= List of songs written by Shane McAnally =

American country music singer-songwriter Shane McAnally has written songs both for himself, on his self-titled debut album, and for others.

In 2008, McAnally co-wrote Lee Ann Womack's single "Last Call". In 2010, he had his first No. 1 on Hot Country Songs as a songwriter with Kenny Chesney's "Somewhere with You". Other songs that McAnally has written that have reached No. 1 on the country charts include "Kiss Tomorrow Goodbye" by Luke Bryan, "Alone with You" by Jake Owen, "Come Over", "American Kids", "Wild Child" by Kenny Chesney, "Better Dig Two" by The Band Perry, "Say You Do" and "Different For Girls" by Dierks Bentley, "John Cougar, John Deere, John 3:16" by Keith Urban, "Stay a Little Longer" by Brothers Osborne, "I Met a Girl" by William Michael Morgan, "Mama's Broken Heart" and "Vice" by Miranda Lambert, "If I Told You" by Darius Rucker, "Young & Crazy" by Frankie Ballard, "T-Shirt", "Unforgettable" and "Marry Me" by Thomas Rhett, "Leave the Night On", "Take Your Time" and "Body Like a Back Road" by Sam Hunt, "Drinkin' Problem" by Midland and "Get Along" by Kenny Chesney. McAnally reached No. 1 with Old Dominion's "Written In The Sand" and "Make It Sweet". McAnally is closely associated with Kacey Musgraves, having co-written several songs on three of her major-label albums, Same Trailer Different Park, Pageant Material, and Golden Hour.

== Songs written by McAnally ==
Year	Artist	Album	Song	Co-writer(s)
2008	Lee Ann Womack	Call Me Crazy	"Last Call"	Erin Enderlin
2009	Luke Bryan	Doin' My Thing	"What Country Is"	Jamie Teachenor
2010	Kenny Chesney	Hemingway's Whiskey	"Somewhere with You"	J.T. Harding
2010	Reba McEntire	All The Women I Am	"All the Women I Am"	Kent Blazy, Marv Green
2010	Reba McEntire	All The Women I Am	"Cry"	Brandy Clark
2010	Reba McEntire	All The Women I Am	"The Day She Got Divorced"	Brandy Clark, Mark D. Sanders
2010	LeAnn Rimes	Lady & Gentlemen	"Crazy Women"	Brandy Clark, Jessie Jo Dillon
2011	Luke Bryan	Tailgates & Tanlines	"Kiss Tomorrow Goodbye"	Luke Bryan, Jeff Stevens
2011	Luke Bryan	Tailgates & Tanlines	"You Don't Know Jack"	Erin Enderlin
2011	Kristin Chenoweth	Some Lessons Learned	"What Would Dolly Do?"	Kristin Chenoweth, Desmond Child, Bob Ezrin
2011	Sarah Darling feat Vince Gill	Angels & Devils	"Bad Habit"	Sarah Darling, Josh Osborne
2011	The Dirt Drifters	This is My Blood	"Hurt Somebody"	Mark Nesler, Matthew Fleener
2011	Miranda Lambert	Four the Record	"Mama's Broken Heart"	Brandy Clark, Kacey Musgraves
2011	David Nail	The Sound of a Million Dreams	"That's How I'll Remember You"	Brandy Clark, Madeleine Slate
2011	Jake Owen	Barefoot Blue Jean Night	"Alone with You"	Catt Gravitt, J.T. Harding
2011	Ashton Shepherd	Where Country Grows	"Tryin' to Go to Church"	Ashton Shepherd, Brandy Clark
2011	Uncle Kracker	My Hometown	"My Hometown"	J.T. Harding, Matthew Shafer
2011	Chris Young	Neon	"Neon"	Josh Osborne, Trevor Rosen
2012	Greg Bates	Greg Bates	"Fill In the Blank"	Greg Bates, Josh Osborne
2012	Greg Bates	Greg Bates	"Go Time"	Greg Bates, Jimmy Ritchey
2012	Kenny Chesney	Welcome to the Fishbowl	"Come Over"	Josh Osborne, Sam Hunt
2012	Easton Corbin	All Over the Road	"Are You with Me"	Tommy Lee James, Terry McBride
2012	Florida Georgia Line	Here's to the Good Times	"Party People"	Luke Laird, J.T. Harding
2012	Love and Theft	Love and Theft	"Runnin' Out of Air"	Josh Osborne, Matt Jenkins
2012	Sam Palladio & Clare Bowen	The Music of Nashville: Season 1 Volume 2	"Fade Into You"	Matt Jenkins, Trevor Rosen
2012	Randy Rogers Band	Trouble	"Fuzzy"	Josh Osborne, Trevor Rosen
2012	Joanna Smith	Be What It Wants to Be	"We Can't Be Friends"	Brandy Clark, Shelley Skidmore
2013	Ashley Monroe	Like a Rose	"Two Weeks Late"	Ashley Monroe
2013	The Band Perry	Pioneer	"Better Dig Two"	Brandy Clark, Trevor Rosen
2013	The Band Perry	Pioneer	"Chainsaw"	Josh Osborne, Matthew Ramsey
2013	Wade Bowen	Songs About Trucks	"Songs About Trucks"	Brandy Clark
2013	Luke Bryan	Crash My Party	"Goodbye Girl"	Josh Osborne, Matthew Ramsey
2013	Brandy Clark	12 Stories	"Stripes"	Brandy Clark, Matt Jenkins
2013	Brandy Clark	12 Stories	"Pray to Jesus"	Brandy Clark, Jessi Jo Dillion
2013	Brandy Clark	12 Stories	"Crazy Women"	Brandy Clark
2013	Brandy Clark	12 Stories	"Take A Little Pill"	Brandy Clark, Mark D. Sanders
2013	Brandy Clark	12 Stories	"The Day She Got Divorced"	Brandy Clark, Mark D. Sanders
2013	Brandy Clark	12 Stories	"Hungover"	Brandy Clark, Jessie Jo Dillion
2013	Brandy Clark	12 Stories	"Just Like Him"	Brandy Clark, Jessie Jo Dillion
2013	Kelly Clarkson	—N/a	"Tie It Up"	Ashley Arrison, Josh Osborne
2013	Kelly Clarkson	Wrapped in Red	"Wrapped in Red"	Kelly Clarkson, Ashley Arrison, Aben Eubanks
2013	Sheryl Crow	Feels Like Home	"Homecoming Queen"	Brandy Clark, Luke Laird
2013	Billy Currington	We Are Tonight	"Closer Tonight"	J.T. Harding, Marv Green
2013	Billy Currington	We Are Tonight	"Another Day Without You"	Barry Dean, Andrew Dorff
2013	Brett Eldredge	Bring You Back	"On & On"	Brett Eldredge, Luke Laird, Barry Dean
2013	Florida Georgia Line	Here's to the Good Times	"Take It Out On Me"	Chris DeStefano, Ashley Gorley
2013	Hunter Hayes	Hunter Hayes (Encore)	"Light Me Up"	Hunter Hayes, busbee
2013	Lady Antebellum	Golden	"Downtown"	Natalie Hemby, Luke Laird
2013	Scotty McCreery	See You Tonight	"Feel Good Summer Song"	J.T. Harding, Josh Osborne
2013	Tim McGraw	Two Lanes of Freedom	"It's Your World"	Josh Osborne, Scott Stepakoff
2013	Lorrie Morgan & Pam Tillis	Dos Divas	"Last Night's Makeup"	Jessie Jo Dillion, Brandy Clark
2013	Kacey Musgraves	Same Trailer Different Park	"Merry Go 'Round"	Kacey Musgraves, Josh Osborne
2013	Kacey Musgraves	Same Trailer Different Park	"Blowin' Smoke"	Kacey Musgraves, Luke Laird
2013	Kacey Musgraves	Same Trailer Different Park	"Follow Your Arrow"	Kacey Musgraves, Brandy Clark
2013	Kacey Musgraves	Same Trailer Different Park	"Silver Lining	Kacey Musgraves, Josh Osborne
2013	Kacey Musgraves	Same Trailer Different Park	"My House"	Kacey Musgraves, Josh Osborne
2013	Kacey Musgraves	Same Trailer Different Park	"Dandelion"	Kacey Musgraves, Brandy Clark
2013	Kacey Musgraves	Same Trailer Different Park	"Keep It to Yourself"	Kacey Musgraves, Luke Laird
2013	Kacey Musgraves	Same Trailer Different Park	"Stupid"	Kacey Musgraves, Josh Osborne
2013	Kacey Musgraves	Same Trailer Different Park	"Step Off	Kacey Musgraves, Luke Laird
2013	Matt Nathanson	Last of the Great Pretenders	"Farewell December"	J.T. Harding, Matt Nathanson
2013	Jake Owen	Days of Gold	"Ghost Town"	Chris DeStefano, Ashley Gorley
2013	Jake Owen	Days of Gold	"One Little Kiss (Never Killed Nobody)"	Ashley Gorley, Jimmy Robbins
2013	Jake Owen	Days of Gold	"Tipsy"	Matt Jenkins, Trevor Rosen
2013	Hayden Panettiere	Nashville Season 2	"Boys & Buses"	Brandy Clark, Josh Osborne
2013	Thomas Rhett	It Goes Like This	"Call Me Up"	Luke Laird, Rhett Akins
2013	Darius Rucker (feat. Sheryl Crow)	True Believers	"Love Without You"	Brandy Clark
2013	Thompson Square	Just Feels Good	"Testing The Water"	Luke Laird, Hillary Lindsey
2013	Keith Urban	Fuse	"Come Back To Me"	Brandy Clark, Trevor Rosen
2013	Gretchen Wilson	Right on Time	"Get Outta My Yard"	Brandy Clark, Kacey Musgraves
2013	Charlie Worsham	Rubberband	"Someone Like Me"	Charlie Worsham, Ryan Tyndell
2013	Charlie Worsham	Rubberband	"Break What's Broken"	Charlie Worsham, Josh Osborne
2013	Chris Young	A.M.	"Hold You To It"	Chris Young, Josh Osborne
2013	Chris Young	A.M.	"Text Me Texas"	Rhett Akins
2014	Frankie Ballard	Sunshine & Whiskey	"Young & Crazy"	Rhett Akins, Ashley Gorley
2014	Dierks Bentley	Riser	"Say You Do"	Matthew Ramsey, Trevor Rosen
2014	Dierks Bentley	Riser	"Hurt Somebody"	Mark Nesler, Matt Fleeney
2014	Lee Brice	I Don't Dance	"Somebody's Been Drinkin'"	Hillary Lindsey, Ashley Gorley
2014	The Never Ending	One	"Call Me Up"	Debby Ryan
2014	Connie Britton	The Music of Nashville: Season 3, Volume 1	"Lies of the Lonely"	Natalie Hemby, Josh Osborne
2014	Brothers Osborne	Pawn Shop	"Stay a Little Longer"	John Osborne, T.J. Osborne
2014	Kenny Chesney	The Big Revival	"American Kids"	Rodney Clawson, Luke Laird
2014	Kenny Chesney	The Big Revival	"Wild Child"	Kenny Chesney, Josh Osborne
2014	Sara Evans	Slow Me Down	"You Never Know"	Sara Evans, Josh Osborne
2014	Pat Green feat. Lyle Lovett	—N/a	"Girls from Texas"	Jon Randall
2014	Sam Hunt	Montevallo	"Break Up in a Small Town"	Sam Hunt, Zach Crowell
2014	Sam Hunt	Montevallo	"Leave the Night On"	Sam Hunt, Josh Osborne
2014	Sam Hunt	Montevallo	"Take Your Time"	Sam Hunt, Josh Osborne
2014	Sam Hunt	Montevallo	"Single for the Summer"	Sam Hunt, Josh Osborne, Zach Crowell
2014	Josh Abbott Band	—N/a	"Hangin' Around"	Josh Abbott, Josh Osborne
2014	Lady Antebellum	747	"Freestyle"	Hillary Scott, Charles Kelley, Dave Haywood
2014	Lady Antebellum	747	"Just a Girl	Hillary Scott, Charles Kelley, Dave Haywood
2014	Lady Antebellum	747	"Damn You Seventeen"	Luke Laird, Rodney Clawson
2014	Miranda Lambert feat. Little Big Town	Platinum	"Smokin' and Drinkin'"	Natalie Hemby, Luke Laird
2014	Little Big Town	Pain Killer	"Quit Breaking Up with Me"	Natalie Hemby, busbee
2014	Little Big Town	Pain Killer	"Things You Don't Think About"	Natalie Hemby, Ross Copperman
2014	Lost Frequencies	—N/a	"Are You With Me" (Remix)	Tommy Lee James, Terry McBride
2014	Tim McGraw	Sundown Heaven Town	"Overrated"	Josh Osborne, Rivers Rutherford
2014	Kacey Musgraves	—N/a	"The Trailer Song"	Kacey Musgraves, Brandy Clark
2014	Kacey Musgraves	The Best of Me (Soundtrack)	"Love Is a Liar"	Kacey Musgraves, Josh Osborne
2014	David Nail	I'm a Fire	"Burnin' Bed"	Brandy Clark, Bob DiPiero
2014	David Nail	I'm a Fire	"Brand New Day"	Scooter Carusoe
2014	Chase Rice	Ignite the Night	"Gonna Wanna Tonight"	Jon Nite, Jimmy Robbins
2014	Eric Paslay	Eric Paslay	"Country Side of Heaven"	Eric Paslay, Dylan Altman
2014	Blake Shelton	Bringing Back the Sunshine	"Messed Up"	T.J. Harding, Luke Laird
2014	Carrie Underwood	—N/a	"Keep Us Safe"	Carrie Underwood, Luke Laird, Hillary Lindsey
2015	Josh Abbott	Amnesia	"Amnesia"	Josh Abbott, Josh Osborne
2015	Lucy Angel	Lucy Angel	"Crazy Too"	Brandy Clark, Karen Rochelle
2015	Lucy Angel	Lucy Angel	"Stripes"	Brandy Clark, Matt Jenkins
2015	Luke Bryan	Kill The Lights	"Scarecrows"	Trevor Rosen, Ashley Gorley
2015	Laura Bell Bundy	Another Piece of Me	"Let's Pretend We're Married"	Laura Bell Bundy, Josh Osborne
2015	Kelly Clarkson	Piece by Piece	"Good Goes the Bye"	Natalie Hemby, Jimmy Robbins
2015	Kelly Clarkson	Piece by Piece	"Second Wind"	Chris DeStefano, Maren Morris
2015	Easton Corbin	About to Get Real	"Are You with Me"	Tommy Lee James, Terry McBride
2015	Pat Green	Home	"Day One"	Josh Osborne, Matthew Ramsey
2015	Lucas Hoge	Dirty South	"Halabamalujah"	Josh Osborne, Sam Hunt
2015	Sam Hunt	Between the Pines	"Break Up in a Small Town"	Sam Hunt, Zach Crowell
2015	Sam Hunt	Between the Pines	"Leave the Night On"	Sam Hunt, Josh Osborne
2015	Sam Hunt	Between the Pines	"Take Your Time"	Sam Hunt, Josh Osborne
2015	Sam Hunt	Between the Pines	"Single for the Summer"	Sam Hunt, Josh Osborne, Zach Crowell
2015	Sam Hunt	Between the Pines	"Come Over"	Sam Hunt, Josh Osborne
2015	Sam Hunt	Between the Pines	"I Met a Girl"	Sam Hunt, Trevor Rosen
2015	Robby Johnson	Don't Look Back	"She Moves"	Josh Osborne, Trevor Rosen
2015	Robby Johnson	Don't Look Back	"Shady"	Luke Laird, Sam Hunt
2015	Toby Keith	35 MPH Town	"Drunk Americans"	Brandy Clark, Bob DiPiero
2015	Reba McEntire	Love Somebody	"She Got Drunk Last Night"	Brandy Clark
2015	Reba McEntire	Love Somebody	"Until They Don't Love You"	Lori McKenna, Josh Osborne
2015	Reba McEntire	Love Somebody	"Love Somebody"	Josh Osborne, Sam Hunt
2015	Reba McEntire	Love Somebody	"More Than Just Her Last Name"	Brandy Clark, Josh Osborne
2015	William Michael Morgan	Single	"I Met a Girl"	Trevor Rosen, Sam Hunt
2015	Maren Morris	Maren Morris	"Company You Keep"	Luke Laird, Maren Morris
2015	Kacey Musgraves	Pageant Material	"High Time"	Kacey Musgraves, Luke Laird
2015	Kacey Musgraves	Pageant Material	"Dime Store Cowgirl"	Kacey Musgraves, Luke Laird
2015	Kacey Musgraves	Pageant Material	"Pageant Material"	Kacey Musgraves, Luke Laird
2015	Kacey Musgraves	Pageant Material	"Biscuits"	Kacey Musgraves, Brandy Clark
2015	Kacey Musgraves	Pageant Material	"Somebody to Love"	Kacey Musgraves, Josh Osborne
2015	Kacey Musgraves	Pageant Material	"Die Fun"	Kacey Musgraves, Luke Laird
2015	Kacey Musgraves	Pageant Material	"Family Is Family"	Kacey Musgraves, Josh Osborne
2015	Kacey Musgraves	Pageant Material	"Cup of Tea"	Kacey Musgraves, Josh Osborne
2015	Kacey Musgraves	Pageant Material	"Fine"	Kacey Musgraves, Ashley Arrison
2015	Old Dominion	Meat and Candy	"'Til It's Over"	Matthew Ramsey, Jimmy Robbins
2015	Old Dominion	Meat and Candy	"We Got It Right"	Matthew Ramsey, Ross Copperman
2015	Jake Owen	Single	"Real Life"	Josh Osborne, Ashley Gorley, Ross Copperman
2015	Thomas Rhett	Tangled Up	"Anthem"	Nicolle Galyon, Jimmy Robbins
2015	Thomas Rhett	Tangled Up	"T-Shirt"	Luke Laird, Ashley Gorley
2015	George Strait	Texas Rising (Soundtrack)	"Take Me to Texas"	Brandy Clark
2016	Dierks Bentley feat. Elle King	Black	"Different for Girls"	J. T. Harding
2016	Brothers Osborne	Pawn Shop	"Stay a Little Longer"	John Osborne, T.J. Osborne
2016	Kenny Chesney	Cosmic Hallelujah	"Noise"	Ross Copperman, Jon Nite
2016	Kenny Chesney	Cosmic Hallelujah	"Rich and Miserable"	Josh Osborne, Jesse Frasure
2016	Brandy Clark	Big Day in a Small Town	"Girl Next Door"	Brandy Clark, Jessie Jo Dillon
2016	Brandy Clark	Big Day in a Small Town	"Homecoming Queen"	Brandy Clark, Luke Laird
2016	Brandy Clark	Big Day in a Small Town	"Broke"	Brandy Clark, Josh Osborne
2016	Brandy Clark	Big Day in a Small Town	"Big Day in a Small Town"	Brandy Clark, Mark D. Sanders
2016	Brandy Clark	Big Day in a Small Town	"Since You've Gone to Heaven"	Brandy Clark
2016	Dan + Shay	Obsessed	"Already Ready"	Jimmy Robbins, Dan Smyers, Shay Mooney
2016	Walker Hayes	8Tracks Vol. 1: Good Shit	"Beer In the Fridge"	Walker Hayes, Scot Sherrod, Matt Jenkins
2016	Walker Hayes	8Tracks Vol. 2: Break The Internet	"Beckett"	Walker Hayes
2016	Walker Hayes	8Tracks Vol. 2: Break The Internet	"Break the Internet"	Walker Hayes, Josh Osborne
2016	Miranda Lambert	The Weight of These Wings	"Highway Vagabond"	Natalie Hemby, Luke Dick
2016	Miranda Lambert	The Weight of These Wings	"Vice"	Miranda Lambert, Josh Osborne
2016	Mark Leach	Homemade	"After Party"	Matt Jenkins, Ashley Gorley
2016	Craig Morgan	A Whole Lot More to Me	"Country Side of Heaven"	Eric Paslay, Dylan Altman
2016	Maren Morris	Hero	"Second Wind"	Maren Morris, Chris DeStefano
2016	Maren Morris	Hero	"Just Another Thing"	Maren Morris, Matt Dragstrem
2016	Kacey Musgraves	A Very Kacey Christmas	"Willie Nice Christmas"	Kacey Musgraves, Josh Osborne
2016	Kacey Musgraves	A Very Kacey Christmas	"Christmas Makes Me Cry"	Kacey Musgraves, Brandy Clark
2016	Jennifer Nettles	Playing with Fire	"Hey Heartbreak"	Sarah Haze, Jimmy Robbins
2016	Jennifer Nettles	Playing with Fire	"Chaser"	Jennifer Nettles, Brandy Clark
2016	Jennifer Nettles	Playing with Fire	"Starting Over"	Jennifer Nettles, Brandy Clark
2016	Jennifer Nettles	Playing with Fire	"My House" (feat. Jennifer Lopez)	Jennifer Nettles, Jennifer Lopez, Julio Reyes Copello, Josh Osborne
2016	Jake Owen	American Love	"After Midnight"	Rodney Clawson, Matt Dragstrem
2016	Jake Owen	American Love	"Where I Am"	Ross Copperman, Hillary Lindsey
2016	Jake Owen	American Love	"Everybody Dies Young"	Ross Copperman, Josh Osborne, Scott Stepakoff
2016	Jake Owen	American Love	"If He Ain't Gonna Love You"	Luke Laird, Chris Stapleton
2016	Dallas Smith	Side Effects	"One Little Kiss"	Ashley Gorley, Jimmy Robbins
2016	Jo Smith	Introducing Jo Smith	"Dance Dirty"	Joanna Smith, Josh Osborne, Jesse Frasure
2016	Jo Smith	Introducing Jo Smith	"Queen of Fools"	Joanna Smith, Josh Osborne, Jesse Frasure
2016	Keith Urban	Ripcord	"John Cougar, John Deere, John 3:16"	Josh Osborne, Ross Copperman
2016	Midland	Midland - EP	"Electric Rodeo"	Josh Osborne, Cameron Duddy, Mark Wystrach, Jess Carson
2016	Midland	Midland - EP	"Drinkin' Problem"	Josh Osborne, Cameron Duddy, Mark Wystrach, Jess Carson
2016	Midland	Midland - EP	"Burn Out"	Josh Osborne, Cameron Duddy, Mark Wystrach, Jess Carson
2016	Darius Rucker	When Was the Last Time	"If I Told You"	Ross Copperman, Jon Nite
2017	Trace Adkins	—N/a	"Watered Down"	Trevor Rosen, Matt Jenkins
2017	Gary Allan	—N/a	"Mess Me Up"	Ross Copperman, Ashley Gorley
2017	Kelsea Ballerini	Unapologetically	"Graveyard"	Kelsea Ballerini, Forest Glen Whitehead
2017	Kelsea Ballerini	Unapologetically	"Get Over Yourself"	Kelsea Ballerini, Ross Copperman
2017	Kelsea Ballerini	Unapologetically	"In Between"	Kelsea Ballerini, Jimmy Robbins
2017	Kelsea Ballerini	Unapologetically	"I Hate Love Songs"	Kelsea Ballerini, Trevor Rosen
2017	Chad Brownlee	—N/a	"Something We Shouldn't Do"	Jimmy Robbins, Matt Jenkins
2017	Brandy Clark	Live from Los Angeles	"Stripes"	Brandy Clark, Matt Jenkins
2017	Brandy Clark	Live from Los Angeles	"Big Day In a Small Town"	Brandy Clark, Mark D. Sanders
2017	Brandy Clark	Live from Los Angeles	"Girl Next Door"	Brandy Clark, Jessie Jo Dillon
2017	Brandy Clark	Live from Los Angeles	"Since You've Gone to Heaven"	Brandy Clark
2017	Brandy Clark	Live from Los Angeles	"Pray to Jesus"	Brandy Clark
2017	Brandy Clark	—N/a	"You're Drunk"	Brandy Clark, Josh Osborne
2017	Logan Mize	Come Back Road	"All Time"	Luke Dick, Josh Osborne
2017	Eli Young Band	Fingerprints	"A Heart Needs A Break"	Josh Osborne, Ross Copperman
2017	Lindsay Ell	The Project	"Just Another Girl"	Lindsay Ell, Josh Osborne
2017	Walker Hayes	boom.	"Beckett"	Walker Hayes
2017	Walker Hayes	boom.	"Beer in the Fridge"	Walker Hayes, Matt Jenkins, Scott Sherrod
2017	Lucas Hoge	Dirty South	"Halabamalujah"	Josh Osborne, Sam Hunt
2017	Sam Hunt	Single	"Drinkin' Too Much"	Sam Hunt, Zach Crowell, Stuart Hines
2017	Sam Hunt	Single	"Body Like a Back Road"	Josh Osborne, Sam Hunt, Zach Crowell
2017	Jana Kramer	—N/a	"I've Done Love"	Josh Osborne, Nicolle Galyon
2017	Lady Antebellum	Heart Break	"Somebody Else's Heart"	busbee, Hillary Scott, Charles Kelley, Dave Haywood
2017	Brandon Lay	—N/a	"Speakers, Bleachers, and Preachers"	Brandon Lay, Luke Laird
2017	Tracy Lawrence	Good Ole Days	"Good Ole Days"	Josh Osborne, Chris DeStefano
2017	Midland	On the Rocks	"Drinkin' Problem"	Cameron Duddy, Mark Wystrach, Jess Carson, Josh Osborne
2017	Midland	On the Rocks	"Burn Out"	Cameron Duddy, Mark Wystrach, Jess Carson, Josh Osborne
2017	Midland	On the Rocks	"Electric Rodeo"	Cameron Duddy, Mark Wystrach, Jess Carson, Josh Osborne
2017	Midland	On the Rocks	"Make a Little	Cameron Duddy, Mark Wystrach, Jess Carson, Josh Osborne
2017	Midland	On the Rocks	"More Than a Fever"	Cameron Duddy, Mark Wystrach, Jess Carson, Josh Osborne
2017	Midland	On the Rocks	"Out of Sight"	Cameron Duddy, Mark Wystrach, Jess Carson, Luke Laird
2017	Midland	On the Rocks	"Nothing New Under Neon"	Cameron Duddy, Mark Wystrach, Jess Carson, Josh Osborne
2017	Jerrod Niemann	This Ride	"Zero to Crazy"	Ashley Gorley, Chris DeStefano
2017	Jerrod Niemann	This Ride	"A Little More Love"	Ross Copperman, Natalie Hemby, Kristi Neumann
2017	Old Dominion	Happy Endings	"Shoe Shopping"	Matthew Ramsey, Luke Laird
2017	Old Dominion	Happy Endings	"Still Writing Songs About You"	Matthew Ramsey, Trevor Rosen, Brad Tursi
2017	Old Dominion	Happy Endings	"Written in the Sand"	Matthew Ramsey, Trevor Rosen, Brad Tursi
2017	Carly Pearce	Every Little Thing	"If My Name Was Whiskey"	Carly Pearce, busbee
2017	Carly Pearce	Every Little Thing	"Feel Somethin'"	Natalie Hemby, Busbee
2017	Jake Owen	Greatest Hits	"Alone With You"	Catt Gravitt, JT Harding
2017	Thomas Rhett	Life Changes	"Unforgettable"	Thomas Rhett, Jesse Frasure, Ashley Gorley
2017	Thomas Rhett	Life Changes	"Marry Me"	Thomas Rhett, Jesse Frasure, Ashley Gorley
2017	Thomas Rhett	Life Changes	"Smooth Like the Summer"	Josh Osborne, Thomas Rhett, Jesse Frasure
2017	Thomas Rhett	Life Changes	"When We're 80 (Bonus Track)"	Josh Osborne, Thomas Rhett, Jesse Frasure
2017	Darius Rucker	When Was the Last Time	"If I Told You"	Ross Copperman, Jon Nite
2017	Darius Rucker	When Was the Last Time	"Twenty Something"	Josh Osborne, Jon Nite, Zach Crowell
2017	Darius Rucker	When Was the Last Time	"Hands On Me"	Ross Copperman, J.T. Harding
2017	Keith Urban	Graffiti U	"Female"	Ross Copperman, Nicolle Galyon
2017	Charlie Worsham	Beginning of Things	"Southern by the Grace of God"	Charlie Worsham, Luke Dick
2017	Wheeler Walker Jr.	Ol'Wheeler	"F****n' Around"	JT Harding, Wheeler Walker Jr.
2018	Brothers Osborne	Port Saint Joe	"I Don't Remember Me (Before You)"	T.J. Osborne, John Osborne, Matt Dragstrem
2018	Kenny Chesney	Songs for the Saints	"Every Heart"	Josh Osborne
2018	Kenny Chesney	Songs for the Saints	"Get Along"	Josh Osborne, Ross Copperman
2018	Eli Young Band	—N/a	"Love Ain't"	Ashley Gorley, Ross Copperman
2018	Sam Hunt	—N/a	"Downtown's Dead"	Sam Hunt, Josh Osborne, Zach Crowell
2018	Kacey Musgraves	Golden Hour	"Rainbow"	Kacey Musgraves, Natalie Hemby
2018	Kacey Musgraves	Golden Hour	"Space Cowboy"	Kacey Musgraves, Luke Laird
2018	Old Dominion	—N/a	"Make It Sweet"	Brad Tursi, Geoff Sprung, Matthew Ramsey, Trevor Rosen, Whit Sellers
2018	Jake Owen	Greetings from... Jake	"Down To The Honkytonk"	Rodney Clawson, Luke Laird
2018	Michael Ray	Amos	"Dancing Forever"	Matt Ramsey, Trevor Rosen, Brad Tursi
2018	Sarah Ross	Nervous Breakdown	"Nervous Breakdown"	Trevor Rosen, Brandy Clark, Kacey Musgraves
2018	Chevel Shepherd	—N/a	"Broken Hearts"	Ashley Arrison, Aben Eubanks
2018	Hilary Williams	My Lucky Scars	"The Day After The Circus"	Josh Osborne, Natalie Hemby
2018	Brett Young	Ticket to L.A.	"Let It Be Mine"	Jon Nite, Ross Copperman
2018	Brett Young	Ticket to L.A.	"Where You Want Me"	Brett Young, Jessie Jo Dillon
2018	Walker Hayes	—N/a	"90's Country"	Walker Hayes, Gabby Mooney
2019
2019	John Legend	—N/a	"We Need Love (from Songland)"	Tebby Burrows, John Legend, Ester Dean, Ryan Tedder, Andrew DeRoberts, Andre Lyon, Imran Avaz, Juan Jose Botero, Marcello Valenzano, Thomas Kessler
2019	Walker Hayes	—N/a	"Don't Let Her"	Josh Osborne, Trevor Rosen
2019	Old Dominion	Old Dominion	"Some People Do"	Matthew Ramsey, Thomas Rhett, Jesse Frasure
2019	Old Dominion	Old Dominion	"Never Be Sorry"	Josh Osborne, Trevor Rosen, Matthew Ramsey, Brad Tursi
2019	Old Dominion	Old Dominion	"My Heart Is A Bar"	Josh Osborne, Matthew Ramsey, Trevor Rosen, Brad Tursi
2019	Old Dominion	Old Dominion	"Dancing Forever"	Matthew Ramsey, Trevor Rosen, Ross Copperman
2019	Old Dominion	—N/a	"Young (From Songland)"	Andrew DeRoberts, Ester Dean, Ryan Tedder, Andrew Tinker, Benjamin Hovey, Nick Seeley, Raphael Judrin, Pierre-Antoine Melki, James Abrahart, Katelyn Tarver Blaise, Brad Tursi, George Sprung Jr., Matthew Ramsey, William Sellers, Trevor Rosen
2019	Teddy Robb	—N/a	"Really Shouldn't Drink Around You"	Josh Osborne, Trevor Rosen
2019	Thomas Rhett	Center Point Road	"Up"	Jesse Frasure, Ashley Gorley, Thomas Rhett
2019	Midland	Let It Roll	"Mr. Lonely"	Josh Osborne, Cameron Duddy, Jess Carson, Mark Wystrach
2019	Midland	Let It Roll	"Put The Hurt On Me"	Josh Osborne, Cameron Duddy, Jess Carson, Mark Wystrach
2019	Midland	Let It Roll	"Playboys"	Josh Osborne, Cameron Duddy, Jess Carson, Mark Wystrach
2019	Midland	Let It Roll	"Cheatin' Songs"	Josh Osborne, Cameron Duddy, Jess Carson, Mark Wystrach
2019	Midland	Let It Roll	"I Love You, Goodbye"	Josh Osborne, Cameron Duddy, Jess Carson, Mark Wystrach
2019	Aloe Blacc	—N/a	"Same Blood (From Songland)"	Aloe Blacc, Steve Fee, Zachary Kale, Ester Dean, Ryan Tedder, Andrew DeRoberts
2019	Aloe Blacc	Fast & Furious Presents: Hobbs & Shaw (Original Motion Picture Soundtrack)	"Gettin' Started" [feat. JID]	Aloe Blacc, Kyle Williams, Joel Rousseau, Justin Amundrud, Ester Dean, Ryan Tedder, Andrew DeRoberts, J.I.D, Zach Skelton
2019	Jack Newsome	—N/a	"Lying (Next To You) (From Songland)"	Jack Newsome, Elsa Curran, Christina Galligan, Ester Dean, Ryan Tedder, Andrew DeRoberts
2019	Kelsea Ballerini	—N/a	"Better Luck Next Time (From Songland)"	Kelsea Ballerini, Darius Coleman, Ester Dean, Ryan Tedder, Andrew DeRoberts, Taylor Sparks
2019	Meghan Trainor	—N/a	"Hurt Me (From Songland)"	Meghan Trainor, Ester Dean, Ryan Tedder, Nicole Haley Cohen, Jack Newsome, Mike Sabath, Zach Skelton
2019	Jonas Brothers	—N/a	"Greenlight (From Songland)"	Nick Jonas, Kevin Jonas, Joe Jonas, Ester Dean, Ryan Tedder, John Brandon Paciolla, Zach Skelton
2019	The Black Eyed Peas	—N/a	"Be Nice (feat. Snoop Dogg)	will.i.am, Adam Friedman, Martjin Konijenburg, Ryan Merchant, Anish Sood, Ryan Tedder, Ester Dean, Snoop Dogg, Keith Harris, Lance Tolbert
2019	Kylie Morgan	—N/a	"Boys Girl"	Ross Copperman, Kylie Morgan
2019	Macklemore	—N/a	"Shadow (feat. IRO) [From Songland]"	Ori Rakib, Ester Dean, Ryan Tedder, Andrew DeRoberts, Ben Haggerty, Aaron Kleinstub, Coyle Girelli
2019	Brandon Ratcliff	—N/a	"Slow Down Hometown"	Pete Good, Brandon Ratcliff, AJ Babcock
2019	Leona Lewis	—N/a	"Solo Quiero (Somebody To Love) [From Songland]"	Leona Lewis! Ester Dean, Ryan Tedder, Rosalyn Athalie Chivonne Lockhart, Matthew Fonson, Alessandro, Calemme, Alejandro Rengifo, Mauricio Rengifo, Andres Torres
2019	Sheryl Crow	Threads	"Lonely Alone (feat. Willie Nelson"	Sheryl Crow
2019	Alex Hall	—N/a	"Half Past You"	Pete Good, Alex Hall, AJ Babcock
2019	Ashley McBryde	—N/a	"One Night Standards"	Ashley McBryde, Nicolette Hayford
2019	Sam DeRosa	—N/a	"Pill For This (From Songland)"	Sam DeRosa, Ester Dean, Ryan Tedder, Ben Samana, Graham Muron
2019	OneRepublic	Single	"Somebody to Love"	Ryan Tedder, Zach Filkins, JT Roach, Jason Evigan, Ester Dean, Andrew DeRoberts, Drew Brown, Brent Kutzle, Eddie Fisher, Andrew Wells, Kevin Robert Fisher, Jintae Ko
2019	Johnny McGuire	Neon Nights	"Tonight All Day"	Tyler Hubbard, Corey Crowder
2019	Sasha Sloan	Self Portrait	"Too Sad To Cry"	King Henry, Sasha Sloan
2019	Erin Enderlin	Chapter Four: The Queen Of Marina Del Ray	"The Queen Of Marina Del Ray"	Erin Enderlin, Felix McTeigue
2019	Brandon Lay	Single	"Still Rock & Roll"	Brandon Lay, J.T. Harding
2019	Old Dominion	Old Dominion: Band Behind The Curtain	"Say You Do"	Trevor Rosen, Matthew Ramsey
2019	Kaleb Lee feat. Kelly Clarkson	Single	"I Dream In Southern"	Josh Osborne, Brandy Clark
2019	Blake Shelton (feat. Gwen Stefani)	Fully Loaded: God's Country	"Nobody But You"	Josh Osborne, Tommy Lee James]], Ross Copperman
2019	Keith Urban	Single	"I'll Be Your Santa Tonight"	Keith Urban
2020
2020	Carly Pearce	Carly Pearce	"Love Has No Heart"	Trevor Rosen, Sara Haze
2020	Carly Pearce	Carly Pearce	"Woman Down"	Laura Veltz, Jimmy Robbins
2020	Brandy Clark	Your Life Is a Record	"Who Broke Whose Heart"	Brandy Clark
2020	Brandy Clark	Your Life Is a Record	"Love Is A Fire"	Brandy Clark, Jessie Jo Dillon
2020	Adam Brand	Speed Of Life	Just A Love Song	Josh Osborne, Preston Brust, Chris Lucas
2020	Caitlyn Smith	Supernova	All Over Again	Caitlyn Smith, Ryan Tedder
2020	Chevel Shepherd	—N/a	"Everybody's Got A Story"	Kacey Musgraves, Brandy Clark
2020	Kelsea Ballerini	kelsea	"The Other Girl" (with Halsey)	Kelsea Ballerini, Ross Copperman
2020	Kelsea Ballerini	kelsea	"Bragger"	Kelsea Ballerini, Ross Copperman, Jimmy Robbins, Nicolle Galyon
2020	Kelsea Ballerini	kelsea	"Half Of My Hometown" (feat. Kenny Chesney	Kelsea Ballerini, Ross Copperman, Jimmy Robbins, Nicolle Galyon
2020	Ashley McBryde	Never Will	"One Night Standards"	Ashley McBryde, Nicolette Hayford
2020	Sam Hunt	Southside	"Hard To Forget"	Sam Hunt, Josh Osborne]], Luke Laird, Ashley Gorley, Russ Hull, Mary Jean Shurtz, Audrey Greisham
2020	Sam Hunt	Southside	"That Ain't Beautiful"	Sam Hunt, Zach Crowell
2020	Sam Hunt	Southside	"Nothing Lasts Forever"	Sam Hunt, Josh Osborne, Zach Crowell
2020	Sam Hunt	Southside	"Body Like A Back Road"	Sam Hunt, Josh Osborne, Zach Crowell
2020	Sam Hunt	Southside	"Downtown's Dead"	Sam Hunt, Josh Osborne, Zach Crowell, Ryan "Charlie Handsome" Vojtesak
2020	Sam Hunt	Southside	"Drinkin' Too Much"	Sam Hunt, Zach Crowell, Stuart Hines
2020	Teddy Robb	Teddy Robb - EP	"Really Shouldn't Drink Around You"	Josh Osborne, Trevor Rosen
2020	Lady Antebellum	Single	"Champagne Night (From Songland)"	Hillary Scott, Charles Kelley, Dave Haywood, Ester Dean, Ryan Tedder, Madeline Merlo, Tina Parol, Patricia Conroy, Andrew DeRoberts, Dave Thomson
2020	H.E.R.	—N/a	"Wrong Places (From Songland)"	Ester Dean, Ryan Tedder, HE.R., Zachary Powell, Raqual Castro, Darhyl Camper Jr.
2020	Kenny Chesney	Here and Now	"Everyone She Knows"	Josh Osborne, Ross Copperman
2020	Martina McBride	—N/a	"Girls Like Me (From Songland)"	Martina McBride, Ester Dean, Ryan Tedder, Michael Tyler, Stephanie Chapman, Halie Wooldridge, Dan Swank, Alexis Kristine Shadle
2020	Julia Michaels	—N/a	"Give It To Me (From Songland)"	Julia Michaels, Ester Dean, Ryan Tedder, Andrew DeRoberts, Joshua Keegan Bost
2020	Todd Tilghman	—N/a	"Long Way Home (From The Voice)"	Ester Dean, Ryan Tedder, Ryan Donald Innes, Dustin Christensen
2020	Drew Baldridge	—N/a	"When I Fall"	Josh Osborne, Matthew Ramsey
2020	Florida Georgia Line	6-Pack - EP	"Second Guessing (From Songland)"	Tyler Hubbard, Brian Kelley, Ester Dean, Ryan Tedder, Andrew DeRoberts, Corey Crowder, Griffen Palmer, Geoff Warburton, Ben Simonetti
2020	Boyz II Men	—N/a	"Love Struck (From Songland)"	Ester Dean, Ryan Tedder, Christopher Lee, James Gutch, Jerry Duplessis, Raymond Duplessis, Michael Wise, Wanya Morris, Nathan Morris, Shawn Stockman
2020	Midland	Guitars, Couches, Etc., Etc. - EP	"Drinkin' Problem - Acoustic"	Josh Osborne, Mark Wystrach, Cameron Duddy, Jess Carson
2020	Midland	Guitars, Couches, Etc., Etc. - EP	"Cheatin' Songs - Acoustic"	Josh Osborne, Mark Wystrach, Cameron Duddy, Jess Carson
2020	Midland	Guitars, Couches, Etc., Etc. - EP	"Burn Out - Acoustic"	Josh Osborne, Mark Wystrach, Cameron Duddy, Jess Carson
2020	Grayson Michael	—N/a	"When It Rains"	Josh Osborne, Trevor Rosen, LeAnn Phelan
2020	Ben Platt	—N/a	"Everything I Did to Get to You (From Songland)"	Ester Dean, Ryan Tedder, David Davis, Robert Cutarella, Carla Carter, Keith Cullen, Charlie Bryce Wallace, Devin Kennedy
2020	Usher feat. Tyga	—N/a	"California (From Songland)"	Usher, Ester Dean, Ryan Tedder, Tyga, Michael Wise, Kaj Nelson Blokhuis, Melvin Hough II, Rivelino Raoul Wouter, Ryan Cambetes
2020	Brandon Lay	—N/a	"Crazy Like You"	Josh Osborne, Brandon Lay
2020	Ingrid Andress	—N/a	"Waste Of Lime"	Ingrid Andress, Derrick Southerland, Sam Ellis
2020	Morgan Wallen	—N/a	"7 Summers"	Morgan Wallen, Josh Osborne
2020	Tim McGraw	Here On Earth	"Hard To Stay Mad At"	Luke Laird, Lori McKenna
2020	Carly Pearce	Single	"Next Girl"	Carly Pearce, Josh Osborne
2020	Rita Wilson	—N/a	"What I Would Say"	Rita Wilson, Jesse Frasure
2020	Jeremy McComb	—N/a	"Cotton's Gettin' High"	Josh Osborne, Luke Laird
2020	LANY	mama's boy	"i still talk to jesus"	Sasha Sloan, Paul Klein
2020	LANY	mama's boy	"when you're drunk"	Sasha Sloan, Paul Klein, Leslie Priest, Jake Goss
2020	Sasha Sloan	Only Child	"Only Child"	Sasha Sloan, King Henry
2020	Sasha Sloan	Only Child	"High School Me"	Sasha Sloan
2020	Chevel Shepherd		“Just Like the Circus”	Ashley Arrison, Kacey Musgraves
2021
2021	Luke Bryan	—N/a	"Country Does"	Josh Osborne, Ross Copperman
2021	Kenny Chesney	Here And Now (Deluxe Album)	"My Anthem"	Josh Osborne, Jason Gantt
2021	Ross Copperman	—N/a	"Holdin' You"	Ross Copperman, Ashley Gorley
2021	Ross Copperman	—N/a	"Somewhere There's A Light On"	Josh Osborne, Ross Copperman
2021	Walker Hayes	Single	"AA"	Walker Hayes, Luke Laird
2021	Walker Hayes	—N/a	"I Hope You Miss Me"	Walker Hayes, Nick Ruth, Sam Sumser, Sean Small
2021	Miranda Lambert	—N/a	"Y'all Means All"	Miranda Lambert, Luke Dick
2021	LANCO	—N/a	"Near Mrs."	Jeremy Spillman, Brandon Lancaster
2021	Kylie Morgan	—N/a	"Shoulda"	Kylie Morgan, Ben Johnson
2021	Carly Pearce	29	"Next Girl"	Carly Pearce, Josh Osborne
2021	Carly Pearce	29	"29"	Carly Pearce, Josh Osborne
2021	Carly Pearce	29	"Liability"	Carly Pearce, Josh Osborne
2021	Carly Pearce	29	"Day One"	Carly Pearce, Josh Osborne Matthew Ramsey
2021	Stephanie Quayle	—N/a	"Wild Frontier"	Maren Morris, Ross Copperman
2021	Sasha Sloan feat. Sam Hunt	—N/a	"When Was It Over?"	Sasha Sloan, Sam Hunt, King Henry, Emi Dragoi
2021	Blake Shelton	Body Language	"Makin' It Up As You Go"	Josh Osborne, Brad Tursi
2021	Blake Shelton	Body Language	"The Flow"	Josh Osborne, Ross Copperman
2021	Old Dominion	Single	"I Was On A Boat That Day"	Josh Osborne, Matthew Ramsey, Trevor Rosen, Brad Tursi, William Sellers, George Sprung Jr.
2021	Walker Hayes	Country Stuff EP	"I Hope You Miss Me"	Walker Hayes, Nick Ruth, Sam Sumser, Sean Small
2021	Gary Allan	Ruthless	"SEX	Matt Jenkins, Nicolle Galyon
2021	Kylie Morgan	Love, Kylie EP	"Shoulda"	Kylie Morgan, Ben Johnson
2021	Tigirlily	Tigirlily EP	"Dig Yourself"	Josh Osborne, Kendra Slaubaugh, Krista Slaubaugh, Trevor Rosen
2021	Midland	The Last Resort EP	"And Then Some"	Josh Osborne, Mark Wystrach, Cameron Duddy, Jess Carson
2021	Midland	The Last Resort EP	"Two To Two Step"	Josh Osborne, Mark Wystrach, Cameron Duddy, Jess Carson
2021	Midland	The Last Resort EP	"Take Her Off Your Hands"	Josh Osborne, Mark Wystrach, Cameron Duddy, Jess Carson
2021	Carly Pearce	—N/a	"Dear Miss Loretta"	Carly Pearce, Brandy Clark
2021	iRO	Change Your Mind EP	"The Jealousy"	Jack Newsome, Ori Rakib, Amy Wadge
2021	Ben Platt	Reverie	"King Of The World, Pt. 1"	Ben Platt, Michael Pollack, Bram Inscore
2021	Ben Platt	Reverie	"King Of The World, Pt. 2"	Ben Platt, Michael Pollack, Bram Inscore
2021	Ben Platt	Reverie	"King Of The World, Pt. 3"	Ben Platt, Michael Pollack, Ben Platt, Bram Inscore
2021	Old Dominion	—N/a	"All I Know About Girls"	Josh Osborne, Matthew Ramsey, Trevor Rosen, Brad Tursi, George Sprung, Jr., William Sellers
2021	Jon Randall, Jack Ingram	Jon Randall	"Girls From Texas"	Jon Randall
2021	Carly Pearce, Ashley McBryde	Single	"Never Wanted To Be That Girl"	Carly Pearce, Ashley McBryde
2021	Sam Hunt	Single	"23"	Sam Hunt, Josh Osborne, Chris LaCorte
2021	Old Dominion	—N/a	"Hawaii"	Josh Osborne, Matthew Ramsey, Trevor Rosen, Brad Tursi, George Sprung, Jr., William Sellers
2021	Carly Pearce	29: Written In Stone	"Diamondback"	Carly Pearce, Kelsea Ballerini, Tofer Brown
2021	Carly Pearce	29: Written In Stone	"Dear Miss Loretta"	Carly Pearce, Brandy Clark
2021	Carly Pearce	29: Written In Stone	"Next Girl"	Carly Pearce, Josh Osborne
2021	Carly Pearce	29: Written In Stone	"29"	Carly Pearce, Josh Osborne
2021	Carly Pearce	29: Written In Stone	"Never Wanted To Be That Girl"	Carly Pearce, Ashley McBryde
2021	Carly Pearce	29: Written In Stone	"Liability"	Carly Pearce, Josh Osborne,
2021	Carly Pearce	29: Written In Stone	"Day One"	Carly Pearce, Josh Osborne, Matthew Ramsey
2021	Old Dominion	Time, Tequila & Therapy	"Why Are You Still Here"	Matthew Ramsey]], Trevor Rosen, Brad Tursi, George Sprung, Jr., William Sellers
2021	Old Dominion	Time, Tequila & Therapy	"Hawaii"	Josh Osborne, Matthew Ramsey, Trevor Rosen, Brad Tursi, George Sprung, Jr., William Sellers
2021	Old Dominion	Time, Tequila & Therapy	"Walk On Whiskey"	Josh Osborne, Matthew Ramsey, Trevor Rosen, Brad Tursi, George Sprung, Jr., William Sellers
2021	Old Dominion	Time, Tequila & Therapy	"All I Know About Girls"	Josh Osborne, Matthew Ramsey, Trevor Rosen, Brad Tursi, George Sprung, Jr., William Sellers
2021	Old Dominion	Time, Tequila & Therapy	"Blue Jeans"	Matthew Ramsey, Trevor Rosen, Brad Tursi, George Sprung, Jr., William Sellers
2021	Old Dominion	Time, Tequila & Therapy	"No Hard Feelings"	Matthew Ramsey, Trevor Rosen, Brad Tursi, George Sprung, Jr., William Sellers
2021	Old Dominion	Time, Tequila & Therapy	"Lonely Side Of Town"	Josh Osborne, Matthew Ramsey, Trevor Rosen, Brad Tursi, George Sprung, Jr., William Sellers
2021	Old Dominion	Time, Tequila & Therapy	"I Was On A Boat That Day"	Josh Osborne, Matthew Ramsey, Trevor Rosen, Brad Tursi, George Sprung, Jr., William Sellers
2021	Old Dominion	Time, Tequila & Therapy	"Drinking My Feelings"	Josh Osborne, Matthew Ramsey, Trevor Rosen, Brad Tursi, George Sprung, Jr., William Sellers
2021	Old Dominion	Time, Tequila & Therapy	"Something's The Same About You"	Josh Osborne, Matthew Ramsey, Trevor Rosen, Brad Tursi, George Sprung, Jr., William Sellers
2021	Old Dominion	Time, Tequila & Therapy	"I Wanna Live In A House With You Forever"	Matt Jenkins, Matthew Ramsey, Trevor Rosen, Brad Tursi, George Sprung, Jr., William Sellers
2021	Old Dominion	Time, Tequila & Therapy	"Don't Forget Me"	Matt Jenkins, Matthew Ramsey, Trevor Rosen, Brad Tursi, George Sprung, Jr., William Sellers
2021	Old Dominion	Time, Tequila & Therapy	"Ain't Nothing Wrong With Love"	Josh Osborne, Matthew Ramsey, Trevor Rosen, Brad Tursi, George Sprung, Jr., William Sellers
2021	Ryan Hurd	Pelago	"Hell Is An Island"	Ryan Hurd, Aaron Eshuis, Matt McGinn
2021	Dillon Carmichael	Son Of A	"Man Made A Bar"	Luke Laird, Jon Pardi
2021	Caroline Kole	Queen (Deluxe)	"Fool's Gold"	Caroline Kole, Ester Dean, Ryan Tedder, Joshua Cumbee
2021	Renee Blair	Seventeen	"Better Off"	Walker Hayes, Matt McGinn, Jordan Schmidt, Renee Blair
2021	Renee Blair	Seventeen	"Me Tonight"	Matt McGinn, Jordan Schmidt, Renee Blair
2021	Josh Abbott Band	Christmas Was EP	"Christmas Was"	Josh Osborne, Trevor Rosen
2021	Josh Abbott Band	Christmas Was EP	"Santa Better Knock"	Josh Osborne, Scott Stepakoff
2022	Ingrid Andress	Good Person	"Blue"	Ingrid Andress, Derrick Southerland, Sam Ellis
2022	Ingrid Andress	Good Person	"Yearbook"	Ingrid Andress, Pete Good, Derrick Southerland
2022	Kelsea Ballerini	Subject To Change	"I Can't Help Myself"	Kelsea Ballerini, Julian Bunetta, Josh Osborne
2022	Kelsea Ballerini	Subject To Change	"If You Got Down (I'm Goin' Down Too)"	Kelsea Ballerini, Julian Bunetta
2022	Kelsea Ballerini	Subject To Change	"Muscle Memory"	Kelsea Ballerini, Julian Bunetta
2022	Kelsea Ballerini	Subject To Change	"I Guess They Call It Fallin'"	Kelsea Ballerini, Julian Bunetta, Alyssa Vanderheym, Miranda Glory, Jordan Shellhart
2022	Kelsea Ballerini	Subject To Change	"Walk in the Park"	Kelsea Ballerini, Julian Bunetta
2022	Kelsea Ballerini, Kelly Clarkson, Carly Pearce	Subject To Change	"You're Drunk, Go Home"	Kelsea Ballerini, Julian Bunetta, Jimmy Robbins
2022	Danielle Bradbery	—N/a	"A Special place"	Jimmy Robbins, Maren Morris, Sasha Sloan
2022	Ross Copperman	—N/a	"Human"	Ashley Gorley, Ross Copperman
2022	Nicolle Galyon	tendencies.	"winner."	Josh Osborne, Nicolle Galyon
2022	Nicolle Galyon	tendencies.	"tendencies."	Josh Osborne, Nicolle Galyon, Cooper Galyon
2022	Walker Hayes	Country Stuff: The Album	"AA"	Walker Hayes, Luke Laird
2022	Walker Hayes	Country Stuff: The Album	"I Hope You Miss Me"	Walker Hayes, Nick Ruth, Sam Sumser, Sean Small
2022	Tim Hicks	Talk to Time	"Talk To Time"	Josh Osborne, Ross Copperman
2022	Sam Hunt	—N/a	"Water Under The Bridge"	Josh Osborne, Sam Hunt, Chris LaCorte
2022	Jillian Jacqueline	—N/a	"Magic"	Jillian Jacqueline, Tofer Brown
2022	Little Big Town	Mr. Sun	"Whiskey Colored Eyes"	Karen Fairchild, Jimi Westbrook, Phillip Sweet, Kimberly Schlapman, Josh Osborne
2022	Ashley McBryde, Carly Pearce	—N/a	"Never Wanted To Be That Girl - Acoustic"	Ashley McBryde, Carly Pearce
2022	Midland	The Last Resort: Greetings From	"The Last Resort"	Josh Osborne, Cameron Duddy, Mark Wystrach, Jess Carson
2022	Midland	The Last Resort: Greetings From	"If I Lived Here"	Josh Osborne, Cameron Duddy, Mark Wystrach, Jess Carson
2022	Midland	The Last Resort: Greetings From	"Two To Two Step"	Josh Osborne, Cameron Duddy, Mark Wystrach, Jess Carson
2022	Midland	The Last Resort: Greetings From	"Take Her Off Your Hands"	Josh Osborne, Cameron Duddy, Mark Wystrach, Jess Carson]]
2022	Midland	The Last Resort: Greetings From	"And Then Some"	Josh Osborne, Cameron Duddy, Mark Wystrach, Jess Carson
2022	Midland	The Last Resort: Greetings From	"Bury Me In Blue Jeans"	Josh Osborne, Thomas Rhett, Cameron Duddy, Mark Wystrach, Jess Carson
2022	Aaron Raitiere	Single Wide Dream	"Time Will Fly"	Aaron Raitiere, Natalie Hemby
2022	Thomas Rhett	Where We Started	"Anything Cold"	Thomas Rhett, Ashley Gorley, Jesse Frasure
2022	Caitlyn Smith	—N/a	"Dreamin's Free"	Caitlyn Smith, Lori McKenna
2022	Alana Springsteen	—N/a	"New Number"	Ashley Gorley, Rhett Akins
2023	Danielle Bradbery	Single	"A Special Place - Acoustic"	Maren Morris, Sasha Sloan, Jimmy Robbins
2023	Brandy Clark	Brandy Clark	"Come Back to Me"	Brandy Clark, Trevor Rosen
2023	Niall Horan	The Show	"Never Grow Up"	Niall Horan, John Ryan, Julian Bunetta
2023	Sam Hunt	Single	"Start Nowhere"	Sam Hunt, Josh Osborne, Zach Crowell
2023	Sam Hunt	Single	"Walmart"	Sam Hunt, Josh Osborne, Zach Crowell
2023	Elle King (feat. Dierks Bentley)	Come Get Your Wife	"Worth a Shot"	Josh Osborne, Ross Copperman
2023	Luke Laird, Lori McKenna, Barry Dean	The Songwriter Tapes, Vol. 1	"American Kids"	Luke Laird, Rodney Clawson
2023	Carly Pearce	29: Written In Stone (Live From Music City)	"Diamondback"	Carly Pearce, Kelsea Ballerini, Tofer Brown
2023	Carly Pearce	29: Written In Stone (Live From Music City)	"Dear Miss Loretta"	Carly Pearce, Brandy Clark
2023	Carly Pearce	29: Written In Stone (Live From Music City)	"Next Girl"	Carly Pearce, Josh Osborne
2023	Carly Pearce	29: Written In Stone (Live From Music City)	"29"	Carly Pearce, Josh Osborne
2023	Carly Pearce	29: Written In Stone (Live From Music City)	"Never Wanted To Be That Girl"	Carly Pearce, Ashley McBryde
2023	Carly Pearce	29: Written In Stone (Live From Music City)	"Liability"	Carly Pearce, Josh Osborne
2023	Carly Pearce	29: Written In Stone (Live From Music City)	"Day One"	Carly Pearce, Josh Osborne, Matthew Ramsey
2023	Old Dominion	Memory Lane	"Ain't Got A Worry"	Josh Osborne, Matthew Ramsey, Trevor Rosen, Brad Tursi
2023	Old Dominion	Memory Lane	I Should Have Married You	Brad Tursi, Geoff Sprung, Matthew Ramsey, Trevor Rosen, Whit Sellers
2023	Old Dominion	Memory Lane	Some Horses	Shane McAnally, Matt Jenkins
2023	Brandon Ratcliff	Tale of Two Towns	"Drove Me Country"	Brandon Ratcliff, Pete Good, AJ Babcock
2023	Alana Springsteen	Twenty Something	"Look I Like"	Alana Springsteen, Pete Good
2023	Original Broadway Cast of Shucked	Shucked (Original Broadway Cast Recording)	"Overture"	Brandy Clark
2023	Original Broadway Cast of Shucked	Shucked (Original Broadway Cast Recording)	"Corn"	Brandy Clark
2023	Original Broadway Cast of Shucked	Shucked (Original Broadway Cast Recording)	"Walls"	Brandy Clark
2023	Original Broadway Cast of Shucked	Shucked (Original Broadway Cast Recording)	"Walls (Reprise)"	Brandy Clark
2023	Original Broadway Cast of Shucked	Shucked (Original Broadway Cast Recording)	"Travelin' Song"	Brandy Clark
2023	Original Broadway Cast of Shucked	Shucked (Original Broadway Cast Recording)	"Bad"	Brandy Clark
2023	Original Broadway Cast of Shucked	Shucked (Original Broadway Cast Recording)	"Woman of the World"	Brandy Clark
2023	Original Broadway Cast of Shucked	Shucked (Original Broadway Cast Recording)	"Somebody Will"	Brandy Clark
2023	Original Broadway Cast of Shucked	Shucked (Original Broadway Cast Recording)	"Independently Owned"	Brandy Clark
2023	Original Broadway Cast of Shucked	Shucked (Original Broadway Cast Recording)	"Holy Shit"	Brandy Clark
2023	Original Broadway Cast of Shucked	Shucked (Original Broadway Cast Recording)	"Maybe Love"	Brandy Clark
2023	Original Broadway Cast of Shucked	Shucked (Original Broadway Cast Recording)	"Corn (Reprise)"	Brandy Clark
2023	Original Broadway Cast of Shucked	Shucked (Original Broadway Cast Recording)	"Entr'acte"	Brandy Clark
2023	Original Broadway Cast of Shucked	Shucked (Original Broadway Cast Recording)	"We Love Jesus"	Brandy Clark
2023	Original Broadway Cast of Shucked	Shucked (Original Broadway Cast Recording)	"OK"	Brandy Clark
2023	Original Broadway Cast of Shucked	Shucked (Original Broadway Cast Recording)	"I Do"	Brandy Clark
2023	Original Broadway Cast of Shucked	Shucked (Original Broadway Cast Recording)	"Friends"	Brandy Clark
2023	Original Broadway Cast of Shucked	Shucked (Original Broadway Cast Recording)	"Best Man Wins"	Brandy Clark
2023	Original Broadway Cast of Shucked	Shucked (Original Broadway Cast Recording)	"Corn Mix"	Brandy Clark
2023	Original Broadway Cast of Shucked	Shucked (Original Broadway Cast Recording)	"Maybe Love (Remix)"	Brandy Clark
2023	Original Broadway Cast of Shucked	Shucked (Original Broadway Cast Recording)	"Friends"	Brandy Clark
2023	Original Broadway Cast of Shucked	Shucked (Original Broadway Cast Recording)	"Maybe Love"	Brandy Clark
2024	Gabby Barrett	Chapter & Verse	"Jesus on a Train"	Gabby Barrett, Josh Osborne, Ross Copperman
2024	Kenny Chesney	Born	"Guilty Pleasure"	Kenny Chesney, Ross Copperman, Josh Osborne
2024	Kenny Chesney	Born	"Come Here, Go Away"	Kenny Chesney, Josh Osborne, Greylan James
2024	Walker Hayes	Sober Thoughts (EP)	"Beer in the Fridge"	Walker Hayes, Matt Jenkins, Scot Sherrod
2024	Walker Hayes	Sober Thoughts (EP)	"AA"	Walker Hayes, Luke Laird
2024	Miranda Lambert	Postcards from Texas	"Looking Back at Luckenbach"	Miranda Lambert, Natalie Hemby
2024	Miranda Lambert	Postcards from Texas	"Alimony"	Miranda Lambert, Natalie Hemby
2024	Megan Moroney	Am I Okay?	"Hope You're Happy"	Luke Laird
2024	Kacey Musgraves	Deeper Well	"The Architect"	Kacey Musgrave, Josh Osborne
2024	Carly Pearce (feat. Chris Stapleton)	Hummingbird	"We Don't Fight Anymore"	Carly Pearce, Pete Good
2024	Carly Pearce	Hummingbird	"Country Music Made Me Do It"	Carly Pearce, Josh Osborne
2024	Carly Pearce	Hummingbird	"Heels Over Head"	Carly Pearce, Josh Osborne
2024	Carly Pearce	Hummingbird	"Pretty Please"	Carly Pearce, Josh Osborne
2024	Carly Pearce	Hummingbird	"Rock Paper Scissors"	Carly Pearce, Nicolle Gaylon, Jordan Reynolds
2024	Carly Pearce	Hummingbird	"Fault Line"	Carly Pearce, Nicolle Gaylon, Jordan Reynolds
2024	Carly Pearce	Hummingbird	"Hummingbird"	Carly Pearce, Nicolle Gaylon, Jordan Reynolds
2024	Keith Urban	High	"Messed Up as Me"	Rodney Clawson, Jessie Jo Dillon, Michael Lotten
2024	Keith Urban	High	"Love Is Hard"	Eren Cannata, Justin Tranter
2025	Fletcher	Would You Still Love Me If You Really Knew Me?	"Party"	Cari Fletcher, Jennifer Decilveo
2025	Fletcher	Would You Still Love Me If You Really Knew Me?	"The Arsonist"	Cari Fletcher, Jennifer Decilveo
2025	Fletcher	Would You Still Love Me If You Really Knew Me?	"Boy"	Cari Fletcher, Jennifer Decilveo
2025	Old Dominion	Barbara	"Man or the Song"	Matthew Ramsey, Trevor Rosen, Brad Tursi, Ross Copperman
2025	Old Dominion	Barbara	"Late Great Heartbreak"	Matthew Ramsey, Trevor Rosen, Josh Osborne
2025	Old Dominion	Barbara	"One of Us"	Matthew Ramsey, Trevor Rosen, Brad Tursi, Josh Osborne
2025	Blake Shelton	For Recreational Use Only	"Don't Mississippi"	Ross Copperman, Josh Osborne, Ben Hayslip
2025	Hailey Whitters (feat. The Wilder Blue)	Corn Queen	"DanceMor"	Hailey Whitters, Nicolle Galyon, Josh Osborne
2026	Kacey Musgraves	Middle of Nowhere	"Dry Spell"	Kacey Musgrave, Josh Osborne, Luke Laird
2026	Kacey Musgraves	Middle of Nowhere	"I Believe in Ghosts"	Kacey Musgraves, Luke Laird
2026	Kacey Musgraves	Middle of Nowhere	"Abilene"	Kacey Musgraves, Luke Laird
2026	Kacey Musgraves	Middle of Nowhere	"Loneliest Girl"	Kacey Musgraves, Josh Osborne, Luke Laird
2026	Kacey Musgraves	Middle of Nowhere	"Hell on Me"	Kacey Musgraves, Luke Laird, Steph Jones
2026	Kacey Musgraves (feat. Miranda Lambert)	Middle of Nowhere	"Horses and Divorces"	Kacey Musgraves, Miranda Lambert
