= Dream Country =

Studio album by Sarah Darling
- Released: February 2017
- Recorded: Fall 2015
- Studio: Ocean Way, Nashville
- Genre: Country, country pop
- Length: 38:42
- Label: Be Darling Records
- Producer: Larissa Maestro

Sarah Darling chronology
Angels & Devils (2011)	Dream Country (2017)	Wonderland (2019)

Singles from Dream Country
- 1. "Halley's Comet" Released: January 2017; 2. "Where Cowboys Ride" Released: March 2017

Professional ratings
Review scores
Source	Rating
Frankly My Dear	4/5 stars

Dream Country is the third full-length studio album by singer-songwriter Sarah Darling. It was first released digitally on February 10, 2017 by Be Darling Records, with a physical CD and LP concurrently release.

The album includes the singles "Halley’s Comet" and "Where Cowboys Ride" as well as the Sarah Darling's cover of The Smiths song, "Please, Please, Please, Let Me Get What I Want". Three music videos were also made to promote the release. A deluxe edition of the album was digitally released on the iTunes Store.

== Track listing ==
No.	Title	Writer(s)	Length
1.	"Wandering Star"	Sarah Darling, Zach Runquist, Andrew Petroff	3:20
2.	"Where Cowboys Ride"	Sarah Darling, Zach Runquist	4:06
3.	"Anchor"	Sarah Darling, Sam Palladio	3:45
4.	"Tell That Devil"	Jill Andrews, Emery Dobyns, Matthew Mayfield	2:57
5.	"Please, Please, Please Let Me Get What I Want"	Morrissey, Johnny Marr	2:48
6.	"Starry Eyes"	Sarah Darling, Marianne Eileen Murphy, Jessica Lee Campbell	3:26
7.	"Montmartre"	Sarah Darling, Jenn Bostic	3:23
8.	"Halley's Comet"	Sarah Darling, Rebekah Powell, Cheyenne Medders	3:20
9.	"You Take Me All The Way"	Sarah Darling, Tyler Flowers, Cheyenne Medders	3:50
10.	"Stargazer"	Jesse Terry	4:36

Deluxe Edition bonus track
No.	Title	Writer(s)	Length
11.	"Halley's Comet (Radio Mix)"	Sarah Darling, Rebekah Powell, Cheyenne Medders	3:11

== Personnel ==
- Charlie Worsham – additional vocals
- Sam Palladio – additional vocals
- Jessica Lee Campbell – additional vocals
- Larissa Maestro – additional vocals
- Dan Sommers – additional vocals
- Larissa Maestro – string arrangement
- Kristin Weber – fiddle
- Zach Runquist – fiddle
- Eleonore Denig– fiddle
- Larissa Maestro – cello
- Cheyenne Medders – electric guitar
- Cheyenne Medders – acoustic guitar
- Larissa Maestro – acoustic guitar
- John Estes – double bass
- Micah Hulscher – keyboard instruments
- Mikie Martel – trumpet
- Dan Sommers – trombone
- Evan Hutchings – percussion instrument
- Dan Sommers – percussion instrument
