= 35 MPH Town (song) =

Single by Toby Keith

from the album 35 MPH Town
- Released: April 13, 2015
- Genre: Country
- Length: 3:40
- Label: Show Dog-Universal Music
- Songwriters: Toby Keith; Bobby Pinson
- Producers: Toby Keith; Bobby Pinson

Toby Keith singles chronology
"Drunk Americans" (2014)	"35 MPH Town" (2015)	"Beautiful Stranger" (2015)

"35 MPH Town" is a song that Toby Keith wrote with longtime collaborator Bobby Pinson and that Keith released as his 61st single. It was released on April 13, 2015, and is the second single from his album of the same title.

== Content ==
The song is about contemporary American small town life. The narrator claims "things ain't like they used to be round here", and brings to attention that children are becoming lazy instead of working and also the dangers of today, claiming "momma locked the door last night for the first time in all of her years" and "the streets ain't safe for a bike to ride down."

== Release ==
In the single's first week, it sold 5,000 units and was the seventh-most added song to country radio.

== Reception ==
Taste of Country reviewed the song favorably and called it "a story that will stir up opinions".

== Chart performance ==
The song debuted at No. 59 on Country Airplay.

Chart (2015)	Peak position
US Country Airplay (Billboard)	42
