= Every Monday Morning =

Studio album by Sarah Darling
- Released: June 16, 2009
- Recorded: Summer 2008
- Genre: Country; country pop
- Length: 45:54
- Label: Black River
- Producer: Jimmy Nichols

Sarah Darling chronology
Every Monday Morning (2009)	Angels & Devils (2011)

Singles from Every Monday Morning
- 1. "Jack of Hearts" Released: April 2009; 2. "Whenever It Rains" Released: July 2009

Professional ratings
Review scores
Source	Rating
Country Weekly	3.5/5 stars

Every Monday Morning is the debut studio album by American country music artist Sarah Darling. It was first released digitally on June 18, 2009 by Black River Entertainment, with a physical CD release following on July 28, 2009.

The album includes the singles "Jack of Hearts" and "Whenever It Rains" as well as the song that initially brought her to the attention of the record's producer Jimmy Nichols, "Stop the Bleeding". Five music videos were also made to promote the release. A deluxe edition of the album was later digitally released on the iTunes Store and included two of these videos in addition to the radio version of "Whenever It Rains" and a previously unreleased song entitled "Everything Girl".

== Track listing ==
No.	Title	Writer(s)	Length
1.	"Whenever It Rains"	Sarah Darling, Jeff Dayton	3:44
2.	"I Never Do What I Should"	Nathan Chapman, Darling, Liz Rose	3:06
3.	"Can't Call Love"	Darling, David Pack	3:40
4.	"Stop the Bleeding"	Shaunna Bolton, Darling, Joe Perreault	3:24
5.	"Don't Love Me"	Brad Crisler, Darling, Marty Dodson	3:35
6.	"Blue Guitar"	Darling, Kim Tribble	3:11
7.	"Wrapped in Moonlight"	Darling, Dayton, David Malloy	3:50
8.	"Jack of Hearts"	Marc Beeson, Darling, Don Pfrimmer	3:41
9.	"All You've Got"	Darling, Dayton	3:28
10.	"Till the Truth Walks In"	Darling, Dayton	3:26
11.	"Knowing What I Know About Heaven"	Bill Austin, Darling, Dave Robbins	3:43
12.	"It Don't Matter Now (Missing You)"	Darling, Rick Ferrell	3:44
13.	"I'll Wait for You"	Darling, Dayton	3:15

iTunes Deluxe Edition bonus tracks
No.	Title	Writer(s)	Length
14.	"Whenever It Rains" (Radio version)	Darling, Dayton	3:49
15.	"Everything Girl"	Darling, Dayton	2:57
16.	"Whenever It Rains" (Music video)		3:45
17.	"Can't Call Love" (Music video)		3:37

== Personnel ==
- Shaunna Bolton – background vocals
- Spady Brannan – bass guitar
- Pat Buchanan – electric guitar
- Tom Bukovac – electric guitar
- Eric Darken – percussion
- Sarah Darling – lead vocals
- Jeff Dayton – acoustic guitar, electric guitar
- Rick Ferrell – background vocals
- Shawn Fichter – drums
- Larry Franklin – fiddle
- Paul Franklin – steel guitar
- Tommy Harden – drums
- David Hungate – bass guitar
- Tammy Rogers King – fiddle
- B. James Lowry – acoustic guitar
- Jerry McPherson – electric guitar
- Jimmy Nichols – Hammer dulcimer, Fender Rhodes, Hammond B-3 organ, keyboards, piano, synthesizer, Wurlitzer, background vocals
- Billy Panda – acoustic guitar
- Michael Spriggs – acoustic guitar
- Biff Watson – acoustic guitar
