= Ashley Arrison =

American singer and songwriter

- Born: Ashley Arrison; Tennessee, United States
- Genres: Pop, country
- Occupations: Singer, songwriter
- Instruments: Vocals, guitar
- Years active: 2010–present

Ashley Anne Arrison is an American singer-songwriter who has worked with Kelly Clarkson, Kacey Musgraves and other artists.

== Biography ==
Arrison grew up in Tennessee and later moved to Los Angeles, California.

Arrison has released one EP and one album as a solo singer-songwriter, sung backing vocals for Lindsay Lohan and Badly Drawn Boy, and has written songs for Kelly Clarkson and Kacey Musgraves, whom Arrison introduced to mutual friend, Nashville songwriter and subsequent longtime collaborator Shane McAnally. She has also performed with Amy Lee of Evanescence and, as a child, Justin Timberlake.

Previously married to guitarist for Kelly Clarkson and songwriter Aben Eubanks, the couple were the subject of a Season 12 HGTV Property Brothers episode.

Arrison's influences include James Taylor, Sarah McLachlan and Ryan Adams.

== Discography ==
- Talking Circles (2008)
- Hearts on Parade (2010)

Arrison is also a credited contributor on the following songs or albums:

- Badly Drawn Boy, About a Boy (2002)
- Lindsay Lohan, A Little More Personal (Raw) (2005)

=== Songs written ===
Year	Artist	Album	Song
2013	Kelly Clarkson	—N/a	"Tie It Up"
2013	Kelly Clarkson	Wrapped in Red	"Wrapped in Red"
2013	Kelly Clarkson	Wrapped in Red	"Winter Dreams"
2015	Kacey Musgraves	Pageant Material	"Fine"
2018	Chevel Shepherd	—N/a	"Broken Hearts"
2020	Chevel Shepherd	—N/a	”Just Like The Circus”
