= Graham Colton =

American singer-songwriter (born 1981)

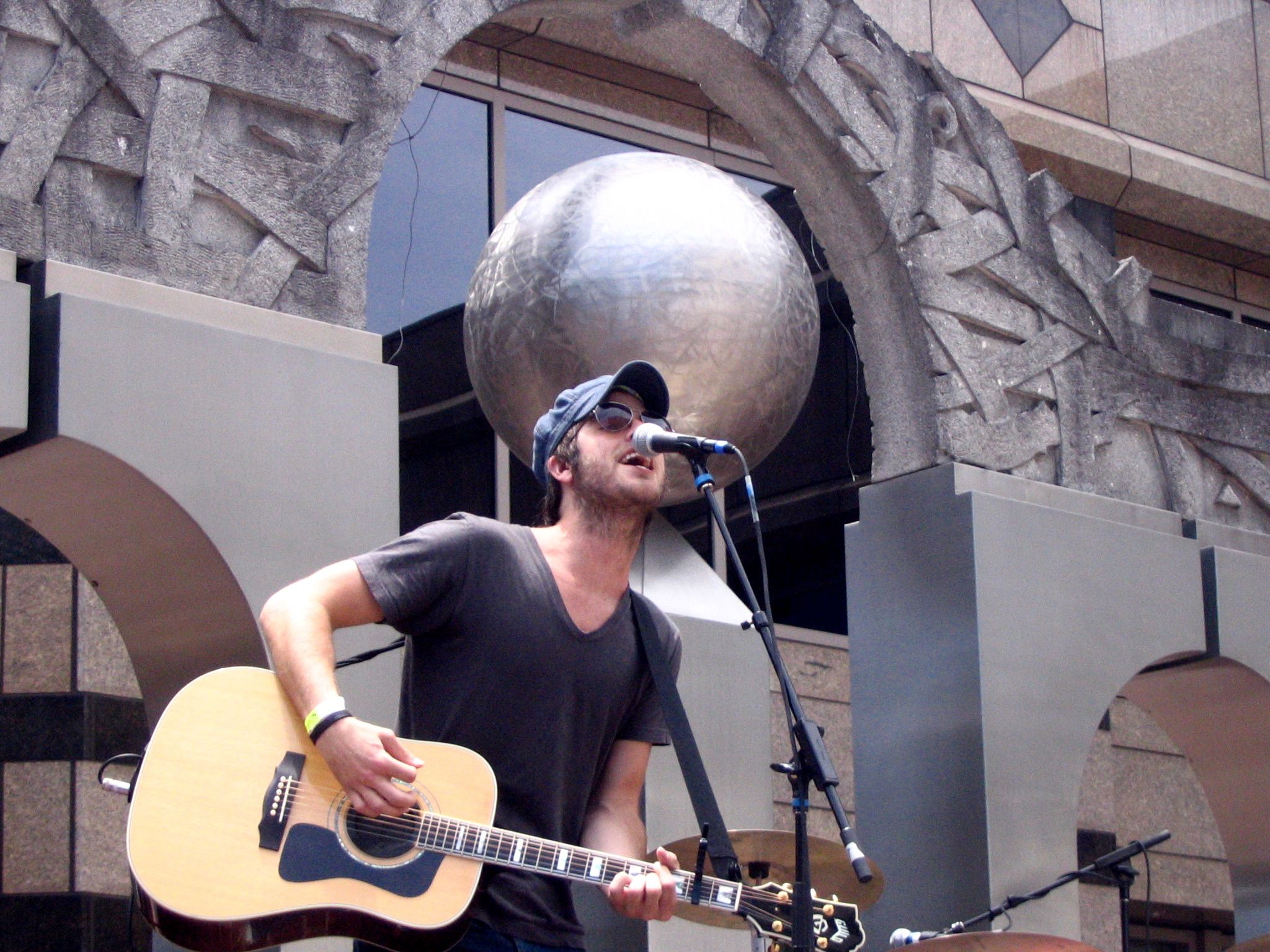
- Colton performing live on June 17, 2005 at City Stages in Birmingham, Alabama.

Background information
- Born: Graham Patrick Colton; November 6, 1981 (age 44); Oklahoma City, Oklahoma, United States
- Genres: Pop, rock
- Occupation: Singer-songwriter
- Instruments: Vocals, guitar
- Years active: 2002–present
- Label: Universal Republic
- Website: www.grahamcolton.com

Graham Colton (born November 6, 1981) is an American singer-songwriter from Oklahoma City, Oklahoma. His most recent album, Inside Out, was released on August 14, 2020. Colton's songs have been featured on numerous TV shows including American Idol, Pretty Little Liars, Kyle XY, Oprah's Big Give, Newport Harbor, Castle, Wildfire, October Road Fall promo, HBO Winter promo, Sundance promo, and many others.

He is an operating partner of The Jones Assembly, an acclaimed restaurant and 1700 capacity music venue located in downtown Oklahoma City. The Jones has hosted artists including Willie Nelson, Spoon, LANY, Ben Rector, Dwight Yoakam, Jenny Lewis and many more. He owns and operates Lunar Manor recording studio and collaborates regularly with Chad Copelin of Blackwatch Studios for various music projects.

== Early life ==
Colton graduated from Heritage Hall School, in Oklahoma City, Oklahoma. While there, he was the quarterback of the football team. Together with his childhood friend and teammate Wes Welker, former wide receiver and current Offensive Assistant for the Houston Texans, Colton led his team to a class 2A state championship in 1998 against the Tishomingo Indians. In the process, Colton and Welker set multiple state passing and receiving records, respectively.

== Career ==
=== Graham Colton Band ===
After leaving his hometown of Oklahoma City to attend Southern Methodist University, Colton began writing and performing songs in Dallas pubs and coffee houses. During this time, Colton perceived an appreciable demand for his music. Colton began recording songs for a growing local fan base; his self-titled demo, Graham Colton, became a local favorite and a top seller on the popular music website Awarestore.com.

Soon after, Colton formed the Graham Colton Band alongside Brian 'Turtle' Turton, Jordan Elder, Drew Nichols, & Ryan Tallent. The band's first trip outside of Texas included a tour stop at DC Sessions in Washington, DC. There, the band struck up a friendship with New Orleans band Better Than Ezra and frontman Kevin Griffin. They would perform with Better than Ezra off and on for the next 2 years and begin collaborating with Griffin on several songs.

Adam Duritz invited Colton to perform as a supporting act for the Counting Crows in their 2002 fall tour. Colton was invited for another tour in 2004.

The Graham Colton Band signed a record deal with Universal Records. The group started recording sessions with producer Brendan O'Brien at the Southern Tracks studio in Atlanta, GA. The resulting album Drive was released in May 2004. To support the album, performance dates were arranged with various high-profile acts, including John Mayer, O.A.R., Maroon 5 and the Dave Matthews Band. Guitarist Aben Eubanks served as an unofficial member of the band.

After extensive touring through 2006, the band officially parted ways.

=== Here Right Now ===
After spending the majority of 2005 on the road with Kelly Clarkson, who he also dated, Colton began writing songs for what would become his solo follow up, Here Right Now, which was released in late October 2007. The album debuted at No. 2 on the Billboard New Artist/Heatseeker chart, and No. 4 Pop Album/#11 Top Album charts on iTunes.

Upon release of the album, Graham returned to the road for a series of solo performances with Vanessa Carlton.

On March 10, 2008, Graham mentioned that a full tour would be announced in early 2008 for this album. He also performed to promote the album on the Today Show, The Late Late Show with Craig Ferguson, and the Late Show with David Letterman.

The lead track, "Best Days", was chosen as single of the week at iTunes and subsequently, Graham was named by its editors as a 'Top New Pop Artist' of '07. In addition, the track landed coverage in Billboard magazine with a 'Singles Review' and was the subject of their 'Breaking and Entering' feature.

The music video for the song was directed by highly acclaimed director Nigel Dick, and made its TRL debut on MTV shortly after it was filmed. MTV proceeded to use four songs from the album as part of their 'Featured Artist Program' for the hit show, Newport Harbor.

That year, Colton performed at a number of concerts and radio events alongside Vanessa Carlton, Colbie Caillat, John Mellencamp, as well as a U.S headlining tour.

Colton officially parted ways with Universal/Republic records in 2008 and quickly began writing songs for what would later become the Twenty Something EP. As a newly independent artist, Colton enlisted touring bandmates Chad Copelin & Jarod Evans to produce the EP at Blackwatch Studios in Norman, Oklahoma. Colton played several solo acoustic shows in support of the EP including a month of tour dates with longtime pals Needtobreathe.

=== Pacific Coast Eyes ===
Colton began recording songs with producer Tommy Walter in 2010 that would later become Pacific Coast Eyes. Officially released in April 2011, the album would be Colton's first official full length independent release. The album was highly praised and reached the top of the iTunes singer songwriter chart. Colton enlisted David Green and Jon Cooper to direct/produce the music video for "Pacific Coast Eyes". It was filmed in three days in Los Angeles. Colton would again embark on a US headlining tour as well as open for artists including Sheryl Crow, Toad the Wet Sprocket, Colin Hay, Mat Kearney, and Ben Rector. After writing a handful of new songs he chose to re-release the album in October 2011 as Pacific Coast Eyes Volume 2 adding three new songs and three bonus tracks.

=== Sooner The Sunset ===
Colton collaborated with Lindsey Ray in the summer of 2011 under the name Sooner the Sunset and recorded a handful of songs for a self-titled EP released October 2, 2012. The band's first single "All Because of You" was released on iTunes in March 2012.

=== Lonely Ones ===
Colton's latest album Lonely Ones, produced by Chad Copelin and Jarod Evans at Blackwatch Studios, was released on January 21, 2014. Lonely Ones was inspired by Colton's collaborations with Wayne Coyne of The Flaming Lips and features Steven Drozd of The Flaming Lips on guitar.

"Born To Raise Hell", the first music video from Lonely Ones, premiered on PopMatters on November 7, 2013. The song was inspired by a story told by Colton's co-producer Chad Copelin about his father picking up a hitchhiker in the 70s who turned out to be serial killer Richard Speck.

Colton released a series of live in-studio performances from the album called "The Lonely Sessions." In conjunction with the Lonely Ones Tour with Seattle indie band Cumulus, Colton released the Lonely Ones Tour EP on Noisetrade featuring two collaborations with The Flaming Lips frontman Wayne Coyne: "Don't Take My Sunshine Away," made popular by the band Sparklehorse, and an alternate version of "Another Night."

In August 2020, Colton released a digital album, Inside Out.

== Television performances ==
Graham made his national television debut on NBC's The Tonight Show with Jay Leno on Friday, February 2, 2008, with a full band performance of "Best Days" which included a three-piece string section. Shortly thereafter, he travelled to New York to perform on CBS' Late Show with David Letterman on March 13 and NBC's Today Show on the 14th, again with full band and strings. The next week, he performed on CBS' The Late Late Show with Craig Ferguson on March 19, with a stripped down acoustic performance with strings. The week after, he travelled back to New York for a solo acoustic performance on Live with Regis and Kelly on the 27th, making that the third consecutive week with a national television performance. On April 9, Graham returned to Los Angeles to perform on The Ellen DeGeneres Show.

== Discography ==
=== Studio albums ===
- 2007: Here Right Now [Billboard 200 #153]
- 2011: Pacific Coast Eyes
- 2014: Lonely Ones
- 2020: Inside Out

=== Independent albums ===
- 2002: Graham Colton

=== Studio albums (as Graham Colton Band) ===
- 2004: Drive

=== Live albums ===
- 2012: Live at Eddie's Attic

=== Extended plays ===
- 2009: Twenty Something EP
- 2009: Pictures on the Wall EP
- 2009: Dashboard Memory EP
- 2010: One by One EP
- 2010: Somewhere in Between EP
- 2010: Summertown EP
- 2011: Pacific Coast Eyes Volume 2 EP
- 2012: Sooner the Sunset EP (with Lindsey Ray)
- 2013: Foreshadow EP

== Music videos ==
- 2008: "Best Days"
- 2011: "Pacific Coast Eyes"
- 2013: "Born to Raise Hell"
- 2014: "The Lonely Sessions"
