= Aben Eubanks =

American musician and songwriter

- Born: Dallas, Texas, U.S.
- Occupations: Guitarist; songwriter; record producer
- Instruments: Banjo; guitar; percussion; piano
- Years active: 2004–present

Aben Eubanks is an American Grammy-nominated musician, songwriter, and producer. Eubanks began his career as a guitarist for Matt Nathanson in 2004 and for Graham Colton in 2005. In 2006, Eubanks joined Kelly Clarkson's band and together co-wrote several songs including "Sober" from the My December album, "Under the Mistletoe" a duet with Brett Eldredge, "Santa, Can't You Hear Me", a duet with Ariana Grande, both songs charted on the Billboard Holiday Hot 100. and appeared on the album When Christmas Comes Around which was nominated for a 2023 Grammy for the Best Traditional Pop Vocal Album. Eubanks also co-wrote "Broken Hearts" with Shane McAnally and Ashley Arrison, which Chevel Shepherd performed on the fifteenth season of The Voice, which reached number one on the Billboard Country Digital Songs Sales Chart. "Lighthouse", cowritten by Eubanks, is the first 2024 single from Kelly Clarkson's Chemistry album.

== Discography ==
Year	Artist	Album	Title	Writers	Producers
2007	Kelly Clarkson	My December	"Maybe"	Aben Eubanks, Kelly Clarkson, Jimmy Messer	David Kahne
2007	Kelly Clarkson	My December	"Be Still"	Aben Eubanks, Kelly Clarkson	David Kahne
2007	Kelly Clarkson	My December	"Sober"	Aben Eubanks, Kelly Clarkson, Jimmy Messer, Calamity McEntire	David Kahne
2007	Kelly Clarkson	My December	"Irvine"	Aben Eubanks, Kelly Clarkson	David Kahne
2009	Kelly Clarkson	All I Ever Wanted	"Ready"	Aben Eubanks, Kelly Clarkson, Jason Halbert	Howard Benson
2010	Anouck	For Bitter or Worse	"For Bitter or Worse"	Aben Eubanks, Anouck, Tore Johansson	
2011	Kelly Clarkson	Stronger	"Standing in Front of You"	Aben Eubanks, Kelly Clarkson	Jason Halbert
2013	Kelly Clarkson	Wrapped in Red	"Wrapped in Red"	Aben Eubanks, Kelly Clarkson, Shane McAnally, Ashley Arrison	Greg Kurstin
2013	Kelly Clarkson	Wrapped in Red	"Winter Dreams (Brandon's Song)"	Aben Eubanks, Kelly Clarkson, Ashley Arrison	Greg Kurstin
2013	Kelly Clarkson	Wrapped in Red	"Every Christmas"	Aben Eubanks, Kelly Clarkson	Greg Kurstin
2014	Eric Hutchinson	Pure Fiction	"Sun Goes Down"	Eric Hutchinson	Aben Eubanks
2014	Eric Hutchinson	Pure Fiction	"Goodnight Goodbye"	Eric Hutchinson	Aben Eubanks
2018	Chevel Shepherd	The Season 15 Collection (The Voice Performance)	"Broken Hearts"	Aben Eubanks, Shane McAnally, Ashley Arrison	
2021	Kelly Clarkson	When Christmas Comes Around...	"Santa, Can't You Hear Me" (feat. Ariana Grande)	Aben Eubanks, Kelly Clarkson	Jason Halbert
2021	Kelly Clarkson	When Christmas Comes Around...	"Merry Christmas (To The One I Used To Know)"	Aben Eubanks, Kelly Clarkson	Jason Halbert
2021	Kelly Clarkson	When Christmas Comes Around...	"Under the Mistletoe"	Aben Eubanks, Kelly Clarkson	Aben Eubanks, Jesse Shatkin
2021	Kelly Clarkson	When Christmas Comes Around...	"Merry Christmas Baby"	Aben Eubanks, Kelly Clarkson	Aben Eubanks, Jesse Shatkin
2023	Kelly Clarkson	Chemistry	"Lighthouse"	Aben Eubanks, Kelly Clarkson	
	Beyries	What About Hiding	"What About Hiding"	Aben Eubanks, Amelie Beyries	Aben Eubanks
