= Tie It Up =

Single by Kelly Clarkson
- Released: June 25, 2013
- Recorded: 2012
- Genre: Country blues
- Length: 2:47
- Label: RCA; Columbia Nashville
- Songwriters: Ashley Arrison; Shane McAnally; Josh Osborne
- Producer: Shane McAnally

Kelly Clarkson singles chronology
"People Like Us" (2013)	"Tie It Up" (2013)	"Underneath the Tree" (2013)

Music video
- "Tie It Up" on YouTube

"Tie It Up" is a song by American recording artist Kelly Clarkson, written by Ashley Arrison, Shane McAnally and Josh Osborne and released as a stand-alone single by RCA Records and Columbia Nashville on June 25, 2013.

== Background and release ==
"Tie It Up" was written by Ashley Arrison, Shane McAnally and Josh Osborne. It marked Clarkson's second solo country single and her third as a main act, following the country reissue of "Mr. Know It All" (2012), and "Don't Rush" (2012). It was released as a digital download on June 25, 2013 worldwide, making it her first country single to receive an international release. It was sent exclusively to country radio stations on July 5, 2013 by Columbia Nashville, making it her second release under the "Columbia" brand. On the photo cover of the single, Clarkson's real life fiancé (now ex-husband), Brandon Blackstock, is on the other side of the picture, but only his hand can be seen.

== Composition ==
"Tie It Up" is a country blues song about marriage proposals and wedding plans. It opens with an "I Love Rock 'n' Roll"-style guitar loop, with Clarkson singing the tale of spotting her groom across a room, it then interpolates to a chorus where she invites him to set the date, hire a band, and ultimately inviting him to "tie it up", accompanied by a sound of wedding bells. Amy Sciarretto of PopCrush remarked that even though the song had twanged-out guitars and groove, it's not quite a full-on country jam", describing it as "a ballsy rocker, full of hand-on-the-hip sass". She also noted that Clarkson's voice is "big and soulful, that's why this song doesn't feel, well, married to one genre", and compared it to a "mid-'90s Alanis Morissette."

== Critical reception ==
Andy Scott of Celebuzz described "Tie It Up" as the anti-"Single Ladies", writing that the song "takes on the melody of "You Oughta Know" (kind of, but much more positive) as it tells the story of a woman who really, really, really wants to set the date". Sam Lansky of Idolator wrote that the song "may not be a mainstream radio smash, but it sounds like the kind of thing that'll go over pretty well in the heartland (probably better than, say, "Hole")."

== Chart performance ==
Following its release as a single, "Tie It Up" entered the Billboard Country Airplay chart at number 52 on the week ending July 6, 2013. For the chart week ending July 13, 2013 it entered the Billboard Bubbling Under Hot 100 Singles chart at number 12 with sales of 29,000 downloads. The same week it debuted at number 33 on the Billboard Hot Country Songs chart. Internationally, it peaked at number 79 in Canada and at number 3 in South Korea.

== Music video ==
=== Background ===
Clarkson announced plans to release an accompanying lyric video for "Tie It Up", in which she requested fans to submit wedding photos to be included in the video. On July 16, 2013, Clarkson tweeted that she had scrapped the lyric video and will now have the wedding photos used in the official music video.

The video premiered on Vevo on August 14, 2013, and was directed by Weiss Eubanks.

=== Synopsis ===
The music video includes photos and video footages submitted by fans, originally intended for a lyric video. The video shows various scenes from weddings, like cutting the cake, brides and bridesmaids, throwing the bouquet, dancing at the wedding reception, walking down the aisle and first kisses. The couples shown include gay couples. Clarkson, a bride-to-be herself when the video was filmed, portrays a singer singing at a barnyard wedding as she is accompanied by her band. She wears a short white dress and performs barefoot. Clarkson also wears her actual engagement ring and shows it several times to the camera. In the end Clarkson catches the bride's bouquet and winks at the camera.

=== Reception ===
The music video received mostly positive reviews by critics, who noticed the included gay couples. Chris Spargo from NewNowNext.com pointed out: "This is, we assume, the first mainstream, country music video featuring gay couples."

== Live performances ==
Clarkson first performed "Tie It Up" at the 2013 CMA Music Festival, which aired in the United States on ABC on August 12, 2013. She performed it live at the Stadium of Fire on July 4, 2013. She also performed it on The View on October 9, 2013.

== Track listing ==
Digital download – single

No.	Title	Writer(s)	Length
1.	"Tie It Up"	Ashley Arrison, Shane McAnally, Josh Osborne	2:47

== Charts ==
Chart (2013)	Peak position
Canada Hot 100 (Billboard)	79
South Korea International Singles (GAON)	3
US Bubbling Under Hot 100 (Billboard)	12
US Digital Song Sales (Billboard)	63
US Country Airplay (Billboard)	33
US Hot Country Songs (Billboard)	33

== Radio and release history ==
List of release dates, showing region, release format, and label
Region	Date	Format	Label
Australia	June 25, 2013	Digital download – single	Sony Music Entertainment
Austria	June 25, 2013	Digital download – single	Sony Music Entertainment
Belgium	June 25, 2013	Digital download – single	Sony Music Entertainment
Canada	June 25, 2013	Digital download – single	Sony Music Entertainment
Denmark	June 25, 2013	Digital download – single	Sony Music Entertainment
Finland	June 25, 2013	Digital download – single	Sony Music Entertainment
France	June 25, 2013	Digital download – single	Sony Music Entertainment
Germany	June 25, 2013	Digital download – single	Sony Music Entertainment
Ireland	June 25, 2013	Digital download – single	Sony Music Entertainment
Italy	June 25, 2013	Digital download – single	Sony Music Entertainment
New Zealand	June 25, 2013	Digital download – single	Sony Music Entertainment
Sweden	June 25, 2013	Digital download – single	Sony Music Entertainment
Switzerland	June 25, 2013	Digital download – single	Sony Music Entertainment
United Kingdom	June 25, 2013	Digital download – single	RCA Records
United States	June 25, 2013	Digital download – single	RCA Records
United States	July 8, 2013	Country radio	RCA Records, Columbia Nashville
