= Broken Hearts (song) =

Single by Chevel Shepherd
- Released: December 17, 2018
- Recorded: 2018
- Genre: Country
- Length: 3:37
- Label: Republic
- Songwriter(s): Ashley Arrison; Aben Eubanks; Shane McAnally

"Broken Hearts" is a song by American country singer Chevel Shepherd. It is Shepherd's coronation song following her victory on the 15th season of The Voice. It was written by Ashley Arrison, Aben Eubanks, and Shane McAnally.

== Background ==
"Broken Hearts" which was written by Ashley Arrison, Aben Eubanks, and Shane McAnally, was originally intended for Kelly Clarkson to record. Clarkson didn't have time to record it but still held on to it, eventually giving it to Shepherd.

== Chart performance ==
The song debuted at number 24 on the Billboard Hot Country Songs chart, and number 1 on the Billboard Country Digital Song Sales chart.

== Charts ==
Chart (2018)	Peak position
US Hot Country Songs (Billboard)	24
US Country Digital Songs	1
