= 35 MPH Town =

Studio album by Toby Keith
- Released: October 9, 2015
- Genre: Country
- Length: 34:29
- Label: Show Dog-Universal Music
- Producers: Toby Keith; Bobby Pinson; Mac McAnally

Toby Keith chronology
Drinks After Work (2013)	35 MPH Town (2015)	The Bus Songs (2017)

Singles from 35 MPH Town
- 1. "Drunk Americans" Released: October 14, 2014; 2. "35 MPH Town" Released: April 13, 2015; 3. "Beautiful Stranger" Released: October 26, 2015

35 MPH Town (also known as 35 mph TOWN) is the twentieth studio album by American country music artist Toby Keith. It was released on October 9, 2015 by Show Dog-Universal Music.

== Commercial performance ==
35 MPH Town debuted on the Billboard 200 at No. 14 and Top Country Albums at No. 2, with 19,000 copies sold in its first week. The album sold a further 6,700 copies in the US in the second week.

== Track listing ==
No.	Title	Writer(s)	Length
1.	"Drunk Americans"	Brandy Clark; Bob DiPiero; Shane McAnally	3:20
2.	"Good Gets Here"	Toby Keith; Bobby Pinson	2:20
3.	"35 MPH Town"	Keith; Pinson	3:40
4.	"Rum Is the Reason"	Keith; Scotty Emerick	3:17
5.	"What She Left Behind"	Keith; Pinson	3:32
6.	"10 Foot Pole"	Keith; Pinson	2:55
7.	"Haggard, Hank & Her"	Keith; Pinson	3:20
8.	"Sailboat for Sale" (with Jimmy Buffett)	Keith; Pinson	3:08
9.	"Every Time I Drink I Fall in Love"	Keith; Rivers Rutherford	3:40
10.	"Beautiful Stranger"	Keith; Pinson	4:17

== Personnel ==
Vocals

- Lead vocals – Toby Keith
- Background vocals – Greg Barnhill, Scotty Emerick, Paige Logan, Mac McAnally, Mica Roberts
- Featured vocals – Jimmy Buffett on "Sailboat For Sale"

Instruments

- Accordion – John Deaderick, Jim Hoke
- Acoustic guitar – Scotty Emerick, Kenny Greenberg, Mac McAnally, Danny Rader, Rivers Rutherford, Bobby Terry, Ilya Toshinsky
- Banjo – Danny Rader
- Bass guitar – Kevin "Swine" Grantt, Rachel Loy, Jim Mayer, Michael Rhodes
- Cello – Anthony LaMarchina, Emily Nelson
- Drums – Chad Cromwell, Fred Eltringham, Roger Guth
- Electric guitar – Kenny Greenberg, Brent Mason, Adam Shoenfeld
- Fiddle – Eamon McLoughlin
- Hammond B-3 organ – Tim Lauer
- Mandolin – Aubrey Haynie, Danny Rader, Ilya Toshinsky
- Pedal steel guitar – Doyle Grisham, Russ Pahl
- Percussion – Eric Darken, Kenny Greenberg, Mills Logan
- Piano – John Deaderick, Charlie Judge, Tim Lauer
- Saxophone – Roman Dudok
- Steel drums – Robert Greenidge
- Synthesizer – Charlie Judge
- Trombone – Carl Murr
- Trumpet – Jay Jennings
- Vibraphone – Eric Darken
- Viola – Elizabeth Lamb, Jim Larson
- Violin – Carolyn Bailey, David Davidson, Charles Dixon, Adrienne Harmon
- Wurlitzer – Tim Lauer, Steve Nathan

Production

- Assistant – Jarad Clement, Alex Jarvis, Ernesto Olvera, Lowell Reynolds, Robby Schneider, Nick Spezia, Mike Stankiewicz, Misha Williams Tristan
- Assistant Engineer – Nick Spezia
- Conductor – Charlie Judge
- Editing – Brady Barnett, Jed Hackett, Alex Jarvis
- Engineering – Mills Logan
- Mastering – Ken Love
- Mixing – Mills Logan
- Production – Mac McAnally, Bobby Pinson, Toby Keith
- Production Coordination – Bud Fox

Imagery

- Art direction – Susannah Parrish
- Creative Director – Natalie Moore
- Design – Susannah Parrish
- Photography – Greg Watermann

== Chart performance ==
=== Weekly charts ===
Chart (2015)	Peak position
Australian Albums (ARIA)	43
UK Country	7
US Billboard 200	14
US Top Country Albums (Billboard)	2

=== Year-end charts ===
Chart (2015)	Position
US Top Country Albums (Billboard)	70
