= Sarah Darling =

American singer-songwriter

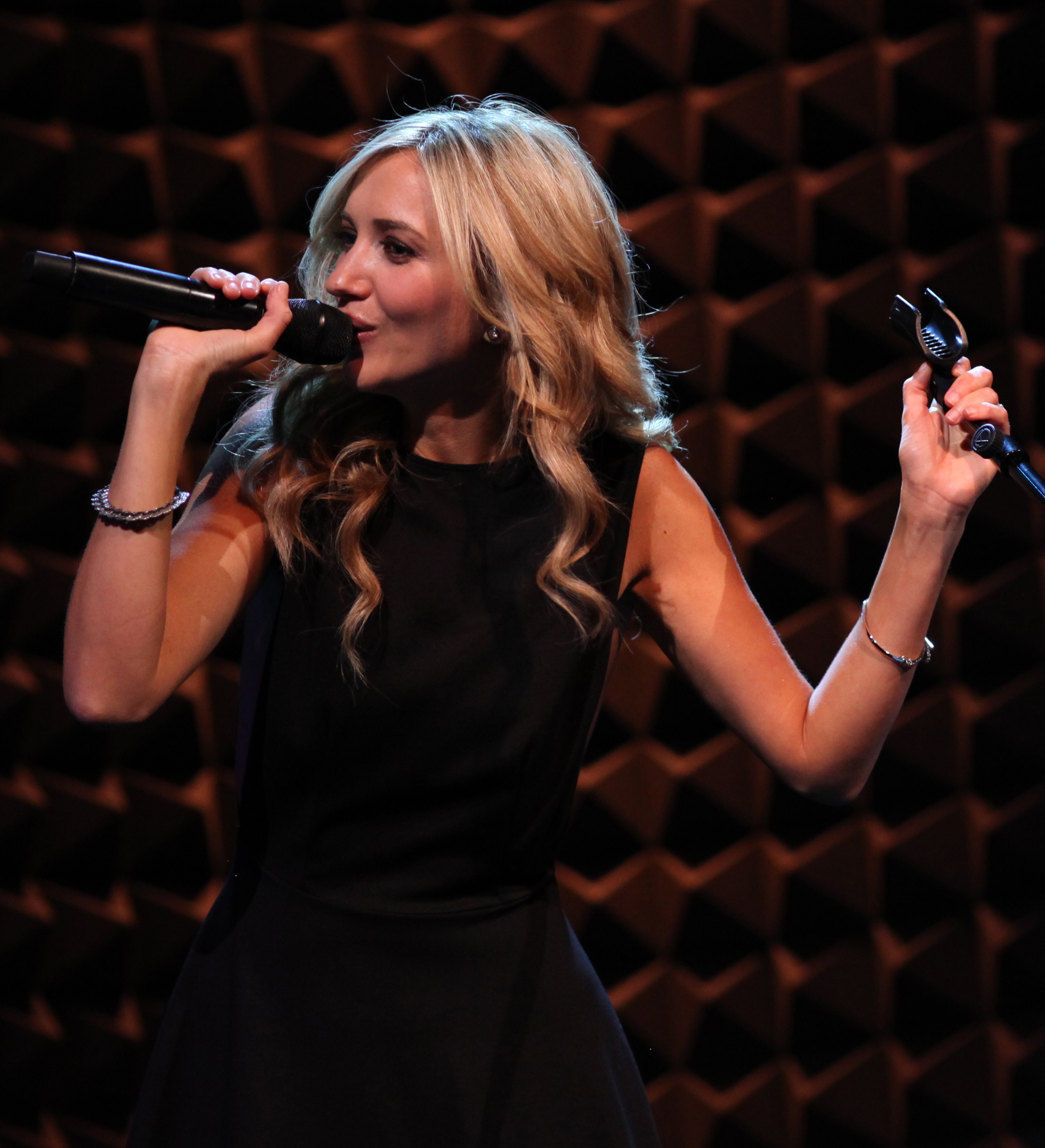
- Sarah Darling performing at Joe's Pub

Background information
- Born: Sarah Ann Darling; October 4, 1982 (age 44); Des Moines, Iowa, US
- Genre: Country
- Occupation: Singer-songwriter
- Years active: 2003–present
- Label: Be Darling Records (2013–present) Black River (2008–2013)
- Website: www.sarahdarling.com

Sarah Ann Darling (born October 4, 1982) is an American country music singer and songwriter. She has worked and toured in Nashville, Los Angeles, and the UK. Her 2019 album, Wonderland, reached #1 on the official UK Country Charts.

== Career ==
In 2003, Darling made her name first known to the public when she was a top four finalist on E! Entertainment Television's reality show The Entertainer, hosted by Wayne Newton. She did not win the show as Newton believed she was not right for Las Vegas and advised her to head to Nashville to focus on country music.

Sarah Darling went into the studio in the summer of 2008 to record her debut album, Every Monday Morning, which was released on June 16, 2009. Her single "Jack of Hearts" successfully made its debut on Country Music Television's top 20 countdown. A second album, Angels & Devils, was released on February 15, 2011, following its lead single "Something to Do With Your Hands" and a digital single release of the U2 cover "With or Without You". To promote the single, Black River Music Group arranged for Darling to sing the national anthem for a Buffalo Sabres game in place of usual singer Doug Allen; the Sabres and Black River are both owned by Terrence Pegula.

In late 2012, a new single titled "Home to Me," was released to digital retailers on August 21, 2012, after being previously featured on Sirius XM's The Highway country-music station. It sold over 8,000 copies in the first week of release becoming the top selling digital single from a new female artist since May 2011 when Lauren Alaina released "Like My Mother Does". "Home to Me" became Darling's first single to chart on the U.S. Billboard Hot Country Songs chart, reaching a peak of number 34. "Home To Me" was issued to radio, in multiple versions, customized for different states.

However, after releasing a digital EP, Home to Me, on January 29, 2013, Darling and Black River Entertainment parted ways.

Darling released "Little Umbrellas," independently on June 4, 2013, to digital retailers. It was also issued to country radio on June 24, 2013, though it failed to chart.

Darling has been featured on TBS' CONAN, FOX & Friends, HLN Morning Express with Robin Meade, ABC's The Bachelor, Better TV and many additional news outlets. She wrote the song "Knowing What I Know About Heaven," which was recorded and released by Guy Penrod, and has a passion for baking.

Darling was a contestant on ABC's Rising Star first season in 2014, and was eliminated in the fourth week. However, after her elimination Brad Paisley, one of the show's judges, invited Darling to perform with him at the Grand Ole Opry.

On February 10, 2017, Darling self-released her Dream Country album, a compilation of songs that provided a glimpse into her new musical direction. Dream Country was well received in both the US and UK with over 4 million streams on Spotify and Apple Music.

In 2016, 2017, 2018 and 2019, Darling performed at the C2C: Country to Country festival, the largest country music event in Europe.

On February 20, 2018, Darling teased her new single "Wasted" ahead of an upcoming tour in the UK and Ireland. She performed at the British Summertime Festival in Hyde Park in June 2018.

On June 7, 2019, Darling released the album Wonderland which climbed to the top of the official UK Country Artist Album Charts. She performed at Nashville Meets London in July, British Country Music Festival in September, and on November 22, 2019, Darling released her single "Divide" featuring Ward Thomas.

Throughout 2020, Darling conducted several concerts over live stream and returned to the live stage in June 2021.

In 2022 she released the five song EP, Darling, which was followed by her most recent full-length album, Canyon, on October 4, 2024.

In addition to her solo work, Darling also performs extensively with Six One Five Collective.

== Rising Star ==
Stage	Song	Original Artist	Result
Audition	"Merry Go 'Round"	Kacey Musgraves	Advanced
Duels	"I Hope You Dance" (vs. Megan Tibbits)	Lee Ann Womack	Eliminated

== Discography ==
=== Studio albums ===
Title	Details	Peak chart positions		
Title	Details	US Country	UK Country	UK Indie
Every Monday Morning	Released: June 16, 2009; Label: Black River; Formats: CD, music download	—	—	—
Angels & Devils	Released: February 15, 2011; Label: Black River; Formats: CD, music download	—	—	—
Dream Country	Released: February 10, 2017; Label: Be Darling; Formats: CD, LP, music download	—	—	—
Winter Wonderland	Released: November 17, 2017; Label: Be Darling; Formats: CD, music download	—	—	—
Wonderland	Released: June 7, 2019; Label: Be Darling; Formats: CD, LP, music download	—	1	19
Canyon	Released: October 4, 2024; Label: Be Darling; Formats: LP, music download	—	—	—

=== Extended plays ===
Title	Details	Songs
Home to Me	Released: January 29, 2013; Label: Black River; Formats: CD, music download	
Have a Merry Little Christmas Darling	Released: November 19, 2013; Label: Be Darling; Formats: CD, music download	
Campfire Sessions: Wide Open Spaces	Released: July 10, 2020; Label: Be Darling; Formats: Music download	Wide Open Spaces (3:52); Bring on the Rain (2:51); Leave the Pieces (3:43); Cowboy Take Me Away (4:28); I May Hate Myself in the Morning (3:30); You're Still the One (2:43)
California Gurls (The Campfire Sessions)	Released: October 2, 2020; Label: Be Darling; Formats: Music download	California Gurls (4:42)
Dreams (The Campfire Sessions)	Released: July 30, 2021; Label: Be Darling; Formats: Music download	Dreams (3:46); Sweet Surrender (3:56); One of Us (3:22)
Darling	Released: May 20, 2022; Label: Tone Tree Music / Sarah Darling; Formats: Music download	Waves (3:29); Song Still Gets Me (3:44); Pretender (3:20); Hungover (3:10); Get to Me (3:51)

=== Singles ===
Year	Single	Peak chart positions		Album
Year	Single	US Country	US Country Airplay	Album
2009	"Jack of Hearts"	—	—	Every Monday Morning
2009	"Whenever It Rains"	—	—	Every Monday Morning
2010	"With or Without You"	—	—	Angels & Devils
2011	"Something to Do With Your Hands"	—	—	Angels & Devils
2011	"O Holy Night"	—	—	—N/a
2012	"Blackbird"	—	—	Let Us In: Nashville
2012	"Home to Me"	34	44	Home to Me
2013	"Little Umbrellas"	—	—	—N/a
2016	"You Take Me All the Way"	—	—	Dream Country
2016	"Please, Please, Please Let Me Get What I Want"	—	—	Dream Country
2017	"Halley's Comet"	—	—	Dream Country
2018	"Wasted"	—	—	—N/a
2018	"Diamonds"	—	—	Wonderland
2018	"Call Me"	—	—	Wonderland
2019	"Fire"	—	—	Wonderland
2019	"Enjoy the Ride"	—	—	Wonderland
2019	"A Little Bit of Rain"	—	—	—N/a
2019	"Divide" (featuring Ward Thomas)	—	—	—N/a
2019	"Forever and Always" (featuring Sam Outlaw)	—	—	TBA
2020	California Gurls (The Campfire Sessions)	—	—	—N/a
"—" denotes releases that did not chart

=== Music videos ===
Year	Title	Director(s)
2009	"Jack of Hearts"	Ryan Smith
2009	"Whenever It Rains"	Scottsdale Community College
2009	"Can't Call Love"	Scottsdale Community College
2009	"I Never Do What I Should"	Full Sail University
2009	"It Don't Matter Now (Missing You)"	Full Sail University
2011	"Something to Do With Your Hands"	Stephen Shepherd
2011	"O Holy Night"	Robert Swope
2012	"Blackbird"	D'Amico, Mayer, Ross
2012	"Home to Me"	Becky Fluke
2013	"Little Umbrellas"	Stokes Nielson
2016	"You Take Me All the Way"	
2016	"Please, Please, Please Let Me Get What I Want"	Kris D'Amico
2017	"Halley's Comet"	Mike Halsey
2017	"Where Cowboys Ride"	Benjamin Kutsko

== Tours ==
Headlining

- UK & Ireland Tour (2018)
- Wonderland Tour (2019)
- 2021 Tour (2021)

Supporting

- Weekend Roadtrip Tour (2013) with Scotty McCreery
