= Drunk Americans =

Single by Toby Keith

Single by Toby Keith

from the album 35 MPH Town
- Released: October 14, 2014
- Genre: Country
- Length: 3:20
- Label: Show Dog-Universal Music
- Songwriters: Brandy Clark; Bob DiPiero; Shane McAnally
- Producer: Toby Keith

Toby Keith singles chronology
"Shut Up and Hold On" (2013)	"Drunk Americans" (2014)	"35 MPH Town" (2015)

"Drunk Americans" is a song written by Brandy Clark, Bob DiPiero and Shane McAnally and recorded by American country music artist Toby Keith. It was released in October 2014 as the first single from his album 35 MPH Town.

== Content ==
The song celebrates social unity among American people of various backgrounds who all participate in drinking alcohol. Brandy Clark, one of the song's three writers, told Rolling Stone that "We wanted to write it sort of like a modern day 'Piano Man'... It's like 'When we're in here drinking, who cares what we are outside of this?'"

== Edits ==
The version released to most radio stations replaces the line "We just raise up our glass, we don't give a rat's ass" from the chorus with "[…]we don't care, we don't ask" from the first and final chorus. and "[…]we don't judge, we don't laugh" from the second chorus.

== Critical reception ==
Taste of Country reviewed the single favorably, saying that "The woozy waltz adds a hint of inclusive social commentary to allow it to stand out from the rest."

== Music video ==
The music video was directed by Michael Salomon and premiered in November 2014.

== Chart performance ==
On the Country Airplay chart dated for November 1, 2014, "Drunk Americans" debuted at number 31. The song was the week's highest debut, and the most added song to country radio playlists that week. It was the last Top 40 hit in Keith’s career until 2021’s “Old School” which peaked at #25. The song sold 15,000 downloads in its first week of release.

=== Weekly charts ===
Weekly chart performance for "Drunk Americans"
Chart (2014–2015)	Peak position
US Country Airplay (Billboard)	27
US Hot Country Songs (Billboard)	33

=== Year-end charts ===
Year-end chart performance for "Drunk Americans"
Chart (2015)	Position
US Country Airplay (Billboard)	99
