= Jo Smith =

American country music singer

- Also known as: Joanna Smith
- Born: Joanna Shae Smith; May 9, 1985 (age 41)
- Origin: Crestview, Georgia, U.S.
- Genres: Country
- Occupation: Singer-songwriter
- Instruments: Vocals, Guitar
- Years active: 2007–present
- Labels: Columbia Nashville; RCA Nashville; SMACKRecords

Joanna Smith is an American country music singer. Before graduating from Vanderbilt University in 2018, she attended Auburn University for one year before pursuing a music career by playing with Mustang Sally at age eighteen. After leaving the band she began songwriting and recording demos. After signing to a publishing contract with Big Borrassa Music, she wrote two songs for other artists, including "Flying By", which was recorded by Billy Ray Cyrus on his 2007 album Home at Last. Also in 2007, Smith's rendition of "The Battle Hymn of the Republic" was included on the Song of America compilation album.

In 2010, she signed a contract with Columbia Records Nashville and released her debut single, "Gettin' Married". The song charted on Hot Country Songs and was made into a music video, directed by Trey Fanjoy.

Stormy Lewis of Roughstock gave Smith's song a four-star rating, comparing it to the Dixie Chicks and Lorrie Morgan. Jim Malec, writing for American Twang, gave it a thumbs-down, calling Smith's vocal "shrill and thin". In August 2011, Sony Music Nashville announced that Smith and labelmate Bradley Gaskin will transfer to BNA Records as part of a corporate restructuring. After BNA closed, she moved again to RCA. That label released her third single, "We Can't Be Friends". It received 4.5 stars from Taste of Country. A fourth single, "Girls Are Crazy", was released to country radio on April 29, 2013.

In 2014 Joanna, also known as Jo, signed a publishing deal with Shane McAnally's company SMACKSongs. In 2016 she released an EP under the name Jo Smith called Introducing Jo Smith. The EP was produced by Shane McAnally (Kacey Musgraves, Sam Hunt, Old Dominion) and Jesse Frasure (Thomas Rhett). The lead single, "Old School Groove" was released as a Sirius XM Highway Find in early 2017. She has been included in Nashville Lifestyles' 2017 Ones to Watch, Rolling Stone Country's New Artists You Need to Know, and premiered the music video for "Old School Groove" on CMT. Currently she is the cohost on Coffee Country and Cody on Circle TV network.

== Discography ==
=== Extended plays ===
Title	Details
Georgia Mud	Release date: June 7, 2011; Label: Columbia Nashville
Be What It Wants to Be	Release date: March 13, 2012; Label: Columbia Nashville
Introducing Jo Smith	Release date: October 14, 2016; Label: SMACKRecords

=== Singles ===
Year	Single	Peak chart positions		Album
Year	Single	US Country	US Country Airplay	Album
2010	"Gettin' Married"	55	—	Georgia Mud
2011	"Georgia Mud"	57	—	Georgia Mud
2012	"We Can't Be Friends"	55	52	Be What It Wants to Be
2013	"Girls Are Crazy"	—	—	—N/a
2017	"Old School Groove"	—	—	Introducing Jo Smith
"—" denotes releases that did not chart

=== Music videos ===
Year	Video	Director
2010	"Gettin' Married"	Trey Fanjoy
2012	"We Can't Be Friends"	Ry Cox
2017	"Old School Groove"	Jor.by
