= Pageant Material =

Studio album by Kacey Musgraves
- Released: June 23, 2015
- Studios: RCA Studio A (Nashville, Tennessee)
- Length: 46:23
- Label: Mercury Nashville
- Producers: Luke Laird; Shane McAnally; Kacey Musgraves

Kacey Musgraves chronology
Same Trailer Different Park (2013)	Pageant Material (2015)	A Very Kacey Christmas (2016)

Singles from Pageant Material
- 1. "Biscuits" Released: March 16, 2015; 2. "Dime Store Cowgirl" Released: August 3, 2015

Pageant Material is the second studio album by American singer-songwriter Kacey Musgraves, released June 23, 2015, through Mercury Nashville. Musgraves co-wrote all 13 tracks and co-produced the album with Luke Laird and Shane McAnally. The album made numerous "Best Albums of 2015" lists and was nominated for Best Country Album at the 58th Grammy Awards.

== Background ==
On Pageant Material, Musgraves continues to explore themes of small-town life and staying grounded. She noted that country music often draws on "real things" people experience in everyday life, which she wanted to reflect beyond typical breakup songs. Calling the album as "nature of [her]", she said the record reflects her discomfort with being judged on superficial expectations, particularly those placed on women. She remarked that in the American South, people are often judged on such standards, adding that she would "rather lose for what I am than win for something that I'm not".

"You can't have a potty mouth or an opinion. In the South, getting judged on superficial stuff is a real thing. And I'm not attacking the people that might get something positive out of pageantry; I'm just not into being judged in that way."

The album was inspired by classic country and pop records by artists such as Glen Campbell, Jim Croce, Bobbie Gentry, Marty Robbins, Roger Miller, and Charley Pride. She explained that she aimed for a consistent tone across the album and entered the recording process with a clearer artistic vision.

== Recording and production ==
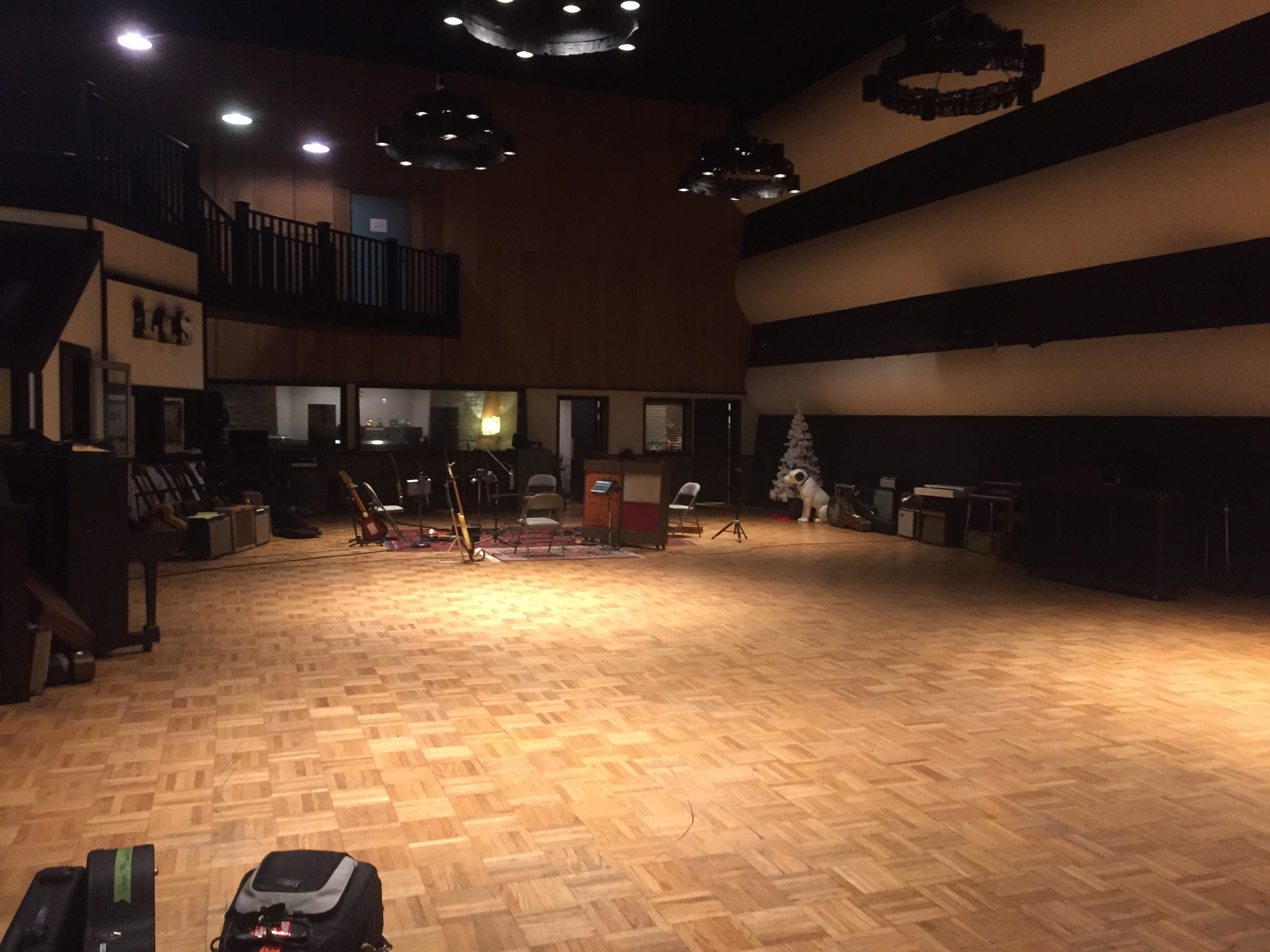
RCA Studio A, where most of Pageant Material's songs were recorded

Most of Pageant Material was recorded live in Nashville's historic RCA Studio A. In an interview with The Boot published May 21, 2015, Musgraves described the recording process: "We recorded most everything in a big circle in one of my favorite old studios on the planet – historic RCA Studio A in Nashville. That lent itself to the record having that concise feel that we wanted. Then we added a 10-piece string section later." Musgraves also said that recording Pageant Material was more exciting because she had a clearer sense of her artistic direction. She further noted that most of the album was recorded live with musicians performing together in the same room, which gave the record a more concise and classic sound compared to her previous record Same Trailer Different Park (2013). The album was largely recorded live, with Musgraves joined by her touring band and additional studio musicians.

Musgraves said her voice had improved since Same Trailer Different Park and that she had a clearer sense of the musical direction she wanted to pursue while working on the album. She also noted that the artwork was being finalized during the process. Musgraves' younger sister, Kelly Christine Sutton, is credited with the album cover's photograph and design. As noted by Christina Vinson of Taste of Country, the album cover features Musgraves against a "shiny red backdrop", wearing a tiara and styled with voluminous hair.

== Composition ==
Pageant Material pays homage to the traditional country sound of Musgraves' influences, including Dolly Parton, Loretta Lynn, and Willie Nelson, the latter of whom makes a guest appearance. Musgraves co-wrote every track in the album, producing them with Luke Laird and Shane McAnally. Across its 13 tracks, the album blends country with elements of rock and occasional surf rock influences, offering softer sounds. It continues Musgraves' reflections on life, relationships and her career, while maintaining what Angela Stefano of Taste of Country described as an "if it ain't broke, don't fix it" approach to her sound and collaborators. The singer also approaches small-town life in a way that is "sometimes harsh but more often affectionate", incorporating "irreverent philosophical musings" delivered with a "sly sense of humor", as noted by Bob Paxman of Nash Country Weekly. Helen Brown of The Daily Telegraph described the record as a "successful repetition of the formula", noting its "sweet, crisp country licks" and "witty twists of live-and-let-live philosophy".

Critics also highlighted Musgraves' songwriting. Spin's Brennan Carley noted that the storytelling of Pageant Material is expansive enough to "fill a memoir". Joe Breen of The Irish Times wrote that it inherits the attitude of her debut but is more measured and reserved, staying conscious of its Nashville roots while continuing to "rock the lyrical boat". Several critics noted the pedal steel sound inherent in Pageant Material; (Note: Attributed to Taste of Country, Country Standard Time, and Uncut) Pitchfork's Jessica Hopper depicted the album as having an "analog and organic" sound, with Musgraves backed by a small band and arrangements featuring pedal steel and occasional string sections. The reviewer also observed that the album's songs avoid dramatic buildups, writing that the choruses "do not explode, they merely unfurl".

=== Songs ===
Built around pedal steel and banjo with a hand-clapped rhythm, "Biscuits" accompanies lyrics about "treatise on privacy", according to Randall Roberts of Los Angeles Times. British newspaper The Guardian's Grady Smith noted that it lyrically reflects Musgraves' recurring perspective of personal independence, with the chorus advising listeners to "mind your own biscuits, and life will be gravy" as a playful call to ignore outside judgment and live freely. "Dime Store Cowgirl" references milestones from Musgraves' early career, while highlighting her "humble roots" and continued attachment to her hometown. According to Country Universe's Jonathan Keefe, the song adopts a more "different" tone than some of Musgraves' earlier singles, emphasizing "humility and self-deprecation"; its lyrics combine references to milestones in her career with more everyday experiences. The title track was described by Musgraves as a "satirical song" that "pokes fun" at herself and her imperfections, inspired by imagery of a hazy, retro-style beauty pageant. "This Town" opens with a spoken-word recording of Musgraves' grandmother telling a story, which Musgraves had secretly recorded prior to her death. "High Time" and "Fine" deliver slow-paced and atmospheric, with a hazy quality.

== Release and promotion ==
Pageant Material was announced on May 12, 2015. Promotional appearances in the media to support the album included several performances, such as The Tonight Show Starring Jimmy Fallon (June 9) and Late Night with Seth Meyers (June 10). The album was released on June 23, and she performed in Good Morning America that day to celebrate its release. A day later, she performed at The View and more live performances in Jimmy Kimmel Live! (September 15), CMA Awards (November 5), The Late Show with Stephen Colbert (January 8, 2016) and The Late Late Show with James Corden (April 6). On June 26, 2015, Musgraves performed "Follow Your Arrow" for National Public Radio's Tiny Desk Concerts in support of the legalization of same-sex marriage in the United States, which took place on the same day.

=== Singles ===
Musgraves had performed "Biscuits" during her tour prior to its official release, including a performance at the Ryman Auditorium where many radio programmers first heard the song. The track was later announced as the lead single from her then-upcoming second album, released on March 2 as the album's first promotional single. Two weeks later, it was sent to country radio, being the album's first single. Co-written by Musgraves, Shane McAnally, and Brandy Clark, Musgraves said the song's inspiration is "just good ol' plum country fun". Its music video was released on June 10, premiering on BuzzFeed Music and serving as a "whimsical homage" to vintage television variety shows such as Laugh-In and The Lawrence Welk Show. Pageant Material's second single, "Dime Store Cowgirl", was first released on June 16, as the promotional single. It was sent to country radio on August 3, becoming the album's second single. She performed the track at Jimmy Kimmel Live on September 15 and 2015 CMA Awards on November 4, with a stage set decorated with glitter, unicorns and rainbows, inspired from the concept of Lisa Frank.

=== Tour ===
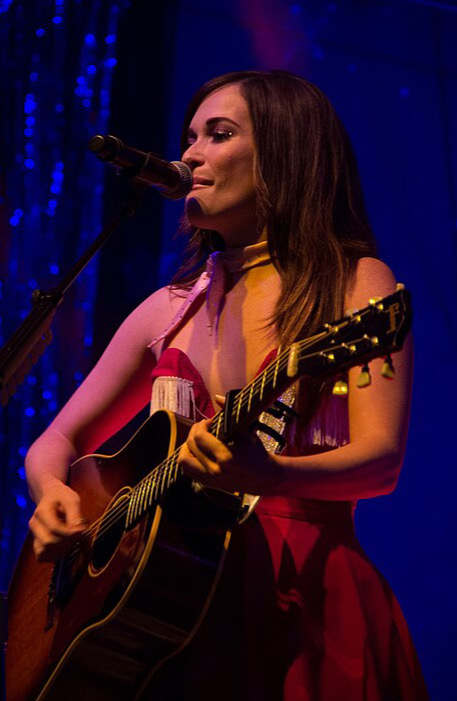
Musgraves performing at River Roots Live in August 2015

To further support the album, Musgraves embarked on the Kacey Musgraves Country & Western Rhinestone Revue concert tour. Dates on the first leg included locations across the United State and Europe; the first leg of the tour began on August 27, 2015, in Atlanta, Georgia, and concluded on November 22, 2015, in Amsterdam, Netherlands. The band Sugar & The Hi-Lows was the opening act of the tour. The second leg of the tour, which spanned portions of the US, UK and Ireland, began in Dallas, TX on January 21, 2016, and concluded in Columbia, MO, on April 30, 2016.

Reviewing the show, Kelli Skye Fadroski of Orange County Register praised Musgraves for delivering a strong performance built around selections from Same Trailer Different Park and Pageant Material, highlighting her sharp songwriting and storytelling. The setlist also included several covers, such as "Three Little Birds" by Bob Marley and "Crazy" by Gnarls Barkley.

== Commercial performance ==
Pageant Material debuted at number three on the US Billboard 200 chart with 60,000 equivalent album units, selling 55,000 copies in its first week. It marked Musgraves' best week of album sales to date. The album also reached number one on the US Top Country Albums chart and the UK Country Albums chart, while peaking at number six in Canada, number 11 in the United Kingdom, number 33 in Australia, and number 30 in Norway. As of September 2016, it had sold 179,400 copies in the US.

On the year-end charts, the album appeared at number 181 on the US Billboard 200 and number 26 on the US Top Country Albums chart in 2015, and at number 67 on the latter chart in 2016.

== Critical reception ==
Professional ratings
Aggregate scores
Source	Rating
AnyDecentMusic?	7.3/10
Metacritic	78/100
Review scores
Source	Rating
AllMusic	4/5 stars
The A.V. Club	B+
Billboard	4.5/5 stars
The Daily Telegraph	4/5 stars
The Guardian	3/5 stars
The Irish Times	4/5 stars
Nash Country Weekly	A
Pitchfork	8.0/10
Rolling Stone	3.5/5 stars
Spin	9/10

Pageant Material received positive reviews from music critics. At Metacritic, which assigns a normalized rating out of 100 to reviews from mainstream critics, the album has an average score of 78 out of 100, which indicates "generally favorable reviews" based on 25 reviews.

Critics frequently discussed Pageant Material in relation to Musgraves's previous work, noting both continuity and refinement in her artistic approach. Reviews from AllMusic and Rolling Stone described the album as closely aligned with her debut, maintaining its understated style while showing increased confidence and control, with the latter considering it stronger on a track-by-track basis. Similarly, The Daily Telegraph characterized it as a continuation of her established formula, combining traditional country elements with witty and observational songwriting, while The Irish Times noted that the album retains the attitude of her debut but adopts a more measured and restrained tone rooted in Nashville traditions. Writing for Uncut, Laura Snapes likewise viewed the album as revisiting themes from her debut but with a shifted perspective, suggesting that small-town life is portrayed less as a constraint and more as a source of resilience, although she felt it lacked some of the distinctive characters and specificity of her earlier work.

Several critics highlighted the album's songwriting and thematic focus, particularly its attention to everyday experiences and small-town life. Spin emphasized Musgraves's storytelling, suggesting it was expansive in scope, while Newsday described the record as featuring "great stories told extraordinarily well". Writing in Pitchfork, Jessica Hopper viewed the album as focused on the "work of the self", exploring themes of struggle and acceptance. Nash Country Weekly similarly noted its emphasis on expressive storytelling and unconventional subject matter within mainstream country.

Reviewers also pointed to her lyrical perspective as distinctive, with Billboard noting her balance between social commentary and more personal reflections. At the same time, others noted its crossover appeal, with The A.V. Club suggesting that its blend of country and rock elements contributed to its accessibility. While some reviewers found it cohesive and engaging—Hits Daily Double calling it "a nearly perfect set" and comparing its greatness to Adele's 21—others noted moments of inconsistency. The A.V. Club pointed to a slower pace that occasionally caused certain tracks to drag, while The Guardian who was more critical suggested the album lacked some of the sharpness and edge of her debut, favoring a smoother and more conventional approach.

Glamour's Alexandra Schwartz listed Pageant Material among the best albums of 2015, calling it "nearly flawless". Paul Grein of Hits Daily Double predicted the album would be in contention for Album of the Year at the 58th Annual Grammy Awards. Additionally, it was the Spin magazine's "album of the week", described as a "sophomore masterpiece" by its reviewer Brennan Carley.

=== Year-end lists ===
Select year-end rankings of Pageant Material
Publication	List	Rank	Ref.
American Songwriter	16	Top 50 Albums of 2015	
Americana Music Association	7	Top 100 Albums of 2015	
The Guardian	1	The 10 Best Country Albums of 2015	
Nashville Scene	4	Best Country Albums of 2015	
NPR	N/A	50 Favorite Albums of 2015	
Paste	27	The 50 Best Albums of 2015	
Rolling Stone	14	40 Best Country Albums of 2015	
Spin	8	The 50 Best Albums of 2015	
Time	6	Top 10 Best Albums of 2015	
Time Out New York	15	The 25 Best Albums of 2015	

== Accolades ==
Pageant Material was nominated for Best Country Album at the 58th Annual Grammy Awards, as well as Album of the Year at the Country Music Association Awards. Both marked Musgraves' second consecutive nominations in the respective categories.

Awards and nominations for Pageant Material
Year	Organization	Award	Result
2015	CMA Awards	Album of the Year	Nominated
2016	Grammy Awards	Best Country Album	Nominated
2016	UK Americana Awards	International Album of the Year	Nominated

== Track listing ==
All tracks were produced by Luke Laird, Shane McAnally, and Kacey Musgraves.

Standard edition
No.	Title	Writer(s)	Length
1.	"High Time"	Musgraves; Laird; McAnally	2:57
2.	"Dime Store Cowgirl"	Musgraves; Laird; McAnally	3:35
3.	"Late to the Party"	Musgraves; Brandy Clark; Josh Osborne	3:38
4.	"Pageant Material"	Musgraves; Laird; McAnally	3:56
5.	"This Town"	Musgraves; Laird; Clark	2:57
6.	"Biscuits"	Musgraves; McAnally; Clark	3:18
7.	"Somebody to Love"	Musgraves; McAnally; Osborne	3:15
8.	"Miserable"	Musgraves; Osborne; Clark	3:00
9.	"Die Fun"	Musgraves; Laird; McAnally	3:29
10.	"Family Is Family"	Musgraves; McAnally; Osborne	2:34
11.	"Good Ol' Boys Club"	Musgraves; Laird; Natalie Hemby	3:18
12.	"Cup of Tea"	Musgraves; McAnally; Osborne	2:42
13.	"Fine"	Musgraves; Ashley Arrison; McAnally	3:55
14.	"Are You Sure" (featuring Willie Nelson) (hidden track)	Nelson; Buddy Emmons	3:56
Total length:			46:23

=== Notes ===
- "Are You Sure" is a part of track 13 on CD pressings of the album (giving track 13 a length of 7:50), but a separate track on all other digital platforms. On all versions of the album, "Fine" ends at 3:37 and is followed by 18 seconds of silence.

== Personnel ==
Credits were adapted from AllMusic and liner notes.

=== Musicians ===
- David Angell – violin
- Monisa Angell – viola
- Misa Arriaga – acoustic guitar, baritone guitar, gut string guitar, shaker, background vocals
- Zeneba Bowers – violin
- Zach Casebolt – violin
- David Davidson – violin
- Fred Eltringham – bells, drums, percussion, shaker, tambourine, biscuit pan
- Ian Fitchuk – bells, Hammond B3, harp, Mellotron, piano, Wurlitzer electric piano
- Paul Franklin – pedal steel guitar
- Natalie Hemby – background vocals
- Adam Keafer – bass, upright bass
- Anthony La Marchina – cello
- Luke Laird – acoustic guitar, electric guitar, gut string guitar, tambourine, background vocals
- Shane McAnally – background vocals
- Kacey Musgraves – acoustic guitar, vocals, whistling
- Willie Nelson – background vocals, "Trigger"
- Josh Osborne – acoustic guitar, vocals
- Kyle Ryan – banjo, electric guitar, vocals, spoon
- Lindsay Smith-Trostle – cello
- Wei Tsun Chang – violin
- Katelyn Westergard – violin
- Kristin Wilkinson – viola
- Karen Winkelmann – violin
- Charlie Worsham – banjo, acoustic guitar, guitalele
- Misa Arriaga – gang vocals on "Biscuits"
- Luke Laird – gang vocals on "Biscuits"
- Shane McAnally – gang vocals on "Biscuits"
- Kyle Ryan – gang vocals on "Biscuits"

=== Technical ===
- Ryan Gore – engineer, mixing
- Kelsey Granda – production coordination
- Gena Johnson – assistant engineer
- Luke Laird – producer, programming
- Jordan Lehning – conductor, string arrangements
- Shane McAnally – producer
- Andrew Mendelson – mastering
- Kacey Musgraves – producer
- Karen Naff – design
- Jarod Snowden – editing
- Kelly Christine Sutton – art direction, design, photography
- Stephanie Wright – A&R

== Charts ==
=== Weekly charts ===
Weekly chart performance
Chart (2015)	Peak position
Australian Albums (ARIA)	33
Canadian Albums (Billboard)	6
Norwegian Albums (VG-lista)	30
UK Albums (Official Charts)	11
UK Americana Albums (Official Charts)	13
UK Country Albums (Official Charts)	1
US Billboard 200	3
US Top Country Albums (Billboard)	1

=== Year-end charts ===
Year-end chart performance
Chart (2015)	Position
US Billboard 200	181
US Top Country Albums (Billboard)	26
Chart (2016)	Position
US Top Country Albums (Billboard)	67

== Certifications ==
List of certifications and sales
Region	Certification	Certified units/sales
United Kingdom (BPI)	Silver	60,000^{‡}
^{‡} Sales+streaming figures based on certification alone.

== Release history ==
List of release histories
Region	Date	Format(s)	Version	Label	Ref.
Various	June 23, 2015	CD; digital download; vinyl	Standard	Mercury Nashville	
Various	October 10, 2025	Vinyl	10th anniversary	Mercury Nashville	
