= Angels & Devils (Sarah Darling album) =

Studio album by Sarah Darling
- Released: February 15, 2011
- Recorded: 2010
- Genre: Country
- Length: 46:24
- Label: Black River
- Producer: Jimmy Nichols; Adam Shoenfeld

Sarah Darling chronology
Every Monday Morning (2009)	Angels & Devils (2011)	Dream Country (2017)

Singles from Angels & Devils
- 1. "With or Without You" Released: August 31, 2010; 2. "Something to Do With Your Hands" Released: February 2011

Angels & Devils is the second studio album by American country music artist Sarah Darling. It was released on February 15, 2011 by Black River Entertainment as the follow-up to Darling's 2009 debut album Every Monday Morning.

The album is split into two discs. The songs on the first follow the production style of modern country music whilst the songs on the second are more traditional and acoustical, including a new 'stripped-back' recording of "Stop the Bleeding" from Darling's first album. Also featured on the record are covers of Elton John's "Sorry Seems to Be the Hardest Word" and U2's "With or Without You", the latter of which was released as a digital single on August 31, 2010.

A music video for the lead single, "Something to Do With Your Hands", was released on February 14, 2011 and features professional wrestler A.J. Styles. After its premiere on CMT.com, the video became the second most viewed music video on the site.

== Track listing ==
Disc One
No.	Title	Writer(s)	Length
1.	"Thank You"	Odie Blackmon, Sarah Darling	4:10
2.	"Something to Do With Your Hands"	Darling, Jason Deere	4:22
3.	"The Boy Never Stays"	Brandy Clark, Darling, Josh Osborne	3:39
4.	"Toxic"	Darling, Adam Shoenfeld	3:11
5.	"Bad Habit" (featuring Vince Gill)	Darling, Shane McAnally, Osborne	3:53
6.	"Angels & Devils"	Darling, Shoenfeld	4:28
7.	"With or Without You"	Bono, The Edge, Adam Clayton, Larry Mullen	4:34
Total length:			28:20

Disc Two
No.	Title	Writer(s)	Length
1.	"Stop the Bleeding" (Acoustic)	Shaunna Bolton, Darling, Joe Perreault	2:39
2.	"Sorry Seems to Be the Hardest Word"	Elton John, Bernie Taupin	4:00
3.	"Something to Do With Your Hands" (A cappella)	Darling, Deere	3:25
4.	"Waiting on You"	Bolton, Darling, Will Doughty	4:20
5.	"I Found in You"	Jonathan Cain, Darling, Jimmy Nichols	3:38
Total length:			18:04

== Personnel ==
- Tim Akers – keyboards, piano
- David Angell – violin
- Monisa Angell – viola
- Jeff Armstrong – keyboards, piano
- Carrie Bailey – violin
- Mike Brignardello – bass guitar, finger snaps
- Pat Buchanan – electric guitar, finger snaps
- Tom Bukovac – electric guitar
- Gary Burnette – acoustic guitar, finger snaps
- John Catchings – cello
- Rob Cureton – bass guitar
- Eric Darken – percussion
- Sarah Darling – lead vocals, finger snaps
- David Davidson – violin
- Steve Dorff – string arrangements
- Conni Ellisor – violin
- Chris Farrell – viola
- Shawn Fichter – drums, finger snaps
- Paul Franklin – steel guitar
- Vince Gill – duet vocals on "Bad Habit"
- Carolyn Huebl – violin
- David Hungate – bass guitar
- Tammy Rogers King – fiddle
- Anthony LaMarchina – cello
- Doug Lancio – electric guitar
- Jerry McPherson – electric guitar
- Miles McPherson – drums
- Jimmy Nichols – background vocals, keyboards, piano, finger snaps
- Mike Noble – acoustic guitar
- Mary Kathryn Van Osdale – violin
- Carole Rabinowitz – cello
- Danny Rader – acoustic guitar
- Sari Reist – cello
- Adam Shoenfeld – electric guitar, keyboards
- Pamela Sixfin – violin
- Biff Watson – acoustic guitar
- Karen Winklemann – violin
- Glenn Worf – bass guitar
- Jonathan Yudkin – cello
