= Chevel Shepherd =

American singer (born 2002)

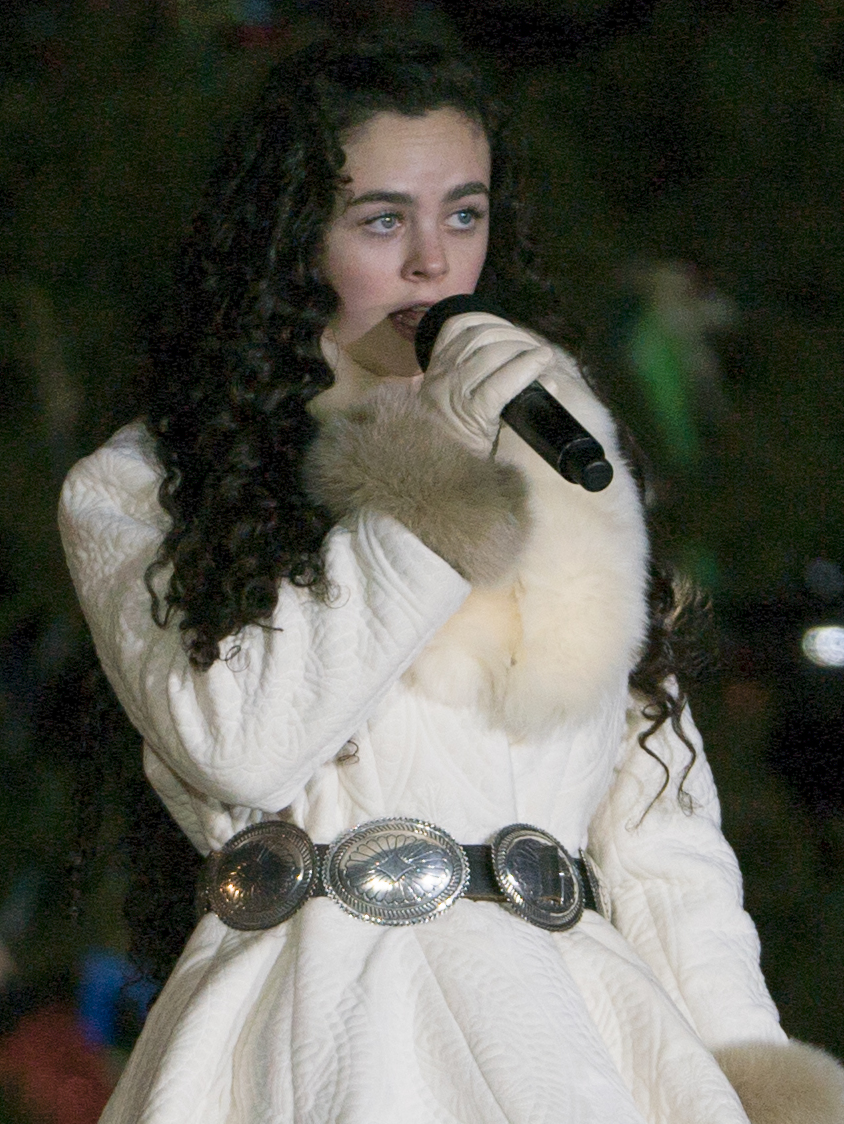
- Shepherd at the Capitol Christmas Tree Lighting in December 2019.

Background information
- Born: June 18, 2002 (age 23); Farmington, New Mexico, U.S.
- Genres: Country
- Occupation: Singer
- Years active: 2018–present

Chevel Shepherd (born June 18, 2002) is an American country singer. She is the winner of season 15 of the American talent competition The Voice at the age of 16. She was coached by Kelly Clarkson and became the first country artist to win the show that was not coached by Blake Shelton. On May 26, 2019, She performed God Bless America before the 2019 Indianapolis 500.

== Early life ==
Chevel Shepherd was born on June 18, 2002, in Farmington, New Mexico.

== Career ==
In 2018, Shepherd entered the 15th season of The Voice. In her blind audition, she sang "If I Die Young" by The Band Perry. Of the show's four coaches (Adam Levine, Kelly Clarkson, Jennifer Hudson and Blake Shelton), Clarkson, Hudson, and Shelton expressed interest in working with her, and Chevel chose to be a part of Kelly Clarkson's team. She made it to the finale and won the competition on December 18, 2018.

=== The Voice (2018) ===
==== The Voice performances ====
Stage	Song	Original artist	Order	Result
Blind Audition	"If I Die Young"	The Band Perry	3.6	Kelly Clarkson, Jennifer Hudson and Blake Shelton turned, joined Team Kelly
Battles (Top 48)	"You Look So Good in Love" (vs. Mikele Buck)	George Strait	9.6	Saved by Kelly
Knockouts (Top 32)	"Travelin' Soldier" (vs. Sarah Grace)	The Chicks	13.1	Saved by Kelly
Live Playoffs (Top 24)	"Grandpa (Tell Me 'Bout the Good Ol' Days)"	The Judds	15.11	Saved by Public
Live Top 13	"Little White Church"	Little Big Town	17.7	Saved by Public
Live Top 11	"Space Cowboy"	Kacey Musgraves	19.2	Saved by Public
Live Top 10	"You're Lookin' at Country"	Loretta Lynn	21.8	Saved by Public
Live Semifinals (Top 8)	"She's Country"/ "Country Must Be Country Wide " (duet with Kirk Jay)	Jason Aldean/Brantley Gilbert	23.2	Saved by Public
Live Semifinals (Top 8)	"Blue"	LeAnn Rimes	23.7	Saved by Public
Live Finale (Final 4)	"Rockin' with the Rhythm of the Rain" with (Kelly Clarkson)	The Judds	25.8	Winner
Live Finale (Final 4)	"Broken Hearts" (original song)	Chevel Shepherd	25.11	Winner
Live Finale (Final 4)	"It's a Little Too Late"	Tanya Tucker	25.2	Winner

== Filmography ==
Year	Title	Role	Notes
2018	The Voice	Herself / contestant	Winner (season 15)
2022	Vengeance	Young Singer	Acting debut; cameo appearance
2023	Wildfire: The Legend of the Cherokee Ghost Horse	Samantha Nichols	

== Tours ==
Opening

- Red Pill Blues Tour (2019) (opening for Maroon 5)

== Discography ==
=== Albums ===
Everybody's Got a Story (2021)

=== Singles ===
Single	Year	Peak chart positions
Single	Year	US Country
"Broken Hearts"	2018	24

== Awards and nominations ==
Year	Award	Category	Nominated work	Result
2018	Talent Recap Fan Choice Awards	Favorite Talent Show Winner	The Voice	Nominated

Awards and achievements
Preceded by Brynn Cartelli	The Voice (American); Winner; 2018 (Fall)	Succeeded by Maelyn Jarmon
Preceded by "Walk My Way"	The Voice (American); Winner's song "Broken Hearts"; 2018 (Fall)	Succeeded by "Wait For You"
