= Star-Crossed: Unveiled =

2022 concert tour by Kacey Musgraves

- Tour by Kacey Musgraves
- Promotional poster for the tour
- Associated album: Star-Crossed
- Start date: January 19, 2022
- End date: October 16, 2022
- Legs: 1
- No. of shows: 17 in North America; 7 in Europe; 2 in Asia; 24 in total
- Supporting acts: King Princess; MUNA

Kacey Musgraves concert chronology
- Oh, What a World: Tour II (2019); Star-Crossed: Unveiled (2022); Deeper Well World Tour (2024)

Star-Crossed: Unveiled was the sixth concert tour and first arena concert tour by American singer-songwriter Kacey Musgraves in support of her fifth studio album, Star-Crossed (2021). It began on January 19, 2022, in Saint Paul, Minnesota, United States, and took place across cities in the United States, Europe and Japan. It concluded in Austin, Texas, United States, on October 16, comprising 27 shows. King Princess and MUNA served as opening acts during the first leg of the tour in the United States.

== Background ==
On 30 August 2021, Kacey Musgraves formally announced Star-Crossed: Unveiled, with 15 shows across North America in January and February the following year. Tickets went on sale September 9, with an American Express presale running from September 2 until September 8. A music video for her single "justified" was released in conjunction with the tour announcement. Only the show in Toronto was cancelled due to the severe weather conditions. On 25 May 2021, The Primavera Sound Festival announced its 2022 line up. Musgraves was originally set to perform at the festival back in 2020 but the festival was cancelled due to the COVID-19 pandemic. On 4 February 2022, Musgraves was announced to headline the Hampton Court Palace Festival and on 10 May 2022 Musgraves was announced to headline the Austin City Limits Festival. On 24 June 2022, Adele announced Musgraves as her support for her two July 2022 shows in Hyde Park, London.

== Set list ==
This set list is representative of the show on January 19, 2022, in Saint Paul. It is not representative of all concerts for the duration of the tour.

1. "Star-Crossed"
2. "Good Wife"
3. "Cherry Blossom"
4. "Simple Times"
5. "Breadwinner"
6. "Golden Hour"
7. "Butterflies"
8. "Lonely Weekend"
9. "Space Cowboy"
10. "High Horse"
11. "Camera Roll"
12. "Hookup Scene"
13. "Merry Go 'Round"
14. "No Scrubs" (TLC cover)
15. "Justified"
16. "There Is A Light"
17. "Gracias a la vida" (Violeta Parra cover)
18. "Slow Burn"
19. "Rainbow"

Notes

- Starting with the show in Barcelona, "Dreams" was permanently added to the set list in place of "No Scrubs", "Hookup Scene" and "Gracias a la vida" were also permanently removed from the set list. "Cherry Blossom", "Space Cowboy", "Camera Roll" & "Merry Go 'Round" were not performed.
- Starting with the show in Molesey, a cover of Elvis Presley's Can't Help Falling In Love was added to the set list.
- Starting with the show in Pilton, "Camera Roll" & "Merry Go 'Round" were permanently removed from the set list. "Cherry Blossom", "Lonely Weekend", "Space Cowboy" & "Can't Help Falling In Love" were not performed.
- Starting with the shows in London and Werchter, "Space Cowboy" was permanently removed from the set list. "Cherry Blossom" was not performed.
- During the show in Pasadena, Willie Nelson joined Musgraves to perform On the Road Again in place of "Can't Help Falling In Love". "Cherry Blossom" was not performed.
- During the show in Chiba, "Can't Help Falling In Love" & "Dreams" were not performed.
- During the show in Osaka, "Can't Help Falling In Love" was not performed.

The following covers were performed by Musgraves in place of "No Scrubs":

- During the shows in Chicago, Cleveland, Boston, Washington, D.C., Atlanta, Dallas, Oakland, "Dreams".
- During the show in Kansas City, "Killing Me Softly with His Song".
- During the shows in Philadelphia, New York City, Nashville, Los Angeles and Pasadena, "9 to 5".

== Shows ==
List of concerts, showing date, city, country, venue, opening acts, tickets sold, number of available tickets and amount of gross revenue
Date	City	Country	Venue	Opening acts	Attendance	Revenue
North America
January 19, 2022	Saint Paul	United States	Xcel Energy Center	King Princess; MUNA	—	$692,000
January 20, 2022	Chicago	United States	United Center	King Princess; MUNA	12,083 / 12,083	$1,301,656
January 21, 2022	Kansas City	United States	T-Mobile Center	King Princess; MUNA	—	—
January 23, 2022	Cleveland	United States	Rocket Mortgage FieldHouse	King Princess; MUNA	—	—
January 26, 2022	Philadelphia	United States	Wells Fargo Center	King Princess; MUNA	6,672 / 10,872	$560,703
January 27, 2022	Boston	United States	TD Garden	King Princess; MUNA	11,486 / 11,486	$1,120,462
February 3, 2022	Washington D.C.	United States	Capital One Arena	King Princess; MUNA	12,890 / 15,285	$1,280,951
February 5, 2022	New York City	United States	Madison Square Garden	King Princess; MUNA	14,370 / 14,370	$1,703,117
February 9, 2022	Atlanta	United States	State Farm Arena	King Princess; MUNA	—	—
February 11, 2022	Nashville	United States	Bridgestone Arena	King Princess; MUNA	13,497 / 13,497	$1,629,006
February 14, 2022	Dallas	United States	American Airlines Center	King Princess; MUNA	13,404 / 13,404	$1,790,958
February 16, 2022	Denver	United States	Ball Arena	King Princess; MUNA	—	—
February 19, 2022	Oakland	United States	Oakland Arena	King Princess; MUNA	11,568 / 12,558	$1,094,096
February 20, 2022	Los Angeles	United States	Crypto.com Arena	King Princess; MUNA	18,000 / 18,000	—
Europe
June 2, 2022	Barcelona	Spain	Parc del Fòrum (Note: This concert is part of the Primavera Sound Festival)	—N/a	—N/a	—N/a
June 22, 2022	Molesey	United Kingdom	Hampton Court Palace (Note: This concert is part of the Hampton Court Palace Festival)	—N/a	—N/a	—N/a
June 26, 2022	Pilton	United Kingdom	Worthy Farm (Note: This concert is part of the Glastonbury Festival)	—N/a	—N/a	—N/a
June 30, 2022	Roskilde	Denmark	Roskilde Festival (Note: This concert is part of the Roskilde Festival)	—N/a	—N/a	—N/a
July 1, 2022	London	United Kingdom	Hyde Park (Note: This concert is part of Adele's 2022 Hyde Park Shows)	Opening for Adele	—N/a	—N/a
July 2, 2022	London	United Kingdom	Hyde Park	Opening for Adele	—N/a	—N/a
July 3, 2022	Werchter	Belgium	Rock Werchter (Note: This concert is part of Rock Werchter)	—N/a	—N/a	—N/a
North America
July 9, 2022	Pasadena	United States	Brookside at the Rose Bowl Stadium (Note: This concert is part of the Palomino Festival)	—N/a	—N/a	—N/a
Asia
August 20, 2022	Chiba	Japan	Makuhari Messe (Note: This concert is part of the Summer Sonic Festival)	—N/a	—N/a	—N/a
August 21, 2022	Osaka	Japan	Maishima Sports Island (Note: This concert is part of the Summer Sonic Festival)	—N/a	—N/a	—N/a
North America
October 9, 2022	Austin	United States	Zilker Metropolitan Park (Note: This concert is part of the Austin City Limits Festival)	—N/a	—N/a	—N/a
October 16, 2022	Austin	United States	Zilker Metropolitan Park	—N/a	—N/a	—N/a
Total					167,000	$17,800,000

=== Cancelled shows ===
List of cancelled concerts
Date	City	Country	Venue	Reason	Ref.
25 February 2022	Toronto (Note: This concert was originally scheduled for January 24, 2022 but was rescheduled due to COVID-19 but was ultimately cancelled)	Canada	Scotiabank Arena	Severe Weather	
19 June 2022	Landgraaf	Netherlands	Pinkpop Festival	Unknown Reason	
24 June 2022	Paris	France	L'Olympia	Supply chain issues	
22 July 2022	Yelgun	Australia	Splendour in the Grass	Severe Weather	

== Personnel ==
- Kacey Musgraves - lead vocals, acoustic guitar, banjo, mandolin and harmonica
- Rob Humphreys - drums
- Tarron Crayton - bass
- John Whitt - keyboards and MD
- Darek Cobbs - keyboards
- Drew Taubenfeld - guitar, pedal steel and MD
- Benjamin Jaffe - guitar, flute and vox
- Jon Sosin - guitar, banjo and vox
