= Oh, What a World: Tour II =

2019 concert tour by Kacey Musgraves

- Tour by Kacey Musgraves
- Location: North America
- Associated albums: Golden Hour
- Start date: August 20, 2019
- End date: October 25, 2019
- Legs: 1
- No. of shows: 28
- Supporting acts: Maggie Rogers; Poolside; Yola; Weyes Blood; Lucius

Kacey Musgraves concert chronology
- Oh, What a World: Tour (2018-2019); Oh, What a World: Tour II (2019); Star-Crossed: Unveiled (2022)

Oh, What a World: Tour II was the fifth concert tour and second instalment of the "Oh, What a World: Tour" by American singer-songwriter Kacey Musgraves in support of her fourth studio album, Golden Hour (2018). It began on August 20, 2019, in Las Vegas, and travelled all across North America. It ended in Nashville on October 25, 2019, comprising 30 shows. Poolside, Yola, Weyes Blood and Lucius served as opening acts during the tour, while Maggie Rogers served as a one night only support for the tour ending their tours together in the same venue.

== Set list ==
This set list is representative of the show on August 20, 2019, in Las Vegas. It is not representative of all concerts for the duration of the tour.

1. "Slow Burn"
2. "Wonder Woman"
3. "Butterflies"
4. "Lonely Weekend"
5. "Happy & Sad"
6. "Merry Go 'Round"
7. "High Time"
8. "Golden Hour"
9. "Mother"
10. "Oh, What a World"
11. "Family Is Family"
12. "Love Is a Wild Thing"
13. "Velvet Elvis"
14. "I Will Survive" (Gloria Gaynor cover)
15. "Space Cowboy"
16. "Follow Your Arrow"
17. "Rainbow"
18. "High Horse"

Notes

- Starting with the first show in Los Angeles, a cover of Brooks & Dunn's "Neon Moon" was added to the set list.
- During the shows in Boston, Charlottesville, the first show in Irving, New York City & Nashville, "Neon Moon" was not played.
- Starting with the show in Cary, "I Will Survive" was replaced with a Whitney Houston cover of "I Wanna Dance With Somebody (Who Loves Me)".
- During the shows in Asheville, "I Will Survive" was played in place of "I Wanna Dance With Somebody", "Neon Moon" was not played.
- During the shows in New Orleans, Yola joined Musgraves on stage to perform "I Will Survive". "I Wanna Dance With Somebody" was not played.
- During the show in Nashville, Maggie Rogers joined Musgraves on stage to perform "I Wanna Dance With Somebody". Harry Styles joined Musgraves on stage to perform "Space Cowboy".

== Shows ==
List of concerts, showing date, city, country, venues and opening acts
Date	City	Country	Venue	Opening acts
North America
August 20, 2019	Las Vegas	United States	Cosmopolitan of Las Vegas	Poolside
August 22, 2019	San Diego	United States	California Coast Credit Union	Poolside
August 23, 2019	Los Angeles	United States	Greek Theatre	Poolside
August 24, 2019	Paso Robles	United States	Vina Robles Amphitheatre	Poolside
August 25, 2019	Los Angeles	United States	Greek Theatre	Poolside
August 27, 2019	Phoenix	United States	Arizona Federal Theatre	Poolside
August 28, 2019	Santa Fe	United States	Santa Fe Opera	Yola
September 4, 2019	Kansas City	United States	Starlight Theatre	Yola
September 5, 2019	Saint Louis	United States	Stifel Theatre	Yola
September 6, 2019	Cleveland	United States	Jacobs Pavilion	Yola
September 7, 2019	Vienna	United States	Wolf Trap National Park for the Performing Arts	Yola
September 9, 2019	Toronto	Canada	Meridian Hall	Yola
September 11, 2019	Philadelphia	United States	Metropolitan Opera House	Weyes Blood
September 12, 2019	Boston	United States	Leader Bank Pavilion	Weyes Blood
September 13, 2019	Charlottesville	United States	Downtown Mall	Weyes Blood
September 14, 2019	Cary	United States	Koka Booth Amphitheatre	Weyes Blood
September 16, 2019	Asheville	United States	Harrah's Cherokee Center	Weyes Blood
September 17, 2019	Asheville	United States	Harrah's Cherokee Center	Weyes Blood
September 19, 2019	Charlotte	United States	AvidxChange Music Factory	Weyes Blood
September 20, 2019	Charleston	United States	Credit One Stadium	Weyes Blood
September 21, 2019	Saint Augustine	United States	St. Augustine Amphitheatre (Note: This concert was part of the Sing Out Loud Festival)	—N/a
September 27, 2019	New Orleans	United States	The Fillmore	Yola
September 28, 2019	New Orleans	United States	The Fillmore	Yola
October 10, 2019	Irving	United States	The Pavilion at Toyota Music Factory	Lucius
October 11, 2019	Irving	United States	The Pavilion at Toyota Music Factory	Lucius
October 15, 2019	New York City	United States	Radio City Music Hall	Lucius
October 16, 2019	New York City	United States	Radio City Music Hall	Lucius
October 25, 2019	Nashville	United States	Bridgestone Arena	Maggie Rogers; Yola

=== Cancelled shows ===
List of cancelled concerts
Date	City	Country	Venue	Reason	Ref.
21 March 2020	Mexico City (Note: This concert was originally scheduled for December 10, 2019 but was rescheduled due to Regulatory compliance but was ultimately cancelled)	Mexico	El Plaza Condesa	COVID-19 pandemic	

== Personnel ==
- Kacey Musgraves - lead vocals, acoustic guitar, banjo, mandolin and harmonica
- Scott Quintana - drums, percussion and spoons
- Adam Keafer - bass
- Kai Welch - guitar, keyboards, & background vocals
- Nathaniel Smith - cello, keyboards & background vocals
- Kyle Ryan - guitar, banjo, vocals & musical director
- Smokin' Brett Resnick - pedal steel guitar
