= The Kacey Musgraves Christmas Show (album) =

Soundtrack album by Kacey Musgraves
- Released: November 28, 2019
- Length: 40:22
- Label: MCA Nashville
- Producers: Ben Winston; Emma Conway; Fulwell 73 Productions; Jason Owen; Kacey Musgraves; Kyle Ryan

Kacey Musgraves chronology
| Golden Hour (2018) | The Kacey Musgraves Christmas Show (2019) | Star-Crossed (2021) |

The Kacey Musgraves Christmas Show is a soundtrack album by American country singer Kacey Musgraves, released on November 28, 2019 by MCA Nashville. The album accompanies the Prime Video special of the same name, and is Musgraves' second Christmas album, following 2016's A Very Kacey Christmas.

== Reception ==
Professional ratings
Review scores
| Source | Rating |
|---|---|
| AllMusic | 2.5/5 stars |
| American Songwriter | 4/5 stars |

Stephen Thomas Erlewine of AllMusic said that the album "builds upon the retro charms of A Very Kacey Christmas, replicating its affectionately tongue-in-cheek blend of old-fashioned show biz corn and seasonal warmth". "Glittery" was praised as a highlight, with Ellen Johnson of Paste calling it "a new romantic holiday staple à la Ella Fitzgerald’s recording of "I've Got My Love To Keep Me Warm," or a much less problematic version of "Baby It's Cold Outside."

== Track listing ==
All songs produced by Ben Winston, Emma Conway, Fulwell 73 Productions, Jason Owen, Kacey Musgraves, and Kyle Ryan.

| No. | Title | Writer(s) | Length |
|---|---|---|---|
| 1. | "Let It Snow" (featuring James Corden) | Jule Styne; Sammy Cahn | 3:53 |
| 2. | "Countdown" (Interlude) | Werner Tautz | 0:29 |
| 3. | "Have Yourself a Merry Little Christmas" | Hugh Martin; Ralph Blane | 2:41 |
| 4. | "Getting Ready" (Interlude) | Todd Carlon | 1:45 |
| 5. | "Present Without a Bow" (featuring Leon Bridges) | Austin Jenkins; Kacey Musgraves; Leon Bridges; Luke Laird | 3:40 |
| 6. | "Making a List" (Interlude) | Heinz Kitschenberg | 0:49 |
| 7. | "Rockin' Around the Christmas Tree" (featuring Camila Cabello) | Johnny Marks | 2:04 |
| 8. | "(Not So) Silent Night" (featuring Fred Armisen) | Franz Xaver Gruber; Joseph Mohr | 5:05 |
| 9. | "Christmas Makes Me Cry" | Brandy Clark; Musgraves; Shane McAnally | 3:03 |
| 10. | "Amp It Up, Dan" (Interlude) | Kyle Ryan | 1:16 |
| 11. | "Christmas Fail" (Interlude) | | 0:39 |
| 12. | "Mele Kalikimaka" (featuring Zooey Deschanel) | R. Alex Anderson | 3:04 |
| 13. | "Cookies" (Interlude) | Tautz | 0:53 |
| 14. | "Glittery" (featuring Troye Sivan) | Daniel Tashian; Musgraves | 2:23 |
| 15. | "I'll Be Home Intro" (Interlude) | Ryan | 0:36 |
| 16. | "I'll Be Home for Christmas" (with Lana Del Rey) | Kim Gannon; Walter Kent | 2:12 |
| 17. | "NANA!" (Interlude) | Henrik Wikström; Steve Martin | 2:05 |
| 18. | "Ribbons and Bows" | Julia Michaels; Justin Tranter; Musgraves | 3:45 |
| Total length: | | | 40:22 |

== Personnel ==
Credits adapted from Tidal

=== Vocals ===
- Kacey Musgraves – lead vocals, spoken word vocals
- Lana Del Rey — lead vocals
- Fred Armisen — featured vocals
- Leon Bridges — featured vocals
- Camila Cabello — featured vocals
- James Corden — featured vocals
- Zooey Deschanel — featured vocals
- Troye Sivan — featured vocals
- The Crispy Boys — spoken word vocals, background vocals
- Gena Johnson — background vocals
- Dan Levy — spoken word vocals
- Barbara Musgraves — spoken word vocals
- Joe Pisapia — background vocals
- Kyle Ryan — background vocals
- William D. Sanford — spoken word vocals
- Jesse Shapiro — spoken word vocals
- Louis Waymouth — spoken word vocals

=== Musicians ===
- Crystal Brooke Alforque — violin
- Emily Cohavi — violin
- Matt Endahl — piano
- John Estes — upright bass
- Adam Keafer — vocal bass
- Timothy McKay — baritone saxophone
- Scott Quintana — drums, bells, conga, percussion, triangle
- Brett Resnick — pedal steel
- Kyle Ryan — acoustic guitar, electric guitar, nylon-string guitar, ukulele, piano, toy piano, bells, glockenspiel, mellotron, tambourine, vibraphone
- Nat Smith — cello, mellotron, celesta, tenor guitar
- Kristin Weber — violin
- Kai Welch — trumpet, piano, Wurlitzer electric piano, mellotron, moog bass, organ
- Leah Zeger — violin

=== Technical ===
- Mike Abbott — recording engineer
- David Ives — mastering engineer
- Gena Johnson — recording engineer, mixing
- Rachael Moore — assistant recording engineer
- Kyle Ryan — recording engineer, mixing
- Darrell Thorp — mixing

== Charts ==
=== Weekly charts ===
| Chart (2019–2020) | Peak position |
|---|---|
| US Billboard 200 | 120 |
| US Top Country Albums (Billboard) | 20 |
| US Top Holiday Albums (Billboard) | 9 |
| US Soundtrack Albums (Billboard) | 9 |

=== Year-end charts ===
| Chart (2020) | Position |
|---|---|
| US Top Country Albums (Billboard) | 92 |

== Release history ==
| Region | Date | Format(s) | Label | Ref. |
|---|---|---|---|---|
| Various | November 28, 2019 | Digital download; streaming | MCA Nashville | |
| Various | September 17, 2020 | CD; LP | MCA Nashville | |
