= Star-Crossed (album) =

- Standard cover

Studio album by Kacey Musgraves
- Released: September 10, 2021
- Recorded: 2019–2021
- Studio: Watershed (Nashville)
- Genres: Pop; country pop
- Length: 47:32
- Languages: English; Spanish
- Labels: MCA Nashville; Interscope
- Producers: Ian Fitchuk; Daniel Tashian; Kacey Musgraves

Kacey Musgraves chronology
The Kacey Musgraves Christmas Show (2019)	Star-Crossed (2021)	Deeper Well (2024)

Singles from Star-Crossed
- 1. "Justified" Released: August 27, 2021; 2. "Camera Roll" Released: January 24, 2022

Star-Crossed (stylized in all lowercase) is the fifth studio album by American singer Kacey Musgraves. It was released on September 10, 2021, by MCA Nashville and Interscope Records. Musgraves co-wrote and co-produced the album with American musicians Ian Fitchuk and Daniel Tashian, with whom she also collaborated on her fourth studio album, Golden Hour (2018).

The album's subject matter was inspired by Musgraves' personal journey of heartache and healing following her divorce from American singer-songwriter Ruston Kelly. She described Star-Crossed as chronicling a "modern tragedy", taking influences from Romeo and Juliet, the famous play by English playwright William Shakespeare, and cited Bill Withers, Daft Punk, Sade, Eagles, and Weezer as her musical references for the album. In contrast to her earlier albums, Star-Crossed is primarily a pop record, infusing elements of folk, dance, rock, and psychedelic music while retaining some of the country poise of its predecessor. It consists of mellow ballads, propelled by steady tempos, analog synthesizers, looped drums, and layered harmonies.

The album was preceded by the promotional single "Star-Crossed" on August 23, 2021, followed by "Justified" as the lead single a few days later. "Camera Roll" was released to adult alternative radio as the album's second single on January 24, 2022. A companion film titled after the album and featuring its music, directed by Bardia Zeinali, was exclusively released to Paramount+ alongside the album's release.

Star-Crossed received generally favorable reviews from music critics, who regarded it as the "divorce album" of Musgraves' discography, in contrast to the celebration of marriage on Golden Hour. Most of the reviews complimented its genre-blending production and Musgraves' intimate storytelling, while the rest viewed Musgraves' pivot towards pop as uninspired and felt it was an inferior work to Golden Hour. Star-Crossed placed on many year-end lists of the best albums of 2021. Commercially, the album arrived inside the top 10 in Australia, Canada, Scotland, the United Kingdom, and the United States; and topped the country genre charts in Australia, the UK and the US. One of the album's tracks, "Camera Roll", was nominated for Best Country Solo Performance and Best Country Song at the 64th Annual Grammy Awards.

== Background and recording ==
In March 2018, American singer-songwriter Kacey Musgraves released her fourth studio album, Golden Hour, which received widespread critical acclaim and won in all four of its nominated categories at the 61st Grammy Awards, including Album of the Year and Best Country Album. It debuted at number four on the US Billboard 200 chart and at number one on the Top Country Albums chart. To support the album, Musgraves embarked on two concert tours: the Oh, What a World: Tour and the Oh, What a World: Tour II.

In March 2021, Musgraves was featured on the cover of Rolling Stone magazine. In the cover story, she delves into self-care and the personal work she has done during the COVID-19 pandemic. Musgraves also revealed that as of January 2021, she had written 39 songs for the project, and she's once again working with Golden Hour co-producers Ian Fitchuk and Daniel Tashian.

In April 2021, it was reported that the album would be released via Interscope Records and UMG Nashville. In May, during a cover story for Elle magazine, Musgraves revealed that the album sees her tackling her divorce from country singer Ruston Kelly after two and a half years of marriage. The two were married in October 2017, and filed for divorce in July 2020. Musgraves also revealed that the record contains 15 of the now 40 songs she wrote during the pandemic.

In August 2021, during a cover story for Crack Magazine, it was revealed that the project would be released before the end of the year, feature jazz flute and a kato, and have "more of a foot in country than Golden Hour". During an appearance on Dr. Maya Shankar's podcast A Slight Change of Plans, Musgraves sang snippets of two of the songs from the album, "Camera Roll" and "Angel". On August 21, to celebrate her birthday, Kacey shared a snippet of the title track, which was released as the lead single two days later. The album was recorded in Nashville in early 2021, in under three weeks. In an interview with Zane Lowe on Apple Music, Musgraves elaborated on what to expect sonically from the album, noting that although the album would be more country than Golden Hour, it would be combined with more musical influences.

== Influences ==
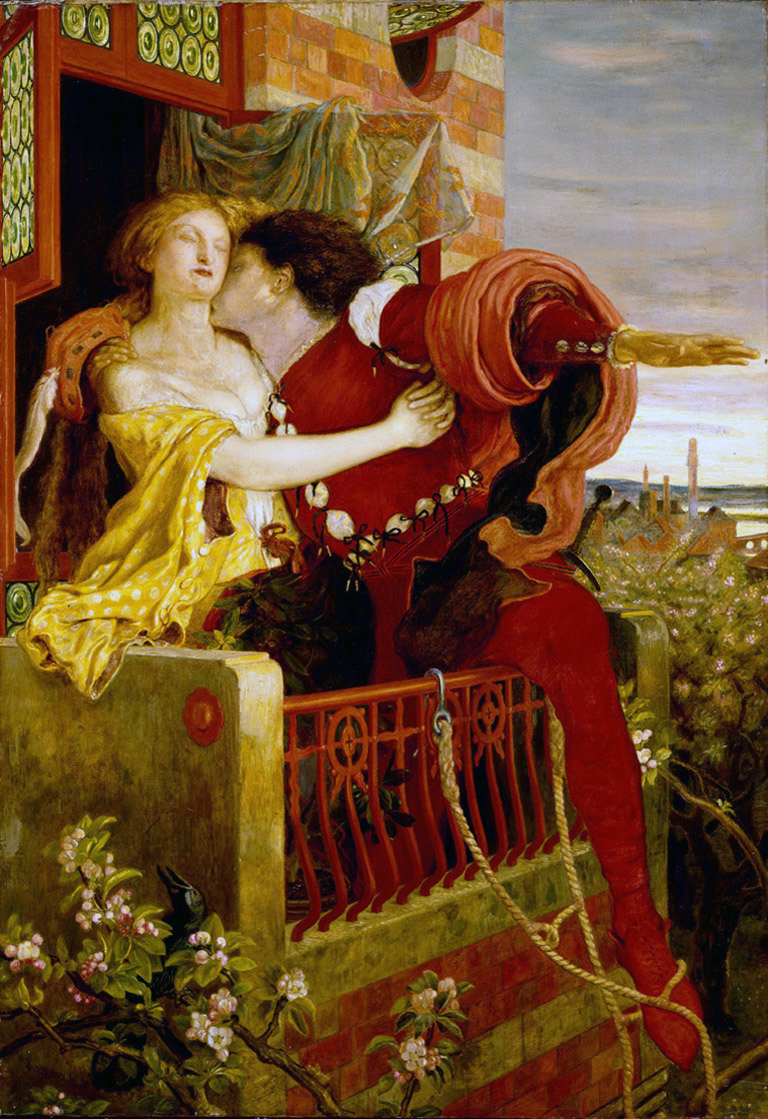
Musgraves called the album a "modern tragedy", drawing inspiration from Romeo and Juliet.

Musgraves cited Bill Withers, Daft Punk, Sade, Eagles, and Weezer as inspirations for the album. Regarding her status as country musician, she said "I feel like I don't belong to country in any way on one hand, but on the other hand, I'm deeply rooted in that genre. So I'm not owned by it." The album's lyrics were conceived by Musgraves following her divorce from Kelly. In the Rolling Stone interview, the singer explained that as she was conceptualizing the album earlier this year, she kept coming back to Greek tragedies, and their three-act structure. The album is also inspired by William Shakespeare's popular tragedy Romeo and Juliet.

== Music and lyrics ==
Star-Crossed is a pop and country pop album with folk, dance, disco, soft rock, alternative rock, and R&B elements. It is characterized by ballads, layered with harmonies, analog synths, and drum loops. Slate critic Carl Wilson said the album expands on the "mellow psychedelic-country-synth sound" Musgraves discovered on Golden Hour with co-producers Ian Fitchuk and Daniel Tashian. The country music committee of the Recording Academy ruled Star-Crossed and its singles ineligible for the country categories at the 64th Annual Grammy Awards, saying they are "not sufficiently country"; Variety said Musgraves' submissions would presumably move "over to pop categories."

The album's subject matter discusses themes of marriage, divorce, and post-breakup emotional healing, whereas its track-list is divided into three sections, which Musgraves dubbed as "three acts". Variety's Chris Willman differentiated Star-Crossed as her "divorce album" while Golden Hour was her "honeymoon record".

I think it's interesting that we're all taught that the success of a relationship has to somehow correlate with the length of it – in that it could be a friendship, a business relationship, a marriage or whatever. I just don't think that that's fully accurate. You can easily say [Star-Crossed] is a post-divorce album, which yes, it is factually on paper. But this album is full of a lot of love and gratitude for that person, for Ruston, for my life and my ability to explore all the emotions as a songwriter.

— Musgraves on the album's theme, NPR

=== Songs ===
"Star-Crossed" is a psychedelic and country song, driven by a Spanish guitar and heartbeat-like percussion, about Musgrave's personal journey. The song opens with a bed of harmonized "ooh" vocals, before the singer sings, "Let me set the scene." What follows is the recounting of a divorce, with papers signed, possessions divided, and names changed. Musgraves described the title track as "a pared back, Latin-inflected ballad about resigning from a relationship and accepting fate without bitterness", noting that it "swells into a pattern of guttural electric guitar, spectral strings and a chorus of voices". The track is inspired by the history of Romeo and Juliet.

== Promotion and release ==
On August 23, 2021, Musgraves announced that her fifth album will be called Star-Crossed and revealed the release date. On the same day, she revealed the track list across her social media. Star-Crossed was released on September 10, 2021. On October 2, Musgraves appeared on Saturday Night Live and performed "Camera Roll" and "Justified," the latter wearing only a guitar and cowboy boots.

=== Film ===
On August 23, 2021, Musgraves posted a trailer across her social media for a 50-minute companion film, titled after the album. The film was launched exclusively on Paramount+ the same day the album was released, September 10, 2021. The film, characterized as having "a sense of heightened reality", was directed by Bardia Zeinali from a concept by Musgraves and Zeinali, and shot by cinematographer Matthew Libatique. The film was shot over 10 days in Los Angeles and features cameo appearances by actors Eugene Levy, Victoria Pedretti, and Diane Venora, RuPaul's Drag Race winner Symone, rapper Princess Nokia, and comedian Meg Stalter.

=== Tour ===
The album was supported by the Star-Crossed: Unveiled tour, Musgraves' seventh headlining concert tour and first arena tour. It began on January 19, 2022, in St. Paul, Minnesota and was intended to be concluded in Toronto, Canada on February 25. However, the Toronto concert was cancelled a few hours before the performance. This tour comprised 14 shows. King Princess and MUNA served as opening acts.

== Critical reception ==
Professional ratings
Aggregate scores
Source	Rating
AnyDecentMusic?	7.6/10
Metacritic	78/100
Review scores
Source	Rating
AllMusic	3.5/5 stars
The A.V. Club	B+
Entertainment Weekly	B+
The Guardian	3/5 stars
The Independent	3/5 stars
NME	4/5 stars
Pitchfork	7.7/10
Rolling Stone	3.5/5 stars
Slant	4/5 stars
Under the Radar	4.5/10

Upon release, Star-Crossed received generally positive reviews from music critics. On Metacritic, which assigns a normalized score out of 100 to ratings from publications, the album received a weighted mean score of 78 based on 23 critics, indicating "generally favorable reviews".

Lauren Dehollogne, reviewing for The Line of Best Fit, lauded Star-Crossed as Musgraves' "most raw and honest album to-date" and hailed her as one of the best songwriters of her generation. He called the album a "near therapeutic experience", accentuated by its honeyed vocal performances and minimalistic "dreamy" melodies. Writing for NME, Hannah Mylrea called Star-Crossed an intricate, "powerfully honest depiction of heartbreak" with sonically diverse songs and "brutally honest" lyrics, finding Musgraves address uncomfortable emotions. Entertainment Weekly critic Leah Greenblatt stated Star-Crossed comprises themes covering both "the essence of country music (love hurts, life is hard) and an extremely 2021 refraction of it." Slant reviewer Jeremy Winograd described the album as an intimate, eclectic, "effortlessly melodic and accessible" album far from country or pop radio tropes. Winograd stated even some of the album's less stripped-down tracks are arranged in a very simple fashion, emphasizing Musgraves' stylistic vision and eschewing formulaic pop.

DIY's Ben Tipple observed, much like its predecessor, Star-Crossed "takes the storytelling of her country roots and presents it with pop grandeur", but this time with a darker tone. Tipple complimented the blend of both retrospective and contemporary pop production in the album, while also making space for Musgraves' "personal storytelling". Gabrielle Sanchez of The A.V. Club said the album is her "least country" effort, leaning into the modern pop and disco influences that she began to incorporate in her music with Golden Hour. Writing for Exclaim!, Dylan Barnabe highlighted that the album is an emotionally vulnerable, "ballad-heavy" record, divided into sections explaining the "exposition, climax, downfall, and resolution of Musgraves' love story". David Smyth of Evening Standard recognized adulthood's aspirations and its harsh realities as the album's overarching motifs, and its sound "a less dramatic progression than that between Golden Hour and its more traditional predecessors."

Other reviews were critical of the album. Pitchfork critic Sam Sodomsky found Musgraves "burrowing inward" in Star-Crossed, singing stark, simplistic lyrics, but amplifying her "obsessive self-reflection" for mainstream appeal. Sodomsky underscored the album's dichotomy between vulnerability and triumph, and regarded its best moments as "artful" while the rest "feel forced." Paste writer Ellen Johnson said, while Star-Crossed "can't quite touch the otherworldly iridescence" of Golden Hour, it is "still a hell of a listen." Johnson commended the production by the Tashian/Fitchuk duo and Musgraves storytelling skills, but picked "Angel", "Easier Said", and "Keep Lookin' Up" as mid-tier tracks. In his AllMusic review, senior editor Stephen Thomas Erlewine wrote Star-Crossed offers "a full-blown song cycle" detailing the breakdown of Musgraves' marriage. He dubbed it a "quintessential divorce record" and admired its soothing production, but felt the lyrics suffer from "blunt literalism".

The Guardian's Laura Snapes appreciated the album's acoustic, ambiguous songwriting, and "cosmic, retro-futurist" production, which she identified as stemming from Golden Hour. However, she felt some melodies, production elements, and "zoomed-out" lyrics are indistinct, inspired by "turn-of-the-millennium white pop." Reviewing for Rolling Stone, Jonathan Bernstein dubbed it a "consistently compelling, admirably idiosyncratic yet mildly disappointing" album, whose best moments were when Musgraves "put her own personalized spin on the well-worn cliches of the standard big-budget post-break-up purge-fest." In mixed reviews, Helen Brown from The Independent opined the album is not Musgraves' "sharpest" work, delivering platitudes with subpar melodies, nevertheless, appreciated the honesty and relatability of her lyrics, while Mark Moody of Under the Radar considered it an inferior record to Golden Hour, criticizing the "cringe-worthy lyrics" of Star-Crossed and its "failed efforts" in transitioning to pop and dance genres.

=== Accolades ===
==== Year-end lists ====
Critics' rankings for Star-Crossed
Publication	Accolade	Rank	Ref.
Billboard	The 50 Best Albums of 2021	13	
Complex	The Best Albums of 2021	22	
Flood Magazine	The Best Albums of 2021	10	
The Guardian	The 50 Best Albums of 2021	28	
The Line of Best Fit	The Best Albums of 2021	45	
NME	The 50 Best Albums of 2021	48	
PopMatters	The 75 Best Albums of 2021	7	
Stereogum	The 50 Best Albums of 2021	28	
Vulture	The Best Albums of 2021	9	
UPROXX	The Best Albums of 2021	N/A	
Variety	The Best Albums of 2021	N/A	

==== Awards ====
Awards and nominations for Star-Crossed
Association	Year	Category	Result
People's Choice Awards	2021	The Album of 2021	Nominated

== Commercial performance ==
Star-Crossed debuted at number one on the U.S. Top Country Albums chart, earning 77,000 album-equivalent units, of which 47,000 copies were pure sales, from its opening week. It became Musgraves' fourth number-one album on the chart. The album also debuted at number three on the all-genre Billboard 200, and number one on the Americana/Folk Albums chart; it became Musgraves' fourth top-ten album on the former and her second chart-topping debut on the latter. In addition, the album also accumulated a total of 38.23 million on-demand streams of the album's tracks. Six songs from Star-Crossed charted on the US Hot Country Songs chart, with "Justified" at number 22, "Simple Times" at number 31, "Breadwinner" at number 36, "Star-Crossed" at number 37, "Good Wife" at number 41 and "Cherry Blossom" at number 44.

In the United Kingdom the album debuted at number ten, becoming Musgraves' second consecutive top-ten album on the UK Albums Chart.

== Awards ceremony controversy ==
=== Grammy Awards ===
On October 10, 2021, Universal Music Group Nashville record label president Cindy Mabe wrote a letter to Recording Academy CEO Harvey Mason Jr. following the decision to place Musgraves' album in the pop music categories instead of the country music categories in regards to the forthcoming 64th Grammy Awards.

As a prime stakeholder in country music, I would really like to frame what's happening in our genre right now and help you and the Grammy's fully understand the importance of Kacey Musgraves to country music and why this decision is so much more than an entry point for an awards show. Taking her out of the country category actually does harm to a format struggling with change and inclusivity overall. ... This decision from the country committee to not accept Star-Crossed into the country albums category is very inconsistent and calls into question the other agendas that were part of this decision. ... This short-sided, biased decision will send ripples throughout our format to continue to insure that the message is sent that country music can only be for the limited few that enjoy the same perspective.

— Cindy Mabe, CEO of Universal Music Group Nashville, on the decision of the Recording Academy, Billboard

After Mabe's letter, Musgraves tweeted on Twitter: "You can take the girl out of the country (genre) but you can't take the country out of the girl." She also posted a collection of photos on her Instagram story, highlighting her ties to country music, such as pictures with Dolly Parton, Willie Nelson, Loretta Lynn, Shania Twain, and George Strait.

Variety reported that the country screening committee of the Recording Academy went through Star-Crossed "track by track", and decided that although there were some "country-leaning" songs on it, the album as a whole was not sufficiently country; however, the track "Camera Roll" was considered eligible for Best Country Song nominations. Music journalists Jem Aswad and Chris Willman stated Musgraves is not the first artist to face this situation, and highlighted how Taylor Swift's 1989 (2014) became her first album to be placed in pop categories when her previous efforts competed in country, Justin Bieber's Changes (2020) was rejected in the R&B field and moved to pop, and "Daddy Lessons" (2016) by Beyoncé was rejected in the country field as well. The country committee had sent Star-Crossed to its counterpart, the pop committee, as well, to see which genre the album fit, and would have reinstated the decision had the latter rejected it, but however, the pop committee agreed that pop is "the rightful home" for Star-Crossed. The album's genre placement issue was also raised in the core committee of the Recording Academy, which consists of artists from various genres and usually oversees only the "big four" general categories; the core committee upheld the decision that Star-Crossed is "primarily a pop album."

In conclusion, more than 60 academy members were involved in certifying the decision, with nearly all of them saying "it's a pop record." Variety also opined that, beyond the musical aspects of Star-Crossed, the letter by Musgraves' label to the Recording Academy is also due to the album's "business terms", as the pop field is highly competitive, compared to the country field, where Musgraves' chances of winning are higher. Aswad and Willman opined that Musgraves marketed Star-Crossed as a pop record, citing how it was jointly released with Interscope Records, which is primarily a pop label home to Lady Gaga, Billie Eilish, Olivia Rodrigo and many hip-hop artists, and none of the album's tracks were serviced to country radio stations, thus making it "hard to imagine that those moves went unnoticed by the [country] screening committee."

The nominations for the 64th Annual Grammy Awards were announced on November 22, 2021. "Camera Roll" received two nominations, for Best Country Solo Performance and Best Country Song. However, Star-Crossed was not nominated in any of the album categories.

=== Other country music awards ceremonies ===
Following the Grammy Award response regarding Star-Crossed's non-classification as country record, Billboard reported that the album "will be eligible in all appropriate categories" for both the Academy of Country Music Awards and the Country Music Association Awards. Although representatives from both ceremonies affirmed the eligibility of the record project, Musgraves was not nominated at either the 57th Academy of Country Music Awards or the 56th Annual Country Music Association Awards.

== Track listing ==
All tracks are written by Ian Fitchuk, Kacey Musgraves and Daniel Tashian, except where noted.

No.	Title	Length
1.	"Star-Crossed"	3:19
2.	"Good Wife"	3:51
3.	"Cherry Blossom"	3:04
4.	"Simple Times"	2:47
5.	"If This Was a Movie..."	3:15
6.	"Justified" (writers: Musgraves, Fitchuk, Ilsey Juber, BJ Burton)	3:01
7.	"Angel"	2:20
8.	"Breadwinner" (writers: Musgraves, Fitchuk, Juber, Burton)	3:21
9.	"Camera Roll"	2:39
10.	"Easier Said"	3:07
11.	"Hookup Scene"	3:21
12.	"Keep Lookin' Up"	2:46
13.	"What Doesn't Kill Me" (writers: Musgraves, Andrew Neely, Dante Jones, Dewain Whitmore Jr.)	2:17
14.	"There Is a Light"	3:52
15.	"Gracias a la Vida" (transl. Thanks to Life, writer: Violeta Parra)	4:32
Total length:		47:32

=== Notes ===
- All track titles are stylized in all lowercase.

== Personnel ==
Musicians

- Kacey Musgraves – vocals, background vocals (all tracks); percussion (12)
- Todd Lombardo – 12-string acoustic guitar (1), acoustic guitar (1–12, 14, 15), nylon-string guitar (1, 2), banjo (10), guitar (10, 14)
- Daniel Tashian – background vocals (1, 3, 6, 9, 11, 12, 14), baritone guitar, harp (1); keyboards (1, 3, 5), bass (2, 4, 6), Rhodes (2), drum programming (3, 4), electric guitar (3, 10, 13), programming (3, 4, 7), synthesizer (5, 6, 8–10, 13, 14), steel guitar (6, 10), horn, horn arrangement (9); timpani (12), guitar loops (13), Tibetan bells (13, 14)
- Fancy Hagood – background vocals (1)
- Ian Fitchuk – background vocals, piano (1); bass (1, 3, 4, 6–8, 12), drum programming (1–6, 8, 10, 14), keyboards (1, 3–8, 12), percussion (1, 2, 4, 6, 10, 12), drums (2–7, 9, 12–14), string arrangement (2, 7), synth bass (2), synthesizer (2, 4, 7–9, 14), acoustic guitar (5–8, 10, 11), electric guitar (8, 13), guitar loops (13), conga (14)
- Jacob Bryant – background vocals (1)
- John Osborne – background vocals (1)
- Leisa Hans – background vocals (1)
- Lucie Silvas – background vocals (1)
- Natalie Osborne – background vocals (1)
- TJ Osborne – background vocals (1)
- Kirsten Agresta Copely – harp (1)
- Matt Combs – cello, viola, violin (2, 7)
- Josh Moore – keyboards (4, 5, 10), bass (5, 10, 13, 14), drum programming (5, 8, 13), synthesizer (13)
- Viktor Krauss – bass (10)
- Dewain Whitmore Jr. – background vocals (13)
- Jim Hoke – flute (14)

Technical

- Ian Fitchuk, Kacey Musgraves, Daniel Tashian – producers
- Greg Calbi – mastering engineer
- Steve Fallone – mastering engineer
- Shawn Everett – mixer
- Craig Alvin – engineer
- Zack Pancoast – engineer
- Kristen Clark – production coordinator
- Ivan Wayman – assistant mixer
- Josh Moore – additional engineer

== Charts ==
=== Weekly charts ===
Weekly chart performance for Star-Crossed
Chart (2021)	Peak position
Australian Albums (ARIA)	9
Australian Country Albums (ARIA)	1
Belgian Albums (Ultratop Flanders)	156
Belgian Albums (Ultratop Wallonia)	185
Canadian Albums (Billboard)	9
Dutch Albums (Album Top 100)	89
German Albums (Offizielle Top 100)	55
Irish Albums (Official Charts)	16
New Zealand Albums (RMNZ)	30
Scottish Albums (Official Charts)	6
Spanish Albums (Promusicae)	52
Swiss Albums (Schweizer Hitparade)	98
UK Albums (Official Charts)	10
UK Country Albums (Official Charts)	1
US Billboard 200	3
US Americana/Folk Albums (Billboard)	1
US Top Country Albums (Billboard)	1

=== Year-end charts ===
2021 year-end chart performance for Star Crossed
Chart (2021)	Position
Australian Country Albums (ARIA)	45
US Top Album Sales (Billboard)	67
US Top Country Albums (Billboard)	46
US Folk Albums (Billboard)	16

2022 year-end chart performance for Star Crossed
Chart (2022)	Position
US Top Country Albums (Billboard)	73
