= Rockin' Around the Christmas Tree =

1958 Christmas song by Brenda Lee

Single by Brenda Lee

from the album Merry Christmas from Brenda Lee
- B-side: "Papa Noël"
- Released: November 24, 1958 (US); December 1962 (UK)
- Recorded: October 19, 1958
- Studio: Bradley Studios, Nashville, Tennessee
- Genre: Rockabilly; Christmas
- Length: 2:02
- Label: Decca 9-30776
- Songwriter: Johnny Marks
- Producer: Owen Bradley

Brenda Lee singles chronology
"Rock-a-Bye Baby Blues" (1957)	"Rockin' Around the Christmas Tree" (1958)	"I Want to Be Wanted (Per Tutta La Vita)" (1960)

Music video
- "Rockin' Around the Christmas Tree" on YouTube

"Rockin' Around the Christmas Tree" is a Christmas song written by Johnny Marks and recorded by Brenda Lee in 1958; it has since been recorded by numerous other music artists. By the song's 50th anniversary in 2008, Lee's original version had sold over 15 million copies around the world with the 4th most digital downloads sold of any Christmas single. In 2019, Lee's recording of the song was inducted into the Grammy Hall of Fame. In November 2023, Lee released a music video for the song, and in December, the song topped the US Billboard Hot 100 chart, marking Lee's third number-one single and making Lee the oldest artist ever to top the Hot 100 at age 78, later breaking the record once again one week later at the age of 79. The song also set the record for the longest period of time between an original release and its topping the Hot 100 (65 years), as well as the longest time between number-one singles by an artist: 63 years, one month and two weeks.

== Original recording by Brenda Lee ==
"Rockin' Around the Christmas Tree" was written by Johnny Marks, who had previously penned "Rudolph the Red-Nosed Reindeer" and "A Holly Jolly Christmas". Lee recorded the song when she was 13 years old. In a 2019 interview with The Tennessean, Lee recalled that she had no knowledge as to why Marks wanted her specifically to sing it: "I was only 12 [sic], and I had not had a lot of success in records, but for some reason he heard me and wanted me to do it. And I did."

"Rockin' Around the Christmas Tree" is a rockabilly song. The recording features Hank Garland and Harold Bradley on guitar, Floyd Cramer on piano, Boots Randolph on saxophone, Bob Moore on double bass, and veteran session player Buddy Harman on drums. The Brenda Lee recording is in the key of A-flat major.

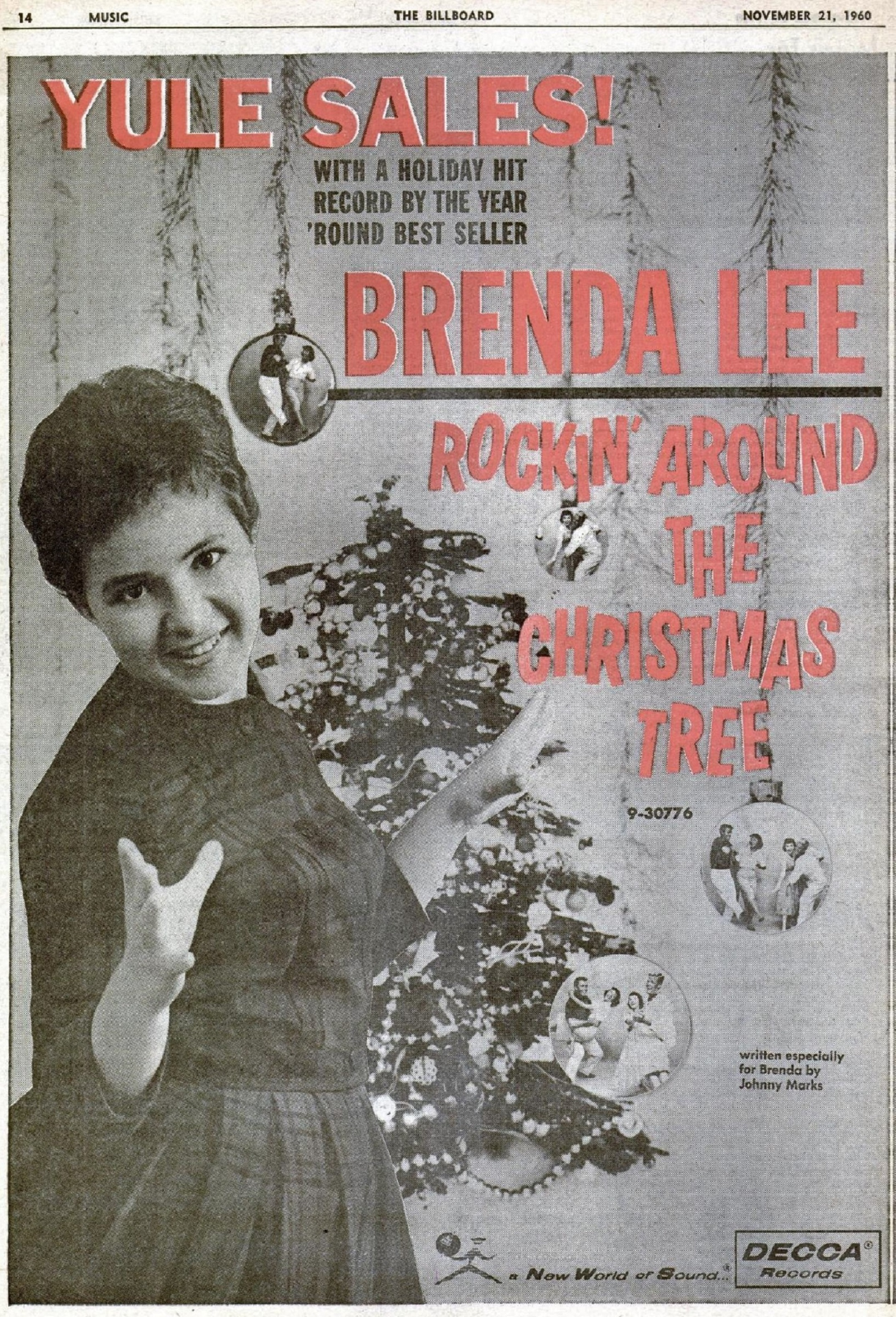
Billboard advertisement, November 21, 1960

An instrumental version of the song appears as background music in the 1964 television special Rudolph the Red-Nosed Reindeer, which exclusively featured music written by Marks. It can be heard in the scene where Rudolph first arrives at the Reindeer Games and meets another reindeer named Fireball. A fully sung version of the song would later appear in Rankin/Bass's 1979 sequel Rudolph and Frosty's Christmas in July. The song was also used in the 1990 film Home Alone during a scene when Kevin McCallister pretends that there is a holiday party taking place in his house, and discourages the burglars from robbing it. The song was also featured in The Christmas Special episode of Regular Show in 2012. The song was also used in D-TV set to the Disney cartoons, Pluto's Christmas Tree and Mickey's Christmas Carol.

In 1991, Lee rerecorded the song and other standards for A Brenda Lee Christmas, which includes only the rerecording and not the original version.

On November 3, 2023, Lee released a music video for the song, consisting of the 78-year-old Lee lip synching to the original recording of her 13-year-old voice at a party that includes Trisha Yearwood and fellow former teenage country music star Tanya Tucker.

In October 2024, Universal Music Group released “Noche Buena y Navidad,” a Spanish adaptation of the song that features an AI version of Lee’s vocals. Rewritten in Spanish and produced by producer/songwriter Auero Baqueiro, the goal was to make it sound like 13-year old Lee was singing the song in Spanish. The new version uses a plug-in from AI music tech company SoundLabs. To create “Noche Buena y Navidad,” after rewriting the song, Baquiero brought in Chilean vocalist Leyla Hoyle to record a Spanish language guide track while mimicking the pitch and phrasings of the original. The vocal stems were then sent to SoundLabs, which ran the vocals through its “Brenda Lee” AI vocal model that was trained on hours of the singer’s isolated vocal stems, including the original “Rockin’ Around the Christmas Tree.” Baquiero then mixed the new isolated AI-generated vocal into the original music elements of the track. The project was completed with a full sign-on from Lee. “Throughout my career, I performed and recorded many songs in different languages, but I never recorded ‘Rockin’ in Spanish, which I would have loved to do,” Lee said in a press release. “To have this out now is pretty incredible, and I’m happy to introduce the song to fans in a new way.”

=== Chart performance and sales ===
Although Decca released the single in both 1958 and again in 1959, it did not sell well until Lee became a popular star in 1960. That Christmas holiday season, Lee's "Rockin' Around the Christmas Tree" placed on the Billboard Hot 100 chart for the first time, eventually peaking at No. 14. It continued to sell well during subsequent holiday seasons, peaking as high as No. 3 on Billboard's Christmas Singles chart in December 1965. Lee said, "It was magic, and I think we all knew it. It took a few years to take off, but once it did, it really did."

The song experienced a large resurgence in popularity due to its use in the film Home Alone in 1990. Lee recalled, "Somebody called me and said, “Have you seen the movie Home Alone? You ought to, because they've got "Rockin'” really featured in it.” That's when it really took off with the youngsters. I knew it was special, but you never know what's going to be a hit — if you did, we'd all have hits every day. It has been a wonderful gift."

Lee's 1958 recording still receives a great deal of airplay, as radio station formats ranging from top 40 to adult contemporary to country music to oldies to even adult standards have played this version. It has since turned into a perennial holiday favorite, and due to rule changes in 2014 has returned annually to the Billboard Hot 100 chart, reaching No. 2 in the 2019 holiday season and returning to that runner-up position each of the following three years (for a total of nine nonconsecutive weeks at No. 2). In December 2023, the song finally reached No. 1. By attaining the Hot 100's top spot 65 years after its original release, the song broke the record for the longest amount of time for a single to make the number-one position. It was also only the third time in the over six-decade history of the Hot 100 chart that a Christmas/holiday song reached No. 1 (following "The Chipmunk Song (Christmas Don't Be Late)" by David Seville and The Chipmunks in December 1958, and "All I Want for Christmas Is You" by Mariah Carey in December 2019). With the achievement and her celebrating her 79th birthday at the same time, Lee also became the senior-most recording artist to top the Hot 100 chart, surpassing Louis Armstrong, who was 62 years old when "Hello, Dolly!" led the chart in early May 1964. Among female recording artists, Lee also passed the previous record held by Cher, who was 52 years old when "Believe" ruled the Hot 100 chart in March 1999. Making even more history, Lee set a new record for the longest break between number-one singles on the Hot 100 chart: 63 years, one month, and two weeks between "I Want to Be Wanted" making No. 1 on the week ending October 24, 1960, and the ascent of "Rockin' Around the Christmas Tree" to the top.

"Rockin' Around the Christmas Tree" has consistently been the most-played Christmas song on Spotify during the month of December since 2021.

Year	Chart debut/re-entry date	Peak chart position	Ref.
1960	December 12	14	
1961	December 11	50	
1962	December 15	59	
2014	January 4	50	
2015	December 26	30	
2016	December 24	27	
2017	December 23	30	
2018	December 8	9	
2019	December 7	2	
2020	November 28	2	
2021	December 4	2	
2022	November 26	2	
2023	December 2	1	
2024	November 30	2	
2025	November 22	2	
2026	November 21	30	

"Rockin' Around the Christmas Tree" reached over one million in digital downloads by 2016 according to Nielsen SoundScan, making it fifth on the list of all-time best-selling Christmas/holiday digital singles in SoundScan history. The song has sold 1,170,000 copies in the United States as of December 2019. On December 9, 2024, the Recording Industry Association of America certified "Rockin' Around the Christmas Tree" 7× Platinum for US sales of 7 million copies of the digital single.

On the official UK Singles Chart, "Rockin' Around the Christmas Tree" peaked at No. 6 when it was released in the United Kingdom in 1962. In 2013, due to downloads, it became one of a number of songs to re-enter the UK Singles Chart near Christmastime each holiday season. The single peaked at No. 63 on Sunday, December 15, 2013. Then in 2017, it reached No. 9 on the UK Singles Chart, its highest chart position since 1963. On the week ending January 5, 2023, the song reached No. 4, peaking two places higher than its original release 61 years prior.

=== Track listing ===
Side A

- "Rockin' Around the Christmas Tree" (Johnny Marks) – 2:02

Side B

- "Papa Noël" (Roy Botkin) – 2:25

=== Personnel ===
- Brenda Lee – lead vocals
- Hank Garland – guitar
- Harold Bradley – guitar
- Floyd Cramer – piano
- Bob Moore – bass
- Buddy Harman – drums
- Homer "Boots" Randolph – sax
- Anita Kerr Singers – background vocals

=== Charts ===
==== Weekly charts ====
Weekly chart performance
Chart (1958–2026)	Peak position
Australia (ARIA)	2
Austria (Ö3 Austria Top 40)	3
Canada (Canadian Hot 100)	1
Croatia (Billboard)	5
Croatia International Airplay (Top lista)	14
Czech Republic Singles Digital (ČNS IFPI)	5
Denmark (Tracklisten)	9
Estonia (Eesti Ekspress)	19
Estonia Airplay (TopHit)	71
Finland (Suomen virallinen lista)	5
France (SNEP)	4
Germany (GfK)	3
Global 200 (Billboard)	2
Greece (IFPI)	2
Hungary (Single Top 40)	2
Hungary (Stream Top 40)	2
Iceland (Tónlistinn)	8
Ireland (IRMA)	2
Italy (FIMI)	4
Japan Hot Overseas (Billboard Japan)	15
Latvia Streaming (LaIPA)	1
Lithuania (AGATA)	1
Luxembourg (Billboard)	2
Netherlands (Single Top 100)	3
New Zealand (Recorded Music NZ)	1
Norway (VG-lista)	5
Philippines Hot 100 (Billboard Philippines)	31
Poland (Polish Streaming Top 100)	3
Portugal (AFP)	4
Romania (Billboard)	15
Russia Streaming (TopHit)	33
Scottish Singles Sales (Official Charts)	46
Singapore (RIAS)	8
Slovakia Singles Digital (ČNS IFPI)	2
South Africa (RISA)	47
South Korea (Circle)	107
Spain (Promusicae)	22
Sweden (Sverigetopplistan)	2
Switzerland (Schweizer Hitparade)	3
United Arab Emirates (IFPI)	3
UK Singles (Official Charts)	3
US Billboard Hot 100	1
US Adult Contemporary (Billboard)	16
US Holiday 100 (Billboard)	1
US Hot Country Songs (Billboard)	62
US Rolling Stone Top 100	2
Vietnam (Vietnam Hot 100)	92

==== Monthly charts ====
Monthly chart performance for "Rockin' Around the Christmas Tree"
Chart (2025)	Peak position
Lithuania Airplay (TopHit)	25

==== Year-end charts ====
2020 year-end chart performance
Chart (2020)	Position
Hungary (Stream Top 40)	77

2021 year-end chart performance
Chart (2021)	Position
Canada (Canadian Hot 100)	98
Global 200 (Billboard)	169
Hungary (Stream Top 40)	89
US Billboard Hot 100	92

2022 year-end chart performance
Chart (2022)	Position
Canada (Canadian Hot 100)	98
Global 200 (Billboard)	155
Hungary (Stream Top 40)	75
UK Singles (OCC)	75
US Billboard Hot 100	80

2023 year-end chart performance
Chart (2023)	Position
Canada (Canadian Hot 100)	63
Global 200 (Billboard)	146
Hungary (Single Top 40)	39
Switzerland (Schweizer Hitparade)	96
UK Singles (OCC)	67
US Billboard Hot 100	60

2024 year-end chart performance
Chart (2024)	Position
Austria (Ö3 Austria Top 40)	49
Canada (Canadian Hot 100)	71
Global 200 (Billboard)	149
Switzerland (Schweizer Hitparade)	92
UK Singles (OCC)	80
US Billboard Hot 100	59

2025 year-end chart performance
Chart (2025)	Position
Canada (Canadian Hot 100)	88
Germany (GfK)	70
Global 200 (Billboard)	144
Switzerland (Schweizer Hitparade)	70
US Billboard Hot 100	67

=== Certifications ===
Region	Certification	Certified units/sales
Canada (Music Canada)	8× Platinum	640,000^{‡}
Denmark (IFPI Danmark)	2× Platinum	180,000^{‡}
Germany (BVMI)	3× Gold	900,000^{‡}
Italy (FIMI)	Platinum	100,000^{‡}
New Zealand (RMNZ)	3× Platinum	90,000^{‡}
Portugal (AFP)	2× Platinum	50,000^{‡}
Spain (Promusicae)	Platinum	60,000^{‡}
United Kingdom (BPI)	5× Platinum	3,000,000^{‡}
United States (RIAA)	7× Platinum	7,000,000^{‡}
Streaming
Greece (IFPI Greece)	2× Platinum	4,000,000^{†}
^{‡} Sales+streaming figures based on certification alone.^{†} Streaming-only figures based on certification alone.

== Kim Wilde and Mel Smith version ==
"Rockin' Around the Christmas Tree"

Single by Comic Relief presents Mel & Kim
- B-side: "Deck the Blooming Halls"
- Released: November 23, 1987
- Genre: Christmas, Comedy
- Length: 3:38
- Label: Ten
- Songwriter: Johnny Marks
- Producer: Stuart Colman

Kim Wilde singles chronology
"Say You Really Want Me" (1987)	"Rockin' Around the Christmas Tree" (1987)	"Hey Mister Heartache" (1988)

Music video
- Mel & Kim "Rockin' Around The Christmas Tree" on YouTube

A version of the song by Kim Wilde and Mel Smith (credited as "Mel & Kim" as a parody of then-popular sister act Mel and Kim), featuring Pete Thomas, reached No. 3 on the UK Singles Chart during the Christmas season 1987.

Its accompanying video featured the two hosting a Christmas party with guests including The Mekon and an appearance from Smith's comedy partner Griff Rhys Jones, carol singers played by the band Curiosity Killed the Cat and Spitting Image puppets of Bette Midler and Tina Turner. Rolf Harris' cover of "Two Little Boys" (the Christmas number one single of 1969) was referred to in the song lyrics and at this point a photo of him was shown in the video - however, since Harris was disgraced for sexual offence crimes, this reference has been cropped out of airplay, except in Australia where the clip is played in full. The ABC network in Australia played the unedited clip as recently as 25 December 2024.

=== Charts ===
Chart (1987–2023)	Peak position
Denmark (Tracklisten)	16
Ireland (IRMA)	4
Luxembourg (Radio Luxembourg)	3
Norway (VG-lista)	9
Slovakia Airplay (ČNS IFPI)	35
Sweden Heatseeker (Sverigetopplistan)	20
UK Singles (Official Charts)	3

=== Certifications ===
Region	Certification	Certified units/sales
Denmark (IFPI Danmark)	2× Platinum	180,000^{‡}
United Kingdom (BPI)	Silver	250,000^{^}
^{^} Shipments figures based on certification alone.^{‡} Sales+streaming figures based on certification alone.

== Kacey Musgraves and Camila Cabello version ==
"Rockin' Around the Christmas Tree"

Song by Kacey Musgraves featuring Camila Cabello

from the album The Kacey Musgraves Christmas Show
- Released: November 28, 2019
- Genre: Country
- Length: 2:04
- Label: MCA Nashville
- Songwriter: Johnny Marks
- Producers: Ben Winston; Emma Conway; Fulwell 73 Productions; Jason Owen; Kacey Musgraves; Kyle Ryan

American country singer Kacey Musgraves released a cover version of the song featuring Cuban-born American pop singer Camila Cabello as a track on her soundtrack album The Kacey Musgraves Christmas Show on November 28, 2019.

=== Personnel ===
- Kacey Musgraves – lead vocals
- Camila Cabello – featured artist, vocals
- Adam Keafer – bass
- Brett Resnick – pedal steel
- Kai Welch – moog bass, organ
- Kyle Ryan – background vocals, bells, electric guitar, mellotron, recording engineering, tambourine
- Nat Smith – mellotron
- Scott Quintana – bells, drums, percussion
- Timothy McKay – baritone saxophone
- Gena Johnson – production coordinating, recording engineering
- Mike Abbott – recording engineering
- Leslie Ritcher – studio personnel
- Chip Matthews – studio personnel
- Darrell Thorp – studio personnel
- David Ives – studio personnel

=== Charts ===
Chart (2020–2025)	Peak position
Poland (Polish Airplay Top 100)	27
US Bubbling Under Hot 100 (Billboard)	13
US Hot Country Songs (Billboard)	20
US Holiday 100 (Billboard)	97

== Justin Bieber version ==
"Rockin' Around the Christmas Tree"

Single by Justin Bieber
- Released: November 12, 2020 (promotional release); October 29, 2021 (official release)
- Length: 2:12
- Label: Def Jam Recordings
- Songwriter: Johnny Marks

Justin Bieber singles chronology
"Ghost" (2021)	"Rockin' Around the Christmas Tree" (2021)	"Lonely Christmas" (2021)

Alternative cover
- Cover art for the promotional single release

Audio video
- "Rockin' Around the Christmas Tree" on YouTube

Canadian singer Justin Bieber released a cover version of the song as a promotional single on November 12, 2020, exclusively on Amazon Music. On October 29, 2021, the song was released on streaming platforms worldwide as an official single.

=== Background ===
Talking about the cover, Bieber said: "Rockin' Around the Christmas Tree" has always been one of my favourite songs to celebrate the holidays and I'm excited to team up with Amazon Music to share my own version, with my fans. I'm so thankful to be able to spend the season with loved ones, and to also use this opportunity to give back to LIFT, Inner-City Arts and Alexandria House: three incredible organizations that I've supported in the past. I hope my fans join me in reaching out to the communities and organizations they care about, to help spread joy to those who need it most."

=== Commercial performance ===
On December 25, 2020, the song entered the top 20, arriving at #8. The following week, on January 1, 2021, it further climbed to #4, its peak position.

=== Charts ===
Chart (2020–2024)	Peak position
Canada AC (Billboard)	33
Croatia International Airplay (Top lista)	18
Estonia Airplay (TopHit)	59
Global 200 (Billboard)	66
Italy (FIMI)	36
Mexico Ingles Airplay (Billboard)	22
UK Singles (Official Charts)	4
US Billboard Hot 100	61
US Adult Contemporary (Billboard)	14
US Holiday 100 (Billboard)	40

=== Certifications ===
Region	Certification	Certified units/sales
Italy (FIMI)	Gold	50,000^{‡}
United Kingdom (BPI)	Silver	200,000^{‡}
^{‡} Sales+streaming figures based on certification alone.

== Other recordings ==
Many artists have recorded the song. The most prominent are:

- 1998 • Cyndi Lauper for her album Merry Christmas... Have a Nice Life.
- 1999 • Alabama, on its album Christmas Vol. II (this cover version peaked at No. 64 on the Billboard Hot Country Singles & Tracks chart.)
- 2004 • LeAnn Rimes, for her album What a Wonderful World (this cover version peaked at No. 3 on Billboard Adult Contemporary chart, No. 48 on Billboard Country Singles chart, and No. 30 on Billboard's Holiday Songs chart.)
- 2006 • Miley Cyrus as Hannah Montana covered the song on the album Disney Channel Holiday.
- 2021 • Meghan Trainor covered the song on her deluxe edition of the album A Very Trainor Christmas.
- 2021 • Kelly Clarkson covered the song on her album When Christmas Comes Around…
- 2023 • Ann-Margret covered the song on her album Born to Be Wild.

=== Meghan Trainor version ===
==== Weekly charts ====
Weekly chart performance
Chart (2025)	Peak position
Moldova Airplay (TopHit)	38
Ukraine Airplay (TopHit)	92

==== Monthly charts ====
Monthly chart performance
Chart (2025)	Peak position
Moldova Airplay (TopHit)	82

== See also ==
- List of best-selling singles
