= Justified (song) =

2021 single by Kacey Musgraves

Single by Kacey Musgraves

from the album Star-Crossed
- Released: August 27, 2021
- Genre: Country pop
- Length: 3:01
- Label: MCA Nashville; Interscope
- Songwriters: Kacey Musgraves; Ilsey Juber; BJ Burton; Ian Fitchuk
- Producers: Ian Fitchuk; Daniel Tashian; Kacey Musgraves

Kacey Musgraves singles chronology
"Easy" (remix) (2020)	"Justified" (2021)	"Camera Roll" (2022)

Music video
- "Justified" on YouTube

"Justified" is a song by American country music artist Kacey Musgraves. It was released on August 27, 2021, as the lead single from Musgraves' fifth studio album, Star-Crossed, released on September 10, 2021. Musgraves co-wrote the song with Ilsey Juber, BJ Burton and Ian Fitchuk, and produced it with Fitchuk and Daniel Tashian.

== Content ==
In an interview with Elle in May 2021, Musgraves talked about the inspiration for the song, her divorce with Ruston Kelly: "I felt, in many ways, on top of the world in my career, but in my personal life, I felt like I was dying inside. I was crumbling. I was sad. I felt lonely. I felt broken."

Matt Doria of NME pointed out that the song "serve[s] as a poignant reflection on Musgraves' divorce from country singer Ruston Kelly". Andy Sahadeo of Nicki Swift described the song as "a somber contemplation of the singer's personal life over the past few years".

== Critical reception ==
Jason Friedman of Paste felt that the track "recalls some of the warmth of previous album Golden Hour, with the track serving as an uptempo reminder that 'healing doesn't happen in a straight line,' as the singer wrestles with the different mood cycles that follow a breakup."

== Music video ==
The music video was directed by Bardia Zeinali, and taken from the film Star-Crossed. The video begins with Musgraves "driving solemnly through a desert while listening to a commercial on love counseling from the car radio". She drives through "different environments and weather, likes a green-lit tunnel, a snowy forest, rain, an urban city, and an autumn highway".

== Commercial performance ==
"Justified" debuted at number 31 on the Billboard Hot Country Songs chart dated September 11, 2021. After the album was released, it climbed to number 22 on the chart dated September 25, 2021.

== Live performance ==
On October 2, 2021, Musgraves performed the song almost completely nude save for a pair of boots on the 47th season of Saturday Night Live.

== Charts ==
Chart performance for "Justified"
Chart (2021)	Peak position
Australia Country Top 50 (TMN)	12
New Zealand Hot Singles (RMNZ)	23
US Bubbling Under Hot 100 (Billboard)	2
US Adult Contemporary (Billboard)	28
US Adult Pop Airplay (Billboard)	21
US Hot Country Songs (Billboard)	22
US Pop Airplay (Billboard)	37
US Rock & Alternative Airplay (Billboard)	50

== Release history ==
Release history for "Justified"
Region	Date	Format	Label	Ref.
Various	August 27, 2021	Digital download; streaming	MCA Nashville; Interscope	
United States	September 13, 2021	Adult contemporary radio	MCA Nashville	
United States	September 13, 2021	Adult alternative radio	MCA Nashville	
United States	September 14, 2021	Contemporary hit radio	MCA Nashville	
