= Diane Venora =

American actress

- Education: Boston Conservatory; Juilliard School (BFA)
- Occupation: Actress
- Years active: 1979–present
- Spouse: Andrzej Bartkowiak (m. 1980; div. 1989)
- Children: 1

Diane Venora is an American stage, television and film actress. She graduated from the Juilliard School in 1977 and made her film debut in 1981 opposite Albert Finney in Wolfen. She won the New York Film Critics Circle Award for Best Supporting Actress for Bird (1988). Her other films include The Cotton Club (1984), Ironweed (1987), Heat (1995), Romeo + Juliet (1996), The Jackal (1997), The Insider (1999) and Hamlet (2000).

== Early life ==
Venora is one of six children of Marie (née Brooks) and Robert P. Venora, who owned a dry cleaning business. She graduated from East Hartford High School (class of 1970), where she was active in musicals and plays. She studied at Boston Conservatory of Music and two years later won a scholarship to Juilliard School in New York City, where she graduated in 1977. At Juilliard she was a member of the drama department's Group 6 (1973–1977), which included Kelsey Grammer, Harriet Sansom Harris and Robin Williams.

== Career ==
After graduation, Venora performed extensively on the stage, particularly in Shakespearean plays. She made her film debut alongside Albert Finney and Gregory Hines in Wolfen (1981). In 1983, she starred in Joseph Papp's production of Hamlet at the New York Shakespeare Festival in the lead role, the first woman to play the role at the prestigious showcase. She has a long history with Hamlet, having played the title role, as well as Ophelia opposite Kevin Kline, and Gertrude onscreen opposite Ethan Hawke.

In 1994, after taking five years off to care for her daughter, Venora landed a starring role in the TV series Thunder Alley, followed by a recurring role as plastic surgeon Geri Infante in the TV series Chicago Hope.

In 1995 she starred opposite Al Pacino in Heat, earning high regard from critics and audiences for her portrayal of Justine Hanna, the Pacino character's troubled wife. Her other performances include Gloria Capulet [Juliet Capulet's mother] in Romeo + Juliet (1996), The Jackal (1997), The 13th Warrior (1999), The Insider (1999), and All Good Things (2010).

== Personal life ==
Venora married cinematographer Andrzej Bartkowiak in 1980; they divorced in 1989. That year, she took time off from show business to spend more time with her daughter Madzia, then eight. During her hiatus, Venora lived in New York City, teaching disadvantaged children and acting in an occasional play. In 1994, she and her daughter moved to Los Angeles.

== Stage credits ==
Year	Title	Role	Notes
1981	Penguin Touquet	Other (Same) Woman	
1981	Miss Julie		
1982	A Midsummer Night's Dream	Hippolyta	
1982	Hamlet	Prince Hamlet	
1983	Uncle Vanya	Yelyna	
1984	Peer Gynt	Green Woman	
1984	Messiah	Rachel	
1985	Tomorrow's Monday	Dora Allen	
1986	Largo Desolato	Lucy	
1986	A Man for All Seasons	Lady Margaret More	
1986	The School for Scandal	Lady Teazle	
1989	The Winter's Tale	Hermione	
1990	Hamlet	Ophelia	
1998	Tongue of a Bird	Mother	
1999-2000	Hamlet	Gertrude	
2000	The Seagull		As director
2000	Macbeth	Lady Macbeth	
2001	Celebration		
2001	The Room		
2001-02	Necessary Targets	Zlata	
2002	God of Vengeance	Sara	
2003	The Burning Deck		
2012	As You Like It	Jaques	
2016	110 Stories		

== Filmography ==
=== Film ===
Year	Title	Role	Notes
1979	All That Jazz	Extra	Uncredited
1980	Getting There	Melanie	Short film
1981	Wolfen	Rebecca Neff	
1984	The Cotton Club	Gloria Swanson	
1985	Terminal Choice	Anna Lang	
1986	F/X	Ellen Keith	
1987	Ironweed	Margaret 'Peg' Phelan	
1988	Bird	Chan Parker	New York Film Critics Circle Award for Best Supporting Actress; Sant Jordi Award for Best Foreign Actress; Nominated- Golden Globe Award for Best Supporting Actress– Motion Picture; Nominated- Los Angeles Film Critics Association Award for Best Supporting Actress
1995	Three Wishes	Joyce	
1995	Heat	Justine Hanna	Nominated- Chicago Film Critics Association Award for Best Supporting Actress
1996	The Substitute	Jane Hetzko	
1996	Surviving Picasso	Jacqueline Roque	
1996	Romeo + Juliet	Gloria Capulet	
1997	Seed: A Love Story	Julia	Short film
1997	The Jackal	Maj. Valentina Koslova	
1999	True Crime	Barbara Everett	
1999	The 13th Warrior	Queen Weilew	
1999	The Joyriders	Celeste	
1999	The Young Girl and the Monsoon	Giovanna	
1999	The Insider	Liane Wigand	
2000	Hamlet	Gertrude	
2000	Looking for an Echo	Joanne Delgado	
2001	Megiddo: The Omega Code 2	Gabriella Francini	
2002	Heartbreak Hospital	Sunday Tyler / Andrea Harmon	
2004	Stateside	Mrs. Hengen	
2005	Self Medicated	Louise Eriksen	Phoenix Film Festival Copper Wing Award for Best Acting Ensemble
2005	Touched	Carole Davis	
2008	Stiletto	Sylvia Vadalos	
2008	Childless	Mary	
2009	Follow the Prophet	Red	
2009	Little Hercules in 3-D	Hera	
2009	The Ministers	Gina Santana	
2010	All Good Things	Janice Rizzo	
2021	Star-Crossed: The Film	House Mother / School Administrator / Demonstrator	
2022	First Love	Aunt Irene	

=== Television ===
Year	Title	Role	Notes
1981	Nurse	Ellen Brill	Episode: "Rivals"
1982	Rehearsing Hamlet	Self	A television documentary about Joseph Papp's stage production of Hamlet with Diane Venora in the lead role.
1982	A Midsummer Night's Dream	Hippolyta	TV movie
1983	Cook & Peary: The Race to the Pole	Marie Fidele Hunt	TV movie
1985	A.D.	Corinna	TV movie
1990	Great Performances	Ophelia	Episode: "Hamlet"
1993	Law & Order	Mara Feder	Episode: "Night & Fog"
1994	Thunder Alley	Bobbi Turner	Recurring role
1994–95	Chicago Hope	Dr. Geri Infante	Recurring role
1996	Special Report: Journey to Mars	Lt. Tanya Sadavoy	TV movie
2000	Race Against Time	Dr. Helen Steele	TV movie
2000	The Practice	Margaret Wakefield	Episode: "Appeal and Denial"
2004	Class Actions	Justine Harrison	TV movie
2004	Law & Order: Special Victims Unit	Marilyn Nesbit	Episode: "Home"
2005	Threshold	Andrea Hatten / Angela Hatten	4 episodes
2005	C.S. Lewis: Beyond Narnia	Joy Gresham	TV movie
2006	Criminal Minds	Doris	Episode: "The Fisher King: Part 1"
2008	Eleventh Hour	Lea Muller	Episode: "Resurrection"
2009	Private Practice	Sharon	Episode: "Second Chances"
2009	NCIS	Shada Shakarji	Episode: "Outlaws and In-Laws"
2010	Grey's Anatomy	Audrey Taylor	Episode: "Push"
2010	The Wish List	Brenda	TV movie
2016	The Victorians	Mary Rutherford	TV movie
