= Star-Crossed: The Film =

2021 film directed by Bardia Zeniali

- Directed by: Bardia Zeinali
- Produced by: Michelle An; Chelsea Dodson; Kerry Haynie; Eric Stern
- Starring: Kacey Musgraves; Diane Venora; Jasmine Guillen; Ava Grey; Victoria Walls; Sarah Polednak; Idaliz Cristian; Morgan Jean-Quinn
- Cinematography: Matthew Libatique
- Production companies: Anonymous Content; Golden Girl Productions; Interscope Films; MCA Nashville; Sandbox Entertainment
- Distributed by: Paramount+
- Release dates: September 7, 2021 (Schermerhorn Symphony Center); September 10, 2021 (United States)
- Running time: 48 minutes
- Country: United States
- Language: English

Star-Crossed: The Film (stylized in all lowercase) is a 2021 American romantic fantasy film that served as the visual companion to Kacey Musgraves' fifth studio album of the same. The film was directed by Bardia Zeinali, from a script, he co-wrote with Musgraves; she further executive-produced and starred in the lead role, while featuring cameo appearances by actor Eugene Levy, RuPaul's Drag Race winner Symone, rapper Princess Nokia, actor Victoria Pedretti, and comedian Meg Stalter. It was shot by cinematographer Matthew Libatique for 10 days at Los Angeles, filmed adhering to the safety regulations due to COVID-19 pandemic.

Musgraves' divorce from singer-songwriter Ruston Kelly, and the aftermath had inspired her to write the album, and has further took inspirations from Greek tragedies and Romeo and Juliet, the famous play by William Shakespeare. The visual companion to the album was characterized as having "a sense of heightened reality" as the creators intended to feel it as cinematic and epic without compromising the emotions and telling her story through the lens of art and fashion.

Star-Crossed: The Film was premiered at the Schermerhorn Symphony Center on September 7, 2021 and one-night screening held across 25 theatres in the United States, the following day. The film premiered at Paramount+, on September 10, the same date as the album released. Critics praised Musgraves' performance, and the surreal and self-realistic tone of the film, while complimenting the direction, costume design and cinematography. The film received a nomination for Best Longform Video at the 2022 MTV Video Music Awards.

== Plot ==
Cast
- Actor: Role
Kacey Musgraves	The Bride
Diane Venora	House Mother / School Administrator / Demonstrator
Jasmine Guillen	Showgirl 1
Victoria Walls	Showgirl 2
Courtney Scarr	Showgirl 3
Ava Grey	Maid 1
Sarah Polednak	Maid 2
Idaliz Cristian	Maid 3
Morgan Jean-Quinn	Maid 4
Lauren Powers	Woman in Bikini and Fur / Ambulance Driver
Victoria Pedretti	Heist Girl 1
Symone	Heist Girl 2
Princess Nokia	Heist Girl 3
Meg Stalter	Heist Gear Driver
Eugene Levy	Doctor
Carol Dedeaux	Speed Walker Woman
Roy Allen	Speed Walker Woman
Courtney Parchman	Bridal Shop Bride
Karen Lancaster	Mother of the Bride
Mikul Robins	Store Clerk
John William Connolly	Hot Dog Boy

Musgraves is featured as the Bride, in the introduction set at a dressing room of a strip club and thereafter, she was performing the title track at a drab desert highway, with the bride being surrounded by dancers in multi-colored outfits. The story was structured into three-acts, as the album.

In the first act of the film, it showcases the bride performing a heist at a wedding shop with his fellow heist girls, and goes to "wife-training school" where she was taught the finer points of domestic bliss. In the second act, she was seen driving through different locations and seasons, serving as a metaphor for the mix of emotions she felt through the breakup, and she is met with a car accident, but being recovered at the end of the act. In the third and final act, the bride was seen in the Los Angeles River, trying out to outrun a black stallion and finds a bottle of pills, where she eats one, hallucinates and ends up in a church. She sings "Gracias a la Vida", thereby concluding the film.

== Production ==
=== Influences ===
Star-Crossed was inspired by Musgraves' personal journey of heartache and healing following her divorce from American singer-songwriter Ruston Kelly. In an interview with Zane Lowe on Apple Music, she recalled the she did not have a concept for the album and it was "going to be a bunch of sad songs". But after learning about the structure of ancient Greek theatres, she described its concept as chronicling a "modern tragedy in three acts", and influenced William Shakespeare's famous play Romeo and Juliet and other Greek tragedies for the same. She further elaborated its concept in the interaction, saying: "It's to be f**ked by love or luck. You're ill-fated, it's just not written in the stars. It is not for you. And everyone puts out their highlight reel, nobody's putting out their f**k ups. And that's one of the reasons why it's daunting."

=== Background and development ===
In a Zoom interaction to Vogue, Musgraves said that the film is not a "one-off music video" but completely different from others, as she felt that the chapter in her life, deserved a right depiction, admitting that she had "never been able to devote this much creative space to the visual aspect of a project before, and it's been a blessing to convey her story in this form" admitting she was in an "intense place of healing" when the filming was begun.

Musgraves met music video director Bardia Zeinali on a video shoot for the same magazine. The duo worked on the film while the album was still under curation, and Musgraves shared snippets and ideas to develop the album. Zeinali recalled that his conversations with Musgraves did not have plans for a companion album and film. But he felt it as a fulfilling experience as she allowed him into her process and shared her thoughts, allowing him to understand her places and the context she had written. In January, after attending a therapy session, Musgraves had rewatched Romeo + Juliet (1996) shortly after as she had developed several imageries at that time, and was newly inspired by the film's sentiment. The ideas and imagery took shape as she went to the studio, and described the album's concept, saying:

"I became obsessed with the meaning of the word 'tragedy'. Tragedy has been at the core of the most popular artwork and storytelling since the dawn of time, and it's remained so popular because there is something cathartic in watching a character, feeling for them, then witnessing their downfall. Either you relate their tragedy to your life, or viewing allows you to forget your own."

Since the songs have been written chronologically, Zeniali had to concentrate the visualization, transitions and how Musgraves would be represented, in the film, and thought a lot about Musgraves as an artist and what she represents, adding that she was unique, when coming to pop culture and the non-homogenous reach she has all over the world. Hence, he had to represent the different sides of Musgraves.

=== Design ===
To accomplish her on-screen representation, Musgraves had to feature into multiple transformations. Fashion designer Erica Cloud had worked on the costumes for Musgraves and other characters. In the title track, she was seen as Moschino-clad bride, while in the track "Simple Times" she was seen wearing turtleneck cropped sweater and bright hued footwear, while the other actresses (Pedretti, Symone and Princess Nokia) wear similar artists, but in different colors. It was seen as a homage to Versace's fall 1994 modelling campaign, which Cloud had admitted Musgraves had the aura of former supermodel Stephanie Seymour and the costumes had complimented that. She and her fashion design team reached to Versace to recreate the brand's recent collections.

Cloud felt it essential to use female designers and smaller brands throughout the film as it connected well with the music. She also complimented Harley Viera-Newton on doing a cameo apart from contributing to the costumes through her HVN brand. Zeinali thought that the costume design and its versatility were "wild", especially the crystallized eyebrow and the bombastic bridal dress inspired by "November Rain", which felt true to Musgraves' identity.

On the stripped-down look, she wore for the song "Justified", Musgraves added that, in the middle of all the glamour, there is a moment where she expresses a multitude of emotions and wanted to be "as undone as it could be". That look was considered to be her "rawest" and "most human form" which she felt it great to juxtapose it with all the fantasy.

=== Filming ===
Star-Crossed was shot in and around Los Angeles by cinematographer Matthew Libatique during the week beginning July 4, the same date when Musgraves' had divorced Kelly, a year before. She felt like reliving her actual life, metaphorically on-screen, but in a "heightened and fantastical" way.

The filming conducted adhering to the safety precautions to curb the COVID-19 spread, but due to restrictions, Zeinali had to direct the first three days through FaceTime in his home, which he thought as "devastating" despite having so much time on pre-production, but praised the contribution of the cast and crew. Musgraves added that several creative decisions on set have to be made on the fly, which she consider it as a huge undertaking. Some of the filming locations, included Sanctuary Adventist Church, used as a filming location for popular films, such as The Terminator (1984) and Kill Bill (2003).

== Release ==
The first trailer for Star-Crossed debuted at social media platforms on August 23, 2021, coinciding the album's announcement and the title track being released as a promotional single on the same date. A private screening for the film was held at the Schermerhorn Symphony Center in Nashville, Tennessee on September 7, 2021 for industry insiders. The following day, the film was screened at 25 theatres in the United States for one night only. Star-Crossed premiered at Paramount+ in conjunction with the album, on September 10 across the United States, Canada, Australia, Latin America and the Nordic countries. In countries, where access to Paramount+ not being available, the film was broadcast on MTV across its worldwide network of channels in nearly 180 regions. The film was posted on YouTube on September 10, 2024.

== Reception ==
Writing for Uproxx, Rachel Brodsky complimented the film "magnetic, colorful, stylish, at times hilarious, tragic, and surreal". Imogen Marshall of Off the Record reviewed it as "an incredibly detailed and sumptuously fun and upbeat take on divorce and pain, embracing the ridiculousness and the exaggerated nature of tragedies. It embraces the full extent and pushes the boundaries of Musgraves' creativity." Benjamin H. Smith of Decider called "Star-Crossed: The Film shows that Musgraves' ambitions as an artist transcend whatever narrow classifications the music industry tries to ascribe her." Sam Sodomsky of Pitchfork commented that the film accompaniment "sets itself up to address societal concerns" but finds its "most effective visualization with Musgraves alone in her car, singing along to the music". It further captured its "surreal, and self-realistic tone" by "following actors back to their trailers on set, where they watch the final scene of Romeo and Juliet and help Musgraves through her many costume changes".

Craig Jenkins of Vulture reviewing for the companion film, said that "The star-crossed film is a fever dream of heists, parties, chase sequences, car crashes, and hospital trips. The core theme is recovery, but the film is also laid out like an acid trip, full of arresting images, slow zooms on liminal spaces, and colorful lights." He added that the film takes liberties on music, thereby "screwing, stripping, and deconstructing the songs in ways that suggest that a full dub version or Chopstars remix might be a blast". In comparison with the album and film, Charlie Becht of The Ithacan wrote "The film expresses the album's inspiration to modernize the classic tragedy, albeit sacrificing powerful standouts from the album, whereas the album articulates a new acumen to Musgraves, but muddles the theatricality of the tragedy motif. Ultimately, the two mediums share the same name but differ in their thematic accomplishments."

== Accolades ==
Star-Crossed: The Film was shortlisted for nominations in the Best Longform Video category at the 2022 MTV Video Music Awards. Other contenders include: Happier Than Ever: A Love Letter to Los Angeles, Madame X and All Too Well: The Short Film (all released in 2021) and Driving Home 2 U and Studio 666 (2022). The ceremony was held on August 28, 2022 and All Too Well won the award.
