= High Horse (Kacey Musgraves song) =

- Remix EP cover

Single by Kacey Musgraves

from the album Golden Hour
- Released: June 25, 2018
- Genre: Disco; country pop
- Length: 3:33
- Label: MCA Nashville
- Songwriters: Trent Dabbs; Kacey Musgraves; Tommy English
- Producers: Ian Fitchuk; Daniel Tashian; Kacey Musgraves

Kacey Musgraves singles chronology
"Space Cowboy" / "Butterflies" (2018)	"High Horse" (2018)	"Rainbow" (2019)

"High Horse" is a song written and recorded by American country music singer and songwriter Kacey Musgraves for her fourth studio album, Golden Hour (2018). Musgraves co-wrote the song with Trent Dabbs and Tommy English, and co-produced the track with Ian Fitchuk and Daniel Tashian. It was first released as a digital promotional single on March 22, 2018, and later impacted American hot adult contemporary radio on June 25, 2018, as the album's third official single. An extended play of remixes was issued on July 3, 2018.

"High Horse" reached number 36 on the US Billboard Hot Country Songs chart and also became Musgraves's first song to crossover to pop radio, debuting and peaking at number 39 on the Adult Pop Songs airplay chart.

== Content ==
"High Horse" is a disco song which incorporates elements of country instrumentation and layered vocals. The song utilizes synths and a "spritely" disco beat, with the overall sound being described by Rolling Stone as the "most radical departure yet" from Musgraves's previous releases. The Bee Gees and Daft Punk are cited as influences on the style of "High Horse". Lyrically, the song utilizes word play and double entendres to compare a conceited individual to a prized horse, who Musgraves encourages to "giddy-up" and "ride straight out of this town."

== Critical reception ==
Margaret Farrell of Pitchfork praised the song's word play and fusion of disco and country sounds, writing that Musgraves "sure makes a great pop star," and "has opened up a fascinating new door for herself." Jude Rogers of The Guardian singled out "High Horse" as a highlight of Musgraves's concert at the Bristol Hippodrome in the United Kingdom, writing that the track "shows how country can be melded brilliantly with late-70s, Chic-like disco, pointing towards a style with which Musgraves could truly conquer the world." Michael Watkins of Under the Radar praised the songwriting on the track, writing that "tracks like "Butterflies" and "High Horse" offer the best of what Musgraves can do in terms of balancing her obvious charm against a certain steely underbelly." Stereogum ranked the song at number two on their list of the five best songs of the week following its release, calling it "her most fun song yet."

== Commercial performance ==
"High Horse" debuted at number 39 on the Hot Country Songs chart date April 7, 2018, and rose to its peak position of 36 the following week after the release of Golden Hour. Following the song's radio release, it debuted at number 39 on the Adult Pop Songs chart, becoming her first song to appear on a pop-oriented airplay chart. The song notably debuted concurrently with Dan + Shay's "Tequila" (also that artist's first crossover experience), prompting discussion over the greater inclusion of country tracks on adult pop playlists. On November 15, 2023, the single was certified Platinum by the Recording Industry Association of America (RIAA) for combined sales and streaming data of over 500,000 units in the United States.

== Music video ==
An accompanying music video directed by Hannah Lux Davis premiered July 12, 2018. Musgraves begins the video as an employ in an office purportedly from the 1970s with an inappropriate boss. Musgraves's character fantasizes about telling off her annoying co-workers and escaping to be with friends, resulting in surrealist daydreams involving a Japanese karaoke bar and an eventual departure from the office atop a white horse. The video's style and themes have been likened to the popular 1980 film, 9 to 5.

== Live performances ==
Musgraves performed "High Horse" on The Ellen DeGeneres Show as part of her appearance on the April 3, 2018 episode. She performed both "High Horse" and "Slow Burn" as the musical guest on the May 13, 2018 episode of Saturday Night Live. On February 15, 2019, Musgraves brought Trinity The Tuck and Monét X Change on stage with her during a performance of "High Horse"; these guests were the then-recently-crowned winners of the fourth season of RuPaul's Drag Race All Stars, on which season she served as a guest judge.

== Track listings ==
Remix EP
No.	Title	Length
1.	"High Horse" (Kue remix)	4:12
2.	"High Horse" (Violents remix)	3:41
Total length:		7:53

- Note: The track listing for 10" vinyl release of the "High Horse" remixes is identical except that track one is on Side A and track two is on Side B.

== Charts ==
Chart (2018)	Peak position
Belgium (Ultratip Bubbling Under Flanders)	8
US Adult Pop Airplay (Billboard)	39
US Hot Country Songs (Billboard)	36

== Certifications ==
Region	Certification	Certified units/sales
United States (RIAA)	Platinum	1,000,000^{‡}
^{‡} Sales+streaming figures based on certification alone.

== Release history ==
Country	Date	Format	Version	Label	Ref.
Various	March 22, 2018	Digital download; streaming	Original	MCA Nashville	
United States	June 25, 2018	Hot adult contemporary	Original	MCA Nashville	
Various	July 3, 2018	Digital download; streaming	Remixes	MCA Nashville	
Various	November 23, 2018	10" vinyl	Remixes	MCA Nashville	
