= Rainbow (Kacey Musgraves song) =

Single by Kacey Musgraves

from the album Golden Hour
- Released: February 11, 2019
- Length: 3:34
- Label: MCA Nashville
- Songwriters: Kacey Musgraves; Natalie Hemby; Shane McAnally
- Producers: Ian Fitchuk; Daniel Tashian; Kacey Musgraves

Kacey Musgraves singles chronology
"High Horse" (2018)	"Rainbow" (2019)	"Easy" (remix) (2020)

Music video
- "Rainbow" on YouTube

"Rainbow" is a song recorded by American country music artist Kacey Musgraves. It was released as the fifth and final single from Musgraves' third studio album, Golden Hour (2018) in February 2019. Musgraves co-wrote the song with Shane McAnally and Natalie Hemby. Its release coincided with her performance at the 61st Annual Grammy Awards.

"Rainbow" was nominated for Song of the Year and won Music Video of the Year at the 53rd Annual Country Music Association Awards. It was nominated for Single of the Year at the 55th Academy of Country Music Awards.

== Content ==
"Rainbow" is a piano ballad in the key of E-flat major with a slow tempo of approximately 64 beats per minute. Musgraves' vocals range from G_{3}-E♭_{5}. The song was penned by Musgraves with Shane McAnally and Natalie Hemby six years prior to its release as the closing track on Golden Hour. According to the singer, it began as an encouraging note to herself and transformed into "a message of hope for anyone in the midst of dark times." It holds significance for Musgraves for several reasons, as it was the last song her grandmother heard her write and was played at her funeral, and she also noted that she hoped the song would be an anthem for those facing adversity, such as those in the LGBT community.

== Live performances ==
Musgraves performed "Rainbow" on Late Night with Seth Meyers on June 20, 2018.

She performed the song live on the 61st Annual Grammy Awards on February 10, 2019. During the show, Musgraves won the Grammy for Album of the Year for its parent album Golden Hour, in addition to Best Country Album. For the performance, Musgraves donned a simple white gown and was accompanied by a pianist playing a rainbow piano behind her.

The song was performed on the Together at Home global concert event on April 18, 2020.

== Music video ==
The music video was directed by Hannah Lux Davis (who also directed her "High Horse" music video), and premiered on February 10, 2019, coinciding with her performance on the Grammy Awards. In it, various characters are shown in different rooms of a dimly lit house, including "a single mother taking care of her child, a man facing his alcohol abuse, a young person wrestling with gender identity, and a teenager caught in the middle of a family crisis." Scenes of Musgraves performing the song either accompanying the others or alone are mixed in throughout the video and near the end she is seen sitting on the floor of a room surrounded by lush greenery and flowers as a rainbow appears overhead.

== Commercial performance ==
"Rainbow" debuted at No. 58 on the Billboard Country Airplay chart for the chart dated February 16, 2019. In its second week, it entered the top 40, making it her highest-peaking single since "Keep It to Yourself" in 2014. It also debuted at No. 17 on the Billboard Hot Country Songs chart and at No. 98 on the Billboard Hot 100. On the latter, it became her first song to chart in six years. The song was certified Platinum by the RIAA on November 15, 2023, it has sold 143,000 copies in the United States as of January 2020.

== Charts ==
=== Weekly charts ===
Chart (2019–2020)	Peak position
Canada Country (Billboard)	43
Hot Canadian Digital Songs (Billboard)	12
New Zealand Hot Singles (RMNZ)	29
Scottish Singles Sales (Official Charts)	38
UK Singles Downloads (Official Charts)	50
US Billboard Hot 100	98
US Adult Contemporary (Billboard)	16
US Hot Country Songs (Billboard)	17
US Country Airplay (Billboard)	33

Chart (2021)	Peak position
Australia Digital Song Sales chart (Billboard)	6

=== Year-end charts ===
Chart (2019)	Position
US Adult Contemporary (Billboard)	37
US Hot Country Songs (Billboard)	78

== Certifications ==
Region	Certification	Certified units/sales
Canada (Music Canada)	2× Platinum	160,000^{‡}
New Zealand (RMNZ)	Gold	15,000^{‡}
United States (RIAA)	2× Platinum	2,000,000^{‡}
^{‡} Sales+streaming figures based on certification alone.
