= Space Cowboy (Kacey Musgraves song) =

2018 single by Kacey Musgraves

- Spotify Exclusive Golden Hour 7 (Vinyl, 7", Single, Limited Edition, White) - Side 1

Single by Kacey Musgraves

from the album Golden Hour
- A-side: "Butterflies" (double A-side)
- Released: February 23, 2018
- Recorded: 2018
- Genre: Country
- Length: 3:36
- Label: MCA Nashville
- Songwriters: Kacey Musgraves; Luke Laird; Shane McAnally
- Producers: Ian Fitchuk; Daniel Tashian; Kacey Musgraves

Kacey Musgraves singles chronology
"Dime Store Cowgirl" (2015)	"Space Cowboy" / "Butterflies" (2018)	"High Horse" (2018)

Music video
- "Space Cowboy" on YouTube

"Space Cowboy" is a song by American country singer and songwriter Kacey Musgraves, released as a single from her fourth studio album Golden Hour on February 23, 2018.

== Background ==
In February 2018, Musgraves posted a photo with the caption: "One day I was out at the barn watching this stallion charging powerfully from one end of the arena to the other, bucking and galloping at full speed all alone. Though I was 'safe' on the other side of the arena wall, it kinda scared me when he came flying toward me..barely stopping in time. My riding teacher saw him coming at me and yelled at me to move away. I said 'I'm fine! The gate is closed!' to which she said, 'Girl – when they wanna go they will go…there ain't no point in even shuttin' the gate.' It really made a mark on me when she said that and I wrote it down. Space Cowboy came a couple days after with Shane McAnally and Luke Laird ✨Make peace with what doesn't belong. You'll find something better."

== Critical reception ==
Chris DeVille from Stereogum wrote, "The melody is so gorgeously wistful, the wordplay so subtly pristine, the heartache so profound. Also, given that it actually sounds like a country song floating through outer space, we all ought to stand up and applaud the levels of compositional genius."

== Commercial performance ==
On March 10, 2018, "Space Cowboy" peaked at number 30 on the Billboard Hot Country Songs chart. The song spent eight weeks on the chart.

On August 3, 2020, the single was certified gold by the Recording Industry Association of America (RIAA) for combined sales and streaming data of over 500,000 units in the United States.

== Composition ==
"Space Cowboy" is originally in the key of D-flat major, with a tempo of 117 beats per minute. Written in common time, Musgraves vocal range spans from A_{3} to C♯_{5} during the song. Musgraves is saying that she is "okay" with her significant other leaving for some time. She recognizes the fact that they had their good times together, but it is time to move on because it is the best for the both of them. He is claiming he needs space, and she is willing to give it to him because their love has "faded".

== Live performances ==
Musgraves performed the song for the first time on The Tonight Show Starring Jimmy Fallon. She also performed the single on The Ellen DeGeneres Show.

== Music video ==
A music video for the single "Space Cowboy" was released on April 30, 2018. Rolling Stone described it as: "Filmed in Mexico City by director Courtney Phillips, the cinematic video tells its story through color and shadow while Musgraves' wounded ballad slowly transforms into an empowering anthem. Her post-romance world is hazy and clouded at first, confined to empty rooms with broken windows while her ex gallops through a tropical village. But the power dynamic soon shifts, with golden rays of morning sun shining down on Musgraves and black clouds gathering over her now-disillusioned cowboy." The video has over seven million views on YouTube.

== Credits and personnel ==
Credits adapted from Genius.

- Songwriting: Kacey Musgraves, Luke Laird, and Shane McAnally
- Mixing: Shawn Everett
- Acoustic guitar: Todd Lombardo and Daniel Tashian
- Bass: Daniel Tashian
- Keyboards: Daniel Tashian and Ian Fitchuk
- Piano: Ian Fitchuk
- Drums and percussion: Ian Fitchuk

== Cover versions ==
Chevel Shepherd covered the song on The Voice's Top 11 Performances in 2018.

== Accolades ==
Awards
Year	Organization	Award	Result	Ref.
2019	Grammy Awards	Best Country Song	Won	
2019	ACM Awards	Song of the Year	Nominated	
2019	CMT Music Awards	Female Video of the Year	Nominated	

== Charts ==
Chart performance for "Space Cowboy"
Chart (2018)	Peak position
US Hot Country Songs (Billboard)	30

== Certifications ==
Region	Certification	Certified units/sales
United States (RIAA)	Platinum	1,000,000^{‡}
^{‡} Sales+streaming figures based on certification alone.
