= Butterflies (Kacey Musgraves song) =

- Spotify Exclusive Golden Hour 7 (Vinyl, 7", Single, Limited Edition, White) - Side 2

Single by Kacey Musgraves

from the album Golden Hour
- A-side: "Space Cowboy" (double A-side)
- Written: 2016
- Released: February 23, 2018
- Genre: Country pop; pop; disco
- Length: 3:39
- Label: MCA Nashville
- Songwriters: Luke Laird; Natalie Hemby; Kacey Musgraves
- Producers: Daniel Tashian; Ian Fitchuk; Kacey Musgraves

Kacey Musgraves singles chronology
"Dime Store Cowgirl" (2015)	"Space Cowboy" / "Butterflies" (2018)	"High Horse" (2018)

Music video
- "Butterflies" on YouTube

"Butterflies" is a song by American country singer–songwriter Kacey Musgraves from her fourth studio album, Golden Hour (2018). It was released on February 23, 2018 alongside "Space Cowboy" as the second single from the album through MCA Nashville Records. Musgraves wrote the song with Luke Laird and Natalie Hemby, and produced it alongside Daniel Tashian and Ian Fitchuk. According to Musgraves, "Butterflies" was co-written with Shane McAnally; however, he was not credited as one of its songwriters in the album's liner notes.

== Composition ==
A "genre-defying" song described as country pop, pop, and disco with a "reggae-fied twang", "Butterflies" departs from the lyrical cynicism expressed in Musgraves' previous songs. With lyrics "[representing] those feelings that you have when you're first meeting somebody and you fall in love".

== Background ==
The song was written in early 2016 shortly after Musgraves had met singer–songwriter Ruston Kelly. The pair were married in 2017 before filing for divorce three years later.

== Critical reception ==
Rolling Stone compared the "earnest" lyrics of "Butterflies" to Taylor Swift's work from Fearless (2008). NPR compared its sound to Little Big Town, with its production "stepping easily beyond any genre category".

== Live performance ==
Musgraves first performed "Butterflies" on January 21, 2017 on the radio show A Prairie Home Companion. In 2018, Musgraves performed the song on Today in March, Austin City Limits in November, and at the 13th Billboard Women in Music event in December. In April 2018, Musgraves recorded an acoustic performance of the song in London to serve as one of the original videos for the Hot Country playlist on Spotify.

== Music video ==
The music video for "Butterflies", like the clip for "Space Cowboy", was directed by Courtney Phillips and shot in Mexico City. It was released on May 4, 2018 and shows Musgraves walking around a city at night.

== Accolades ==
"Butterflies" won the Grammy Award for Best Country Solo Performance at the 61st annual awards ceremony in 2019.

== Chart performance ==
On Billboard's weekly charts, the song peaked at number 32 on the Hot Country Songs chart and number 56 on the Country Airplay chart, spending two weeks on the latter.

== Cover versions ==
Rock band Hawthorne Heights covered "Butterflies" for their two-track project Dads of Sad (2019); Musgraves reacted positively to the emo cover. The song was performed by contestant Cali Wilson on the 17th season of the American music competition series The Voice.

== Credits and personnel ==
Credits adapted from the liner notes of Golden Hour.

- Luke Laird – songwriting
- Natalie Hemby – songwriting
- Kacey Musgraves – songwriting, production, acoustic guitar
- Ian Fitchuk – production, drums, Juno 60, piano
- Daniel Tashian – production, bass guitar, baritone guitar
- Todd Lombardo – electric guitar, acoustic guitar, banjo
- Russ Pahl – pedal steel guitar
- Serban Ghenea – mixing
- John Hanes – engineering for mixing
- Craig Alvin – recording
- Greg Calbi – mastering
- Steve Fallone – mastering

== Charts ==
Chart performance for "Butterflies"
Chart (2018)	Peak position
US Hot Country Songs (Billboard)	32
US Country Airplay (Billboard)	56

== Certifications ==
Certifications for "Butterflies"
Region	Certification	Certified units/sales
Canada (Music Canada)	Platinum	80,000^{‡}
New Zealand (RMNZ)	Gold	15,000^{‡}
United States (RIAA)	Platinum	1,000,000^{‡}
^{‡} Sales+streaming figures based on certification alone.
