= Largo desolato =

Play written by Václav Havel

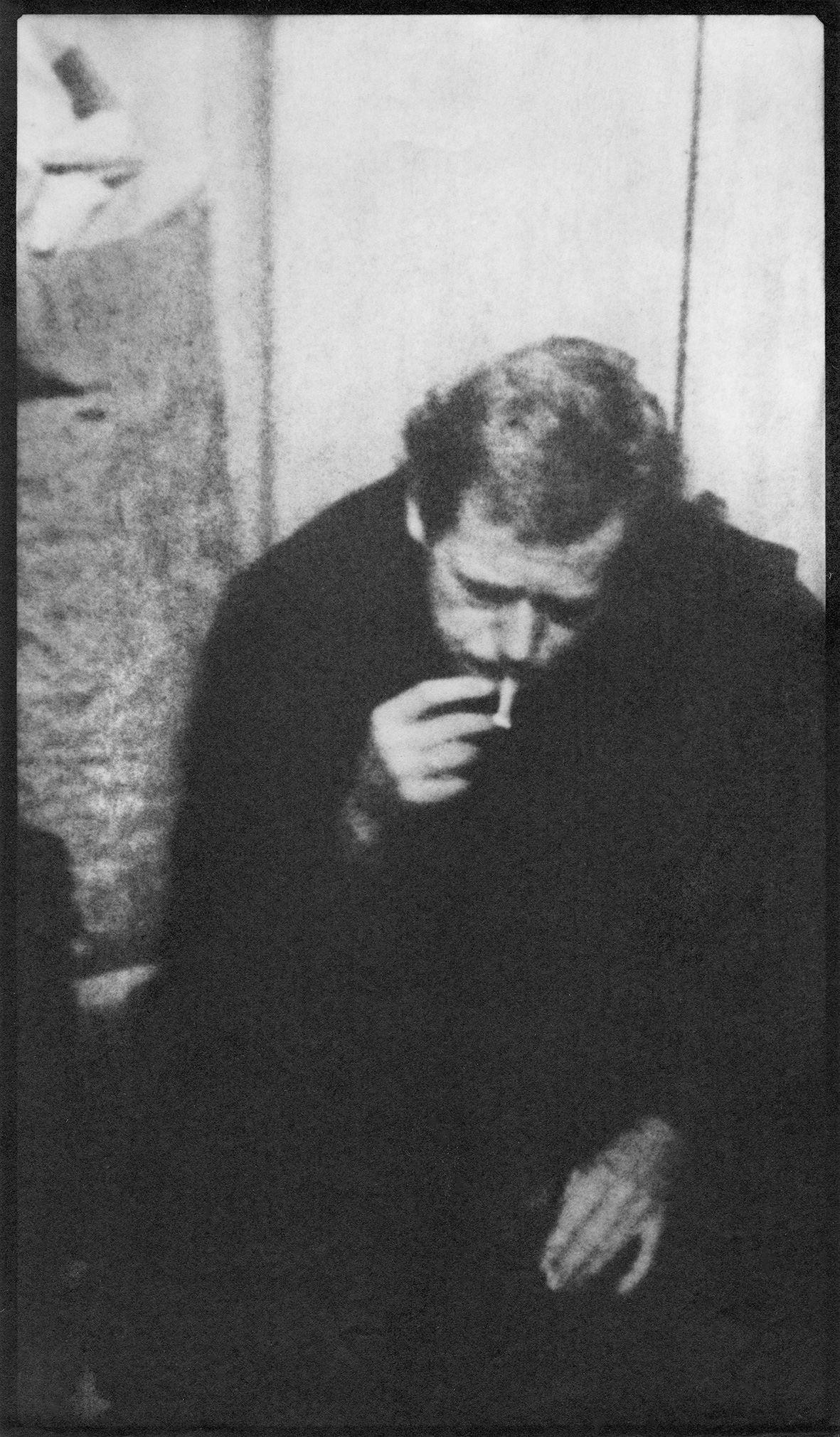
Václav Havel

Largo Desolato is a semi-autobiographical play by Václav Havel about a political dissident, Leopold Nettles (originally in Czech Kopřiva), who fears being sent to prison for his writing. Leopold faces mounting pressure from his friends, admirers and colleagues; these pressures in addition to ongoing state surveillance have made him incapable of writing anything further. The play is dedicated to Czech-born playwright Tom Stoppard, who translated the play into English for its world premiere in Bristol, England, in 1986.

Havel is reported to have written this play in the days following his release from prison in 1984.

Largo Desolato was listed in The Telegraph as one of the 15 greatest plays of all time.

== Characters ==
Leopold Nettles (Kopřiva) – a professor, philosopher and author whose writing made him a populist hero; however, continued state surveillance and the fear of imminent imprisonment has rendered him an increasingly neurotic recluse.

Edward and Bertram – Leopold's friends and/or colleagues, growing increasingly concerned with his soundness of body and mind.

Suzana – Leopold's housemate, or possibly his wife; their relationship is never specifically stated. It is implied that she is involved romantically with Edward.

Lucy – Leopold's lover, frustrated at his inability to open himself emotionally or acknowledge their relationship publicly.

Marguerite – a philosophy student who goes to Leopold for counsel

Two Chaps – Government agents who offer Leopold his freedom if he repudiates his writing

Two Sidneys – workers from the local paper mill, meant to represent the opinions of the common man

Two Men - mute enforcers for the two Chaps

In the original Bristol production, the actors who played the two Chaps also played the two Sidneys. This was not Havel's original intention, but he did give consent.

== Plot ==
Leopold Nettles, a dissident political writer and philosopher, lives under constant state surveillance and fears being sent to prison at any moment. He has become increasingly reclusive, neurotic, dependent on drugs and alcohol, and incapable of writing further.

In addition to political pressure, he also faces pressure from friends and admirers: his housemate (and possible spouse) Suzana who has lost all patience and sympathy with him, his colleagues Edward and Bertram who are almost absurdly concerned with his bodily and mental functions, his lover Lucy who is increasingly frustrated with his emotional unavailability, and two paper mill laborers who bring him paper and stolen personnel files naively thinking it will inspire him to write.

Late one night he is visited by two government agents ("Chaps") who offer to drop all charges if he signs a paper claiming he isn't the author of the offending works. He asks for and is granted time to consider, but in the interim his neuroses only heighten and he estranges himself further from his colleagues. When the chaps return (while he is awkwardly seducing an admiring student, Marguerite), Leopold finally resolves that he would rather face prison than repudiate his writing. They then inform him that the offer has been deemed unnecessary ("for the time being," they add) as his neuroses have effectively neutralized him as a further threat to the state. He is left alone to deteriorate further.

Leopold's state of mind is textually represented by the constant repetition of dialogue and action throughout the play, suggesting a circular 'whirlpool' effect.

== Literature ==
- Havel, Václav. Largo Desolato. Faber and Faber, 1989.
