= Jason Owen (talent manager) =

American music manager

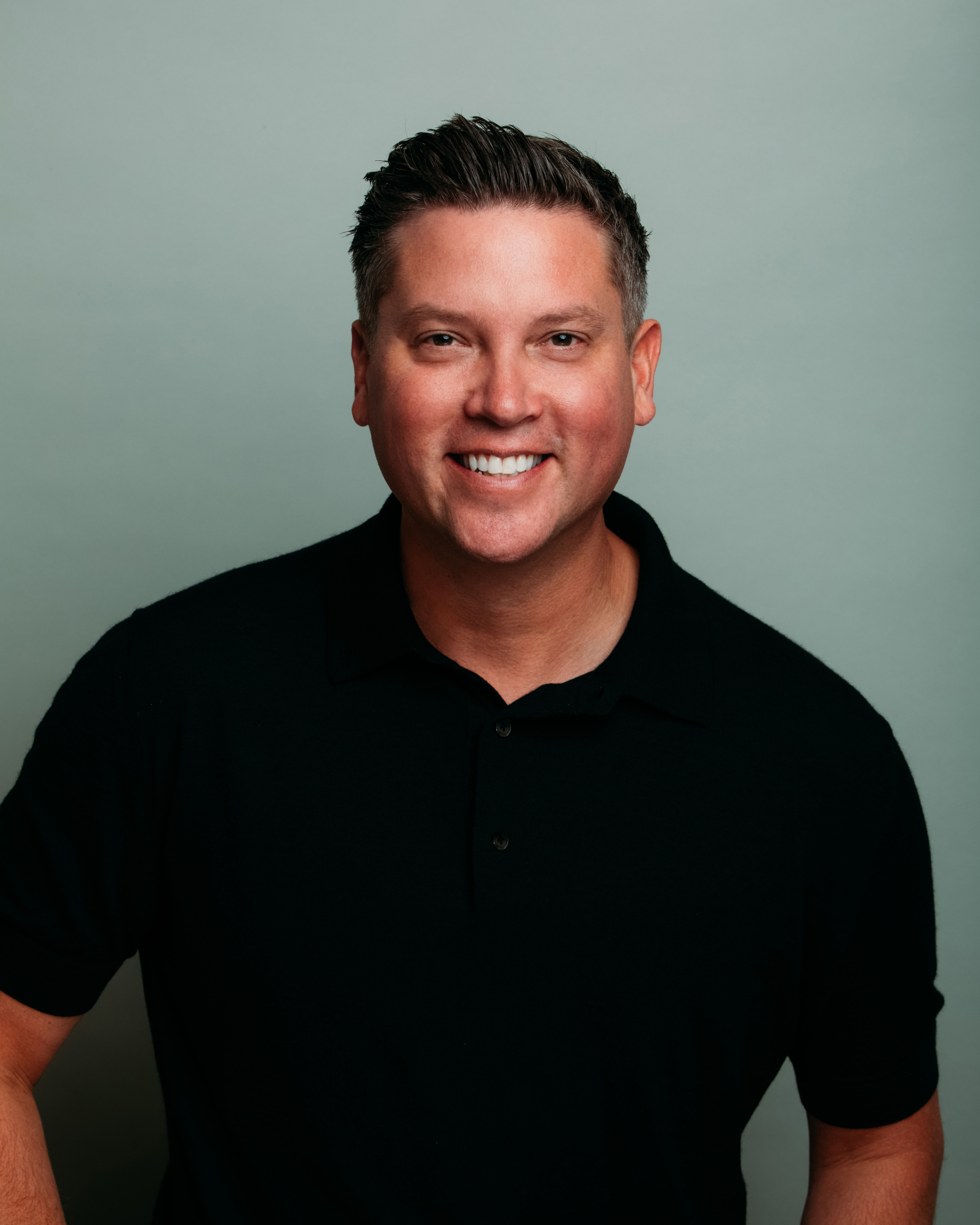

Background information
- Born: 1976 or 1977 (age 49–50); Monticello, Arkansas, United States
- Genres: Country, Pop
- Occupations: Talent manager, Executive Producer

Jason Owen (born 1976 or 1977), is an American music manager, record executive, and Tony-nominated producer best known for launching artist management company Sandbox Entertainment and leading the careers of Shania Twain, Kacey Musgraves, Faith Hill, Little Big Town, Dan+Shay, and Kelsea Ballerini among others. In 2015, Owen was named one of Billboard's “40 Under 40: Music’s Top Young Power Players”, and has since been included twice in the trade magazine's "Power 100" industry ranking.

== Early life ==
Owen grew up in Monticello, Arkansas, where his father ran a chemical distribution company. He was inspired by the first concert he attended by The Judds at an early age, and was a fan of Madonna, Cher, Bette Midler, and Dolly Parton during his childhood. He attended college at the University of Arkansas.

== Career ==
=== Film and television industry ===
After graduating from University of Arkansas, Owen held several roles within the film and television industry in Los Angeles and New York. He first worked for New Line Cinema and Fine Line Features in a publicity and talent relations position before moving to Spelling Entertainment, where he worked for television producer Aaron Spelling as manager of talent relations. He also served as director of marketing and talent relations for Columbia TriStar Television, where he oversaw press strategies for shows including Dawson's Creek, Ricki Lake, and The Young and the Restless.

=== Universal Music Nashville ===
Owen joined Universal Music Group Nashville, Universal Music Group's country music subsidiary, in 2002. In 2005 he was promoted from vice president to senior vice president of artist, media relations, and creative services, which involved responsibilities with record labels DreamWorks Nashville, MCA Nashville, and Mercury Nashville. In this Role, Owen helped launch careers for artists such as Sugarland, Julianne Hough, and Josh Turner. He then rose to senior vice president of artist development and marketing in March 2009, where he developed campaigns for Shania Twain, George Strait, Lee Ann Womack, and Reba McEntire.

=== Sandbox Entertainment ===
In August 2010, Owen stepped down from his role at Universal Music Nashville to launch artist management company Sandbox Entertainment. He opened the company in September 2010, with Shania Twain as his first management client after working with her for 8 years with Universal. Owen remained connected to Universal Music Nashville by serving in a consultancy role with then chairman & CEO Luke Lewis. Sandbox was initially formed with a publicity, marketing, and creative focus, but has since grown to include a touring division and a digital marketing department. Since opening its doors, Sandbox and Owen have added a number of formidable country music acts to its roster including Kacey Musgraves, Little Big Town, Faith Hill, Dan + Shay (co-managed by Scooter Braun), Midland, and Kelsea Ballerini.

In 2017, Owen arranged for Kacey Musgraves to open for Harry Styles on 20 dates of his US his summer tour. He also established the first yearlong residency at the Ryman Auditorium dubbed "Little Big Town at the Mother Church", during which Little Big Town played a number of shows at the celebrated venue and sold more than 23,000 tickets in total.

In 2018, Owen was named Executive of the Year on Billboard Magazine's 2018 Country Power Players List, ranking "movers, shakers, and influencers" within country music.

In 2019, Owen's clients Kacey Musgraves and Dan + Shay collectively won 5 awards at the Grammys, including all country music categories as well as Album of the Year for Musgraves. Variety named Owen their Hitmakers Manager of the Year in December.

Owen's executive producer credits include the Amazon Prime Video holiday variety special The Kacey Musgraves Show, the syndicated daytime show Pickler & Ben, the Showtime tour documentary Tim & Faith: Soul2Soul, the Food Network's Kimberly’s Simply Southern, the ABC concert special Shania: Still the One Live from Vegas,.. Fox TV series; Monarch, starring Susan Sarandon, set in the world of country music. Love, Tom; a storytelling documentary on Paramount+, CMT's A River of Time: Naomi Judd Memorial, and COAL MINER’S DAUGHTER: A celebration of the life & music of LORETTA LYNN. Owen is also a producer of the Tony-nominated broadway musical, Shucked.

Additionally, he has been an Executive Producer for 2021 and 2022, CMT Music Awards.

=== Monument Records ===
In 2017, Owen partnered with award-winning producer and songwriter Shane McAnally to revive Monument Records, an imprint of Sony Music Entertainment known in its past iterations for signing Kris Kristofferson, Dolly Parton, Roy Orbison, Willie Nelson, and the Dixie Chicks. Their first signings included Caitlyn Smith and Walker Hayes, but their roster has since grown to include Brandon Ratcliff, Teddy Robb, Anna Moon, and a podcast with music industry veterans Susan Nadler and Evelyn Shriver, coined “Shady Ladies of Music City”. Monument Records closed in April 2025.

== Awards and nominations ==
Year	Ceremony	Nominated work	Category	Result
2013	Daytime Emmy Awards	"Good Afternoon" from Good Afternoon America	Outstanding Original Song	Won
2023	Tony Awards	Shucked	Best Musical	Nominated

== Personal life ==
Owen is openly gay and is married to Sam Easley, owner of Nashville based artist merchandising company Crown Merchandise. Together they have three children. He and his husband are avid art collectors, and in May 2018 together they guest-curated a photography exhibition titled "Vestige" at David Lusk Gallery in Nashville showcasing works from their photography collection.
