= Golden Hour (Kacey Musgraves album) =

2018 studio album by Kacey Musgraves

Studio album by Kacey Musgraves
- Released: March 30, 2018
- Recorded: January–April 2017
- Studios: Big Green Barn; Sound Emporium (Nashville, Tennessee); House of Blues; Great Gazoo Reading Room; Royal Plum; (Nashville)
- Genre: Country pop
- Length: 45:44
- Label: MCA Nashville
- Producers: Ian Fitchuk; Daniel Tashian; Kacey Musgraves

Kacey Musgraves chronology
A Very Kacey Christmas (2016)	Golden Hour (2018)	The Kacey Musgraves Christmas Show (2019)

Singles from Golden Hour
- 1. "Space Cowboy" Released: February 23, 2018; 2. "Butterflies" Released: February 23, 2018; 3. "High Horse" Released: June 25, 2018; 4. "Slow Burn" Released: October 16, 2018; 5. "Rainbow" Released: February 11, 2019

Golden Hour is the fourth studio album by American country music singer and songwriter Kacey Musgraves, released on March 30, 2018, through MCA Nashville. Musgraves co-wrote all 13 tracks and co-produced the album with Daniel Tashian and Ian Fitchuk. A country pop record, Golden Hour also contains elements of disco, electropop, electronica, and yacht rock.

Golden Hour debuted at number four on the US Billboard 200. Receiving widespread critical acclaim, the album and its songs won in all four of their nominated categories at the 61st Grammy Awards, including Album of the Year and Best Country Album. The album's first two singles also won awards: "Butterflies" for Best Country Solo Performance and "Space Cowboy" for Best Country Song. Golden Hour also won Album of the Year at the 52nd Annual Country Music Association Awards. In 2020, Golden Hour was ranked at 270 on Rolling Stone's 500 Greatest Albums of All Time list.

== Background and recording ==
Musgraves wrote and recorded most of the songs from the album throughout 2017. When asked about the writing process, she said, "I have a lot more love songs this time around, and I've never been one to write a love song and really feel it." She continued: "That probably sounds like the most depressing thing ever. [But] I'm coming off getting married and being in this golden hour of my personal life, where all these things are finally coming to fruition. I found myself inspired to write about this person and all these things he brought out in me that weren't there before." Pieces of the album were recorded in a studio above a horse stable owned by musician Sheryl Crow.

In a 2018 interview with Rolling Stone, Musgraves discussed being under the influence of LSD when composing the songs "Mother" and "Slow Burn" and how it helped her creative process; "I'm not going to tell anybody to run out and do anything that wouldn't be suitable for their mind or their lifestyle, but it did have positive effects for me."

== Promotion and packaging ==
On March 10, 2018, Musgraves announced the Oh, What a World: Tour in support of the album while performing at the Country to Country music festival in London. The first twelve dates of the tour were announced on March 12, through Musgraves stating on social media that tour dates in other countries would eventually be added. The tour began on October 13 in Oslo, Norway. Musgraves announced a second leg of the tour, titled the "Oh, What a World: Tour II", in February 2019.

Musgraves' sister Kelly Christine Sutton took the cover photo for Golden Hour over a two-day photo shoot in and around their hometown of Golden, Texas. Sutton, who also is credited with designing the album's packaging, has previously worked with Musgraves for all of her albums' artwork. When considering the cover photo, Sutton recalls Kacey "wanted to use this paper fan, and we are usually on the same page with ideas, but I couldn't picture it. We went out into this wide open field. We needed one with no trees, so there was sky only. Almost immediately after we reviewed the photos, we just knew we had it."

== Critical reception ==
Professional ratings
Aggregate scores
Source	Rating
AnyDecentMusic?	8.1/10
Metacritic	89/100
Review scores
Source	Rating
AllMusic	5/5 stars
Chicago Tribune	3/4 stars
Consequence of Sound	A−
The Guardian	5/5 stars
The Independent	5/5 stars
Pitchfork	8.7/10
Rolling Stone	4/5 stars
The Times	4/5 stars
Uncut	7/10
Vice (Expert Witness)	B+

Golden Hour received rave reviews from music critics. At Metacritic, which assigns a normalized rating out of 100 to reviews from mainstream critics, the album has an average score of 89, based on 18 reviews, indicating "universal acclaim". Stephen Thomas Erlewine of AllMusic rated the album five out of five stars and called it "warm and enveloping, pitched halfway between heartbreak and healing—but (it) lingers in the mind because the songs are so sharp, buttressed by long, loping melodies and Musgraves' affectless soul baring." Writing for The Independent and rating the album a perfect 5 out of 5, Roisin O'Connor states the album is "a reminder that sometimes – often, if you're looking in the right places – life is beautiful." Additionally, it was a Spin "Essential" and of the genre-bending songs on the album, reviewer Katherine St. Asaph calls it "not classicist, but perhaps it might be classic." The album was rated number one by the BBC poll of polls, a compilation of best-of-the-year lists across 35 music reviewers, on a list of the best albums of 2018. The album also placed number one in The Village Voice's Pazz & Jop critics' poll for 2018.

== Commercial performance ==
Golden Hour debuted at number four on the US Billboard 200 and at number one on the Top Country Albums chart with 49,000 album-equivalent units, with 39,000 of that figure being pure album sales in its first week. It marks Musgraves’ third number one on the US Top Country Albums chart. It also debuted at number one on the Americana/Folk Albums chart. In the chart week following the 61st Grammy Awards, where Golden Hour won Album of the Year, the album returned to the top ten, climbing to number nine on the chart, selling 35,000 copies. In February 2019, the album has reached 310,000 in album-equivalent units sold. On June 28, 2019, the album was certified gold by the Recording Industry Association of America (RIAA) for combined sales and album-equivalent units of over 500,000 units. As of February 2020, the album has sold 735,000 units in the United States and was certified Platinum on May 7, 2021.

In the United Kingdom, Golden Hour debuted at number six on the official UK Albums Chart and at number one on the UK Country Albums chart. It marks Musgraves' first top ten album in the UK.

== Track listing ==
Credits adapted from liner notes.

All tracks are produced by Daniel Tashian, Ian Fitchuk, and Kacey Musgraves.

Golden Hour track listing
No.	Title	Writer(s)	Length
1.	"Slow Burn"	Kacey Musgraves; Daniel Tashian; Ian Fitchuk	4:06
2.	"Lonely Weekend"	Musgraves; Tashian; Fitchuk	3:46
3.	"Butterflies"	Musgraves; Luke Laird; Natalie Hemby	3:39
4.	"Oh, What a World"	Musgraves; Tashian; Fitchuk	4:01
5.	"Mother"	Musgraves; Tashian; Fitchuk	1:18
6.	"Love Is a Wild Thing"	Musgraves; Tashian; Fitchuk	4:16
7.	"Space Cowboy"	Musgraves; Laird; Shane McAnally	3:36
8.	"Happy & Sad"	Musgraves; Tashian; Fitchuk	4:03
9.	"Velvet Elvis"	Musgraves; Hemby; Luke Dick	2:34
10.	"Wonder Woman"	Musgraves; Jesse Frasure; Hillary Lindsey; Amy Wadge	4:00
11.	"High Horse"	Musgraves; Tommy Schleiter; Trent Dabbs	3:33
12.	"Golden Hour"	Musgraves; Tashian; Fitchuk	3:18
13.	"Rainbow"	Musgraves; Hemby; McAnally	3:34
Total length:			45:44

Golden Hour – Japan Exclusive Edition
No.	Title	Writer(s)	Length
14.	"Merry Go 'Round"	Musgraves; McAnally; Osborne	3:28
15.	"Follow Your Arrow"	Musgraves; McAnally; Brandy Clark	3:21
16.	"High Horse" (Violents Remix)	Musgraves; Schleiter; Dabbs	3:43
Total length:			56:11

== Personnel ==
Credits adapted from liner notes.

Instrumentation

- Daniel Tashian – keyboards (1, 2, 4, 7, 8, 11), bass guitar (1, 3, 7, 10, 12), background vocals (1, 2, 4, 6–9, 12), Fender Stratocaster (2, 8, 9), electric guitar (2, 4, 6, 8, 10, 11), baritone guitar (solo on 3, 12), acoustic guitar (4, 6, 7, 11), celeste (6), banjo (6), electric mandolin (8), programming (8), vibraphone (9), MIDI strings (9), classical guitar (9), Elektron sampler (10), Rhodes (10)
- Todd Lombardo – acoustic guitar (1–4, 6–12), electric guitar (1, 3, 6, 8, 11, 12), banjo (1, 3, 11), high strung acoustic guitar (2), baritone guitar (8, 12), slide guitar (8), classical guitar (9, 11)
- Ian Fitchuk – drums (1–4, 6–12), keyboards (1, 2, 4, 6–8, 10, 11), percussion (2, 4, 6–11), bass guitar (2, 4, 6, 8, 9, 11), Roland Juno-60 (3, 12), piano (3, 5, 7, 8, 10–13), programming (4, 8), vocoder (4), banjo (4), background vocals (4), Wurlitzer (8), electric guitar (9, 11), synth bass (10, 11)
- David Davidson – violin (1, 8, 11), viola (1, 8, 11)
- Carole Rabinowitz – cello (1, 8, 11)
- Kacey Musgraves – lead vocals (1–13), acoustic guitar (3, 9, 12)
- Russ Pahl – pedal steel guitar (3, 8, 12)
- Justin Schipper – pedal steel guitar (4)
- Dan Dugmore – pedal steel guitar (6, 7)
- Shawn Everett – "dolphin magic" (8)
- Kyle Ryan – electric guitar (9)

Technical

- Craig Alvin – recording, mixing (5, 13)
- Alberto Vaz – recording assistance
- Zack Pancoast – recording assistance
- Shawn Everett – mixing (1, 2, 4, 6–10, 12)
- Ivan Wayman – mixing assistance (1, 2, 4, 6–10, 12)
- Serban Ghenea – mixing (3, 11)
- John Hanes – engineering for mix (3, 11)
- Gena Johnson – production coordination
- Bobby Shin – strings recording
- Jordan Lehning – editing
- Greg Calbi – mastering
- Steve Fallone – mastering

Artwork

- Kelly Christine Sutton – art direction, photography, design
- Kacey Musgraves – art direction

== Charts ==
=== Weekly charts ===
Chart (2018)	Peak position
Australian Albums (ARIA)	25
Belgian Albums (Ultratop Flanders)	111
Canadian Albums (Billboard)	11
Dutch Albums (Album Top 100)	105
Irish Albums (IRMA)	27
New Zealand Heatseeker Albums (RMNZ)	2
Norwegian Albums (VG-lista)	15
Scottish Albums (Official Charts)	3
Swiss Albums (Schweizer Hitparade)	43
UK Albums (Official Charts)	6
UK Country Albums (Official Charts)	1
US Billboard 200	4
US Americana/Folk Albums (Billboard)	1
US Top Country Albums (Billboard)	1

=== Year-end charts ===
Chart (2018)	Position
US Folk Albums (Billboard)	8
US Top Country Albums (Billboard)	34
US Top Current Albums (Billboard)	32

Chart (2019)	Position
US Billboard 200	86
US Folk Albums (Billboard)	2
US Top Country Albums (Billboard)	7

Chart (2020)	Position
US Billboard 200	191
US Folk Albums (Billboard)	2
US Top Country Albums (Billboard)	18

Chart (2021)	Position
US Folk Albums (Billboard)	6
US Top Country Albums (Billboard)	41

Chart (2022)	Position
US Top Country Albums (Billboard)	72

== Accolades ==
At the 61st Annual Grammy Awards in 2019, Golden Hour won Album of the Year and Best Country Album. It became the sixth country album to win Album of the Year, the first since Fearless by Taylor Swift in 2010. Its songs, "Space Cowboy" and "Butterflies", won Best Country Song and Best Country Solo Performance, respectively.

Awards
Association	Year	Category	Result
CMA Awards	2018	Album of the Year	Won
Apple Music	2018	Album of the Year	Won
Grammy Awards	2019	Album of the Year	Won
Grammy Awards	2019	Best Country Album	Won
ACM Awards	2019	Album of the Year	Won
CMT Music Awards	2019	Video of the Year (for "Rainbow")	Nominated
CMT Music Awards	2019	Female Video of the Year (for "Space Cowboy")	Nominated
CMA Awards	2019	Song of the Year (for "Rainbow")	Nominated
CMA Awards	2019	Music Video of the Year (for "Rainbow")	Won
ACM Awards	2019	Single of the Year (for "Rainbow")	Nominated

Year-end lists
Publication	Rank	List
AllMusic	N/A	The Best Albums of 2018
American Songwriter	1	Top 25 Albums of 2018
Associated Press	2	Top 10 Albums of 2018
Apple	1	The Best Album of 2018
Billboard	3	The 50 Best Albums of 2018: Critics' Picks
Complex	36	The 50 Best Albums of 2018
Consequence of Sound	9	The 50 Best Albums of 2018
Entertainment Weekly	1	The 20 Best Albums of 2018
The Independent	4	The 40 Best Albums of 2018
Noisey	2	The 100 Best Albums of 2018
NPR Music	3	The 50 Best Albums of 2018
Paste	44	The 50 Best Albums of 2018
People	1	Top 10 Albums of 2018
Pitchfork	2	The 50 Best Albums of 2018
PopMatters	2	The 70 Best Albums of 2018
Rolling Stone	2	The 50 Best Albums of 2018
Sputnikmusic	1	Top 50 Albums of 2018
Stereogum	1	The 50 Best Albums of 2018
Taste of Country	1	The 10 Best Country Albums of 2018
Idolator	3	The 25 Best Albums Of 2018
Time	8	The 10 Best Albums of 2018
Uncut	73	The 75 Best Albums of 2018
Uproxx	2	The 50 Best Albums of 2018
Uproxx	1	Uproxx Music Critics Poll: Albums
The Village Voice	1	Pazz & Jop: The Top 100 Albums of 2018
Vulture	4	The Best Albums of 2018

Decade-end and All-time lists
Publication	Rank	List
The A.V. Club	27	The 50 Best Albums of the 2010s
Billboard	6	The 100 Greatest Albums of the 2010s
Billboard	3	The 25 Best Country Albums of the 2010s
Cleveland.com	12	100 Greatest Albums of the 2010s
Consequence of Sound	85	The 100 Top Albums of the 2010s
Paste	9	The 100 Best Albums of the 2010s
Pitchfork	23	The 200 Best Albums of the 2010s
Rolling Stone	11	The 100 Best Albums of the 2010s
Rolling Stone	270	The 500 Greatest Albums of All Time
Apple Music	85	100 Best Albums
Uproxx	11	The Best Albums of the 2010s

== Certifications ==
Region	Certification	Certified units/sales
Canada (Music Canada)	Platinum	80,000^{‡}
New Zealand (RMNZ)	Gold	7,500^{‡}
United Kingdom (BPI)	Gold	100,000^{‡}
United States (RIAA)	Platinum	1,000,000^{‡}
^{‡} Sales+streaming figures based on certification alone.

== Release history ==
Region	Date	Format(s)	Label	Ref.
United States	March 30, 2018	CD; digital download; vinyl	MCA Nashville	
Japan	July 4, 2018	CD	Universal Music Japan	
