= Daniel Tashian =

American songwriter, producer, and musician

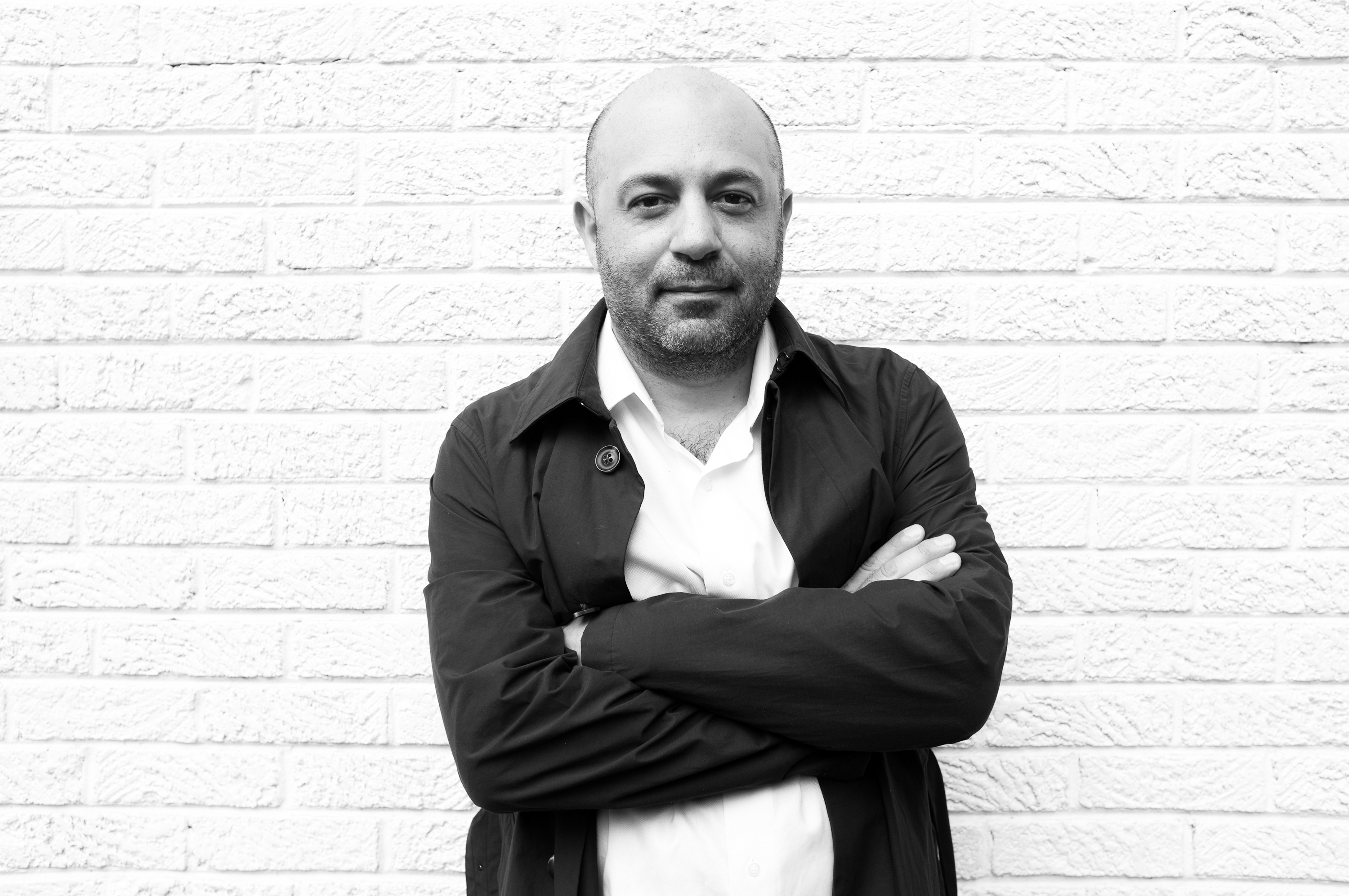

Background information
- Born: Daniel Keyes Tashian; 1974 (age 51–52); Connecticut
- Genre: Folk
- Years active: 1993–present
- Member of: The Silver Seas
- Spouse: Lillie Fish

Daniel Keyes Tashian (born 1974) is an American songwriter, producer, and multi-instrumentalist. He has spent ten years writing and producing for Big Yellow Dog Music.

Tashian's music career began when he was 19 years old and signed his first deal on Elektra Records. His first album was produced by T Bone Burnett, and he also started a band called The Silver Seas (originally called the Bees) in 1999. The success of that band lead them to an appearance on Later... with Jools Holland.

In 2018, he co-produced Kacey Musgraves' critically acclaimed album Golden Hour in addition to co-writing 7 of the album's 13 songs, including "Slow Burn", "Happy and Sad", "Love is a Wild Thing", and the album's title track, "Golden Hour". Tashian received two Grammys, one ACM award, and one CMA award for his work on the album. Other production credits include Tenille Townes' Living Room Worktapes EP, Jessie James Decker's On This Holiday album, and work for artists including A Girl Called Eddy, Trent Dabbs, Emily West, Lily & Madeleine, Lissie, Rainbow Kitten Surprise, and Sad Penny.

Other notable songwriting credits include his first number one song, "Hometown Girl" by Josh Turner, "White Horse" by Tenille Townes, "Good Night" by Billy Currington, and "The Bees" by Lee Ann Womack. He has also had several sync placements in hit TV shows like Pretty Little Liars, Nashville, Reign, and Scorpion (as well as the film Our Idiot Brother). His band, the Silver Seas, also had a song featured on the TV series Breaking Bad.

In 2019, Tashian released I Love Rainy Days, a children's album for which he wrote and produced all the music and painted all associated artwork, following in 2020 with Mr. Moonlight, another children's album. In July 2020, Tashian collaborated with Burt Bacharach on the EP Blue Umbrella.

== Personal life ==
Tashian was born in Connecticut to musician parents who perform as the country and bluegrass duo Barry and Holly Tashian. He and his wife Lillie Fish have three daughters, Tigerlily, Matilda and Tinkerbell.

== Selected songwriting credits ==
Year	Artist	Album	Song	Co-Writers
2008	Lee Ann Womack	Call Me Crazy	The Bees	Natalie Hemby
2009	Mindy Smith	Stupid Love	True Love of Mine	None
2011	Eli Young Band	Life at Best	How Quickly You Forget	Mike Eli, Natalie Hemby
2011	Tim McGraw	Christmas All Over the World	Christmas All Over the World	Troy Verges
2012	Logan Mize	Nobody in Nashville	Ball & Chain	Logan Mize, Bob DiPiero
2012	Logan Mize	Nobody in Nashville	High & Dry	Logan Mize
2012	Logan Mize	Nobody in Nashville	I Remember Everything	Logan Mize, Liz Rose
2012	Love & Theft	Love & Theft	Town Drunk	Natalie Hemby
2012	Erin McCarley	My Stadium Electric	There's No Holding You Down	Erin McCarley
2015	Nashville Cast	If I'm Still Dreaming (feat. Sam Palladio, Clare Bowen & Jonathan Jackson) - Single	If I'm Still Dreaming (feat. Sam Palladio, Clare Bowen & Jonathan Jackson)	Cary Barlowe
2015	Billy Currington	Summer Forever	Good Night (feat. Jessie James Decker)	Rosi Golan, Claire Guerreso
2015	Jill Andrews	The War Inside	Stepping Out	Jill Andrews, Kyle Ryan
2015	Jessie James Decker	This Christmas	Baby! It's Christmas	Jessie James Decker
2016	Martina McBride	Reckless	You & You Alone	Sarah Buxton, Abe Stoklasa
2016	Charles Kelley	The Driver	Dancing Around It	Charles Kelley, Abe Stoklasa
2016	Steve Moakler	Steve Moakler - EP	Jealous Girl	Steve Moakler
2016	Nashville Cast	The Music of Nashville (Original Soundtrack) [Season 4, Vol. 2]	Wild Card (feat. Lennon Stella)	Rosi Golan, Claire Guerreso
2016	Kelleigh Bannen	Cheap Sunglasses - EP	Welcome to the Party	Kelleigh Bannen, Abe Stoklasa
2016	Chris Lane	Stolen Car - Single	Stolen Car	Sarah Archer, Katie Buxton
2017	Josh Turner	Deep South	Hometown Girl	Marc Beeson
2017	Charlie Worsham	Beginning of Things	Call You Up	Abe Stoklasa
2017	Claire Guerreso	Battle Cry - Single	Battle Cry	
2017	Keelan Donovan	Keelan Donovan - EP	Tonight Feels Different	
2017	Keelan Donovan	Keelan Donovan - EP	Touch & Go	
2017	Logan Mize	Come Back Road	All This Night Needs	Matraca Berg, Dave Berg
2017	Logan Mize	Come Back Road	Big City	Troy Verges
2017	Sara Evans	Words	Night Light	Jaida Dreyer
2017	Jessie James Decker	Southern Girl City Lights	Almost Over You	Sarah Burton, Abe Stoklasa
2017	Jessie James Decker	Southern Girl City Lights	Open All Night	Maren Morris, Angelo Petraglia
2018	Lissie	Castles	Best Days	Lissie, Ian Fitchuk
2018	Lissie	Castles	Castles	Lissie, Ian Fitchuk
2018	Kacey Musgraves	Golden Hour	Golden Hour	Kacey Musgraves, Ian Fitchuk
2018	Kacey Musgraves	Golden Hour	Happy & Sad	Kacey Musgraves, Ian Fitchuk
2018	Kacey Musgraves	Golden Hour	Lonely Weekend	Kacey Musgraves, Ian Fitchuk
2018	Kacey Musgraves	Golden Hour	Love is a Wild Thing	Kacey Musgraves, Ian Fitchuk
2018	Kacey Musgraves	Golden Hour	Mother	Kacey Musgraves, Ian Fitchuk
2018	Kacey Musgraves	Golden Hour	Oh, What a World	Kacey Musgraves, Ian Fitchuk
2018	Kacey Musgraves	Golden Hour	Slow Burn	Kacey Musgraves, Ian Fitchuk
2018	Tenille Townes	Living Room Worktapes	Where You Are	Tenille Townes, Keelan Donovan
2018	Tenille Townes	Living Room Worktapes	White Horse	Tenille Townes, Jeremy Spillman
2018	Logan Mize	Come Back Road	Cool Girl	Logan Mize
2018	Logan Mize	From the Vault - EP	I Want You	Troy Verges
2018	Logan Mize	From the Vault - EP	Thinking About You	Troy Verges
2018	Keelan Donovan	Like a Radio - Single	Like a Radio	Keelan Donovan, Abe Stoklasa
2018	Lucie Silvas	E.G.O.	My Old Habits	Lucie Silvas, Keelan Donovan
2018	Jessie James Decker	On This Holiday	Snowlight	Jessie James Decker
2018	Jessie James Decker	On This Holiday	Wonderful Day	Jessie James Decker
2018	Jessie James Decker	On This Holiday	Christmas in Cabo	Jessie James Decker
2019	Daniel Tashian	I Love Rainy Days	Blue Sky	None
2019	Daniel Tashian	I Love Rainy Days	Counting Song	None
2019	Daniel Tashian	I Love Rainy Days	Driving With You	None
2019	Daniel Tashian	I Love Rainy Days	I Love Rainy Days	None
2019	Daniel Tashian	I Love Rainy Days	Little Star	None
2019	Daniel Tashian	I Love Rainy Days	Nightbird	None
2019	Daniel Tashian	I Love Rainy Days	Someone With a Dream	None
2019	Daniel Tashian	I Love Rainy Days	The Letters	None
2019	Daniel Tashian	I Love Rainy Days	Walk Tall	None
2020	Tenille Townes	The Lemonade Stand	Holding Out for the One	Marc Beeson, Tenille Townes
2020			Come As You Are	Marc Beeson, Tenille Townes
2020			The Way You Look Tonight (feat. Keelan Donovan)	Keelan Donovan, Tenille Townes
2020			Find Out	Sacha Skarbek, Tenille Townes
2021	Jade Eagleson	Honkytonk Revival	"Hangover Like You"	John Osborne
2022	Demi Lovato	Holy Fvck	"Feed"	Demi Lovato, Warren "Oak" Felder, Alex Niceforo, Keith "Ten4" Sorrells, Laura Veltz, JT Daly

== Selected production credits ==
Year	Artist	Project	Co-producers
2014	Skyline Motel	Skyline Motel	
2017	Lucie Silvas	"My Old Habits"	
2018	Kacey Musgraves	Golden Hour	Kacey Musgraves, Ian Fitchuk
2018	Tenille Townes	Living Room Worktapes	None
2018	Jessie James Decker	On This Holiday	Jessie James Decker
2019	Lily & Madeleine	"Can't Help the Way I Feel"	Ian Fitchuk
2024	Real Estate (band)	"Daniel"	None
2024	Sarah Jarosz	Polaroid Lovers	None
2024	Rainbow Kitten Surprise	“Love Hate Music Box”	Ela Melo

== Awards ==
Award	Song/Project	Nominated/Won	Category
Grammy	Golden Hour	Won	Album of the Year
Grammy	Golden Hour	Won	Best Country Album
Academy of Country Music	Golden Hour	Won	Album of the Year
Country Music Association	Golden Hour	Won	Album of the Year
BMI Award	Hometown Girl	Won	N/A
