= Kacey Musgraves discography =

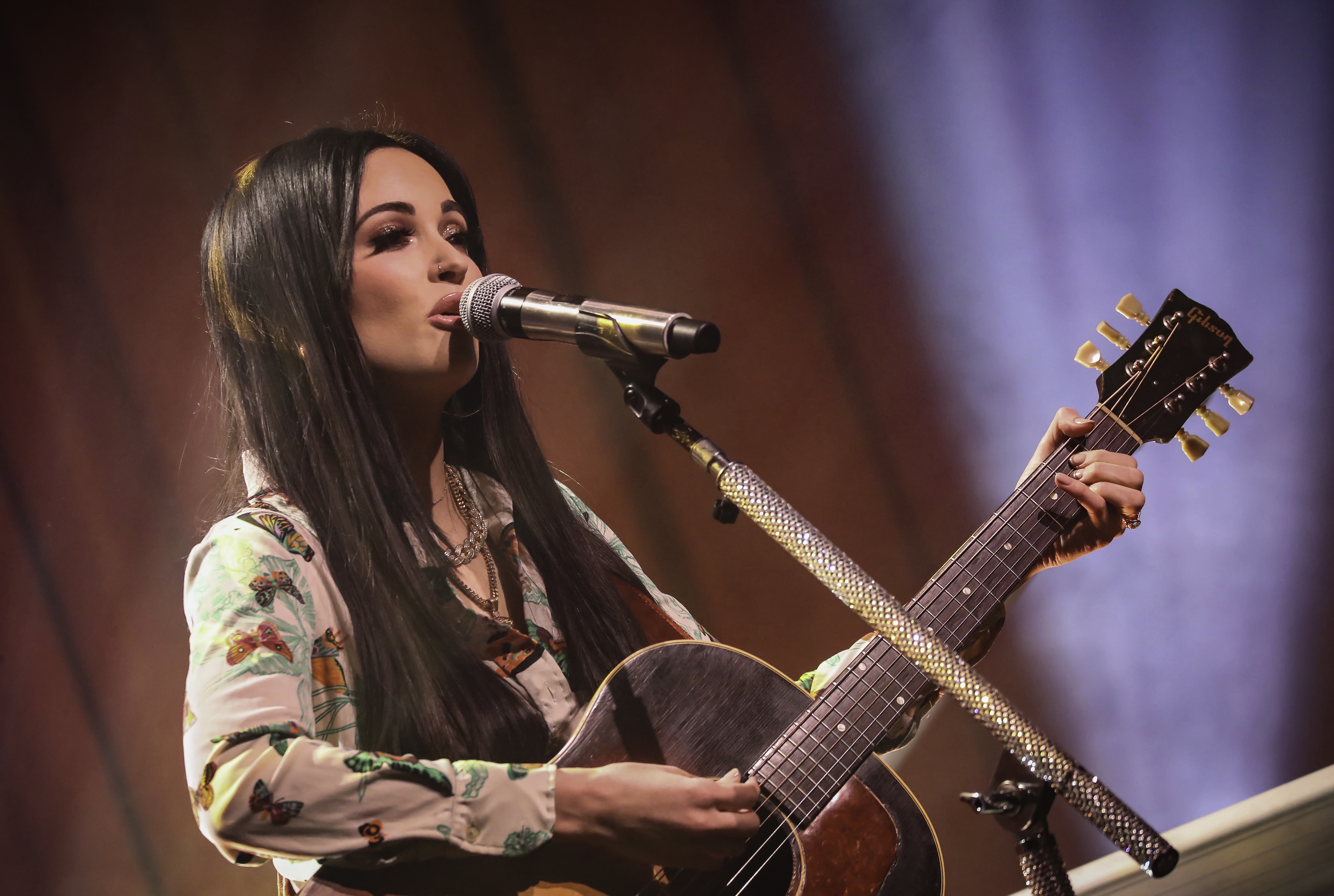
- Musgraves performing on her Oh What a World Tour in 2019
- Studio albums: 7
- EPs: 4
- Soundtrack albums: 1
- Singles: 24
- Music videos: 16
- Demo albums: 4
- Promotional singles: 6

American singer Kacey Musgraves has released seven studio albums, one soundtrack, four demo albums, four extended plays, 23 singles, six promotional singles, and 16 music videos. The earliest of Musgraves's material was released in the early 2000s with the issuing of demo albums, beginning with children duo effort Texas Two Bits with fellow student Alina Tatum, which self-released Little Bit of Texas in 2000. This was followed by her first solo album Movin' On (2002) and Wanted: One Good Cowboy (2003). She signed to Mercury Nashville in 2012. In early 2013, Musgraves released her debut full-length album Same Trailer Different Park. Critically acclaimed, the album debuted at number one on the Billboard Top Country Albums chart and number two on the Billboard 200. Its preceding lead single "Merry Go 'Round" peaked within the top 20 of the Billboard Hot Country Songs chart. The album would also spawn the top 40 singles "Blowin' Smoke" and "Follow Your Arrow". Same Trailer Different Park has since been certified platinum by the RIAA.

Musgraves's second studio album Pageant Material was released in June 2015. The record topped the Billboard Country Albums chart and debuted at number three on the Billboard 200. It spawned the singles "Biscuits" and "Dime Store Cowgirl", both minor hits on the Billboard Country Songs chart. Her third studio release was a holiday album titled A Very Kacey Christmas (2016). Critically acclaimed for its retro influences, the album debuted at number 11 on the Billboard Country Albums chart. In March 2018, Musgraves released her fourth studio album via MCA Nashville entitled Golden Hour. The album became her third studio release to reach number one on the Billboard Top Country Albums chart, selling 49,000 copies within its first week. Its lead single "Butterflies" debuted on the Country Songs chart around the same time.Her sixth album, Deeper Well, was released on March 15, 2024 and it reached number two on the Billboard 200 album chart tying it for her highest charting album of her career with her debut album. It also was her third straight (fifth overall) number one album on the Billboard Top Country Albums chart. The album received three nominations at the 67th Annual Grammy Awards, including for Best Country Album, and won for Best Country Song for "The Architect". Musgraves released her seventh album, Middle of Nowhere, on May 1, 2026 and it was preceded by the album's title track as the first single and music video in March 2026.

== Albums ==
=== Studio albums ===
List of albums, with selected chart positions and certifications, showing other relevant details
Title	Album details	Peak chart positions										Sales	Certifications
Title	Album details	US	US Cou.	US Folk	AUS	CAN	IRE	NOR	NZ	UK	UK Cou.	Sales	Certifications
Same Trailer Different Park	Released: March 19, 2013; Label: Mercury Nashville; Formats: CD, LP, digital download, streaming	2	1	18	77	13	—	—	—	39	2	US: 519,000	RIAA: Platinum; BPI: Silver
Pageant Material	Released: June 23, 2015; Label: Mercury Nashville; Formats: CD, LP, digital download, streaming	3	1	—	33	6	67	30	—	11	1	US: 300,000; CAN: 3,700	BPI: Silver
A Very Kacey Christmas	Released: October 28, 2016; Label: Mercury Nashville; Formats: CD, LP, digital download, streaming	21	11	3	—	—	—	—	—	— (Note: A Very Kacey Christmas did not enter the UK Top 100 Albums Chart, but peaked at number 80 on the UK Albums Downloads chart.)	—	US: 55,100	
Golden Hour	Released: March 30, 2018; Label: MCA Nashville; Formats: CD, LP, digital download, streaming	4	1	1	25	11	27	15	—	6	1	US: 759,000; UK: 31,600	RIAA: Platinum; BPI: Gold; MC: Platinum
Star-Crossed	Released: September 10, 2021; Label: MCA Nashville, Interscope; Formats: CD, LP, digital download, streaming	3	1	1	9	9	16	—	30	10	1	US: 47,000	
Deeper Well	Released: March 15, 2024; Label: MCA Nashville, Interscope; Formats: CD, LP, digital download, streaming	2	1	1	26	7	18	—	9	3	1	US: 66,000	
Middle of Nowhere	Released: May 1, 2026; Label: Lost Highway Records; Formats: CD, LP, digital download, streaming	3	2	2	17	11	40	90	16	7	1	US: 64,500	
"—" denotes a recording that did not chart or was not released in that territory.

=== Soundtrack albums ===
List of soundtracks, with selected chart positions and certifications, showing other relevant details
Title	Details	Peak chart positions			Sales
Title	Details	US	US Cou.	US Hol.	Sales
The Kacey Musgraves Christmas Show	Released: November 29, 2019; Label: MCA Nashville; Formats: LP, CD, Music download	120	20	9	US: 1,400

=== Demo albums ===
List of demo albums, showing relevant details
Title	Details
Little Bit of Texas (with Alina Tatum as Texas Two Bits)	Released: 2000; Label: self-released; Formats: CD
Movin' On	Released: July 16, 2002; Label: CDBaby; Formats: CD
Wanted: One Good Cowboy	Released: May 19, 2003; Label: self-released; Formats: CD
Kacey Musgraves	Released: March 6, 2007; Label: self-released; Formats: CD

== Extended plays ==
List of EPs, showing relevant details
Title	Details
Apologize/See You Again (EP)	Released: 2013; Label: Triple Pop; Formats: CD, music download
Spotify Sessions – Live from Bonnaroo 2013	Released: 2014; Label: Mercury; Formats: Music download
Spotify Sessions – Live from Spotify House '16	Released: August 12, 2016; Label: Mercury; Formats: Music download
Acoustic Remixed	Released: March 16, 2018; Label: Triple Pop; Formats: CD, music download

== Singles ==
=== As lead artist ===
List of singles, with selected chart positions and certifications, showing other relevant details
Title	Year	Peak chart positions									Sales	Certifications	Album
Title	Year	US	US Cou. Songs	US Cou. Air.	US AAA	CAN	CAN Cou.	NZ Hot	UK DL	UK Phy.	Sales	Certifications	Album
"Apologize"	2012	— (Note: "Apologize" did not enter the Billboard Hot 100, but charted at number 23 on the Hot Singles Sales chart.)	—	—	—	—	—	—	—	—	US: 250,000		Non-album singles
"See You Again"	2012	—	—	—	—	—	—	—	—	—			Non-album singles
"Merry Go 'Round"	2012	63	14	10	—	84	26	—	—	—	US: 825,000	RIAA: 2× Platinum	Same Trailer Different Park
"Blowin' Smoke"	2013	— (Note: "Blowin' Smoke" did not enter the Billboard Hot 100, but charted at number 7 on the Bubbling Under Hot 100 Singles extension chart.)	31	23	—	—	46	—	—	—	US: 218,000	RIAA: Platinum	Same Trailer Different Park
"Follow Your Arrow"	2013	60	10	43	—	50	42	—	—	—	US: 526,864	RIAA: Platinum	Same Trailer Different Park
"Keep It to Yourself"	2014	—	40	32	—	—	48	—	—	—			Same Trailer Different Park
"Biscuits"	2015	— (Note: "Biscuits" did not enter the Billboard Hot 100, but charted at number 21 on the Bubbling Under Hot 100 Singles extension chart.)	28	41	—	—	36	—	—	—	US: 138,000	RIAA: Gold	Pageant Material
"Dime Store Cowgirl"	2015	—	44	—	—	—	—	—	—	—	US: 4,000		Pageant Material
"Butterflies"	2018	—	32	56	—	—	—	—	—	—	US: 69,000	RIAA: Platinum; MC: Platinum; RMNZ: Gold	Golden Hour
"Space Cowboy"	2018	—	30	—	—	—	—	—	—	—		RIAA: Platinum	Golden Hour
"High Horse"	2018	—	36	—	—	—	—	—	—	22		RIAA: Platinum	Golden Hour
"Rainbow"	2019	98	17	33	—	— (Note: "Rainbow" did not enter the Billboard Canadian Hot 100, but charted at number 12 on the Hot Canadian Digital Song Sales chart.)	43	29	50	—	US: 143,000	RIAA: 2× Platinum; MC: 2× Platinum; RMNZ: Gold	Golden Hour
"Justified"	2021	— (Note: "Justified" did not enter the Billboard Hot 100, but charted at number 2 on the Bubbling Under Hot 100 Singles extension chart.)	22	—	4	—	—	23	—	—			Star-Crossed
"Camera Roll"	2022	—	—	—	29	—	—	—	—	—			Star-Crossed
"Deeper Well"	2024	76	17	—	—	—	—	28	—	—			Deeper Well
"Too Good to Be True"	2024	— (Note: "Too Good to Be True" did not enter the Billboard Hot 100, but charted at number 2 on the Bubbling Under Hot 100 Singles extension chart.)	29	—	—	—	—	25	—	—			Deeper Well
"Cardinal"	2024	— (Note: "Cardinal" did not enter the Billboard Hot 100, but charted at number 12 on the Bubbling Under Hot 100 Singles extension chart.)	33	—	8	–	—	—	—	—			Deeper Well
"The Architect"	2024	— (Note: "The Architect" did not enter the Billboard Hot 100, but charted at number 22 on the Bubbling Under Hot 100 Singles extension chart.)	38	—	—	—	—	35	—	—			Deeper Well
"Lost Highway"	2025	—	—	—	—	—	—	—	—	—			Non-album single
"Dry Spell"	2026	55	15	34	3	63	32	16	—	—			Middle of Nowhere
"Middle of Nowhere"	2026	— (Note: "Middle of Nowhere" did not enter the US Billboard Hot 100, but peaked at number 4 on the Bubbling Under Hot 100 chart.)	32	—	—	—	—	17	—	—			Middle of Nowhere
"Loneliest Girl"	2026	— (Note: "Loneliest Girl" did not enter the US Billboard Hot 100, but peaked at number 6 on the Bubbling Under Hot 100 chart.)	36	35	—	—	—	—	—	—			Middle of Nowhere
"Mexico Honey"	2026	39	11	—	21	62	—	—	—	—			Middle of Nowhere
"—" denotes a recording that did not chart or was not released in that territory.

=== As featured artist ===
List of singles, with selected chart positions, showing other relevant details
Title	Year	Peak chart positions							Certifications	Album
Title	Year	US	US Cou. Songs	US Cou. Air.	US Rock	CAN	CAN Cou.	UK	Certifications	Album
"Oh, Tonight" (Josh Abbott Band featuring Kacey Musgraves)	2011	—	44		—	—	—	—		She's Like Texas
"Waves" (remix) (Miguel featuring Kacey Musgraves)	2016	—	—	—	—	—	—	—		Wildheart
"Hands" (with Various Artists)	2016	—	—	—	—	—	—	—		Non-album singles
"Forever Country" (with Artists of Then, Now & Forever)	2016	21	1	32	—	34	25	— (Note: Forever Country did not enter the UK Top 100 Singles Chart, but peaked at number 58 on the UK Singles Downloads chart.)	RIAA: Gold	Non-album singles
"Do You Love Texas?" (Shooter Jennings featuring Jason Boland, Kacey Musgraves, Kris Kristofferson, Randy Rogers, Ray Benson, & Whiskey Myers)	2017	—	—	—	—	—	—	—		Non-album singles
"Drive Away" (The Brummies featuring Kacey Musgraves)	2018	—	—	—	—	—	—	—		Eternal Reach
"Pictures" (Judah & the Lion featuring Kacey Musgraves)	2019	—	—	—	44	—	—	—		Pep Talks
"Easy" (with Troye Sivan featuring Mark Ronson)	2020	—	—	—	—	—	—	—		Non-album single
"Sitting in the Corner" (Cuco featuring Kacey Musgraves and Adriel Favela)	2022	—	—	—	—	—	—	—		Fantasy Gateway
"I Remember Everything" (Zach Bryan featuring Kacey Musgraves)	2023	1	1	26	1	2	14	14	RIAA: Diamond; ARIA: Platinum; BPI: 2× Platinum; MC: Diamond; RMNZ: 5× Platinum	Zach Bryan
"She Calls Me Back" (Noah Kahan with Kacey Musgraves)	2023	76	—	—	—	62	—	—	RIAA: 2× Platinum	Stick Season (Forever)
"Overtime" (Rainbow Kitten Surprise featuring Kacey Musgraves)	2024	—	—	—	—	—	—	—		Love Hate Music Box
"Lost in Translation" (Carín León featuring Kacey Musgraves)	2025	—	—	—	—	—	—	—		Non-album single

=== Promotional singles ===
List of promotional singles, with selected chart positions, showing other relevant details
Title	Year	Peak chart positions						Album
Title	Year	US Cou.	US Dig.	US AAA	US Hol. Dig.	CAN Dig.	UK DL	Album
"The Trailer Song"	2014	46	—	—	—	—	—	Non-album promotional singles
"Oh, What a World 2.0"	2020	—	—	31	—	—	—	Non-album promotional singles
"Glittery" (featuring Troye Sivan)	2020	33	—	—	18	—	—	The Kacey Musgraves Christmas Show
"Star-Crossed"	2021	37	—	—	—	—	—	Star-Crossed
"Fix You"	2021	—	—	—	—	—	—	Non-album promotional single
"Can't Help Falling in Love"	2022	—	24	—	—	48	95	Elvis (Original Motion Picture Soundtrack)
"Three Little Birds"	2024	38	—	—	—	—	—	Bob Marley: One Love (Original Motion Picture Soundtrack)
"If the World Burns Down"	2025	—	—	—	—	—	—	Nobody Wants This (Soundtrack from the Netflix Series)
"—" denotes a recording that did not chart or was not released in that territory.

== Other charted and certified songs ==
List of singles, with selected chart positions, showing other relevant details
Title	Year	Peak chart positions										Certifications	Album
Title	Year	US	US Dig.	US Cou.	US Cou. Air.	US Hol.	CAN	CAN AC	BEL (FL) Tip	NZ Hot	UK DL	Certifications	Album
"High Time"	2015	—	—	—	—	—	—	—	—	—	91		Pageant Material
"Rudolph the Red-Nosed Reindeer"	2016	—	—	—	—	—	—	33	—	—	—		A Very Kacey Christmas
"Slow Burn"	2018	—	—	—	—	—	—	—	—	—	—	RIAA: Platinum; MC: Platinum; RMNZ: Gold	Golden Hour
"Oh, What a World"	2018	—	—	—	—	—	—	—	–	—	—	RIAA: Gold	Golden Hour
"Wonder Woman"	2018	—	—	—	—	—	—	—	21	—	—		Golden Hour
"Neon Moon" (with Brooks & Dunn)	2019	—	24	30	—	—	—	—	—	—	—	RIAA: Platinum	Reboot
"All Is Found"	2019	—	—	31	—	—	—	—	—	—	—	RIAA: Platinum	Frozen II
"Rockin' Around the Christmas Tree" (with Camila Cabello)	2019	— (Note: "Rockin' Around the Christmas Tree" did not enter the US Billboard Hot 100, but peaked at number 13 on the Bubbling Under Hot 100 chart.)	—	20	—	97	—	—	—	13	—		The Kacey Musgraves Christmas Show
"I'll Be Home for Christmas" (with Lana Del Rey)	2019	—	—	—	—	— (Note: "I'll Be Home for Christmas" did not enter the Billboard Holiday 100, but charted at number 34 on the Holiday Digital Song Sales chart.)	—	—	—	—	—		The Kacey Musgraves Christmas Show
"Good Wife"	2021	—	—	41	—	—	—	—	—	—	—		Star-Crossed
"Cherry Blossom"	2021	—	—	44	—	—	—	—	—	—	—		Star-Crossed
"Simple Times"	2021	— (Note: "Simple Times" did not enter the US Billboard Hot 100, but peaked at number 15 on the Bubbling Under Hot 100 chart.)	—	31	—	—	—	—	—	37	—		Star-Crossed
"Breadwinner"	2021	—	—	36	—	—	—	—	—	—	—		Star-Crossed
"Bells & Whistles" (Megan Moroney featuring Kacey Musgraves)	2026	— (Note: "Bells & Whistles" did not enter the US Billboard Hot 100, but peaked at number 4 on the Bubbling Under Hot 100 chart.)	—	35	—	—	—	—	—	—	—		Cloud 9
"Back on the Wagon"	2026	— (Note: "Back on the Wagon" did not enter the US Billboard Hot 100, but peaked at number 23 on the Bubbling Under Hot 100 chart.)	—	44	—	—	—	—	—	—	—		Middle of Nowhere
"I Believe in Ghosts"	2026	—	—	49	—	—	—	—	—	—	—		Middle of Nowhere
"Horses and Divorces" (featuring Miranda Lambert)	2026	84	—	23	—	—	—	—	—	19	—		Middle of Nowhere
"Uncertain, TX" (featuring Willie Nelson)	2026	—	—	50	—	—	—	—	—	—	—		Middle of Nowhere
"—" denotes a recording that did not chart or was not released in that territory.

== Music videos ==
List of music videos, showing year released and director
Title	Year	Director(s)	Ref.
"Oh Tonight" (with Josh Abbott Band)	2011	Evan Kaufmann	
"Merry Go 'Round"	2012	Perry Bean, Kacey Musgraves	
"Blowin' Smoke"	2013	Honey	
"Follow Your Arrow"	2013	Honey, Kacey Musgraves	
"Biscuits"	2015	Marc Klasfeld	
"Are You Sure"	2015	Reid Long	
"Forever Country" (as Artists of Then, Now and Forever)	2016	Joseph Kahn	
"Butterflies"	2018	Courtney Phillips	
"Space Cowboy"	2018	Courtney Phillips	
"Mother"	2018	Stephen & Alexa Kinigopoulos	
"High Horse"	2018	Hannah Lux Davis	
"Rainbow"	2019	Hannah Lux Davis	
"Easy" (with Troye Sivan and Mark Ronson)	2020	Bardia Zeinali	
"Justified"	2021	Bardia Zeinali	
"Simple Times"	2021	Bardia Zeinali	
"Deeper Well"	2024	Hannah Lux Davis	
"Too Good To Be True"	2024	Scott Cudmore	
"Dry Spell"	2026	Kacey Musgraves & Hannah Lux Davis	

== Other appearances ==
List of non-single guest appearances, with other performing artists, showing year released and album name
Title	Year	Other artist(s)	Album	Ref.
"You Win Again"	2007	none	Nashville Star	
"See You Again"	2008	none	Stars of Montana	
"Highly Recommended"	2009	Mark McKinney	Middle America	
"As Good as It Gets"	2009	Mark McKinney	Middle America	
"Wasting Time"	2009	Mark McKinney	Middle America	
"Mama's Broken Heart"	2011	Miranda Lambert	Four the Record	
"The River Song"	2011	Mark McKinney	The Truth	
"The Truth"	2011	Mark McKinney	The Truth	
"Touch"	2012	Josh Abbott Band	Small Town Family Dream	
"She Will Be Free"	2012	Josh Abbott Band	Small Town Family Dream	
"Hotty Toddy"	2012	Josh Abbott Band	Small Town Family Dream	
"Dallas Love"	2012	Josh Abbott Band	Small Town Family Dream	
"Small Town Family Dream"	2012	Josh Abbott Band	Small Town Family Dream	
"Matagorda Bay"	2012	Josh Abbott Band	Small Town Family Dream	
"Bourbon in Kentucky"	2013	Dierks Bentley	Riser	
"Heartache Song'	2013	none	Sandra Boynton's Frog Trouble	
"Love Is a Liar"	2014	none	The Best of Me: Original Motion Picture Soundtrack	
"Guess You Had to Be There"	2015	Brian Wilson	No Pier Pressure	
"A Spoonful of Sugar"	2015	none	We Love Disney	
"Daughter"	2016	Brandy Clark	Big Day in a Small Town	
"Love's Gonna Live Here"	2016	Buddy Miller	Cayamo Sessions at Sea	
"Mental Cruelty"	2016	John Prine	For Better, or Worse	
"Moonshine"	2016	Foy Vance	Live by Night (Original Motion Picture Soundtrack)	
"The Wurlitzer Prize"	2017	none	Outlaw: Celebrating The Music of Waylon Jennings	
"Luckenbach, Texas (Back to the Basics of Love)"	2017	Willie Nelson	Outlaw: Celebrating The Music of Waylon Jennings	
"All the Best"	2017	Zac Brown Band	Welcome Home	
"Pretty Good"	2018	The Get You	Take Cover	
"Kansas City Star"	2018	none	King of the Road: A Tribute to Roger Miller	
"Roy Rogers"	2018	none	Restoration: Reimagining the Songs of Elton John and Bernie Taupin	
"To June This Morning"	2018	Ruston Kelly	Forever Words	
"No Getting Over Me"	2019	Ronnie Milsap	The Duets	
"Neon Moon"	2019	Brooks & Dunn	Reboot	
"All Is Found" (end credits)	2019	none	Frozen 2 (Original Motion Picture Soundtrack)	
"Rainbow"	2020	none	One World: Together at Home	
"Flowers of Neptune 6"	2020	The Flaming Lips	American Head	
"God and the Policeman"	2020	The Flaming Lips	American Head	
"Don't Do Me Good"	2023	Madi Diaz	Weird Faith	
"Three Little Birds"	2024	none	Bob Marley: One Love (Music Inspired by the Film) (EP)	
"If the World Burns Down"	2025	none	Nobody Wants This (Soundtrack from the Netflix Series)	
