= List of awards and nominations received by Kacey Musgraves =

Kacey Musgraves awards and nominations
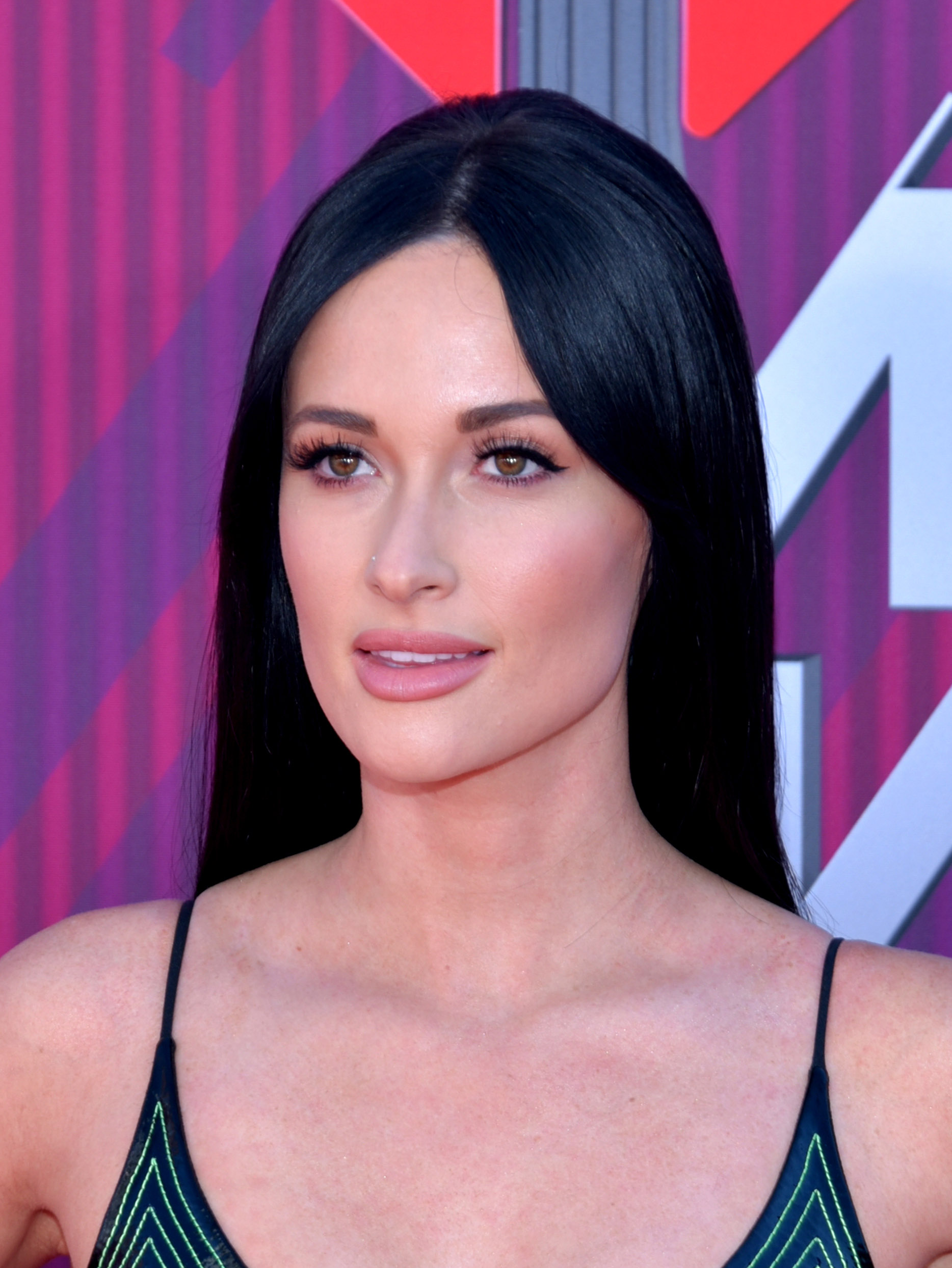
- Musgraves at the 2019 iHeartRadio Music Awards
Awards and nominations
Award	Wins	Nominations
ACM Awards	4	20
CMA Awards	7	29
CMT Music Awards	0	9
Grammy Awards	8	21
iHeartRadio Music Awards	1	3

Totals (Note: Certain award groups do not simply award one winner. They acknowledge several different recipients, have runners-up, and have third place. Since this is a specific recognition and is different from losing an award, runner-up mentions are considered wins in this award tally. For simplification and to avoid errors, each award in this list has been presumed to have had a prior nomination.)
- Wins: 28
- Nominations: 91

This is a list of awards and nominations received by Kacey Musgraves, an American singer and songwriter.

== Awards and nominations ==
Award	Year	Category	Work	Result	Ref.
Academy of Country Music Awards	2013	Female Vocalist of the Year	Herself	Nominated	
Academy of Country Music Awards	2013	New Female Vocalist of the Year	Herself	Nominated	
Academy of Country Music Awards	2013	Music Video of the Year	"Merry Go 'Round"	Nominated	
Academy of Country Music Awards	2014	Female Vocalist of the Year	Herself	Nominated	
Academy of Country Music Awards	2014	Album of the Year	Same Trailer Different Park	Won	
Academy of Country Music Awards	2014	Song of the Year	"Mama's Broken Heart" (as songwriter)	Nominated	
Academy of Country Music Awards	2014	Video of the Year	"Blowin' Smoke"	Nominated	
Academy of Country Music Awards	2016	Video of the Year	"Biscuits"	Nominated	
Academy of Country Music Awards	2016	Female Vocalist of the Year	Herself	Nominated	
Academy of Country Music Awards	2017	Female Vocalist of the Year	Herself	Nominated	
Academy of Country Music Awards	2019	Female Vocalist of the Year	Herself	Won	
Academy of Country Music Awards	2019	International Achievement Award	Herself	Won	
Academy of Country Music Awards	2019	Album of the Year	Golden Hour	Won	
Academy of Country Music Awards	2019	Song of the Year	"Space Cowboy"	Nominated	
Academy of Country Music Awards	2020	Female Artist of the Year	Herself	Nominated	
Academy of Country Music Awards	2020	Single of the Year	"Rainbow"	Nominated	
Academy of Country Music Awards	2024	Female Artist of the Year	Herself	Nominated	
Academy of Country Music Awards	2024	Music Event of the Year	"I Remember Everything" (with Zach Bryan)	Nominated	
Academy of Country Music Awards	2025	Female Artist of the Year	Herself	Nominated	
Academy of Country Music Awards	2025	Song of the Year	"The Architect"	Nominated	
Academy of Country Music Honors	2026	ACM Spirit Award	Herself	Honored	
American Country Awards	2016	New Artist of the Year	Herself	Nominated	
American Country Awards	2016	Song of the Year	"Mama's Broken Heart"	Nominated	
American Country Awards	2016	Song of the Year	"Merry Go 'Round"	Nominated	
American Country Awards	2016	Music Video by a New Artist	"Merry Go 'Round"	Nominated	
American Music Awards	2014	Favorite Female Artist – Country	Herself	Nominated	
American Music Awards	2021	Favorite Female Artist – Country	Herself	Nominated	
Americana Awards	2016	Song of the Year	"Dime Store Cowgirl"	Nominated	
Americana Awards	2019	Artist of the Year	Herself	Nominated	
Billboard Music Awards	2019	Top Country Female Artist	Herself	Nominated	
Billboard Music Awards	2023	Top Rock Song	"I Remember Everything" (with Zach Bryan)	Nominated	
Billboard Music Awards	2024	Top Rock Song	"I Remember Everything" (with Zach Bryan)	Won	
Billboard Music Awards	2024	Top Collaboration	"I Remember Everything" (with Zach Bryan)	Nominated	
Billboard Music Awards	2024	Top Streaming Song	"I Remember Everything" (with Zach Bryan)	Won	
Billboard Music Awards	2024	Top Country Song	"I Remember Everything" (with Zach Bryan)	Nominated	
Billboard Women in Music	2018	Innovator Award	Herself	Won	
Country Music Association Awards	2013	Female Vocalist of the Year	Herself	Nominated	
Country Music Association Awards	2013	New Artist of the Year	Herself	Won	
Country Music Association Awards	2013	Album of the Year	Same Trailer Different Park	Nominated	
Country Music Association Awards	2013	Song of the Year	"Mama's Broken Heart"(as songwriter)	Nominated	
Country Music Association Awards	2013	Song of the Year	"Merry Go 'Round"	Nominated	
Country Music Association Awards	2013	Single of the Year	"Merry Go 'Round"	Nominated	
Country Music Association Awards	2014	Song of the Year	"Follow Your Arrow"	Won	
Country Music Association Awards	2014	Video of the Year	"Follow Your Arrow"	Nominated	
Country Music Association Awards	2014	Female Vocalist of the Year	Herself	Nominated	
Country Music Association Awards	2015	Female Vocalist of the Year	Herself	Nominated	
Country Music Association Awards	2015	Album of the Year	Pageant Material	Nominated	
Country Music Association Awards	2015	Video of the Year	"Biscuits"	Nominated	
Country Music Association Awards	2016	Female Vocalist of the Year	Herself	Nominated	
Country Music Association Awards	2016	International Achievement Award	Herself	Won	
Country Music Association Awards	2018	Female Vocalist of the Year	Herself	Nominated	
Country Music Association Awards	2018	Album of the Year	Golden Hour	Won	
Country Music Association Awards	2019	Female Vocalist of the Year	Herself	Won	
Country Music Association Awards	2019	Song of the Year	"Rainbow"	Nominated	
Country Music Association Awards	2019	Music Video of the Year	"Rainbow"	Won	
Country Music Association Awards	2019	International Achievement Award	Herself	Won	
Country Music Association Awards	2020	Female Vocalist of the Year	Herself	Nominated	
Country Music Association Awards	2024	Album of the Year	Deeper Well	Nominated	
Country Music Association Awards	2024	Musical Event of the Year	"I Remember Everything" (with Zach Bryan)	Nominated	
Country Music Association Awards	2024	Female Vocalist of the Year	Herself	Nominated	
Country Music Association Awards	2026	Female Vocalist of the Year	Herself	Nominated	
Country Music Association Awards	2026	Album of the Year	Middle of Nowhere	Nominated	
Country Music Association Awards	2026	Song of the Year	"Dry Spell"	Nominated	
Country Music Association Awards	2026	Music Video of the Year	"Dry Spell"	Nominated	
Country Music Association Awards	2026	Musical Event of the Year	"Horses and Divorces" (with Miranda Lambert)	Nominated	
CMT Music Awards	2013	Female Video of the Year	"Merry Go 'Round"	Nominated	
CMT Music Awards	2013	Breakthrough Video of the Year	"Merry Go 'Round"	Nominated	
CMT Music Awards	2014	Video of the Year	"Follow Your Arrow"	Nominated	
CMT Music Awards	2014	Female Video of the Year	"Follow Your Arrow"	Nominated	
CMT Music Awards	2015	CMT Performance of the Year	"Roar" from CMT Crossroads (with Katy Perry)	Nominated	
CMT Music Awards	2016	Female Video of the Year	"Biscuits"	Nominated	
CMT Music Awards	2019	Female Video of the Year	"Space Cowboy"	Nominated	
CMT Music Awards	2022	Female Video of the Year	"Justified"	Nominated	
CMT Music Awards	2024	Female Video of the Year	"Deeper Well"	Nominated	
GLAAD Media Awards	2022	Vanguard Award	Herself	Won	
Grammy Awards	2014	Best New Artist	Herself	Nominated	
Grammy Awards	2014	Best Country Song	"Mama's Broken Heart"	Nominated	
Grammy Awards	2014	Best Country Song	"Merry Go 'Round"	Won	
Grammy Awards	2014	Best Country Album	Same Trailer Different Park	Won	
Grammy Awards	2016	Best Country Album	Pageant Material	Nominated	
Grammy Awards	2019	Best Country Album	Golden Hour	Won	
Grammy Awards	2019	Album of the Year	Golden Hour	Won	
Grammy Awards	2019	Best Country Song	"Space Cowboy"	Won	
Grammy Awards	2019	Best Country Solo Performance	"Butterflies"	Won	
Grammy Awards	2022	Best Country Solo Performance	"Camera Roll"	Nominated	
Grammy Awards	2022	Best Country Song	"Camera Roll"	Nominated	
Grammy Awards	2024	Best Country Song	"I Remember Everything" (with Zach Bryan)	Nominated	
Grammy Awards	2024	Best Country Duo/Group Performance	"I Remember Everything" (with Zach Bryan)	Won	
Grammy Awards	2025	Best Country Solo Performance	"The Architect"	Nominated	
Grammy Awards	2025	Best Country Song	"The Architect"	Won	
Grammy Awards	2025	Best Country Album	Deeper Well	Nominated	
Grammy Awards	2025	Best Americana Performance	"Don't Do Me Good" (with Madi Diaz)	Nominated	
Grammy Awards	2027	Best Contemporary Country Album	Middle of Nowhere	Pending	
Grammy Awards	2027	Best Country Solo Performance	"Dry Spell"	Pending	
Grammy Awards	2027	Best Country Song	"Dry Spell"	Pending	
Grammy Awards	2027	Best Country Duo/Group Performance	"Horses and Divorces" (featuring Miranda Lambert)	Pending	
iHeartRadio Music Awards	2019	Best Cover Song	"You're Still the One" (with Harry Styles)	Won	
iHeartRadio Music Awards	2022	Best Comeback Album	Star-Crossed	Nominated	
iHeartRadio Music Awards	2022	Best Cover Song	"Fix You"	Nominated	
MTV Video Music Awards	2022	Best Long Form Video	Star-crossed: The Film	Nominated	
MTV Video Music Awards	2022	Best Art Direction	"Simple Times"	Nominated	
MTV Video Music Awards	2026	Best Country	"Dry Spell"	Pending	
People's Choice Awards	2016	Favorite Female Country Artist	Herself	Nominated	
People's Choice Awards	2021	The Album of the Year	Star-Crossed	Nominated	
People's Choice Awards	2021	The Country Artist of the Year	Herself	Nominated	
People's Choice Awards	2024	The Collaboration Song of the Year	"I Remember Everything" (with Zach Bryan)	Nominated	
People's Choice Country Awards	2024	The People’s Artist of 2024	Herself	Nominated	
People's Choice Country Awards	2024	The Female Artist of 2024	Herself	Nominated	
People's Choice Country Awards	2024	The Song of 2024	"I Remember Everything" (with Zach Bryan)	Nominated	
People's Choice Country Awards	2024	The Collaboration Song of 2024	"I Remember Everything" (with Zach Bryan)	Won	
People's Choice Country Awards	2024	The Female Song of 2024	"Deeper Well"	Nominated	
People's Choice Country Awards	2024	The Music Video of 2024	"Deeper Well"	Nominated	
People's Choice Country Awards	2024	The Storyteller Song of 2024	"Deeper Well"	Nominated	
People's Choice Country Awards	2024	The Storyteller Song of 2024	"Too Good to be True"	Nominated	
People's Choice Country Awards	2024	The Cover Song of 2024	"Three Little Birds"	Nominated	
People's Choice Country Awards	2024	The Album of 2024	Deeper Well	Nominated	
Pollstar Awards	2020	Best Country Tour	Oh, What A World Tour I & II	Won	
Pollstar Awards	2022	Best Country Tour	Star-Crossed: Unveiled - Tour	Nominated	
Premio Lo Nuestro	2026	Crossover Collaboration of the Year	"Lost In Translation" (with Carín León)	Won	
Teen Choice Awards	2019	Choice Country Artist	Herself	Nominated	
Teen Choice Awards	2019	Choice Country Song	"Rainbow"	Nominated	
UK Americana Awards	2016	International Album of the Year	Pageant Material	Nominated	

== Other honors ==
Country Music Hall of Fame — The Country Music Hall of Fame and Museum in Nashville, Tennessee, is one of the world's largest museums and research centers dedicated to the preservation and interpretation of American vernacular music.

Year	Recipient	Category	Result	Ref.
2019	Kacey Musgraves	American Currents	Won	

== Listicles ==
Name of publisher, name of listicle, year(s) listed, and placement result The Year denotes when the article(s) were published
Year	Publication	Listicle(s)	For	Rank	Ref.
2019	Taste of Country	50 Best Country Songs of the 2000s	"Follow Your Arrow"	Placed	
2020	Rolling Stone	500 Greatest Albums of All Time	Golden Hour	270th	
2020	The DePaulia	Best Albums By Female Artists	Golden Hour	5th	
2020	The Young Folks	15 Female Musicians That Defined the 2010s	Kacey Musgraves	12th	
2021	Billboard	50 Best Albums of 2021	Star-Crossed	13th	
2021	MTV	10 Greatest Queer Anthems of the 21st Century	"Follow Your Arrow"	Placed	
2021	Pitchfork	The 200 Best Albums of the Last 25 Years	Golden Hour	62nd	
2021	Pitchfork	200 Most Important Artists of the Last 25 Years	Kacey Musgraves	Placed	
2021	Rolling Stone	50 Best Songs of 2021	"Breadwinner"	23rd	
2021	Rolling Stone	25 Best Country And Americana Albums of 2021	Star-Crossed	25th	
2021	Los Angeles Times	The 100 Best Songs of 2021	"Camera Roll"	14th	
2022	Billboard	The 21 Best Christmas Albums of the 21st Century	A Very Kacey Christmas	5th	
2022	Rolling Stone	Best Debut Albums of all Time	Same Trailer Different Park	80th	
2023	Entertainment Focus	Top 10 Best Debut Albums in Country Music History	Same Trailer Different Park	10th	
2023	Rolling Stone	50 Most Inspirational LGBTQ+ Anthems of All Time	"Follow Your Arrow"	4th	
2023	Rolling Stone	50 Most Inspirational LGBTQ+ Anthems of All Time	"Rainbow"	35th	
2023	Vogue	Best Performances in Met History	Kacey Musgraves and Lenny Kravitz	Placed	
2024	Apple Music	100 Best Albums of All Time	Golden Hour	85th	
2024	Apple Music	Best Albums of 2024 (So Far)	Deeper Well	Placed	
2024	A.V Club	25 Best Songs of 2024 (So Far)	"Jade Green"	Placed	
2024	Billboard	Best Songs of 2024 (So Far)	"Deeper Well"	11th	
2024	Billboard	The 100 Greatest Songs of the Music Industry	"Good Ol’ Boys Club"	13th	
2024	Billboard	50 Best Albums of 2024	Deeper Well	12th	
2024	British GQ	Best Country Albums of all Time	Golden Hour	Placed	
2024	Consequence	30 Best Albums of 2024 (So Far)	Deeper Well	2nd	
2024	Consequence	50 Best Albums of 2024	Deeper Well	8th	
2024	Esquire	65 Best Christmas Songs of All Time	"Christmas Makes Me Cry"	Placed	
2024	People	Top 10 Best Albums of 2024	Deeper Well	5th	
2024	Rolling Stone	100 Best Songs Of 2024	"Cardinal"	53rd	
2024	Rolling Stone	The 200 Greatest Country Songs of All Time	"Follow Your Arrow"	36th	
2024	Time Out	The 50 best Christmas Songs of All Time	"Glittery"	48th	
2024	The New York Times	40 Best Songs of 2024 (So Far)	"Deeper Well"	Placed	
2024	Variety	The 20 Best Albums of 2024 (So Far)	Deeper Well	Placed	

Billboard Magazine Year-End listicles: (Billboard Year-End charts are cumulative rankings of entries in Billboard magazine charts in the United States in any given chart year.
Year	Listicle	For	Position	Ref.
2013	Top New Country Artists	Kacey Musgraves	1st	
2013	Top Country Artists — Female	Kacey Musgraves	4th	
2013	Top Country Albums	Same Trailer Different Park	26th	
2013	Hot Country Songs	Merry Go ‘Round	52nd	
2013	Country Airplay	Merry Go ‘Round	63rd	
2013	Hot Country Songs	Follow Your Arrow	90th	
2013	Hot Country Songs	Blowin’ Smoke	91st	
2013	Country Airplay	Blowin’ Smoke	95th	
2013	Top Billboard 200 Albums	Same Trailer Different Park	114th	
2014	Top Country Albums	Same Trailer Different Park	14th	
2014	Top Billboard 200 Albums	Same Trailer Different Park	85th	
2015	Top Country Albums	Pageant Material	26th	
2015	Hot Country Songs	Biscuits	90th	
2015	Top Billboard 200 Albums	Pageant Material	181st	
