= Same Tour Different Trailer =

2013–15 concert tour by Kacey Musgraves

Same Trailer Different Tour
- Tour by Kacey Musgraves
- Associated album: Same Trailer Different Park
- Start date: September 19, 2013
- End date: May 3, 2015
- Legs: 7
- No. of shows: 61 in North America; 19 in Europe; 80 Total

Kacey Musgraves concert chronology
- Same Trailer Different Tour (2013-15); Country & Western Rhinestone Revue (2015-16)

The Same Trailer Different Tour (also known as the Same Tour Different Trailer) was the first concert tour by American recording artist Kacey Musgraves. The tour supported her debut studio album, Same Trailer Different Park (2013). The tour played 80 concerts in North America and Europe. The tour was produced by AEG Live and The Messina Group.

== Opening acts ==
- Rayland Baxter (Europe—Leg 1) (North America, select dates)
- John & Jacob (Europe—Leg 2, select dates) (North America, select dates)
- Sugar + the Hi-Lows (Ottawa, Toronto, Helotes)
- Count This Penny (Madison, February 2014)
- Humming House (El Paso, Tucson, Oakland, Fort Worth)

== Setlist ==
The following setlist was obtained from the September 19, 2013 concert, held at the Bowery Ballroom in New York City, New York. It does not represent all concerts for the duration of the tour.

1. "The Trailer Song"
2. "Stupid"
3. "Silver Lining"
4. "Island in the Sun"
5. "I Miss You"
6. "Blowin' Smoke"
7. "Keep It to Yourself"
8. "I Put a Spell on You"
9. "Mama's Broken Heart"
10. "High Time"
11. "Back on the Map"
12. "It Is What It Is"
13. "Step Off" / "Three Little Birds"
14. "Merry Go 'Round"

Encore

15. "Rainbow"
16. "My House"
17. "Follow Your Arrow"

== Tour dates ==
Date	City	Country	Venue
North America
September 19, 2013	New York City	United States	Bowery Ballroom
September 20, 2013^{[A]}	Ocean City	United States	Roland E. Powell Convention Center
September 21, 2013^{[B]}	Saratoga Springs	United States	Saratoga Performing Arts Center
September 27, 2013^{[C]}	Nashville	United States	Riverfront Park
Europe
October 2, 2013	Stockholm	Sweden	Nalen
October 3, 2013	Oslo	Norway	John Dee Live Club
October 6, 2013	Berlin	Germany	Postbahnhof
October 7, 2013	Amsterdam	Netherlands	Paradiso
October 9, 2013	Glasgow	Scotland	Òran Mór
October 10, 2013	Manchester	England	Manchester Academy 3
October 11, 2013	Dublin	Ireland	Whelan's
October 13, 2013	London	England	O_{2} Shepherd's Bush Empire
North America
October 16, 2013^{[D]}	San Antonio	United States	Majestic Theatre
October 17, 2013^{[E]}	Ozark	United States	Mulberry Mountain
October 18, 2013^{[F]}	Dallas	United States	Silverado Main Stage
October 19, 2013^{[C]}	Charleston	United States	Blackbaud Stadium
October 23, 2013^{[G]}	Los Angeles	United States	Hollywood Bowl
October 29, 2013	Columbia	United States	Jesse Auditorium
October 30, 2013	Richmond	United States	EKU Center of the Arts
October 31, 2013	Athens	United States	TBAM Auditorium
December 6, 2013	Milwaukee	United States	Rave Hall
December 7, 2013	Detroit	United States	Saint Andrew's Hall
December 12, 2013^{[H]}	New Orleans	United States	House of Blues
December 13, 2013	Chattanooga	United States	Track 29
February 8, 2014	Madison	United States	Barrymore Theatre
April 9, 2014	Cullowhee	United States	Ramsey Center Theater
Europe
June 27, 2014	Manchester	England	The Ritz
June 28, 2014^{[I]}	Pilton	England	Worthy Farm
June 29, 2014	Amsterdam	Netherlands	Melkweg
July 1, 2014	Stockholm	Sweden	Lilla Scenen
July 2, 2014	Oslo	Norway	Rockefeller Music Hall
July 4, 2014^{[J]}	Orvieto	Italy	Piazza Duomo
July 5, 2014^{[K]}	Great Tew	England	Great Tew Estate
July 6, 2014	London	England	O_{2} Shepherd's Bush Empire
July 8, 2014	Glasgow	Scotland	O_{2} ABC
July 10, 2014	Dublin	Ireland	The Academy
North America
July 31, 2014	Aspen	United States	Belly Up
August 1, 2014^{[L]}	Castle Pines	United States	Castle Pines Golf Club
August 2, 2014	Denver	United States	Ogden Theatre
August 8, 2014^{[M]}	San Francisco	United States	Lindley Meadow
Europe
September 14, 2014^{[N]}	London	England	Hyde Park
North America
September 25, 2014	Tulsa	United States	Cain's Ballroom
September 26, 2014	Springfield	United States	Gillioz Theatre
September 27, 2014	Chicago	United States	Riviera Theatre
October 1, 2014	Dallas	United States	Granada Theater
October 2, 2014	Houston	United States	Warehouse Live
October 3, 2014	Baton Rouge	United States	Varsity Theatre
October 4, 2014	Birmingham	United States	Alabama Theatre
October 17, 2014	Athens	United States	Georgia Theatre
October 18, 2014	Asheville	United States	The Orange Peel
October 19, 2014	Savannah	United States	Trustees Theater
October 23, 2014	New Braunfels	United States	Gruene Hall
October 24, 2014	New Braunfels	United States	Gruene Hall
October 26, 2014^{[O]}	Las Vegas	United States	Downtown Las Vegas Event Center
November 15, 2014^{[P]}	Durham	United States	Durham Performing Arts Center
December 13, 2014^{[Q]}	Nashville	United States	Ryman Auditorium
February 12, 2015	Norfolk	United States	Norva Theatre
February 13, 2015	Durham	United States	Carolina Theatre
February 14, 2015	Baltimore	United States	Rams Head Live!
February 19, 2015	Madison	United States	Orpheum Theatre
February 20, 2015	Minneapolis	United States	State Theatre
February 21, 2015	Milwaukee	United States	Pabst Theater
February 26, 2015	Louisville	United States	Brown Theatre
February 27, 2015	Knoxville	United States	Tennessee Theatre
February 28, 2015	Richmond	United States	National Theater
March 26, 2015	Washington, D.C.	United States	9:30 Club
March 27, 2015	Providence	United States	Lupo's Heartbreak Hotel
March 28, 2015	Buffalo	United States	Town Ballroom
March 29, 2015	Utica	United States	Jorgensen Athletic and Event Center
April 8, 2015	Ann Arbor	United States	Michigan Theater
April 10, 2015	Ottawa	Canada	Centrepointe Theatre
April 11, 2015	Toronto	Canada	Danforth Music Hall
April 21, 2015	Austin	United States	Tricky Falls
April 22, 2015	Tucson	United States	Rialto Theatre
April 24, 2015^{[R]}	Indio	United States	Empire Polo Club
April 25, 2015	Oakland	United States	Fox Oakland Theatre
April 26, 2015	Santa Margarita	United States	Pozo Saloon
May 1, 2015	Fort Worth	United States	Billy Bob's Texas
May 2, 2015	Helotes	United States	Floore's Country Store
May 3, 2015^{[S]}	New Orleans	United States	Fair Grounds Race Course

Festivals and other miscellaneous performances
^{A} This concert was a part of the "Ocean City Sunfest"
^{B} This concert was a part of "Farm Aid"
^{C} This concert was a part of the "Southern Ground Music & Food Festival"
^{D} This concert was a part of the "8 Man Jam"
^{E} This concert was a part of the "Harvest Music Festival"
^{F} This concert was a part of the "State Fair of Texas"
^{G} This concert was a part of "We Can Survive"
^{H} This concert was a part of the "Christmas Jam"
^{I} This concert was a part of the "Glastonbury Festival"
^{J} This concert was a part of "Orvieto4ever"
^{K} This concert was a part of the "Cornbury Music Festival"
^{L} This concert was a part of "Lulu’s Barkin’ BBQ"
^{M} This concert was a part of "Outside Lands Music and Arts Festival"
^{N} This concert was a part of the "Radio 2 Live in Hyde Park"
^{O} This concert was a part of "Life Is Beautiful"
^{P} This concert was a part of the "Country for Kids Concert"
^{Q} This concert was a part of "Opry at The Ryman"
^{R} This concert was a part of the "Stagecoach Festival"
^{S} This concert was a part of the "New Orleans Jazz & Heritage Festival"

=== Box office score data ===
Venue	City	Tickets sold / Available	Gross revenue
Barrymore Theatre	Madison	900 / 900 (100%)	$21,620
Carolina Theatre	Durham	1,008 / 1,044 (97%)	$36,827
Rams Head Live!	Baltimore	1,609 / 1,609 (100%)	$38,405
9:30 Club	Washington, D.C.	1,200 / 1,200 (100%)	$42,000
Lupo's Heartbreak Hotel	Providence	1,139 / 1,525 (75%)	$34,027
Town Ballroom	Buffalo	790 / 1,000 (79%)	$23,980
Danforth Music Hall	Toronto	1,380 / 1,380 (100%)	$39,573
Fox Oakland Theatre	Oakland	2,411 / 2,800 (86%)	$84,630
TOTAL		10,437 / 11,458 (91%)	$321,062
