= 2013 Country Music Association Awards =

Annual US music awards ceremony

- Date: November 6, 2013
- Location: Bridgestone Arena, Nashville, Tennessee, U.S.
- Hosted by: Brad Paisley; Carrie Underwood

Highlights
- Most wins: Various Artists (2)
- Most nominations: Taylor Swift (6); Kacey Musgraves (6)

Television/radio coverage
- Network: ABC
- Viewership: 16.6 million

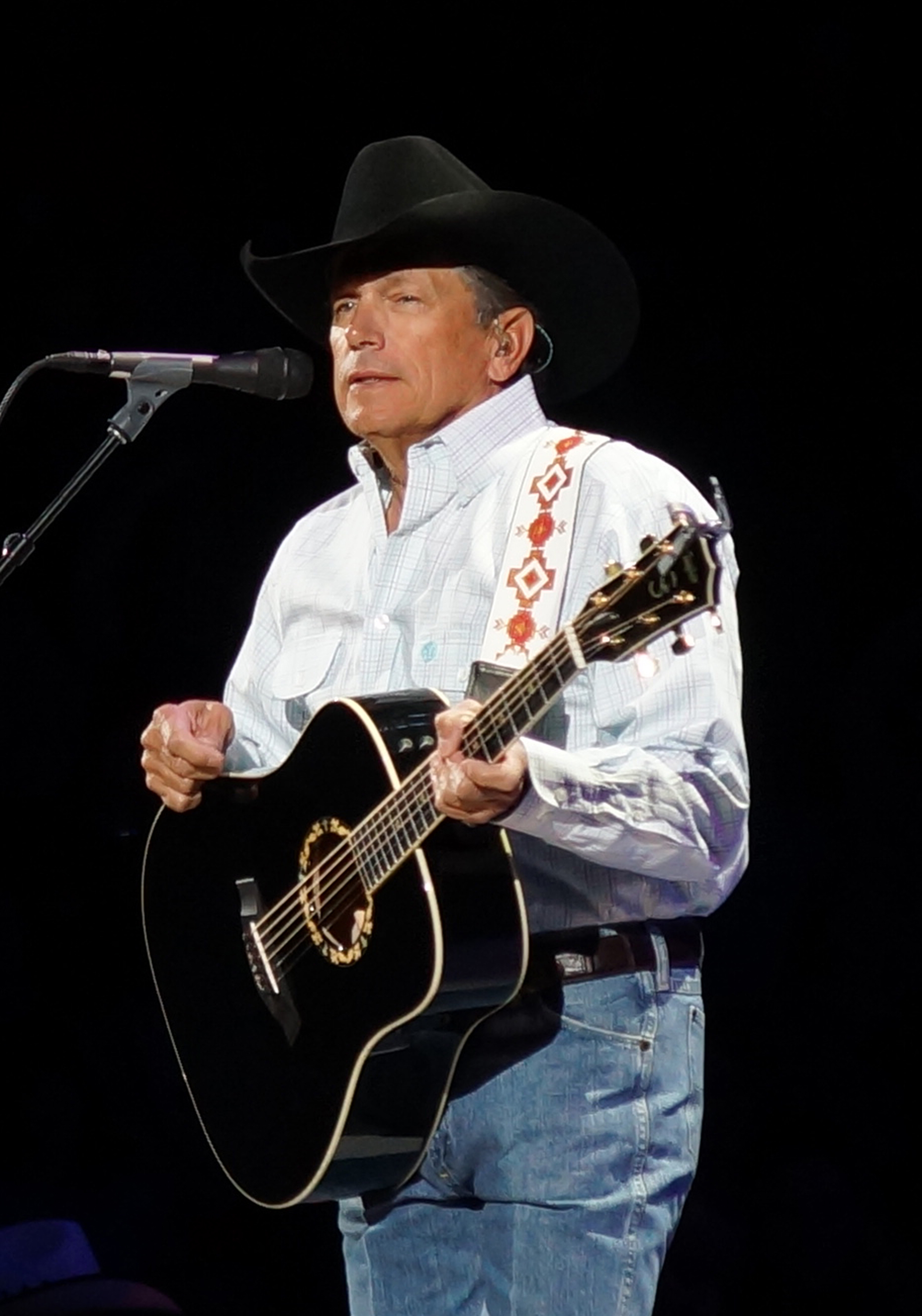
George Strait, Entertainer of the Year recipient.

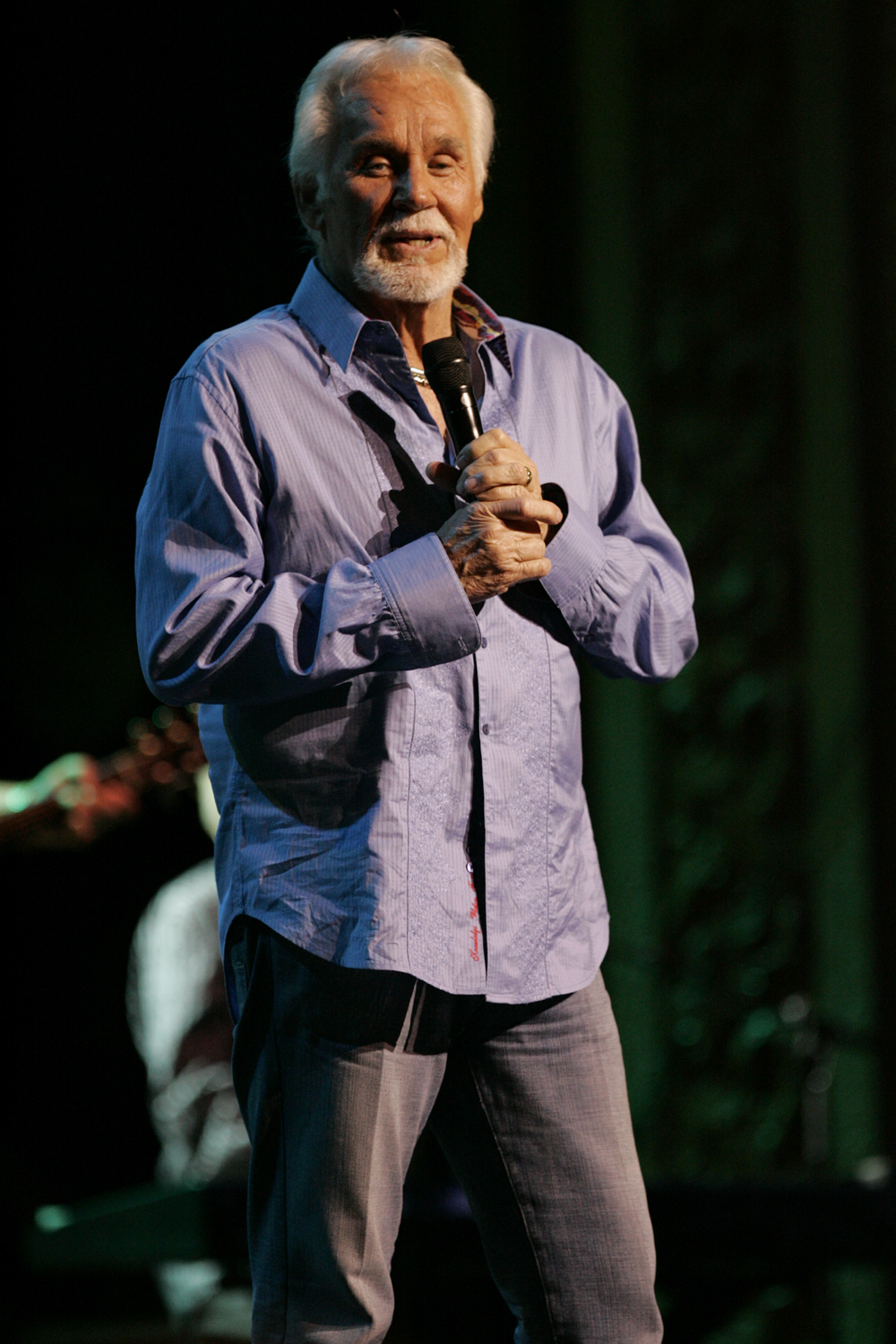
Kenny Rogers, Willie Nelson Lifetime Achievement Award recipient.

The 2013 Country Music Association Awards, 47th Annual Ceremony, is a music award ceremony that was held on November 6, 2013, at the Bridgestone Arena in Nashville, Tennessee. The show was hosted for the sixth consecutive time by Brad Paisley and Carrie Underwood. At the ceremony, Taylor Swift became the second artist ever, and the first woman to receive the Pinnacle Award.

== Winners and nominees ==
Winners are shown in bold.

Entertainer of the Year	Album of the Year
**George Strait**; Jason Aldean; Luke Bryan; Blake Shelton; Taylor Swift	**Based on a True Story...** — **Blake Shelton**; Blown Away — Carrie Underwood; Red — Taylor Swift; Same Trailer Different Park — Kacey Musgraves; Tornado — Little Big Town
Male Vocalist of the Year	Female Vocalist of the Year
**Blake Shelton**; Jason Aldean; Luke Bryan; Eric Church; Keith Urban	**Miranda Lambert**; Kelly Clarkson; Kacey Musgraves; Taylor Swift; Carrie Underwood
Vocal Group of the Year	Vocal Duo of the Year
**Little Big Town**; Eli Young Band; Lady Antebellum; The Band Perry; Zac Brown Band	**Florida Georgia Line**; Big and Rich; Love and Theft; Sugarland; The Civil Wars; Thompson Square
Single of the Year	Song of the Year
**"Cruise"** — **Florida Georgia Line**; "Highway Don't Care" — Tim McGraw, Taylor Swift and Keith Urban; "Mama's Broken Heart" — Miranda Lambert; "Merry Go Round" — Kacey Musgraves; "Wagon Wheel" — Darius Rucker	**"I Drive Your Truck"** — **Jessi Alexander**, **Connie Harrington and** **Jimmy Yeary**; "Mama's Broken Heart" — Brandy Clark, Shane McAnally and Kacey Musgraves; "Merry Go Round" — Kacey Musgraves, Josh Osborne and Shane McAnally; "Pontoon" — Natalie Hemby, Luke Laird and Barry Dean; "Wagon Wheel" — Bob Dylan and Ketch Secor
New Artist of the Year	Musician of the Year
**Kacey Musgraves**; Lee Brice; Brett Eldredge; Florida Georgia Line; Kip Moore	**Mac McAnally, Guitar**; Sam Bush, Mandolin; Paul Franklin, Steel Guitar; Dann Huff, Guitar; Brent Mason, Guitar
Music Video of the Year	Musical Event of the Year
**"Highway Don't Care"** — **Tim McGraw,** **Taylor Swift** **and** **Keith Urban; (Dir. Shane Drake)**; "Blown Away" — Carrie Underwood; (Dir. Randee St. Nicholas); "Boys 'Round Here" — Blake Shelton feat. Pistol Annies and Friends; (Dir. Trey Fanjoy); "Downtown" — Lady Antebellum; (Dir. Peter Zavadil); "Mama's Broken Heart" — Miranda Lambert; (Dir. Trey Fanjoy); "Tornado" — Little Big Town; (Dir. Shane Drake)	**"Highway Don't Care"** — **Tim McGraw and Taylor Swift feat. Keith Urban**; "Boys 'Round Here" — Blake Shelton feat. Pistol Annies and Friends; "Cruise" — Florida Georgia Line ft. Nelly; "Don't Rush" — Kelly Clarkson feat. Vince Gill; "The Only Way I Know" — Jason Aldean, Luke Bryan and Eric Church
Willie Nelson Lifetime Achievement Award
**Kenny Rogers**

=== Special awards ===
Award	Recipient
Pinnacle Award	**Taylor Swift**
International Artist Achievement Award	**Taylor Swift**

== Performers ==
Artist(s)	Song(s)
Luke Bryan; Florida Georgia Line	"That's My Kind of Night" "Cruise"
Kacey Musgraves	"Follow Your Arrow"
Jason Aldean	"Night Train"
Little Big Town	"Sober"
Taylor Swift; Vince Gill; Alison Krauss; Edgar Meyer; Eric Darken	"Red"
Lady Antebellum	"Compass"
Florida Georgia Line	"Round Here"
Miranda Lambert; Keith Urban	"We Were Us"
Tim McGraw	"Southern Girl"
Blake Shelton	"Mine Would Be You"
The Band Perry	"Don't Let Me Be Lonely"
Eric Church	"The Outsiders"
Zac Brown Band; Dave Grohl	"Day For The Dead"
Brad Paisley	"The Mona Lisa"
Jennifer Nettles; Rascal Flatts; Darius Rucker	Willie Nelson Lifetime Achievement Award honoring Kenny Rogers "Sweet Music Man" "Just Dropped In" "The Gambler" "Islands in the Stream"
Luke Bryan	"Drink a Beer"
Alan Jackson; George Strait	"He Stopped Loving Her Today"
Carrie Underwood	"Good Girl" "Blown Away" "Two Black Cadillacs" "See You Again"

== Presenters ==
Presenter(s)	Award
Jake Owen and Lucy Hale	Song of the Year
Willie, Jase, Korie, and Missy Robertson	Single of the Year
Sheryl Crow	Album of the Year
Lee Brice, Brett Eldredge, and Kip Moore	Vocal Duo of the Year
Hunter Hayes and Jason Mraz	New Artist of the Year
Kellie Pickler	Vocal Group of the Year
Kelly Clarkson	Male Vocalist of the Year
Charles Esten and Connie Britton	Female Vocalist of the Year
Robin Roberts	Entertainer of the Year
