= Dime Store Cowgirl =

Single by Kacey Musgraves

from the album Pageant Material
- Released: August 3, 2015
- Genre: Country
- Length: 3:35
- Label: Mercury Nashville
- Songwriters: Kacey Musgraves; Luke Laird; Shane McAnally
- Producers: Kacey Musgraves; Luke Laird; Shane McAnally

Kacey Musgraves singles chronology
"Biscuits" (2015)	"Dime Store Cowgirl" (2015)	"Space Cowboy" / "Butterflies" (2018)

"Dime Store Cowgirl" is a song recorded by American country music artist Kacey Musgraves that serves as the second single from her second major label studio album, Pageant Material. It was released to country radio on August 3, 2015, through Mercury Nashville. The song was written and produced by Musgraves with Luke Laird and Shane McAnally. The song was nominated for "Song of the Year" at the 2016 Americana Music Honors & Awards.

== Title of the song ==
The title of the song originates from when Kacey and her sister, Kelly Musgraves, were a part of the kids band, the Buckaroos. The band had a dress code requiring all the members to wear a cowboy hat; Kacey wore hers cocked back, what she called "pin-up cowgirl-style." In an interview with FADER, Kacey recalled how a mother of another girl she would sing with in the group came up to her and said, 'Don't you wear your hat like that, you're just gonna look like some dimestore cowgirl!' She claims she has always had this thought in the back of her brain, inspiring the name for the song.

== Lyrical interpretation ==
In lyrics of the song, Musgraves goes through the numerous experiences she has had while being on the road and visiting new places. However, in the chorus she says "Cause I'm still the girl from Golden / Had to get away so I could grow / But it don't matter where I'm going / I'll still call my hometown home" This is in reference to her small hometown of Golden, Texas which, in an interview with Country Line Magazine, Musgraves said was a good "springboard" for her career where people always believed in and supported her.

Some of the notable experiences referenced in the song can be found in the verses. In the first verse, Musgraves begins by referencing having her "picture made with Willie Nelson" one of Musgrave's friends and country star who she has gone on tour with several times. She then talks about seeing the saguaro cactus in New Mexico and visiting the US monument Mount Rushmore.

In the second verse, Musgraves sings that she "slept in a room with the ghost of Gram Parsons." Musgraves has elaborated on the meaning of this lyric, saying that she has stayed at "the infamous Joshua Tree Inn" Motel, in California" several times, including filming the video for Follow Your Arrow there. The motel is where 27-year-old singer-songwriter Parsons died of an overdose in 1973. The motel is rumored to be haunted, and Musgraves has said that she felt she had paranormal experiences, such as objects moving/art taken down off the wall. In the same verse, Musgraves describes visiting the River Walk at San Antonio Texas, and the white cliffs of Dover, an iconic white chalk landmark on the English coastline.

In the bridge of the song before the final chorus, Musgraves sings that she is "happy with what I got" drawing the conclusion that although the places she has been and things she has seen might be amazing, she will always be the same girl and think of her hometown as her real home, hence the lyrics, "You can take me out of the country, But you can't take the country out of me."

== Live performances ==
In 2015, Musgraves performed the song at the CMA awards and on Jimmy Kimmel Live!

== Critical reception ==
=== Accolades ===
Publication	Rank	List
RoughStock	3	The Top 30 Singles of 2015

== Awards and nominations ==
Year	Association	Category	Result
2016	Americana Music Honors & Awards	Song of the Year	Nominated

== Chart performance ==
Chart (2015)	Peak position
US Hot Country Songs (Billboard)	44
