= Keep It to Yourself (Kacey Musgraves song) =

Single by Kacey Musgraves

from the album Same Trailer Different Park
- Released: March 10, 2014
- Genre: Country
- Length: 3:17
- Label: Mercury Nashville
- Songwriters: Kacey Musgraves; Shane McAnally; Luke Laird
- Producers: Luke Laird; Shane McAnally; Kacey Musgraves

Kacey Musgraves singles chronology
"Follow Your Arrow" (2013)	"Keep It to Yourself" (2014)	"Biscuits" (2015)

"Keep It to Yourself" is a song written by American country music artist Kacey Musgraves, singer Shane McAnally and songwriter Luke Laird, and sung by Musgraves. It was released on March 10, 2014, as the fourth and final single from Musgraves' debut album, Same Trailer Different Park (2013).

== Content ==
"Keep It to Yourself" is a country song addressed to an ex, speaking of how the narrator does not want to hear how her ex is feeling, because she doesn't want to fall for him again. It is musically and lyrically different from Musgraves's other songs, with a more traditional lyric and slight country pop sound. Musgraves stated: “It’s just about knowing and wanting to know how that person feels about you, like, in a situation, but just knowing that it’s not good for you anymore and that you literally have to be the strong person and say, ‘Don’t tell me, because it’s just going to rope me back in.' It’s just like about getting over that hump, that hard part where you feel like you’re just going to die because this person’s not there anymore. Nobody wants to feel naked or uncomfortable, and removing yourself out of a situation that you know is probably not right is really hard, but it’s something that you just have to do.” Instruments used in this song include guitar, banjo, piano, and pedal steel guitar.

== Critical reception ==
The song received generally favorable reviews. Taste of Country contributors praised how the "understated" love song "takes a familiar experience and makes it sound very unique and very fresh," and "expresses how many feel as they begin to get over a broken relationship," noting that "It’s nice to have a song like this that doesn’t involve violence." 59.29% of readers of the country music blog voted "Keep It to Yourself" 5 stars out of 5. Daryl Addison of Great American Country called it one of the four best songs on the album, saying, "The songwriting is consistently superb while stories tend to take on different angles, as in, “Keep It to Yourself,” a deeply empathetic anti-love song where she’d really just rather be left alone in order to move on."

== Commercial performance ==
The song debuted at No. 56 on the Country Airplay chart for the week ending March 29, 2014.

== Charts ==
=== Weekly charts ===
Chart (2014)	Peak position
Canada Country (Billboard)	48
US Country Airplay (Billboard)	32
US Hot Country Songs (Billboard)	40
