= Biscuits (song) =

Song by American country music artist Kacey Musgraves

Single by Kacey Musgraves

from the album Pageant Material
- Released: March 16, 2015
- Genre: Country
- Length: 3:18
- Label: Mercury Nashville
- Songwriters: Kacey Musgraves; Shane McAnally; Brandy Clark
- Producers: Kacey Musgraves; Shane McAnally; Luke Laird

Kacey Musgraves singles chronology
"Keep It to Yourself" (2014)	"Biscuits" (2015)	"Dime Store Cowgirl" (2015)

"Biscuits" is a song recorded by American country music artist Kacey Musgraves that serves as the lead single from her second major label studio album, Pageant Material. It was released to country radio on March 16, 2015, through Mercury Nashville and was released to digital retailers the following day. The song was written and produced by Musgraves and Shane McAnally, with additional songwriting by Brandy Clark and additional production by Luke Laird. In December 2015, Billboard ranked "Biscuits" number one on its "10 Best Country Songs of 2015" list and number 16 on its list of the 25 best songs of 2015 across all genres.

Despite its official release date of March 16, "Biscuits" was tied for the tenth most-added song at American country radio for the week of March 9, 2015, and as a result debuted on the Billboard Country Airplay chart that week at number 56.

== Content ==
"Biscuits" is a mid-tempo country song with lyrics revolving around individualism and minding one's own business. The song was written by Musgraves, Shane McAnally, and Brandy Clark, the same songwriting team behind her 2013 hit "Follow Your Arrow", which numerous critics have noted is similar to "Biscuits". UK music blog The Guardian noted the song's effective use of language and imagery to get its message across "about what it means truly to blaze your own trail in spite of others' judgment" and Musgraves' everyperson appeal. "Musgraves has a way of making people feel special," writes Grady Smith, "not by telling them that they’re special, but by reminding them that no one really is."

== Music video ==
The music video was directed by Marc Klasfeld and premiered in June 2015. The video was nominated for Music Video of the Year at the 2015 CMA Awards.

== Critical reception ==
Billboard ranked "Biscuits" at number 16 on its year-end list for 2015: "Musgraves, who many have compared to a modern-day Loretta Lynn, scored a triumphant note with this banjo-backed warning to keep out of other people's business. As usual, it's done in her tell-it-like-you-see-it style."

=== Accolades ===
Year	Association	Category	Result
2015	CMA Awards	Video of the Year	Nominated
2016	ACM Awards	Video of the Year	Nominated
2016	CMT Music Awards	Female Video of the Year	Nominated

Publication	Rank	List
Billboard	1	10 Best Country Songs of 2015
Billboard	N/A	Top 10 Songs of 2015 (So Far)
Billboard	16	Top 25 Songs of 2015
Nashville Scene	23	Best Country Singles of 2015
Rolling Stone	46	50 Best Songs of 2015

== Chart performance ==
"Biscuits" debuted at number 56 on the Billboard Country Airplay chart for the week ending March 21, 2015. Two weeks later, after its release for sale, it debuted at number 22 on the Bubbling Under Hot 100 and number 28 on the Hot Country Songs for charts dated April 4, 2015, and sold 25,000 copies in its debut week. The song has sold 117,000 copies in the US as of June 2015.

== Charts ==
=== Weekly charts ===
Chart (2015)	Peak position
Canada Country (Billboard)	36
US Bubbling Under Hot 100 (Billboard)	21
US Country Airplay (Billboard)	41
US Hot Country Songs (Billboard)	28

=== Year-end charts ===
Chart (2015)	Position
US Hot Country Songs (Billboard)	90

== Certifications ==
Region	Certification	Certified units/sales
United States (RIAA)	Gold	500,000^{‡}
^{‡} Sales+streaming figures based on certification alone.

== Release history ==
Country	Date	Format	Label	Ref.
United States	March 16, 2015	Country radio	Mercury Nashville	
Canada	March 17, 2015	Digital download	Mercury Nashville	
United Kingdom	March 17, 2015	Digital download	Mercury Nashville	
United States	March 17, 2015	Digital download	Mercury Nashville	
