= A Very Kacey Christmas =

- Digital cover

Studio album by Kacey Musgraves
- Released: October 28, 2016
- Recorded: 2016
- Genres: Country; Christmas
- Length: 37:43
- Label: Mercury Nashville
- Producers: Kacey Musgraves; Misa Arriaga; Kyle Ryan

Kacey Musgraves chronology
Pageant Material (2015)	A Very Kacey Christmas (2016)	Golden Hour (2018)

A Very Kacey Christmas is the third studio album and first Christmas album by American country music artist Kacey Musgraves, released on October 28, 2016, through Mercury Nashville. Overall, it is Musgraves' sixth album, her third studio album, and first Christmas album. Produced by Musgraves, Kyle Ryan and Misa Arriaga, it features eight traditional Christmas songs and four originals. Special guest artists include Willie Nelson, The Quebe Sisters and Leon Bridges.

== Background and recording ==
Musgraves first announced she was working on a Christmas album on June 1, 2016, before a formal announcement came on September 7, 2016. In an interview with Rolling Stone published on September 8, 2016, Musgraves called working on the album "one of the most enriching musical experiences." On recording the album, she states, "I really wanted to create a whimsical throwback holiday record, one that evokes feelings of nostalgia and simpler times. I think that the fine musicians and brains that were a part of this project have helped me create a body of music that can be added to people's classic collections."

Musgraves describes the album as "part western swing sprinkled with bits of classic pop, hazy Hawaiian moments and child-like fun that all comes to a nostalgic, melancholy end and ultimately is very 'me,'" and adds, "There can be a touch of sad feelings and memories during the holiday season for a lot of people so I knew when I went in to write I wanted to include all the emotions this time of year can bring out."

== Promotion ==
In support of the album, Musgraves embarked on the "A Very Kacey Christmas" tour. It began November 26, 2016, in Windsor, Ontario, and concluded on December 21, 2016, in Fort Worth, TX. The tour's production was bigger than a typical Musgraves tour. In addition to her band it featured a strings section, an accordion, bass, saxophone, clarinet and backup singers.

Promotional appearances in the media included a performance of "Mele Kalikimaka" and "Christmas Makes Me Cry" on CMA's Country Christmas 2016 TV special. Musgraves also performed live on Good Morning America on November 30, 2016, The Tonight Show Starring Jimmy Fallon on December 1, 2016, The Talk on December 5, 2016, and on Late Night with Seth Meyers on December 7, 2016.

== Critical reception ==
Professional ratings
Aggregate scores
Source	Rating
Metacritic	82/100
Review scores
Source	Rating
AllMusic	4.5/5 stars
Belfast Telegraph	8/10
Evening Standard	4/5 stars
Financial Times	3/5 stars
Los Angeles Times	3/4 stars
Pitchfork	6.8/10
Q	4/5 stars
Vice (Expert Witness)	(2-star Honorable Mention)

A Very Kacey Christmas received universal acclaim from music critics. At Metacritic, which assigns a normalised rating out of 100 to reviews from mainstream critics, the album has an average score of 82 based on 4 reviews, indicating "universal acclaim". Stephen Thomas Erlewine of AllMusic rated the album four and a half out of five stars and calls it "a sharp, playful, and warm holiday record, the kind that evokes the past while feeling fresh and seeming destined for many years of annual spins." Writing for Pitchfork and rating the album 6.8 out of 10, Marc Hogan states the album "glides naturally from her established Western-swing throwback aesthetic to kitschy exotica and vintage pop, with an expertly curated song selection that leans on campy novelties, classy standards, and a stocking’s worth of originals."

Entertainment Weekly ranked the album 12th on its list of the "Best Christmas Albums of all Time", writing that the album "blends the festive joy of the season with just the right touch of her signature melancholia". In 2022 Billboard listed This Christmas Day as the 7th "Best Christmas Albums of the 21st Century".

== Track listing ==
Source: AllMusic

No.	Title	Writer(s)	Length
1.	"Have Yourself a Merry Little Christmas"	Hugh Martin, Ralph Blane	3:01
2.	"Let It Snow" (featuring The Quebe Sisters)	Sammy Cahn, Jule Styne	2:23
3.	"Christmas Don't Be Late"	Ross Bagdasarian Sr.	2:11
4.	"A Willie Nice Christmas" (featuring Willie Nelson and Trigger)	Kacey Musgraves, Shane McAnally, Josh Osborne	3:24
5.	"Feliz Navidad"	José Feliciano	3:22
6.	"Christmas Makes Me Cry"	Musgraves, McAnally, Brandy Clark	2:47
7.	"Present Without a Bow" (featuring Leon Bridges)	Musgraves, Leon Bridges, Austin Jenkins, Luke Laird	3:52
8.	"Mele Kalikimaka" (featuring The Quebe Sisters)	Robert Alexander Anderson	2:53
9.	"I Want a Hippopotamus for Christmas"	John Rox	2:26
10.	"Rudolph the Red-Nosed Reindeer"	Johnny Marks	3:26
11.	"Ribbons and Bows"	Musgraves, Julia Michaels, Justin Tranter	3:30
12.	"What Are You Doing New Year's Eve?"	Frank Loesser	4:28
Total length:			37:43

== Personnel ==
Credits adapted from AllMusic.

Musicians

- Misa Arriaga – bells, acoustic guitar, gut string guitar, background vocals
- Leon Bridges – vocals
- Cohen Dabbs – background vocals
- Veda Dabbs – background vocals
- Fred Eltringham – drums, percussion
- Larry Franklin – background vocals
- Paul Franklin – pedal steel guitar
- Joshua Hedley – sleigh bells
- Rory Hoffman – accordion, clarinet, bass clarinet, guitar, upright piano, baritone saxophone, whistling
- Gena Johnson – background vocals
- Adam Keafer – bass guitar, upright bass
- Dallas McVey – background vocals
- Kacey Musgraves – vocals, whistling
- Willie Nelson – vocals, guitar
- The Quebe Sisters – fiddle, background vocals
- Jimmy Rowland – Hammond B3, Mellotron, piano, Wurlitzer
- Kyle Ryan – autoharp, electric guitar, percussion, piano, sleigh bells, ukulele, vibraphone, background vocals
- Chris Scruggs – lap steel guitar, requinto
- Kenny Sears – background vocals
- Nathaniel Smith – cello
- Joe Spivey – background vocals

Technical personnel

- Misa Arriaga – producer
- Steve Chadie – engineer
- Ryan Gore – engineer, mixing
- Gena Johnson – assistant engineer, engineer, production coordinator
- Andrew Mendelson – mastering
- Kacey Musgraves – art direction, producer
- Mark Petaccia – engineer
- Kyle Ryan – producer
- Chris Stapleton – assistant engineer
- Kelly Christine Sutton – art direction, design, photography
- James Taylor – assistant engineer

== Charts ==
A Very Kacey Christmas debuted at No. 143 on the Billboard 200, selling 4,800 copies in its first week of release. The album reached a new peak position of 97 on the Billboard 200 chart dated December 17, 2016. It later re-entered the charts on December 14, 2019 alongside Musgraves new Christmas special The Kacey Musgraves Christmas Special, reaching a new peak of 21. As of January 2017 the album has sold 55,100 copies in the US.

=== Weekly charts ===
Chart (2016–2019)	Peak position
US Billboard 200	21
US Top Country Albums (Billboard)	11
US Top Holiday Albums (Billboard)	9

=== Year-end charts ===
Chart (2017)	Position
US Top Country Albums (Billboard)	80
US Top Current Albums (Billboard)	195

Chart (2020)	Position
US Top Country Albums (Billboard)	94

== Release history ==
Region	Date	Format(s)	Label	Ref.
United States	October 28, 2016	CD; DL; LP	Mercury Nashville	
