= Blowin' Smoke =

Single by Kacey Musgraves

from the album Same Trailer Different Park
- Released: April 1, 2013
- Genre: Country rock
- Length: 3:08
- Label: Mercury Nashville
- Songwriters: Luke Laird; Shane McAnally; Kacey Musgraves
- Producers: Luke Laird; Shane McAnally; Kacey Musgraves

Kacey Musgraves singles chronology
"Merry Go 'Round" (2012)	"Blowin' Smoke" (2013)	"Follow Your Arrow" (2013)

"Blowin' Smoke" is a song co-written and recorded by American country music singer Kacey Musgraves, featured on her major label debut album, Same Trailer Different Park. It was released April 1, 2013, as the album's second single. It was written and produced by Musgraves, Luke Laird, and Shane McAnally. As of July 10, 2013, the single has sold 135,000 copies in the United States.

== Content ==
The song is about a waitress who is "down on her luck" and aspires to do better, but is "just blowin' smoke". The title is a double meaning, referencing the fact that the waitress is smoking a cigarette while also playing on the term "blowing smoke", which Musgraves refers to as meaning "talking shit".

The song opens and closes with the ambient noise of a Waffle House restaurant, recorded by co-writer and co-producer Luke Laird.

== Critical reception ==
Billy Dukes at Taste of Country said "every element of 'Blowin' Smoke' works together to fill in gaps in a listener’s mind, especially one who’s never behind the bar or in front of a line cook, nervously tapping on a steel counter while their table’s food is prepared. The peculiarity of subject matter may prevent this single from being a chart-topper, but one gets the feeling that’s not the singer’s measure of success anyway". Matt Bjorke at Roughstock said the song "features an interesting story about how we all say we're gonna do things and change our lives but we end up not doing it. It's honest and real, unlike so much of Today's music". Daryl Addison at GAC says "Kacey sings with more than a hint of her character’s jealous contempt, we’re all out here talkin’ trash, makin’ bets, lips wrapped ’round our cigarettes, when a fellow waitress follows her heart to Vegas.

== Music video ==
The music video was directed by Honey and premiered on CMT and GAC in May 2013.

== Chart performance ==
"Blowin' Smoke" debuted at number 56 on Billboard's Country Airplay chart for the week of April 13, 2013. It also debuted at number 48 on Billboard's Hot Country Songs chart for the week of April 27, 2013. It also debuted at number 10 on the U.S. Billboard Bubbling Under Hot 100 Singles chart for the week of June 22, 2013.

== Charts ==
=== Weekly charts ===
Chart (2013)	Peak position
Canada Country (Billboard)	46
US Bubbling Under Hot 100 (Billboard)	7
US Country Airplay (Billboard)	23
US Hot Country Songs (Billboard)	31

=== Year-end charts ===
Chart (2013)	Position
US Country Airplay (Billboard)	95
US Hot Country Songs (Billboard)	91

== Certifications ==
Region	Certification	Certified units/sales
United States (RIAA)	Platinum	1,000,000^{‡}
^{‡} Sales+streaming figures based on certification alone.
