= Kacey Musgraves =

American singer-songwriter (born 1988)

- Musgraves in 2024

Background information
- Born: Kacey Lee Musgraves; August 21, 1988 (age 38); Sulphur Springs, Texas, US
- Origin: Mineola, Texas, US
- Genres: Country; pop; folk
- Occupations: Singer; songwriter; musician
- Instruments: Vocals; guitar; banjo; mandolin; harmonica; keyboards
- Years active: 1999–present
- Labels: Mercury Nashville; MCA Nashville; Interscope; Lost Highway
- Spouse: Ruston Kelly (m. 2017; div. 2020)
- Awards: Full list
- Website: kaceymusgraves.com

Kacey Lee Musgraves (born August 21, 1988) is an American singer and songwriter. She began her career in the early 2000s, when she self-released three solo albums and recorded another album as a member of the duo Texas Two Bits. In 2007, Musgraves appeared on the fifth season of the USA Network singing competition Nashville Star, where she finished in seventh place. In 2012, she signed with Mercury Nashville and released the hit single "Merry Go 'Round". Her major-label debut studio album, Same Trailer Different Park (2013), won the Grammy Award for Best Country Album at the 56th Annual Grammy Awards.

Musgraves's second studio album, Pageant Material (2015), debuted at number three on the Billboard 200 chart and yielded the critically and commercially successful singles "Biscuits" and "Dime Store Cowgirl". She released a Christmas-themed album, A Very Kacey Christmas (2016). Her fourth studio album Golden Hour (2018) was released to widespread critical acclaim and won all four of its nominated Grammy Award categories, including Album of the Year and Best Country Album. The album's first two singles, "Space Cowboy" and "Butterflies", won the Grammy Award for Best Country Song and Best Country Solo Performance, respectively.

Musgraves's fifth studio album, Star-Crossed (2021), became her fourth top-ten album on the Billboard 200. In 2023, she was featured on the single "I Remember Everything" by Zach Bryan, which debuted at number one on the Billboard Hot 100 chart, and won a Grammy Award for Best Country Duo/Group Performance. Her sixth studio album, Deeper Well (2024), peaked at number two on the Billboard 200, and the album's single "The Architect" won the Grammy Award for Best Country Song. Musgraves has won eight Grammy Awards, seven Country Music Association Awards, and four Academy of Country Music Awards.

== Early life ==
Kacey Lee Musgraves was born August 21, 1988, in Sulphur Springs, Texas, and grew up in Golden, Texas. Her parents are Karen (née Abrams), an artist, and Craig Musgraves, owner of a small printing business, M-Prints Printing, Inc., in Mineola, Texas. Kacey said that she was born six weeks prematurely and weighed only five pounds. She has a younger sister, Kelly Christine Sutton (née Musgraves), who is a photographer and at times has photographed some of Kacey's work including in the Cotswolds in South West England.

Kacey Musgraves started writing songs at age eight. Her first song, "Notice Me," was for her elementary-school graduation. She first learned to play music on the mandolin, then at age 12 started taking guitar lessons from a local musician named John DeFoore, which she later described as "one of the most important things that ever happened to me." DeFoore also taught guitar to Miranda Lambert and Riley Thompson. Musgraves learned harmonica too.

Musgraves' mother took her to local music festivals to sing western swing music. She and co-student Alina Tatum formed country-music duo Texas Two Bits in 1999, toured through Texas, and released an independent album in 2000, and earned an invitation to perform at President George W. Bush's "Black Tie and Boots Inaugural Ball". Musgraves also won yodeling national championships and was selected to sing the national anthem at the 2002 Winter Olympics. At age 14, her family funded her first solo, self-released album. She graduated from Mineola High School in Mineola, Texas northwest of Tyler in 2006 and moved to Austin at 18. In 2007, Musgraves competed on Season 5 of the singing competition reality TV series Nashville Star, where she placed seventh. To sustain herself she took various jobs, including performing as Hannah Montana for children's birthday parties.

== Career ==
=== 2008–2014: Debut ===
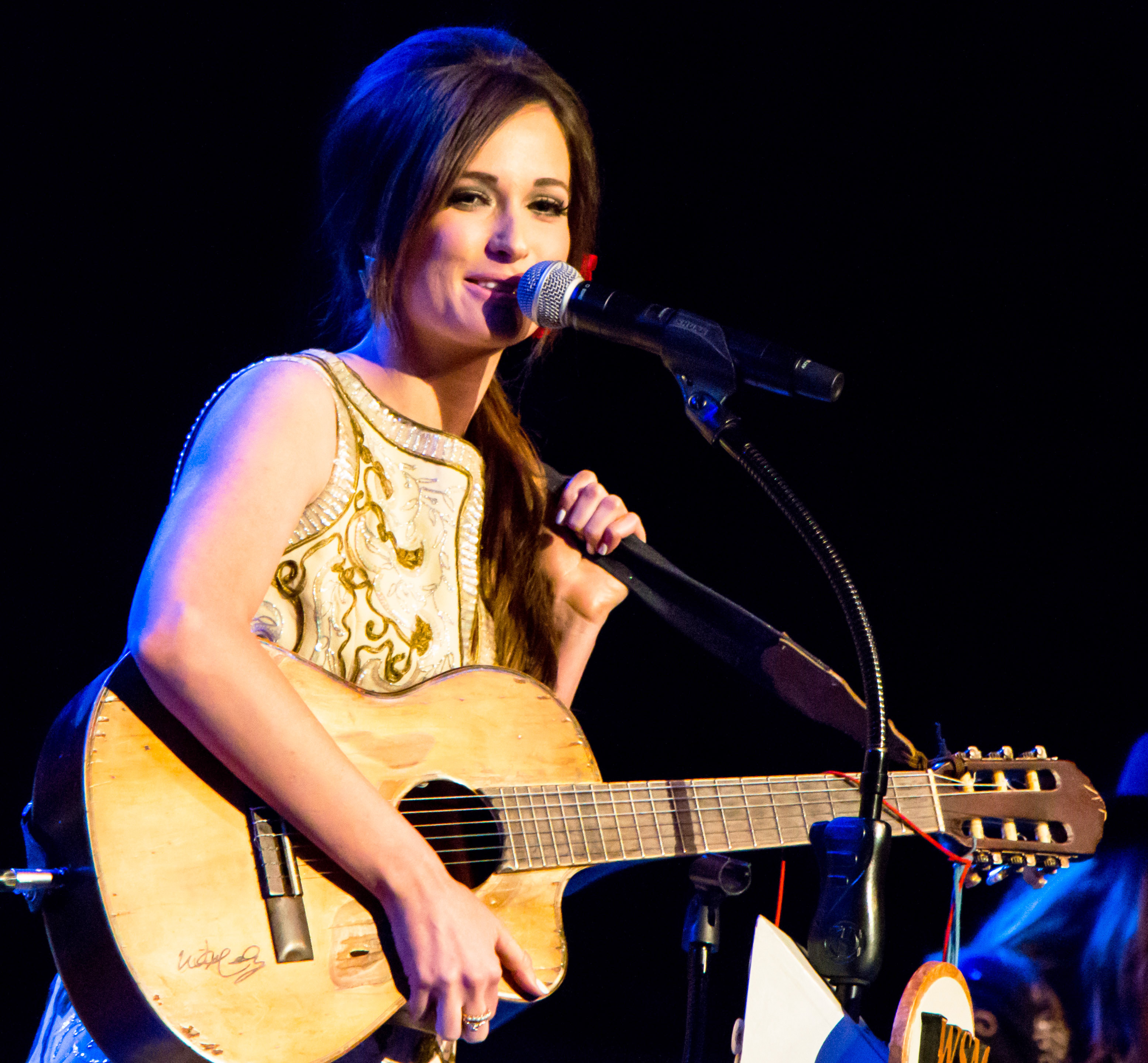
Musgraves performing in 2014

Musgraves recorded three self-produced albums in 2002, 2003, and 2007. While living in Austin in 2008, she recorded two songs for independent record label Triple Pop. She collaborated with the Josh Abbott Band in 2010 on the song "Oh, Tonight". Musgraves' two acoustic recordings for Triple Pop (covers of OneRepublic's "Apologize" and Miley Cyrus' "See You Again") are available on a digital EP released in 2012. "Apologize" (Acoustic Version) charted in the Billboard Hot Singles Chart at No. 23 on February 15, 2014, and racked up over 31,000,000 streams on Spotify. To commemorate the 10-year anniversary on March 30, 2018, Triple Pop released the "Acoustic Remixed" digital EP, which featured newly remixed and remastered versions of the same recordings.

Musgraves joined Lady A on the European leg of their Own the Night Tour in 2012. In 2012, she signed with Mercury Nashville and released her solo debut single "Merry Go 'Round". The song is included on her major-label debut album Same Trailer Different Park, produced and co-written by Musgraves, Shane McAnally and Luke Laird and released on March 19, 2013. The album debuted at number 2, selling 42,000 copies. It produced additional hit singles in "Blowin' Smoke" and "Follow Your Arrow". Rolling Stone magazine listed "Follow Your Arrow" at number 39 of its list of 100 Greatest Country Songs of All Time, and said that Musgraves was "one of the loudest symbols of young country musicians embracing progressive values." "Undermine", a song co-written by Musgraves and Trent Dabbs, was featured in one of the first episodes in the first season of the television series Nashville on October 17, 2012. Musgraves co-wrote Miranda Lambert's 2013 single "Mama's Broken Heart" and sang harmony on the song.

Musgraves was nominated for four awards at the 47th Annual Academy of Country Music Awards in 2012, including Female Vocalist of the Year. Musgraves was also nominated for four Grammy Awards at the 56th Annual Grammy Awards, tying Taylor Swift and Lorde for the most nominations received by a woman that year. Those nominations included Best New Artist, Best Country Album (Same Trailer Different Park), and Best Country Song for both "Mama's Broken Heart" and "Merry Go 'Round". "Merry Go 'Round" won the Best Country Song Grammy award, and Same Trailer Different Park won in Best Country Album.

Musgraves joined Katy Perry on the North American leg of her Prismatic World Tour as well as Willie Nelson and Alison Krauss on select dates during their tour. Musgraves provided backing vocals for "Bourbon in Kentucky", the lead single on Dierks Bentley's 2013 album Riser. In April 2014, Musgraves won the Academy of Country Music award for album of the year for Same Trailer Different Park. In June 2014, she released a new song called The Trailer Song, which she debuted on The Tonight Show Starring Jimmy Fallon. Same Trailer Different Park was certified gold in August 2014 for selling over 500,000 copies. Musgraves' single "Follow Your Arrow" was also certified gold, and "Merry Go Round" was certified platinum.

=== 2015–2017: Early album releases ===
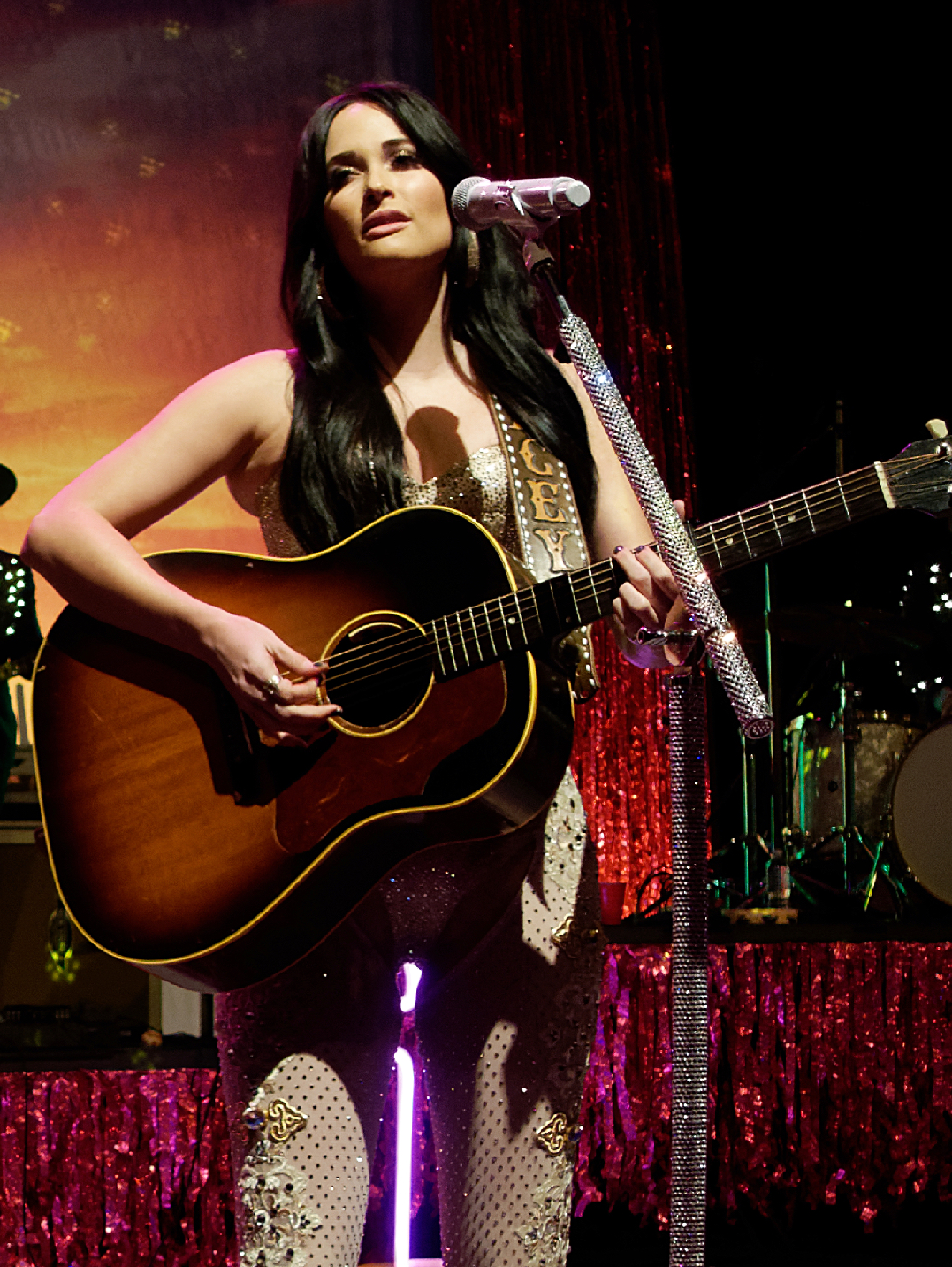
Musgraves performing live at The Greek Theater in Griffith Park, Los Angeles, September 2016

Musgraves announced in late August 2014 that she would perform a 10-show headlining tour, titled Same Tour Different Trailer, which started on September 25 and ended on October 19. In September 2014, she said that she had begun writing songs for her second major label album, and planned to write with Luke Laird and Shane MacAnally later in the year after her touring schedule wrapped. "Biscuits", the lead single from the album, was released on March 16, 2015.

Pageant Material, Musgraves' second studio album, was released on June 23, 2015. To support the album, Musgraves performed on The Tonight Show Starring Jimmy Fallon (June 9, 2015), Late Night with Seth Meyers (June 10, 2015), Good Morning America (June 23, 2015), The View (June 24, 2015), Jimmy Kimmel Live! (September 14, 2015), The Late Show with Stephen Colbert (January 8, 2016), and The Late Late Show with James Corden (April 6, 2016).

Musgraves was featured on a remix of Miguel's single "Waves", released on February 26, 2016. On September 7, 2016, Musgraves announced the release of her first Christmas album, A Very Kacey Christmas. The album, which features eight traditional and four original songs, was released on October 28, 2016, through Mercury Nashville. In support of the album, Musgraves embarked on a Christmas-themed tour, complete with a strings section, an accordion, a bass, a saxophone, a clarinet, and backup singers. In September 2016, Musgraves was selected as one of 30 country music artists to perform on "Forever Country", a mash-up track of "Take Me Home, Country Roads", "On the Road Again", and "I Will Always Love You". The song celebrates 50 years of the CMA Awards and secured Musgraves her first number-one country single.

In 2017, Musgraves provided backing vocals on "All the Best", a John Prine cover, for Zac Brown Band's album Welcome Home. Also in 2017, Musgraves was featured on Outlaw: Celebrating the Music of Waylon Jennings. Originally recorded for TV, it later was released on CD and DVD. During the broadcast, Musgraves performed Jennings' song "The Wurlitzer Prize". Musgraves appeared on the June 21, 2017, episode of Hollywood Medium with Tyler Henry to receive a psychic reading and connect with her grandmother, Barbara Taylor, to learn more details about her death in a house fire. Musgraves has said that her song "This Town", from the album Pageant Material, is about her grandmother, and that her grandmother sings during the opening of the song.

=== 2018–2020: Breakthrough ===
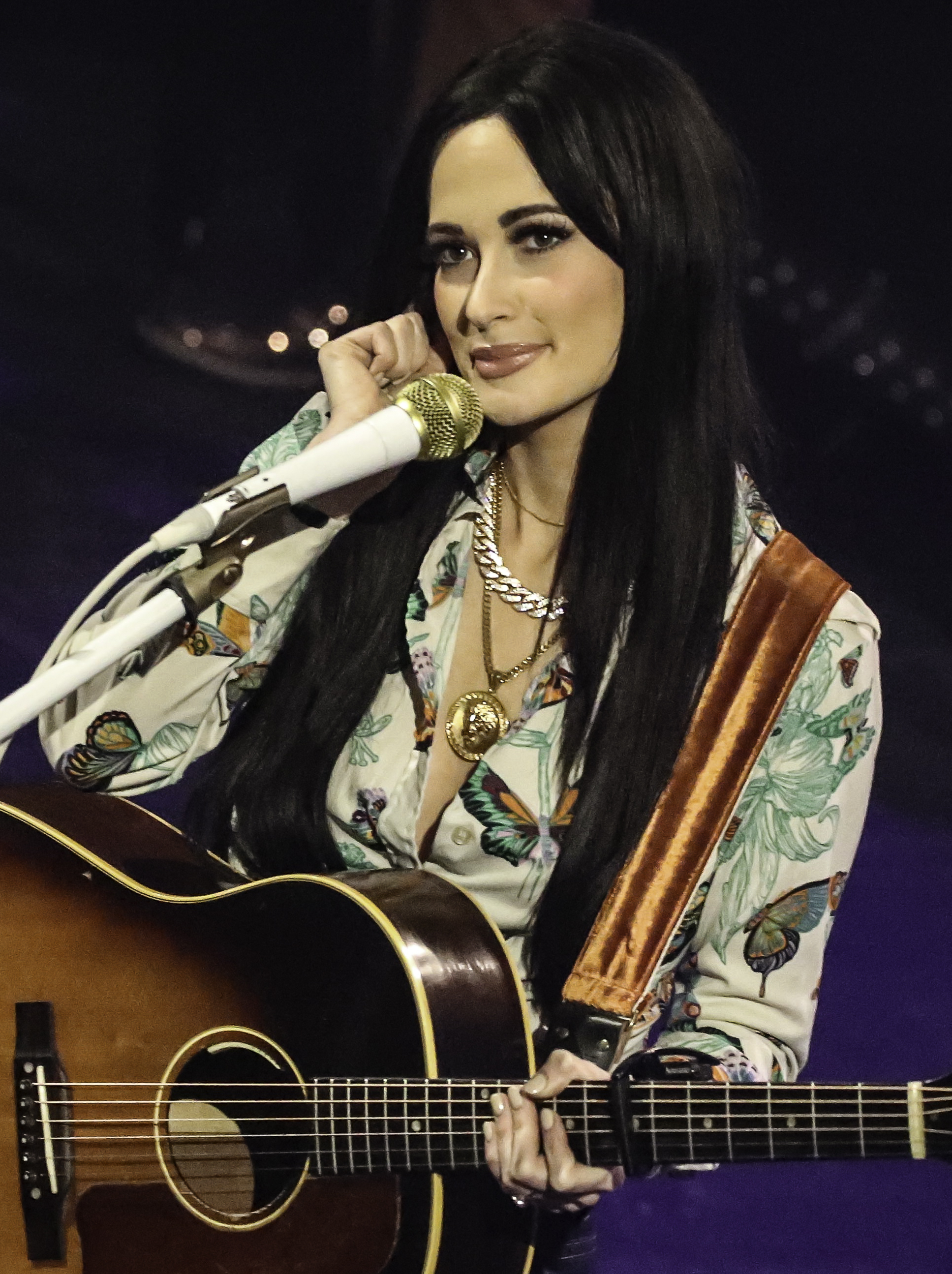
Musgraves performing at the Palace Theatre in Saint Paul, Minnesota in February 2019

In October 2017, Musgraves posted a picture of herself on Twitter indicating she was in the studio writing new songs for her upcoming third studio album. On December 12, 2017, Musgraves announced the title of her third studio album Golden Hour through Entertainment Weekly. The songs "Butterflies" and "Space Cowboy" were released as the first singles from the album on February 23, 2018. In March, Musgraves headlined the 2018 C2C: Country to Country festival in London after playing the festival in 2016.

Musgraves premiered "High Horse", the third song from the album, on March 22, 2018, on Zane Lowe's Beats 1 Apple Radio show. On March 29, 2018, she performed "Slow Burn" on The Late Show with Stephen Colbert. Golden Hour was released on March 30, 2018, on MCA Nashville. On May 12, 2018, Musgraves was the musical guest on Saturday Night Live, performing "High Horse" and "Slow Burn". Through June and July, Musgraves was the opening act on the second North American leg of Harry Styles: Live on Tour. In September, Musgraves appeared on a rerecorded version of "There's No Gettin' Over Me" with Ronnie Milsap for his 2019 duet album. On October 2, 2018, she appeared on Jimmy Kimmel Live! as the musical guest. In October 2018, Musgraves embarked on the Oh, What a World Tour in support of Golden Hour. The tour began in Oslo, Norway on October 13.

In February 2019, at the 61st Annual Grammy Awards, Golden Hour won Album of the Year and Best Country Album. That same month, Musgraves released "Rainbow" as the fifth single from the album. In April, Musgraves featured on a newly recorded version of "Neon Moon" with Brooks and Dunn for their duet album Reboot. She also made a cameo appearance as herself in the country-music drama film Wild Rose, released in April. In May, Musgraves made her Met Gala debut as a Barbie doll and afterwards announced she had signed with modeling agency IMG. In August, Musgraves appeared at San Francisco's Outside Lands Music and Arts Festival, among her largest festival appearances to date. In October 2019, Musgraves revealed that she would cover the song "All Is Found" for Frozen II. The song plays over the end credits and is also included on the soundtrack album.

On November 4, 2019, Musgraves announced The Kacey Musgraves Christmas Show, a holiday special premiering through Amazon Amazon Prime Video on November 29. On November 20, 2019, she debuted the song "Glittery" featuring Troye Sivan on The Tonight Show Starring Jimmy Fallon. The soundtrack to the show includes collaborations with other artists, including a cover of "I'll Be Home for Christmas" together with singer Lana Del Rey. The show also stars Kacey's grandmother Barbara (Nana) Musgraves. In April 2020, she appeared in the Together at Home virtual concert series and performed "Rainbow". That same month, she released an Earth Day inspired remix of "Oh, What a World".

=== 2020–2025: Star-Crossed, Deeper Well and other projects ===
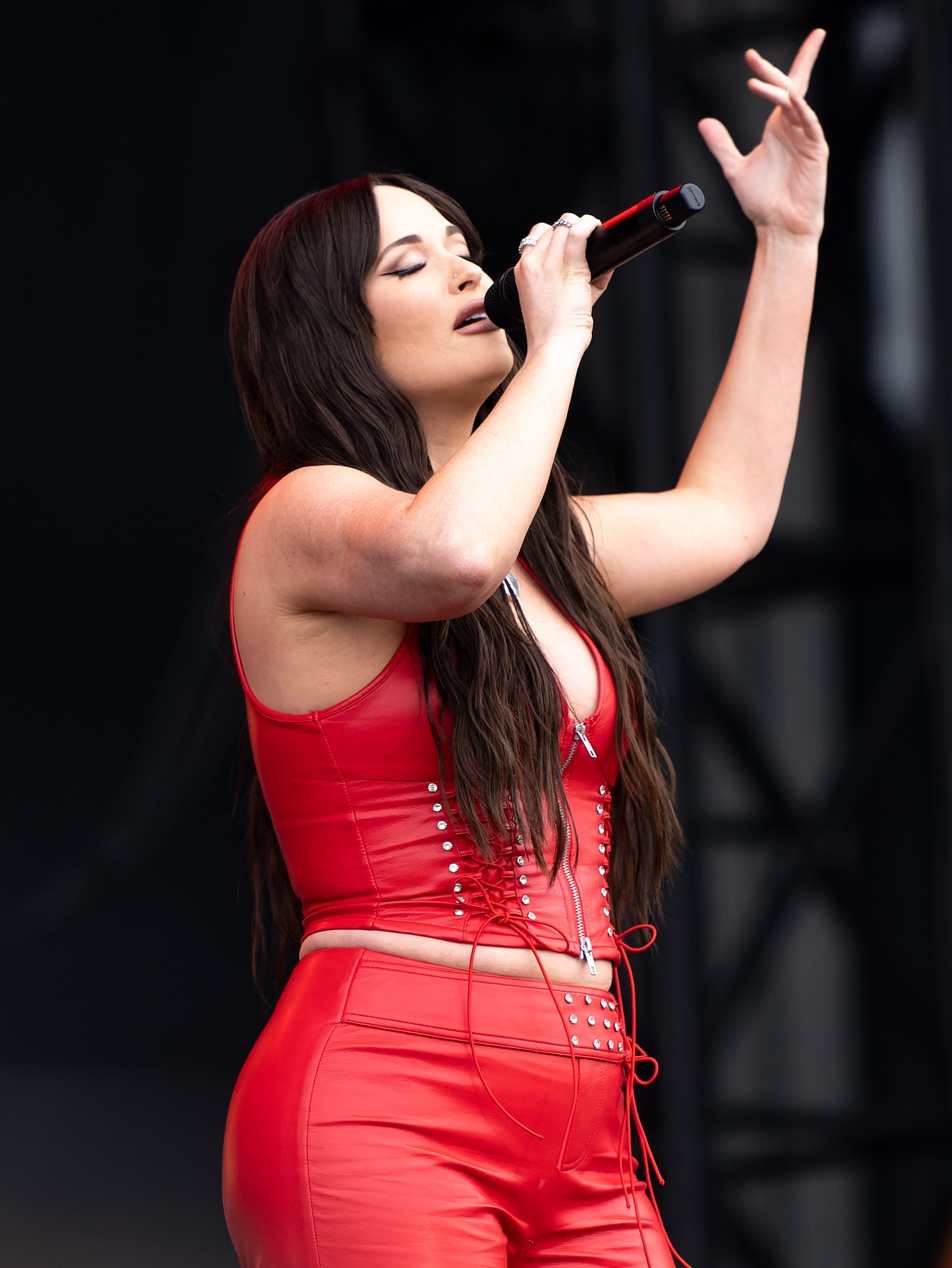
Musgraves performing at Primavera Sound in Barcelona, June 2022

On May 29, 2020, Musgraves was featured on The Flaming Lips single "Flowers of Neptune 6" and also provided vocals on two additional tracks ("Watch the Lightbugs Glow" and "God and the Policeman") on their album American Head, which was released on September 11, 2020. Musgraves also provides backing vocals on several tracks on Ruston Kelly's second album Shape & Destroy, which was recorded before she and Kelly divorced. On December 10, 2020, Troye Sivan released a reworked version of his song "Easy" which features Musgraves and was produced by Mark Ronson. Musgraves' song "Oh, What A World" was used in the Paramount Network original Christmas movie Dashing in December. She voiced Earwig's mother in the English dub of the Studio Ghibli film, Earwig and the Witch.

In April 2021, Musgraves announced that her new album would be released later that year, in partnership with UMG Nashville and Interscope Records, her first release on the latter label. Golden Hour co-producers Daniel Tashian and Ian Fitchuk will return to work on the project. Musgraves began teasing her next album by releasing snippets of new music on her 33rd birthday. On August 23, Musgraves revealed that her fifth album, now titled Star-Crossed, would be released on September 10, along with an accompanying 50-minute film which will be available for streaming exclusively on Paramount+. Musgraves also released the album's title track.

In August 2021, Musgraves announced a 15-city Star-Crossed: Unveiled Tour for the album Star-Crossed. On October 2, she became the first ever musical guest to perform nude on Saturday Night Live.

Musgraves collaborated with American country star Zach Bryan on the single "I Remember Everything" from his self-titled fourth studio album. The track debuted at the top position on the Billboard Hot 100, marking her first number 1 single on the chart. The single was nominated for two Grammy awards at the 66th Annual Grammy Awards for Best Country Song and Best Country Duo/Group Performance winning the latter. On October 6, 2023, Musgraves collaborated with breakout artist Noah Kahan on a re-released version of the single "She Calls Me Back" from Kahan's album Stick Season. In 2023, Musgraves also executive produced the country music competition show My Kind of Country with Reese Witherspoon.

In February 2024, Musgraves announced her sixth studio album, Deeper Well, which was released on March 15, 2024. She performed two songs from the album on the March 2 episode of Saturday Night Live. She was a guest and interviewed for two hours on March 18, 2024, on Howard Stern's SiriusXM show; she performed three songs live with her band at Sirius' Nashville studio. In April 2024, Musgraves collaborated with American alternative rock band Rainbow Kitten Surprise on the single "Overtime," from the band's new album Love Hate Music Box. On August 10, 2024, Musgraves and Sabrina Carpenter were in a duet singing a cover of Nancy Sinatra's "These Boots are Made for Walkin'" during Carpenter's headline set at the Outside Lands Festival in San Francisco.

=== 2026–present: Middle of Nowhere ===
In March 2026, Musgraves announced her album Middle of Nowhere and released its lead single "Dry Spell". To promote for the single, various billboards were displayed around Nashville, Los Angeles and New York City with the message 'Dry Spell? Call for a Real Good Time' and a working phone number. The album released on May 1, 2026. In October, she announced that a second volume of the album, subtitled Tex Mex Tapes, would be released on January 15, 2027.

== Artistry ==
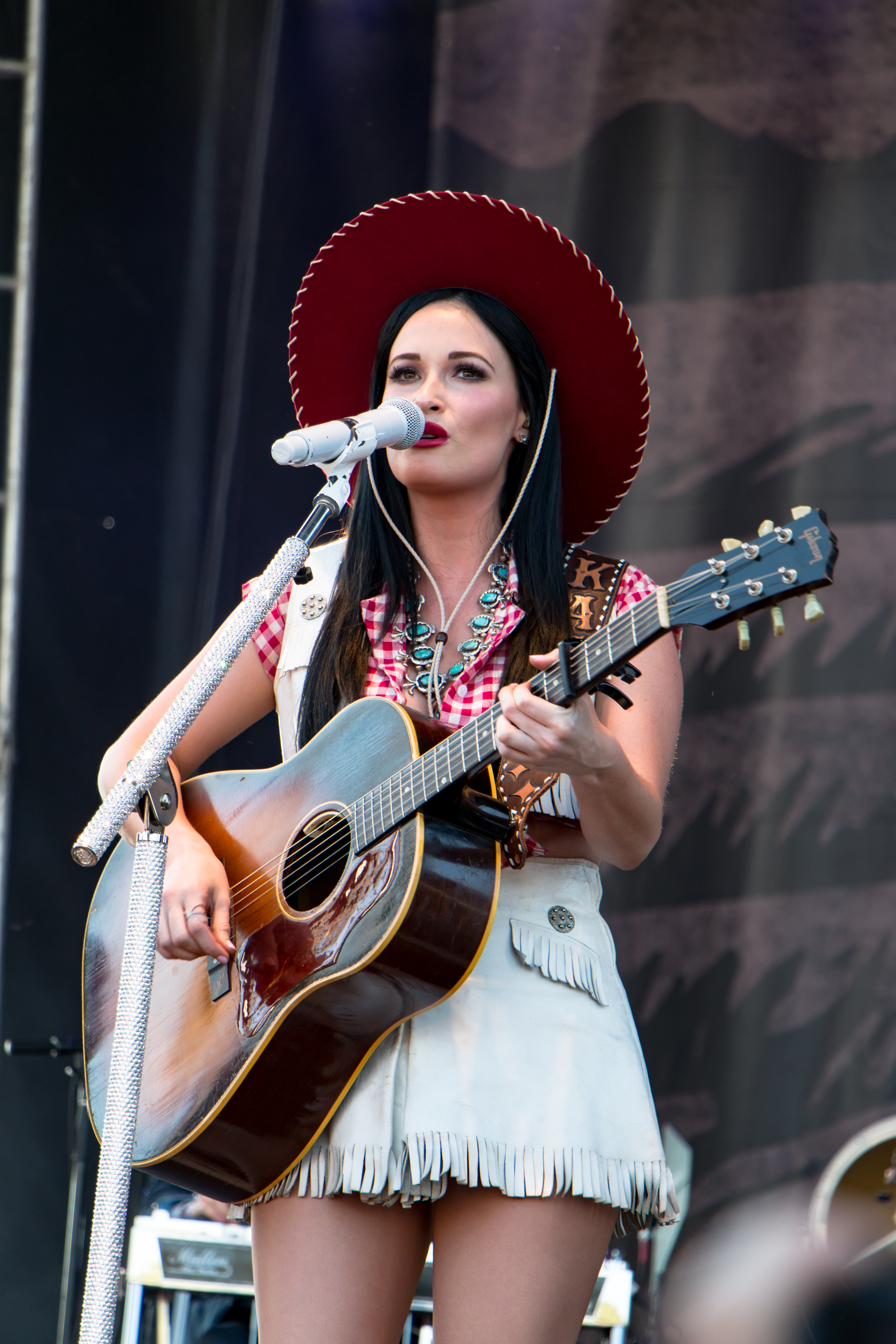
Musgraves performing at the Pilgrimage Music Festival in September 2016

=== Influences ===
Musgraves lists Alison Krauss as one of her career role models, stating, "I mean, how many Grammys does she have? She's just remained solid and true and great, and I respect that".

Musgraves' favorite artist is John Prine and, in a tribute performance to him after his death in April 2020, she said that "my favorite quality of John's would be his sense of humor and it really influenced my songwriting a lot" and proclaimed "that man singlehandedly influenced me and my songwriting more than anyone else on this planet". She lists Lee Ann Womack as one of her childhood influences: "Lee Ann Womack is from near where I grew up in East Texas, so I've always looked up to her." Musgraves spoke of both Prine and Womack, "if I could sing it like Lee Ann would and say it like John would, then I feel like I've gotten somewhere".

Musgraves listed albums by Glen Campbell, Bobbie Gentry, Marty Robbins, Charley Pride, Merle Haggard, Roger Miller, and Jim Croce as influences on her sophomore album and an interview of hers with Rolling Stone Country cited Willie Nelson, Ray Price, Julie Miller, Patsy Cline, and Loretta Lynn as being other influences. In a Billboard interview, Musgraves said that she is a Dolly Parton fan, saying "Beauty, sex appeal, brains, wit, humor, beautiful songwriting, meaningful songwriting, no apologies for who she is, LGBTQ advocate long before it was even a thing or trendy or whatever... She's fearless and I admire her spirit a lot and she's very kind. She's very present when you're talking to her and I just really love her so much."

Noncountry artists whom Musgraves has mentioned as influences include Cher, Selena, Ryan Adams, Cake, Neil Young, Weezer, Imogen Heap, Bee Gees, Sade, and Electric Light Orchestra.

=== Lyrical themes and style ===
Critics have said Musgraves is a soprano. Her socially progressive lyrics draw attention in the generally conservative country music genre.

Her music has tackled topics such as LGBT acceptance, safe sexual intercourse, recreational marijuana use, and questioning religious sentiment. In an interview with The Wall Street Journal, Musgraves talked about criticism she faced for her rebellious lyrics. "I think throwing the rebel card out there is really cheap," she said. "The things I'm singing about are not controversial to me, I don't push buttons to push buttons. I talk about things that have made an impression on me that a lot of people everywhere are going through."

In August 2026, Musgraves asked her fans at a concert in Chicago to donate to the non-profit Young Center for Immigrant Children's Rights as her "birthday gift" to support unaccompanied children whose parents have been deported, which received a large cheer from the crowd. This received backlash from conservative commentators and fans.

== Personal life ==
In 2014, in an interview with ABC Radio, Musgraves said her bandmate Misa Arriaga had been her boyfriend for several years after they first became friends and worked together.

Musgraves met Ruston Kelly in March 2016 at the Bluebird Café in Nashville. In May 2016, they had a songwriting date, and they began dating shortly after. Musgraves said that the song "Butterflies" from her album Golden Hour is about her courtship with Kelly; many other songs from the album were inspired by Kelly. On December 24, 2016, Musgraves and Kelly were engaged. They married on October 14, 2017, in Tennessee. The couple filed for divorce in July 2020 and it was finalized in September 2020. From 2021 to 2023, Musgraves was in a relationship with Cole Schafer, a poet.

== Discography ==
- Same Trailer Different Park (2013)
- Pageant Material (2015)
- A Very Kacey Christmas (2016)
- Golden Hour (2018)
- Star-Crossed (2021)
- Deeper Well (2024)
- Middle of Nowhere (2026)
- Tex Mex Tapes (2027)

== Tours ==
=== Headlining ===
- Same Trailer Different Tour (2013–2015)
- The Kacey Musgraves Country & Western Rhinestone Revue (2015–2016)
- A Very Kacey Christmas Tour (2016)
- Oh, What a World: Tour (2018–2019)
- Oh, What a World: Tour II (2019)
- Star-Crossed: Unveiled (2022)
- Deeper Well World Tour (2024)
- Middle of Nowhere Tour (2026–2027)

=== Opening act ===
- 50th Anniversary Tour for Loretta Lynn (2012)
- 2012 Spring Tour for John Mayer; canceled (2012)
- Own the Night Tour for Lady Antebellum (2012)
- Tornado Tour for Little Big Town (2013)
- No Shoes Nation Tour for Kenny Chesney (2013)
- Take Me Downtown Tour for Lady Antebellum (2013–2014)
- Together in Concert for Willie Nelson and Family and Alison Krauss and Union Station (2014)
- Prismatic World Tour for Katy Perry (2014)
- Strait to Vegas for George Strait (2016)
- The Breakers Tour for Little Big Town (2018)
- Harry Styles: Live on Tour for Harry Styles (2018)

== Awards and honors ==
At the Grammy Awards, Musgraves has received eight awards from twenty-one nominations.

- Album of the Year - Golden Hour (2019)
- Best Country Song - "Merry Go 'Round" (2014), "Space Cowboy" (2019), "The Architect" (2025)
- Best Country Album - Same Trailer Different Park (2014), Golden Hour (2019)
- Best Country Solo Performance - "Butterflies" (2019)
- Best Country Duo/Group Performance - "I Remember Everything" with Zach Bryan (2024)
