= Same Trailer Different Park =

Studio album by Kacey Musgraves
- Released: March 19, 2013
- Recorded: 2012–2013
- Studios: Ben's Studio; The Racket; Sound Emporium; Maverick Recording (Nashville, Tennessee)
- Genre: Country
- Length: 40:01
- Label: Mercury Nashville
- Producers: Luke Laird; Shane McAnally; Kacey Musgraves

Kacey Musgraves chronology
Kacey Musgraves (2007)	Same Trailer Different Park (2013)	Pageant Material (2015)

Singles from Same Trailer Different Park
- 1. "Merry Go 'Round" Released: September 10, 2012; 2. "Blowin' Smoke" Released: April 1, 2013; 3. "Follow Your Arrow" Released: October 21, 2013; 4. "Keep It to Yourself" Released: March 10, 2014

Same Trailer Different Park is the debut studio album by the American singer-songwriter Kacey Musgraves, released on March 19, 2013, through Mercury Nashville. Inspired by Musgraves' upbringing in rural Texas, the album explores small-town life through character-driven storytelling and personal reflection.

Musgraves wrote the material with country music songwriters Brandy Clark, Luke Laird, Shane McAnally, and Josh Osborne, and co-produced the album with Laird and McAnally. Musically, it blends midtempo country with elements of pop, rockabilly, blues rock, and country folk. The lyrics center on working-class characters navigating everyday struggles, setbacks, and moments of personal realization.

The album was supported by four singles—"Merry Go 'Round", "Blowin' Smoke", "Follow Your Arrow", and "Keep It to Yourself"—all of which reached the top 40 on the Billboard Hot Country Songs chart. In the United States, Same Trailer Different Park peaked at number one on the Top Country Albums chart and number two on the Billboard 200. It remained on the chart for 72 weeks and was certified platinum, and also charted in Australia, Canada, and the United Kingdom.

Critics praised the album's songwriting, highlighting Musgraves's ability to balance humor and melancholy while addressing taboo or unconventional topics in a conversational style. Same Trailer Different Park won the Grammy Award for Best Country Album, while "Merry Go 'Round" received the Grammy Award for Best Country Song and "Follow Your Arrow" won Song of the Year at the Country Music Association Awards.

== Background and development ==
After graduating from high school, Musgraves moved to Austin, Texas and self-released three traditional Western swing albums. She competed on the reality television series Nashville Star, then permanently relocated to Nashville, Tennessee. Musgraves co-wrote songs for Martina McBride and Miranda Lambert, including Lambert's single "Mama's Broken Heart". She also sang demo recordings for songs shopped to other artists, including one for The Band Perry's "Better Dig Two", and one of her songs ("Undermine") was picked up for season one of the musical drama series Nashville.

In 2012, she signed with Mercury Nashville. Musgraves co-produced her major label debut album with Luke Laird and Shane McAnally. She said, "The making of this record was such a fun and meaningful time for me. As a writer, singer and producer I learned so much throughout the whole process. I am proud and excited to present a project ... that came from a very real and inspired place in my brain and heart."

== Composition ==
=== Music and lyrics ===
Same Trailer Different Park is a country album that draws on styles such as pop, blues rock, rockabilly, and country folk. Its songs are performed midtempo. Musgraves's perspective across Same Trailer Different Park has been described as working class and rural, with "middle-American melancholy". The songs feature stories of challenges and setbacks faced by people who struggle with their surroundings. Jonathan Bernstein of American Songwriter wrote that Musgraves's characters are "well-wishers and help-seekers, deadbeats trying to be better and do-gooders that are falling behind", and that she focuses on "small, pivotal moments, when they come to terms with their own faults and dreams, when they’re on the verge of a breakthrough or a meltdown." Her approach to songwriting was inspired by John Prine's straightforward lyrics. She also cited Ryan Adams, Glen Campbell, Patty Griffin, Loretta Lynn, Dolly Parton, and Willie Nelson, Buck Owens, and Lee Ann Womack as influences.

=== Songs ===
Opening track "Silver Lining" employs a "jangly Americana groove". "Merry Go 'Round" is a "metaphor for small-town self-entrapment." Musgraves sings over a shuffle beat and banjo about emotional, material, and addictive liabilities that prevent people from escaping restrictive lifestyles. "Dandelion" explores Musgraves' vulnerability. "Blowin' Smoke" assumes the lens of a waitress who is "a little broken down, a little down on her luck." Musgraves and her collaborators went to a Waffle House, where Laird recorded background noise with his iPhone to evoke a greasy spoon diner.

"Back on the Map" was compared to the "esoteric" work of singer-songwriters Kathleen Edwards and Aimee Mann. On "Keep It to Yourself", a country pop song, the narrator does not want to hear how her ex is feeling to avoid falling for him again. "Follow Your Arrow" examines the small-minded perspective of small-town life by encouraging "self-determination in the face of social disapproval". Its lyrics received attention for Musgraves' "casual inclusivity" of the queer community and marijuana references. Album closer "It Is What It Is" examines "letting a relationship peter out more slowly than it should just because the companionship and sex are still okay."

== Promotion and release ==
In January 2013, Same Trailer Different Park was announced with a March 19 release date. Prior to the release of Same Trailer Different Park, Musgraves opened concerts for Lady A and Little Big Town. Following the album's release, she opened up for Kenny Chesney's No Shoes Nation summer tour. She appeared on television shows including Austin City Limits and The Ellen DeGeneres Show.

=== Singles ===
She persuaded Mike Dungan, chairman and chief executive of Universal Music Group Nashville, to release "Merry Go 'Round" as the album's first single. It was released on September 10, 2012. The song spent 30 weeks on the Billboard Hot Country Songs chart, peaking at No. 14 on the chart dated February 16, 2013. It also reached the top 10 of the Country Airplay chart and spent two weeks on top of the Bubbling Under Hot 100 chart. Rolling Stone named "Merry Go 'Round" one of the top 50 singles of 2012, and the song placed in the top 30 in The Village Voice's Pazz & Jop critics poll.

"Blowin' Smoke" was released on April 1 as the album's second single. It reached the top 40 on the Hot Country Songs and Country Airplay charts. "Follow Your Arrow followed as the album's third single on October 21, 2013. It marked Musgraves' first top 10 on the Hot Country Songs chart. Blogger Perez Hilton ran a contest where he challenged people to cover "Follow Your Arrow". "Keep It to Yourself" was sent to radio as the album's fourth single in March 2014.

== Commercial performance ==
Same Trailer Different Park debuted at number two on the US Billboard 200 chart, selling 42,000 copies in its first week. It also debuted at number one on the Top Country Albums chart. The week after the album won two awards and was performed at the 2014 Grammy Awards, sales in the United States increased 146 percent. The week of February 6, 2014, the album returned to number one on the US Top Country Albums chart and saw sales increase a further 177 percent. As of July 2015 the album has sold 519,000 copies in the US. On April 4, 2018, the album was certified platinum by the Recording Industry Association of America (RIAA) for combined sales and album-equivalent units of over a million units in the United States.

== Critical reception ==
Professional ratings
Aggregate scores
Source	Rating
Metacritic	89/100
Review scores
Source	Rating
AllMusic	4/5 stars
American Songwriter	4.5/5 stars
Entertainment Weekly	A−
The Guardian	4/5 stars
MSN Music (Expert Witness)	A−
Nash Country Weekly	A
Paste	8.3/10
Q	4/5 stars
Rolling Stone	4/5 stars
USA Today	3.5/4 stars

At Metacritic, which assigns a rating out of 100 to reviews from mainstream critics, the album has an average score of 89 out of 100, which indicates "universal acclaim" based on 12 reviews. Tammy Ragusa of Country Weekly called it "distinctive in both its arrangements and lyrics." AllMusic's Steve Leggett commended Musgraves' "flair for telling it like it is and making it sound like bedrock, obvious wisdom", and said that the album is "more than a collection of songs just aiming for the country charts."

MSN Music's Robert Christgau called her "the finest lyricist to rise up out of conscious country since Miranda Lambert, if not Bobby Pinson himself." Jon Caramanica of The New York Times observed "a boatload of identifying details" in Musgraves' lyrics and called it an "acidic and beautiful" album that is indebted "at least a little bit to Ms. Lambert's durable template." Will Hermes, writing for NPR, said that her "wordplay feels effortless and conversational", and found Musgraves' "spirits of carpe diem and dysfunctional romance" to be "squarely" in the tradition of country music.

Grady Smith of Entertainment Weekly said that the album "continually showcases ... her writing prowess" because "Musgraves has a way of injecting humor into even her most melancholic musings." At Paste, Holly Gleason noted Musgraves "sings unvarnished truths" while maintaining "the sunniness that is the right of the young" that is done "With a voice that’s pretty, but brazen, Musgraves has no problem slinging attitude, crying bullshit or coyly advocating same-sex amour/dope-smoking while skewering hypocrisy." In addition, Gleason saw this album as "a manifesto that'll never come true," which she asked the question "is dignity enough to get by on?", and her response was that by a "thin margin, but one Musgraves walks straight into the sunset."

Jody Rosen of Rolling Stone felt that, although Musgraves lacks a powerful singing voice, the album "showcases a songwriting voice you won't hear anywhere else in pop: young, female, downwardly mobile, fiercely witty." David Burger of The Salt Lake Tribune vowed that the album "is not only intriguing vocally but engaging lyrically". Taste of Country's Billy Dukes commented that the album "is well-written, edgy (yet familiar) and coated in 'cool.'" Jerry Shriver of USA Today said the songs are "honest with themselves and don't wallow in self-pity", and that Musgraves' singing is "pretty and clear but usually unsentimental."

=== Year-end lists ===
Select year-end rankings of Same Trailer Different Park
Publication	List	Rank	Ref.
American Songwriter	7	Top 50 Albums of 2013	
Billboard	10	15 Best Albums of 2013: Critics' Picks	
Entertainment Weekly	4	10 Best Albums of 2013	
Evening Standard	9	The 10 Best Albums of 2013	
The Guardian	16	Best Albums of 2013	
Paste	20	The 50 Best Albums of 2013	
Pazz & Jop	10	Pazz & Jop 2013 Best Albums	
Rolling Stone	28	50 Best Albums of 2013	
Spin	17	Spin's 50 Best Albums of 2013	
The Washington Post	1	Top Ten Albums of 2013	

== Accolades ==
Same Trailer Different Park won the Grammy Award for Best Country Album award at the 56th Annual Grammy Awards in January 2014. On April 6, 2014, it won Album of the Year at the 49th Annual Academy of Country Music Awards.

Awards and nominations for Same Trailer Different Park
Year	Organization	Award	Result
2013	CMA Awards	Album of the Year	Nominated
2014	Grammy Awards	Best Country Album	Won
2014	ACM Awards	Album of the Year (two nominations: artist and producer)	Won
2014	World Music Awards	World's Best Album	Nominated

== Track listing ==
All tracks are produced by Luke Laird, Shane McAnally, and Kacey Musgraves.

No.	Title	Writer(s)	Length
1.	"Silver Lining"	Kacey Musgraves; Shane McAnally; Josh Osborne	3:50
2.	"My House"	Musgraves; McAnally; Osborne	2:40
3.	"Merry Go 'Round"	Musgraves; McAnally; Osborne	3:26
4.	"Dandelion"	Musgraves; McAnally; Brandy Clark	3:02
5.	"Blowin' Smoke"	Musgraves; McAnally; Laird	3:08
6.	"I Miss You"	Musgraves; Laird; Osborne	3:49
7.	"Step Off"	Musgraves; McAnally; Laird	3:02
8.	"Back on the Map"	Musgraves; Laird	4:06
9.	"Keep It to Yourself"	Musgraves; McAnally; Laird	3:16
10.	"Stupid"	Musgraves; McAnally; Osborne	2:37
11.	"Follow Your Arrow"	Musgraves; McAnally; Clark	3:19
12.	"It Is What It Is"	Musgraves; Clark; Laird	3:46
Total length:			40:01

== Personnel ==
Credits were adapted from AllMusic and liner notes.

Musicians

- Kacey Musgraves – lead vocals, acoustic guitar, harmonica, whistling, gang vocals
- Matt Stanfield – keyboards, Wurlitzer electric piano
- John Henry Trinko –accordion
- J. T. Corenflos – electric guitar
- Luke Laird – electric guitar, acoustic guitar, backing vocals, gang vocals
- Dave Levita – electric guitar
- Rob McNelly – electric guitar
- Kyle Ryan – electric guitar, backing vocals, gang vocals
- Ilya Toshinsky – electric guitar, acoustic guitar, banjo, resonator guitar
- Oscar Aranda – acoustic guitar
- Misa Arriaga – acoustic guitar, ukulele, backing vocals, gang vocals
- Josh Osborne – acoustic guitar, backing vocals
- Bucky Baxter – pedal steel guitar
- Russ Pahl — pedal steel guitar
- Jimmie Lee Sloas – bass guitar
- Fred Eltringham – drums, tambourine, foot stomping
- Claire Indie – cello
- Hannah Schroeder – cello
- Kree Harrison – backing vocals
- Natalie Hemby – backing vocals
- Shane McAnally – backing vocals, gang vocals
- Waffle House background noise on "Blowin' Smoke" recorded by Luke Laird.

Production and technical

- Luke Laird – producer
- Shane McAnally – producer
- Kacey Musgraves – producer, art direction
- Charlie Brocco – recording
- Ryan Gore – additional recording, mixing
- Leslie Richter – recording assistant
- Mike Stankiewicz – additional recording assistant
- Andrew Mendelson – mastering at Georgetown Masters (Nashville, Tennessee)
- LeAnn "Goddess" Bennett – production coordination
- Mike "Frog" Griffith – production coordination
- Ilya Toshinsky – track coordination
- Kelly Christine Musgraves – art direction, photography
- Karen Naff – art direction, design, illustrations
- Steve Richards – illustrations
- Jason Owen – management

== Charts ==
=== Weekly charts ===
Chart (2013)	Peak position
Australian Albums (ARIA)	77
Canadian Albums (Billboard)	13
UK Albums (Official Charts)	39
UK Country Albums (Official Charts)	2
US Billboard 200	2
US Top Country Albums (Billboard)	1
Chart (2019)	Peak position
US Americana/Folk Albums (Billboard)	18

=== Year-end charts ===
Chart (2013)	Position
US Billboard 200	114
US Top Country Albums (Billboard)	26
Chart (2014)	Position
US Billboard 200	85
US Top Country Albums (Billboard)	14

== Certifications ==
Region	Certification	Certified units/sales
United Kingdom (BPI)	Silver	60,000^{‡}
United States (RIAA)	Platinum	1,000,000^{‡}
^{‡} Sales+streaming figures based on certification alone.
