= Merry Go 'Round (Kacey Musgraves song) =

Single by Kacey Musgraves

from the album Same Trailer Different Park
- Released: September 10, 2012
- Genre: Country
- Length: 3:28
- Label: Mercury Nashville
- Songwriters: Kacey Musgraves; Josh Osborne; Shane McAnally
- Producers: Luke Laird; Shane McAnally; Kacey Musgraves

Kacey Musgraves singles chronology
"Oh, Tonight" (2011)	"Merry Go 'Round" (2012)	"Blowin' Smoke" (2013)

"Merry Go 'Round" is the debut single by American country music artist Kacey Musgraves. It was released in September 2012 as the lead single from her debut album Same Trailer Different Park. Musgraves co-wrote and co-produced the song with Shane McAnally, with additional writing from Josh Osborne and production assistance from Luke Laird.

"Merry Go 'Round" won the Grammy Award for Best Country Song at the 56th Grammy Awards.

== Content ==
The song is a cynical observation on life in the American heartland. It uses samples of the nursery rhyme Mary, Mary, Quite Contrary as a continued play-on-words. The latter part of the song retells another traditional nursery rhyme, Jack and Jill, in a modernized fashion. It is in the key of F-sharp major, in a 2/2 time signature with an approximate tempo of 88 beats per minute. The song's main accompaniment is guitar and banjo.

The song's plays on words in the chorus are only made possible by the General American merger of Mary, marry and merry.

== Critical reception ==
Giving it 4.5 stars out of 5, Billy Dukes of Taste of Country compared the song's style and Musgraves' voice favorably to Miranda Lambert. It received a "thumbs up" from Juli Thanki of Engine 145, who said that Musgraves "writes with a maturity beyond her 24 years, delivering an unflinching look into small-town life that’s more nuanced than the highly romanticized rural anthems offered up by many of her male counterparts."

It also made "NPR Music's 100 Favorite Songs of 2012" list. It was number 1 on Billboard's "10 Best Country Singles of 2013" list.

Rolling Stone named it the 49th best single of 2012. It was also ranked number 362 in the 2021 revision of Rolling Stone's 500 Greatest Songs of All Time.

== Music video ==
Directed by Perry Bean, the music video premiered in September 2012.

== Commercial performance ==
"Merry Go 'Round" peaked at No. 14 on the Hot Country Songs chart. The song reached the top 10 of the Billboard Country Airplay chart. The song has sold 825,000 copies in the US as of February 2014.

== Charts ==
=== Weekly charts ===
Chart (2012–2013)	Peak position
Canada Hot 100 (Billboard)	84
Canada Country (Billboard)	26
US Billboard Hot 100	63
US Hot Country Songs (Billboard)	14
US Country Airplay (Billboard)	10

=== Year-end charts ===
Chart (2013)	Position
US Country Airplay (Billboard)	63
US Hot Country Songs (Billboard)	52

== Certifications ==
Region	Certification	Certified units/sales
United States (RIAA)	2× Platinum	2,000,000^{‡}
^{‡} Sales+streaming figures based on certification alone.
