= Follow Your Arrow =

2013 single by Kacey Musgraves

- UK physical single cover

Single by Kacey Musgraves

from the album Same Trailer Different Park
- Released: October 21, 2013
- Genre: Country
- Length: 3:21
- Label: Mercury Nashville
- Songwriters: Kacey Musgraves; Shane McAnally; Brandy Clark
- Producers: Kacey Musgraves; Shane McAnally; Luke Laird

Kacey Musgraves singles chronology
"Blowin' Smoke" (2013)	"Follow Your Arrow" (2013)	"Keep It to Yourself" (2014)

"Follow Your Arrow" is a song by American country music singer and songwriter Kacey Musgraves from her major label debut studio album, Same Trailer Different Park (2013). Mercury Nashville released it on October 21, 2013, as the album's third single. Musgraves wrote the song with Brandy Clark and Shane McAnally. "Follow Your Arrow" won Song of the Year at the 2014 CMA Awards. Rolling Stone ranked the track at number 36 on its 2024 list of the "200 Greatest Country Songs of All Time".

== Music and lyrics ==
The song is in the key of F major with a main chord pattern of F – Dm – B♭– Gm – C and a vocal range between F_{3} and C_{5}. It is in a 4/4 time signature with a moderate tempo.

Suggesting that any given choice will elicit criticism from others, the narrator states that one's best course is to remain true to oneself ("follow your arrow"). One line within the chorus ("Kiss lots of boys / or kiss lots of girls, if that's something you're into") includes support of the LGBTQ community.

== Critical reception ==
"Follow Your Arrow" has been acclaimed by most critics since its release, despite receiving initial criticism from some conservative groups. Billboard listed "Follow Your Arrow" at number two on its list of the "20 Best Songs of 2013", saying that "you didn't have to be a hardcore country fan to boogie along to Kacey Musgraves' exuberant call to make lots of noise and kiss lots of boys—or lots of girls, if that's something you're into." Rolling Stone ranked the song at number 39 on its 2014 list of the "100 Greatest Country Songs of All Time". The magazine also ranked it eight on its 2019 list of the "100 Best Songs of the 2010s". In a 2024 update, Rolling Stone listed it at number 36 on its "200 Greatest Country Songs of All Time" list. "Follow Your Arrow" won Song of the Year at the 2014 Country Music Association Awards.

At the 2013 Country Music Association Awards, they censored the famous line "Roll up a joint" because they deemed it too controversial for primetime television. "Follow Your Arrow" received mixed reviews from some conservatives due to some of the song's lyrics, as they claimed the country tune was "an attack on Christians", while others called it a "sign of [a] shift in country music".

== Chart performance ==
"Follow Your Arrow" debuted at number 56 on the US Billboard Country Airplay chart for the week of November 2, 2013. It also debuted at number 28 on the US Billboard Hot Country Songs chart for the week of November 23, 2013, and at number 60 on the US Billboard Hot 100 chart for the week of February 15, 2014. In the week of February 15, 2014, the song also jumped from number 26 to number 10 on the Billboard Hot Country Songs chart, giving Musgraves her first top ten single as a recording artist on that chart. As of June 2014, the song has sold 471,000 digital copies in the US.

== Music video ==
The music video was directed by Honey and Kacey Musgraves and premiered in December 2013.

== Live performances ==
Musgraves performed the song on November 6 at the 2013 Country Music Association Awards. On January 26, Musgraves performed the song at the 56th annual Grammy Awards held at the Staples Center in Los Angeles.

== Charts ==
=== Weekly charts ===
Chart (2013)	Peak position
Canada Hot 100 (Billboard)	50
Canada Country (Billboard)	42
US Billboard Hot 100	60
US Country Airplay (Billboard)	43
US Hot Country Songs (Billboard)	10

=== Year-end charts ===
Chart (2014)	Position
US Hot Country Songs (Billboard)	90

== Certifications ==
Region	Certification	Certified units/sales
United States (RIAA)	Platinum	1,000,000^{‡}
^{‡} Sales+streaming figures based on certification alone.
