= Middle of Nowhere Tour =

2026-2027 concert tour by Kacey Musgraves

- Tour by Kacey Musgraves
- Promotion poster
- Location: Europe; North America; Oceania
- Associated album: Middle of Nowhere
- Start date: August 21, 2026
- End date: February 26, 2027
- No. of shows: 37
- Supporting acts: Midland; Flatland Cavalry; Carter Faith; Charles Wesley Godwin; Estevie; William Beckmann; Gabriella Rose; The Brudi Brothers

Kacey Musgraves concert chronology
- Deeper Well World Tour (2024); Middle of Nowhere Tour (2026–2027)

The Middle of Nowhere Tour is the ongoing eighth headlining concert tour by American country music singer-songwriter Kacey Musgraves in support of her seventh (Note: Some media outlets and Musgraves herself regard Middle of Nowhere as her sixth studio album, while other outlets describe it as her seventh. However, Middle of Nowhere is technically her seventh release, including her Christmas album A Very Kacey Christmas.) studio album, Middle of Nowhere (2026). It began on August 21, 2026, in Chicago at United Center and is set to conclude on February 26, 2027, in London at the OVO Arena Wembley, consisting of 37 dates across North America, Australia, and the United Kingdom. Midland, Flatland Cavalry, Carter Faith, Charles Wesley Godwin, Estevie, William Beckmann, Gabriella Rose, and the Brudi Brothers serve as opening acts.

== Background ==
On March 11, 2026, Kacey Musgraves announced her seventh studio album Middle of Nowhere, released on May 1, 2026. The album was preceded by two singles, "Dry Spell" and "Middle of Nowhere". This was her first release under Lost Highway Records since its relaunch in 2025.

On April 29, 2026, Musgraves announced the Middle of Nowhere Tour, spanning 25 North American cities over 29 dates. On May 8, 2026, she announced a second show in Chicago, Boston, Dallas, and Austin and a third show in New York City at the Barclays Center in Brooklyn.

On May 12, 2026, Musgraves announced three UK shows scheduled for February 2027. This marks her first time solo headlining multiple arenas in the region. Tickets go on sale on May 15, with an artist pre-sale happening on May 13, 2026.

On July 20, 2026, Musgraves was announced to headline Longhaul Festival, a new country festival in Australia in Brisbane, Melbourne and Sydney.

On July 26, 2026, Musgrave canceled three of the tour's concerts without explanation.

== Set list ==
This set list is from the August 21, 2026, concert in Chicago. It is not representative of all concerts for the duration of the tour.

1. "Everybody Wants to Be a Cowboy"
2. "Dry Spell"
3. "Justified"
4. "High Horse"
5. "Merry Go 'Round"
6. "Butterflies"
7. "Abilene"
8. "Back on the Wagon"
9. "I Believe in Ghosts"
10. "Uncertain, TX"
11. "Horses and Divorces"
12. "Hey Baby (Que Pasó)" (Texas Tornados cover)
13. "Golden Hour"
14. "Loneliest Girl"
15. "Rhinestoned"
16. "Mexico Honey"
17. "Middle of Nowhere"
18. "Slow Burn"
19. "Space Cowboy"
20. "Follow Your Arrow"
21. "All My Ex's Live in Texas" (George Strait cover)

=== Alterations ===
- For the show in Boston and the first show in New York City, Musgraves added "Rainbow" to the set list. She also performed a cover of "Here You Come Again" by Dolly Parton.
- During the first show in New York City, Musgraves performed a cover of "9 to 5" by Dolly Parton.
- During the second show in New York City, Troye Sivan joined Musgraves onstage to perform their remix of "Easy".
- During the second show in Nashville, Ronnie Dunn joined Musgraves onstage to perform "Neon Moon".
- For the show in Atlanta, Musgraves added "Hell On Me" and "Hookup Scene" to the set list.
- For the show in Charlotte, Musgraves added "Late to the Party" and "Deeper Well" to the set list.
- During the show in Houston, Musgraves performed a cover of "I Could Fall in Love" by Selena.

== Tour dates ==
List of 2026 concerts
| Date (2026) | City | Country | Venue | Opening act(s) | Attendance | Revenue |
|---|---|---|---|---|---|---|
| August 21 | Chicago | United States | United Center | Midland | | |
| August 24 | Toronto | Canada | Scotiabank Arena | Midland | | |
| August 28 | Boston | United States | TD Garden | Midland | | |
| August 31 | New York City | United States | Madison Square Garden | Flatland Cavalry | | |
| September 1 | New York City | United States | Madison Square Garden | Flatland Cavalry | | |
| September 4 | Philadelphia | United States | Xfinity Mobile Arena | Flatland Cavalry | | |
| September 5 | Baltimore | United States | CFG Bank Arena | Flatland Cavalry | | |
| September 8 | Pittsburgh | United States | PPG Paints Arena | Flatland Cavalry | | |
| September 9 | Columbus | United States | Schottenstein Center | Midland | | |
| September 11 | Milwaukee | United States | Fiserv Forum | Midland | | |
| September 12 | St. Louis | United States | Enterprise Center | Midland | | |
| September 22 | Minneapolis | United States | Target Center | Carter Faith | | |
| September 23 | Kansas City | United States | T-Mobile Center | Charles Wesley Godwin | | |
| September 25 (Note: Part of the Bourbon & Beyond festival.) | Louisville | United States | Kentucky Exposition Center | —N/a | | |
| September 27 | Nashville | United States | Bridgestone Arena | Flatland Cavalry | | |
| September 28 | Nashville | United States | Bridgestone Arena | Flatland Cavalry | | |
| September 30 | Atlanta | United States | State Farm Arena | Flatland Cavalry | | |
| October 2 | Charlotte | United States | Spectrum Center | Estevie | | |
| October 5 | Houston | United States | Toyota Center | William Beckmann | | |
| October 7 | Austin | United States | Moody Center | William Beckmann | | |
| October 8 | Austin | United States | Moody Center | William Beckmann | | |
| October 10 | Dallas | United States | American Airlines Center | William Beckmann | | |
| October 11 | Dallas | United States | American Airlines Center | William Beckmann | | |
| October 13 | Denver | United States | Ball Arena | Carter Faith | | |
| October 15 | Salt Lake City | United States | Delta Center | Gabriella Rose | | |
| October 17 | Phoenix | United States | Mortgage Matchup Center | Gabriella Rose | | |
| October 18 | Los Angeles | United States | Crypto.com Arena | Gabriella Rose | | |
| October 19 | Los Angeles | United States | Crypto.com Arena | Estevie | | |
| October 23 | Oakland | United States | Oakland Arena | Estevie | | |
| October 26 | Seattle | United States | Climate Pledge Arena | The Brudi Brothers | | |
| October 27 | Seattle | United States | Climate Pledge Arena | The Brudi Brothers | | |

List of 2027 concerts
| Date (2027) | City | Country | Venue | Opening act(s) | Attendance | Revenue |
|---|---|---|---|---|---|---|
| January 22 (Note: Part of Longhaul Festival) | Melbourne | Australia | Melbourne Showgrounds | TBA | —N/a | —N/a |
| January 23 | Sydney | Australia | Sydney Showgrounds | TBA | —N/a | —N/a |
| January 24 | Brisbane | Australia | Brisbane Showgrounds | TBA | —N/a | —N/a |
| February 22 | Glasgow | Scotland | OVO Hydro | TBA | —N/a | —N/a |
| February 24 | Manchester | England | AO Arena | TBA | —N/a | —N/a |
| February 26 | London | England | OVO Arena Wembley | TBA | —N/a | —N/a |
| Total | | | | | —N/a | —N/a |

=== Canceled tour dates ===
List of canceled concerts
| Date (2026) | City | Country | Venue |
|---|---|---|---|
| August 20 | Chicago | United States | United Center |
| August 29 | Boston | United States | TD Garden |
| September 2 | New York City | United States | Barclays Center |
