= Middle of Nowhere (Kacey Musgraves album) =

- Standard cover

Studio album by Kacey Musgraves
- Released: May 1, 2026
- Studios: Sound Emporium; RCA Studio A; Royal Plum; The Cabin; Blackbird; The Study; East Iris; The Saltmine Studio Oasis
- Genre: Country
- Length: 44:10
- Label: Lost Highway
- Producers: Kacey Musgraves; Daniel Tashian; Ian Fitchuk

Kacey Musgraves chronology
Deeper Well (2024)	Middle of Nowhere (2026)	Middle of Nowhere Vol. 2: Tex Mex Tapes (2027)

Singles from Middle of Nowhere
- 1. "Dry Spell" Released: March 11, 2026; 2. "Middle of Nowhere" Released: April 17, 2026; 3. "Loneliest Girl" Released: May 4, 2026; 4. "Mexico Honey" Released: July 10, 2026

Middle of Nowhere is the seventh (Note: Some media outlets and Musgraves herself regard Middle of Nowhere as her sixth studio album, while other outlets describe it as her seventh. However, Middle of Nowhere is technically her seventh release, including her Christmas album A Very Kacey Christmas.) studio album by American singer-songwriter Kacey Musgraves. It was released on May 1, 2026, through Lost Highway Records. The album was written and recorded following her signing to the relaunched label, which she had been the final artist to join prior to its initial closure in 2012.

Middle of Nowhere was developed during a period of prolonged singlehood, which Musgraves described as shaping its themes of solitude, self-definition, and "liminal" states. Drawing on her Texas roots, it incorporates elements of country, Western swing, bluegrass, and regional Mexican styles, while emphasizing traditional instrumentation such as the pedal steel guitar. Its lyrics reflect introspection and post-breakup clarity, with an increased focus on personal independence and emotional transition.

Musgraves released four singles from Middle of Nowhere—"Dry Spell", the title track, "Loneliest Girl", and "Mexico Honey". In support of the album, she embarked on its accompanying tour, Middle of Nowhere Tour. Middle of Nowhere received critical acclaim from reviewers, who highlighted its thematic focus on solitude and its blend of traditional and contemporary country elements. The album has charted within the top ten in Scotland, the United Kingdom, and the United States as well as the top twenty in Australia, Austria, Belgium, Canada, Germany, New Zealand, and Switzerland. A companion album, Middle of Nowhere Vol. 2: Tex Mex Tapes, is set for release in January 2027.

== Background and writing ==
Kacey Musgraves released her sixth studio album, Deeper Well, in March 2024, and its deluxe edition that August. In April 2025, she signed with the relaunched Lost Highway Records as the label's first signee following Interscope Records's announcement of its revival. Musgraves originally signed to Lost Highway in 2011 as its final artist signing, before the label was folded into Mercury Nashville a year later. She released some singles that year, including "Lost Highway" and "If the World Burns Down".

According to the press release, Middle of Nowhere was "written during a period of reflection and post-breakup clarity". Musgraves worked on the album while single and "leaning into" herself, co-writing every song on the album. She enlisted her longtime collaborators to write and produce the album, reuniting with Luke Laird, Shane McAnally, Josh Osborne, and Brandy Clark, who contributed to her first major label albums. American songwriters Daniel Tashian and Ian Fitchuk, with whom she began working on her fourth studio album, Golden Hour (2018), also reconciled with her. American singers Willie Nelson, Miranda Lambert, and Billy Strings, and South African musician Gregory Alan Isakov participated as featured guests on the album; it marked Musgraves's third collaboration with Nelson, following "Are You Sure" and "A Willie Nice Christmas". Her collaboration with Lambert arose after she reached out to write about their shared experiences, during which they addressed lingering tensions related to "Mama's Broken Heart" (2013), a song she had co-written that was ultimately recorded by Lambert.

Middle of Nowhere was partly inspired by Musgraves's experiences of solitude and self-definition. She said it felt "incredible being alone" and described herself as "existing in a space not defined by anyone else". Expressing an interest in the concept of "liminal space, both geographical and emotional", she explained that she became comfortable inhabiting transitional, undefined states and the "middle of nowhere" in many senses, and that she spent time between Texas, Tennessee, and Mexico. (Note: Attributed to multiple sources) Musgraves also noted to Apple Music that the album differed from her usual approach to music-making, stating that she began writing while going through a breakup, during which she was reevaluating aspects of her personal life and spending more time alone.

== Artwork and title ==
"The album cover, my sister took those photos in Dallas one day, and haters are gonna say that that bull is AI, but it is definitely not. We had my friend Evan bring a bull from his ranch, and we just rode around Dallas and would quickly get out and try to block traffic with some cones. We had no permits or anything."

— Musgraves, during an interview with NPR

Middle of Nowhere's cover artwork features Musgraves standing against a plain backdrop, wearing a felt Stetson, vintage Levi's, and a white tank top, with a spotted steer positioned behind her which her friend brought from his ranch. The photograph was taken in Deep Ellum, Dallas, by her sister Kelly Sutton after the pair spent an afternoon moving the animal through the area in search of a suitable setting. According to Musgraves, she was careful to present "those pieces of Texas and country life that often get overlooked" as opposed to something "cliche". She noted that the artwork was not artificially generated, despite assumptions to the contrary.

The title of Middle of Nowhere and its concept came from exploring Musgraves's roots in Texas. While wandering around her hometown, she noticed a sign that said, "Golden, Texas: Somewhere in the middle of nowhere". Musgraves stated that she found herself "being totally okay in this proverbial 'middle of nowhere'", and elaborated that it could describe someone "relationally or emotionally", between jobs, between relationships, or even in a geographic sense. She felt drawn to the physical liminal places like airport terminals.

== Composition ==
Middle of Nowhere is a country album that features elements of pop. Inspired by Musgraves's Texas upbringing, it draws on genres including Western swing; bluegrass; 1970s, 1980s, 1990s country; traditional Mexican music like norteño and mariachi; and zydeco. (Note: Attributed to multiple sources) It also features Tejano influences; Musgraves told W magazine that she "ha[d] always been such a fan of norteño and Tejano music", and the time she spent in Mexico "naturally" influenced the album's sound. NME's Cordelia Lam agreed, highlighting its Tejano sounds, while Steve Erickson of Slant Magazine observed its neotraditional country sound.

Some critics believed that Musgraves had returned to country music in Middle of Nowhere, which features sounds of accordion, pedal steel, and dancehall rhythms of Texas (Note: Attributed to Billboard, Beats Per Minute, Country Now, Flood Magazine, and Pitchfork)—a "sonic love letter to the musical borders of country", according to the press release. Other critics noted its prominent pedal steel sound throughout the album; Erickson believed that it often functions as a secondary melodic voice with restrained solos that emphasize its expressive tonal qualities, while Flood Magazine author Josh Hurst highlighted its pervasive use of twang and pedal steel, describing the record as Musgraves's most overtly country-oriented release. Middle of Nowhere also contains steel guitar and two-step elements reminiscent of waltz. (Note: Attributed to multiple sources)

Middle of Nowhere shares stylistic elements with Deeper Well, while it marks a more pronounced return to country influences. Its polished production, handled by Daniel Tashian and Ian Fitchuk, was seen by Grant Sharples of Paste as preventing it from fully recapturing the rustic character of Musgraves's earlier work, which results in a sound some viewed as transitional rather than ingenuity. Lyrically, Middle of Nowhere reintroduces a sharper lyrical edge with more pointed and incisive songwriting, in contrast to Deeper Well; Musgraves wrote its tracks "in the throes of Deeper Well".

=== Songs ===
"Middle of Nowhere"
The title track includes acoustic guitar sound, whose chorus is a different beat from the first verse.

Middle of Nowhere's title track features sounds of acoustic strums; it starts off with a gentle step, and in the chorus, it turns into a waltz sound. The song is set in 4/4 time during the verses, and 3/4 time in the chorus. In "Dry Spell", Musgraves uses double entendres in lines like "Ain't nobody's tool up in my shed... Ain't nobody's truck up in my drive." The ballad tracks, "Back on the Wagon" and "Uncertain, TX", are about a bitter and toxic relationship and contain what Laura Molloy of NME described as "line dance break[s]". The former track presents a style of Garth Brooks story about a woman repeatedly returning to a partner who promises to change, while its chorus plays on internal rhyme. "I Believe in Ghosts" is a pop song, marking a return to 1970s rock influences. The fifth track "Abilene" follows a woman who leaves the titular town in search of something better, drawing thematic parallels to "Blowin' Smoke" (2013), which described unrealized small-town aspirations.

"Coyote" adopts bluegrass elements and depicts a former lover who remains elusive, drawn to "pretty things that can't be held", according to Pitchfork's Molly Maren O'Brien. The seventh track "Loneliest Girl" features banjo elements, with a gentle pedal steel–driven arrangement and presents a narrator who insists she is content being alone. A collaboration with Miranda Lambert, "Horses and Divorces", is a norteño-influenced waltz that addresses their previously reported feud. The Guardian author Laura Snapes felt the track sounded like a country version of English singer Charli XCX's 2024 song "Girl, So Confusing" with Lorde. "Uncertain, TX", a collaboration with Willie Nelson, incorporates accordion and a shuffling rhythm influenced by cumbia, a genre with Colombian origins that later became famous in Mexico. On country-disco track "Rhinestoned", Musgraves combines elements of Nashville country style. It adopts a light, groove-driven style, while the next track "Mexico Honey" features rap-like verses and a looser and thrilled tone. The closing track "Hell on Me" is arranged with minimal instrumentation, built around acoustic guitar and pedal steel alongside Musgraves's vocals.

== Promotion ==
When a fan asked for details about the album on March 1, 2026, Musgraves replied four days later with a cow face emoji, echoing the cow imagery used in the promotional posters that soon began circulating online. That day, posters and billboards featuring an image of Musgraves with her back turned to the camera appeared in some major United States cities, including Nashville. The advertisements included the message "Dry Spell? Call for a Real Good Time." Calling the number displayed on the posters led to a recording that began with a three-tone sequence similar to the signal heard when a number is misdialed or out of service. In her Instagram page, she embedded a caption: "Welcome to the Middle of Nowhere".

On March 11, Musgraves unveiled Middle of Nowhere's cover artwork, release date, and track list along with the lead single, "Dry Spell". On April 15, she was announced as a surprise performer on the second weekend of Coachella 2026. During her set, she performed "Dry Spell" as the final song, debuting "Back on the Wagon", "Uncertain, TX", and the title track. Musgraves kept promoting her album prior to the release, singing "Mexico Honey" at London's Circuit and teasing "Rhinestoned" through her Instagram. On April 29, Spotify hosted an exclusive event for celebrating Middle of Nowhere's release. On May 5, Musgraves unveiled an exclusive edition through iTunes and her website, featuring two additional bonus tracks—her version of "All My Exes", and "Caballero". That day, she went to Walmart dressed as an armadillo to further promote the album.

=== Singles and music video ===
Musgraves released Middle of Nowhere's lead single, "Dry Spell", on March 11, 2026. Its music video was directed by Hannah Lux Davis and premiered on the same day; it takes place in a grocery store where Musgraves fantasizes about one of the employees. The single peaked at number 55 on the US Billboard Hot 100 as well as number 15 on the US Hot Country Songs chart. Released as the second single on April 17 ahead of Musgraves's Coachella performance, the title track "Middle of Nowhere" reached number 32 on the US Hot Country Songs chart.

"Loneliest Girl" was serviced on May 4 to US country radio, serving as the album's third single. It peaked number 36 on the US Hot Country Songs chart. "Mexico Honey", which peaked at numbers 39 and 12 on the Hot 100 and Hot Country Songs chart, respectively, was serviced to radio stations on July 10, marking Middle of Nowhere's fourth single. Musgraves released its music video on July 22; directed by Running Bear (Alexa Stone and Stephen Kinihopoulos) and filmed in Mexico, the visual depicts Musgraves and her onscreen love interest on a romantic getaway, serving as a tribute to the country's scenery and the experiences that inspired the song.

=== Live performances and tour ===
Musgraves performed at Gruene Hall for three nights in May to support the album with the Mariachi Brothers, a mariachi trio seeking asylum that were detained by United States Immigration and Customs Enforcement (ICE) at the Dilley detention camp. For further promotion, Musgraves announced the Middle of Nowhere Tour on April 29, 2026. It will begin at the United Center in Chicago on August 21, concluding at Climate Pledge Arena in Seattle on October 27; the tour is planned to concentrate on the songs her fans like, such as "Dry Spell", "Coyote", and "Loneliest Girl". Various musicians served as the tour's opening act: Midland, Flatland Cavalry, Carter Faith, Estevie, Charles Wesley Godwin, William Beckmann, Gabriella Rose, and the Brudi Brothers. Musgraves performed "Dry Spell" at the Academy of Country Music Awards on May 17.

Musgraves canceled three shows in Chicago, Boston, and Brooklyn, on July 25, without providing a reason. The canceled dates included the August 20 opening show at United Center in Chicago, the August 29 performance at TD Garden in Boston, and the September 2 concert at Barclays Center in Brooklyn. (Note: All three dates had been added after the original tour schedule was announced, and Musgraves still remained scheduled to perform in Chicago on August 21, Boston on August 28, and at New York's Madison Square Garden on August 31 and September 1.) Ticket holders were notified of the cancellations through Ticketmaster and were informed that refunds would be issued automatically. The cancellations prompted speculation among fans that they were related to ticket sales, though Musgraves and her representatives did not comment on the matter.

== Critical reception ==
Professional ratings
Aggregate scores
Source	Rating
AnyDecentMusic?	7.7/10
Metacritic	84/100
Review scores
Source	Rating
AllMusic	4.5/5 stars
Clash	8/10
The Guardian	4/5 stars
The Independent	5/5 stars
NME	3.5/5 stars
Paste	C
Pitchfork	7.6/10
PopMatters	7/10
Rolling Stone	4/5 stars
Slant Magazine	4/5 stars

According to the review aggregator Metacritic, Middle of Nowhere received "universal acclaim" based on a weighted average score of 84 out of 100 from 19 critic scores. The review aggregator AnyDecentMusic? assigned it a weighted average score of 7.7 out of 10 from 18 critic scores.

Critics highlighted Middle of Nowhere's themes of solitude, reflection, and self-definition. AllMusic's Neil Z. Yeung described it as capturing Musgraves in a "transition period", highlighting her movement toward "inner strength and a greater sense of contentment" as she rediscovers her connection to Texas and her own identity after previous relationship struggles. Tim Cumming of The Arts Desk wrote that Middle of Nowhere is shaped by post-breakup reflections and a feeling of isolation—noting that its central perspective is one of being "nowhere, and not even getting there fast". Similarly, NME's Cordelia Lam identified a central sense of chosen solitude, and emphasized its portrayal of independence rather than loneliness. Roisin O'Conner, writing for The Independent, also lauded a more resolved and purposeful tone compared to Deeper Well, alongside sharper lyricism and emotionally direct songwriting. Clash's Joshua Khan believed that Middle of Nowhere yearns for "simplicity", and described it as drawing on country and soul elements that are "spurred by uncomplicated bliss". He added that her voice "rarely complicates her desire to embrace the undefined". Josh Hurst of Flood Magazine depicted the album as being shaped by a "liminal" period between relationships; he interpreted its songs as reflections on solitude and the lessons drawn from an extended period of being alone.

Various reviewers focused on Middle of Nowhere's musical direction and genre blending. Writing for Riff Magazine, Pipe Westrom noted that she "turns inward" on the album while also expanding her sound. He highlighted its incorporation of influences from Texas and northern Mexico, and wrote that Musgraves balances humor with plainspoken lyricism while continuing to develop her musical style. Ljubinko Zivkovic of Beats Per Minute observed that while it appears rooted in traditional country elements, it instead integrates those elements into a broader stylistic framework. Writing for Pitchfork, Molly Mary O'Brien similarly characterized the record as an expansive yet focused survey of country music traditions, particularly emphasizing Musgraves's Texas heritage.

Critics also commented on the relationship of Middle of Nowhere to Musgraves's earlier work. Maya Georgi of Rolling Stone described it as a return to her roots, noting its "twangier" sound and framing it as a "hard-won homecoming", while Laura Snapes of The Guardian highlighted its arrangements and rural influences. Maria Sherman of Associated Press likewise noted a shift away from the folk-leaning sound of Deeper Well, though she argued that it does not fully replicate the style of Musgraves's earlier country records. Chris DeVille of Stereogum described the album as "full of such treasures", viewing it as a form of homecoming that still avoids strict genre boundaries. The New York Times author Lindsay Zoladz likewise viewed it as a return to form, and described it as Musgraves's strongest work since Golden Hour. She contrasted its more grounded tone with the relative serenity of Deeper Well, and interpreted the record as a meditation on the distinction between loneliness and solitude rather than a conventional breakup album.

The album's production and instrumentation were frequently discussed, particularly its use of regional styles. Steve Erickson of Slant Magazine observed a "palpable melancholy" in its arrangements; he noted their connection to the settings described in the lyrics and pointing to the incorporation of Mexican norteño influences. Hurst also characterized Middle of Nowhere as Musgraves's most overtly country-leaning release, as he noted its prominent use of pedal steel and twang alongside a comparatively "dusty" and restrained production style, in contrast to the more expansive sound of Golden Hour. PopMatters's Jefferey Davis considered the album as Musgraves's most traditionally country-oriented album in over a decade, and argued that its themes and narrative perspective retain broad emotional accessibility despite its more conservative production style.

Critical assessments of Middle of Nowhere's overall impact were mixed; Grant Sharples of Paste described it as a transitional work that does not reach the heights of Musgraves's earlier releases, though he considered it a competent addition to her catalog. In contrast, Lam praised its thematic cohesion and restrained sound, while O'Connor viewed it as a confident and purposeful statement. Sherman highlighted its strong songwriting despite its stylistic shifts—suggesting that its sense of space and scale contributes to its appeal. Richard Burn of Attitude noted that it is not strictly a breakup record, which centers on introspection and hindsight instead. He also portrayed the album as occupying a distinctive place in Musgraves's discography, combining a return to country elements with more contemporary production. Burn added that Middle of Nowhere should not be viewed as a continuation of Golden Hour.

Carena Liptak of Taste of Country rated "Uncertain, TX" as the "perfect song about a town full of disappointing men", ranking it the highest. Billboard's Melinda Newman thought "Coyote" is the album's best track, depicting it as "gorgeous and poignant". In the same review, Jessica Nicholson ranked "Abilene" the lowest, writing: "Musgraves'[s] haunting voice makes the song even more enchanting."

== Commercial performance ==
Middle of Nowhere debuted at number three on the US Billboard 200, with 100,000 album-equivalent units—Musgraves's best first week unit sales of her career and her sixth consecutive top ten debut on the chart. It also charted number one on the US Top Album Sales, Vinyl Albums, Indie Store Album Sales, and reached number 2 on the Top Country Albums and Americana/Folk Albums chart. In the United Kingdom, Middle of Nowhere opened at number seven and became Musgraves's fourth consecutive top 10 album on the UK Albums Chart. It also entered atop the UK Country Albums Chart, becoming her sixth consecutive album to reach the top spot on the chart; the album reached number two on the UK Americana Albums Chart.

Internationally, Middle of Nowhere charted within the top 20 in multiple countries, including Australia, Austria, Belgium (Flanders), Canada, Germany, New Zealand, and Switzerland. The album also reached number two on the Australian Country Albums chart and peaked at number four on the Scottish Albums Chart.

== Track listing ==
Standard edition
No.	Title	Writer(s)	Length
1.	"Middle of Nowhere"	Kacey Musgraves; Daniel Tashian; Ian Fitchuk	2:36
2.	"Dry Spell"	Musgraves; Luke Laird; Shane McAnally; Josh Osborne	3:18
3.	"Back on the Wagon"	Musgraves; Tashian; Fitchuk	3:51
4.	"I Believe in Ghosts"	Musgraves; Laird; McAnally	3:51
5.	"Abilene"	Musgraves; Laird; McAnally	2:48
6.	"Coyote" (featuring Gregory Alan Isakov)	Musgraves; Tashian; Fitchuk; Rick Nowels	3:12
7.	"Loneliest Girl"	Musgraves; Laird; McAnally; Osborne	4:16
8.	"Everybody Wants to Be a Cowboy" (featuring Billy Strings)	Musgraves; Tashian; Fitchuk	3:39
9.	"Horses and Divorces" (featuring Miranda Lambert)	Musgraves; McAnally; Miranda Lambert	2:43
10.	"Uncertain, TX" (featuring Willie Nelson)	Musgraves; Tashian	3:33
11.	"Rhinestoned"	Musgraves; Tashian; Fitchuk; Scotty Emerick	3:33
12.	"Mexico Honey"	Musgraves; Laird; Steph Jones	3:43
13.	"Hell on Me"	Musgraves; Laird; McAnally; Jones	3:08
Total length:			44:10

Bonus tracks
No.	Title	Writer(s)	Length
14.	"All My Exes" (Kacey's version)	Lyndia J. Shafer; Sanger D. Shafer; Musgraves; Josh Osborne
15.	"Caballero"	Musgraves; Tashian; Fitchuk

== Credits and personnel ==
The credits were adapted from the liner notes and Tidal.

=== Locations ===
- Recording: Sound Emporium, RCA Studio A, Royal Plum Studios, The Cabin, Blackbird Studio, The Study, East Iris Studios, The Saltmine Studio Oasis
- Engineering: MixStar Studios
- Mixing: MixStar Studios, The Study
- Mastering: Sterling Sound Nashville

=== Musicians ===
- Kacey Musgraves – vocals (all tracks), acoustic guitar (tracks 5, 9)
- Daniel Tashian – bass (1–4, 7), background vocals (1, 4–6, 11), acoustic guitar (1, 6, 8–11), electric guitar (2–4, 8–12), nylon-string guitar (2); percussion, piano (4); banjo, keyboards (5); slide guitar (6); lap steel guitar, shaker, tambourine (8); cowbell (9); 12-string acoustic guitar, drum machine (10); celesta, Rhodes (11); upright bass (12)
- Ian Fitchuk – drums (1–5, 7, 8, 10–12), acoustic guitar (1, 2, 6, 8), percussion (2, 7, 10, 11), congas (4, 12), bass (5, 6, 8, 10–12), guitar (5), keyboards (7, 12), accordion (10)
- Dan Dugmore – pedal steel guitar (1)
- Todd Lombardo – guitar (2, 6, 7, 12), acoustic guitar (4, 5, 7, 9–11, 13), banjo (4, 7), nylon-string guitar (9), 12-string acoustic guitar (11), mandolin (12)
- Luke Laird – electric guitar (2, 12), nylon-string guitar (2), guitar (7), acoustic guitar (12)
- Paul Franklin – pedal steel guitar (3, 4, 7, 9, 11, 13)
- Dennis Crouch – bass (3)
- Gregory Alan Isakov – background vocals (6)
- Shawn Everett – harmonica (6)
- Justin Schipper – pedal steel guitar (7)
- Billy Strings – vocals, guitar (8)
- Fred Eltringham – drums, percussion (9)
- Rob Burger – accordion (9)
- Miranda Lambert – vocals (9)
- Willie Nelson – vocals, guitar (10)
- Steph Jones – background vocals (12)
- Russ Pahl – pedal steel guitar (12)

=== Technical ===
- Kacey Musgraves – production
- Daniel Tashian – production
- Ian Fitchuk – production (1–8, 10–13)
- Luke Laird – production (2, 7), additional engineering (2), engineering assistance (12)
- Konrad Snyder – mixing (5, 6, 9, 10, 13), engineering (1–8, 10–13)
- Bryce Bordone – engineering (1–4, 7, 8, 11, 12)
- Mike Stankiewicz – engineering (9)
- Shani Ghandi – engineering (9)
- Joanna Finley – additional engineering (7), engineering assistance (2)
- David Paulin – engineering assistance (1–8, 10–13)
- Phillip Smith – engineering assistance (8)
- Grant Morgan – engineering assistance (9)
- Velvet Cash – engineering assistance (9)
- Serban Ghenea – mixing (1–4, 7, 8, 11, 12)
- Adam Grover – mastering, immersive mastering
- Todd Lombardo – digital editing (1)
- Mike Poole – immersive mixing

== Charts ==
Chart performance
Chart (2026)	Peak position
Australian Albums (ARIA)	17
Australian Country Albums (ARIA)	2
Austrian Albums (Ö3 Austria)	11
Belgian Albums (Ultratop Flanders)	19
Belgian Albums (Ultratop Wallonia)	53
Canadian Albums (Billboard)	11
Dutch Albums (Album Top 100)	22
French Physical Albums (SNEP)	51
German Albums (Offizielle Top 100)	14
Irish Albums (Official Charts)	40
New Zealand Albums (RMNZ)	16
Norwegian Albums (IFPI Norge)	90
Scottish Albums (Official Charts)	4
Swedish Physical Albums (Sverigetopplistan)	12
Swiss Albums (Schweizer Hitparade)	20
UK Albums (Official Charts)	7
UK Americana Albums (Official Charts)	2
UK Country Albums (Official Charts)	1
US Billboard 200	3
US Americana/Folk Albums (Billboard)	2
US Top Country Albums (Billboard)	2

== Release history ==
Release date and formats
Region	Date	Format	Label	Ref.
Various	May 1, 2026	Cassette; CD; digital download; streaming; vinyl	Lost Highway	
