= Dry Spell (song) =

Single by Kacey Musgraves

from the album Middle of Nowhere
- Released: March 11, 2026
- Length: 3:18
- Label: Lost Highway
- Songwriters: Kacey Musgraves; Luke Laird; Shane McAnally; Josh Osborne
- Producers: Kacey Musgraves; Daniel Tashian; Ian Fitchuk; Luke Laird

Kacey Musgraves singles chronology
"Lost Highway" (2025)	"Dry Spell" (2026)	"Middle of Nowhere" (2026)

Music video
- "Dry Spell" on YouTube

"Dry Spell" is a song by the American singer-songwriter Kacey Musgraves. It was released on March 11, 2026, through Lost Highway Records. The song serves as the lead single from Musgraves's seventh studio album, Middle of Nowhere (2026).

== Background and release ==
In February 2026, Musgraves posted on X, "Is it possible to die from horniness? Asking for a friend." The post resurfaced the following week when she reposted it shortly before the release of "Dry Spell". After completing the international leg of her Deeper Well Tour, the singer announced her seventh studio album, Middle of Nowhere, scheduled for release on May 1, 2026. "Dry Spell" was released on March 11, as the album's lead single alongside its music video.

== Composition ==
Consequence author Chris Coplan described "Dry Spell" as "boldly hilarious and self-aware" and noted that it "blazes with sharp wit while delivering tight turns of phrase". Coplan added that the song finds Musgraves revisiting familiar musical territory with a renewed sense of enthusiasm and curiosity. Lily Goldberg of Pitchfork observed that the song is framed as "a playful confession of boredom", calling it unapologetic but "ultimately bloodless", where "the subjects of lust matter less than the fact that they don't exist". The Fader's Tobias Hess noted that "Dry Spell" addresses the frustration of a "dry spell"; its chorus continues the theme through extended metaphors about longing for a partner, including the lines "Ain't nobody's tool up in my shed / Ain't nobody's boots under my bed".

== Critical reception ==
Writing for Pitchfork, Lily Goldberg remarked that the use of "y'all" indicates the song is not an attempt at seduction, contrasting it with songs such as "Roommates" by Hilary Duff, which Goldberg described as part of the "women in their late thirties can be horny, too" canon. Jillian Giandurco from Nylon described the song as "twangy", "clever", and "horny", while Melinda Newman of Billboard depicted the track as "humorous, twangy" song. Variety's Chris Willman suggested that the song signals a broader return to the country-influenced sound and sense of humor associated with Musgraves's early work. Willman noted that its lyrics humorously depict the singer counting the days since her last relationship, highlighted by lines such as "I'm so lonely, lonely with a capital H / If you know what I mean / I've been sitting on the washing machine". Erinn Callahan from American Songwriter also highlighted these lyrics, describing the track as "chock full of the witty wordplay that made Kacey Musgraves famous".

== Music video ==
The music video for "Dry Spell" was co-directed by Musgraves and Hannah Lux Davis, and premiered alongside its release on March 11, 2026. In it, Musgraves is shown arriving at a grocery store dressed in a very casual outfit, only to be confronted with "suspiciously suggestive visual double entendres" as she walks around perusing the store's merchandise.

== Live performances ==
Musgraves performed "Dry Spell" live on the 61st Academy of Country Music Awards on May 17, 2026. It marked a career-first live performance on the awards show by Musgraves.

== Charts ==
=== Weekly charts ===
Weekly chart performance
Chart (2026)	Peak position
Canada Hot 100 (Billboard)	63
Canada Country (Billboard)	32
Denmark Airplay (Tracklisten)	10
Estonia Airplay (TopHit)	71
Japan Hot Overseas (Billboard Japan)	10
Latvia Airplay (TopHit)	28
New Zealand Hot Singles (RMNZ)	16
UK Singles Sales (OCC)	71
UK Country Airplay (Radiomonitor)	5
US Billboard Hot 100	55
US Adult Alternative Airplay (Billboard)	6
US Country Airplay (Billboard)	34
US Hot Country Songs (Billboard)	15

=== Monthly charts ===
Monthly chart performance
Chart (2026)	Peak position
Estonia Airplay (TopHit)	84

== Release history ==
List of release dates
Region	Date	Format(s)	Label	Ref.
Various	March 11, 2026	Digital download; streaming	Lost Highway	
