= Mexico Honey =

- Promotional poster

Single by Kacey Musgraves

from the album Middle of Nowhere
- Released: July 10, 2026
- Length: 3:43
- Label: Lost Highway
- Songwriters: Kacey Musgraves; Luke Laird; Steph Jones
- Producers: Kacey Musgraves; Daniel Tashian; Ian Fitchuk

Music video
- "Mexico Honey" on YouTube

"Mexico Honey" is a song by American singer Kacey Musgraves from her seventh studio album, Middle of Nowhere (2026). She wrote the song, produced by Daniel Tashian and Ian Fitchuk, with Luke Laird and Steph Jones. It was released as a single on July 10, 2026.

== Composition ==
"Mexico Honey" incorporates Latin pop and Tejano sounds, while Kacey Musgraves delivers a rap-like vocal style. In the lyrics, she describes being enamored with a cowboy and implies sexual desires.

== Critical reception ==
Billboard placed "Mexico Honey" at number eight in its ranking of the 13 tracks on Middle of Nowhere, commenting that the rapid-fire delivery and "dreamy" bridge respectively add to the "flirty fun" and "sexy, romantic vibe" of the song. Joshua Khan of Clash wrote that the song "proves that her pen is still razor sharp". Isabel Glasgow of Exclaim! praised the song's Mexican influence, calling it a "badass move to spread love in the face of fear and hate". Reviewing the album for The Independent, Roisin O'Connor commented "it's hard to resist her gentle urging to kick back with her" on the song, which she described as "unapologetically horny". Cordelia Lam of NME named it one of the album's standouts, in which "Musgraves'[s] honeyed vocals and hazy sensibilities converge with her Texan roots in magical ways".

Carena Liptak of Taste of Country ranked "Mexico Honey" last among the songs from Middle of Nowhere, believing that it did not fit on the album due to its subject matter. Lindsey Zoldaz of The New York Times considered it the album's "only real misfire" and an "indicator that the 'dry spell' announced toward the beginning of the album is over." Rolling Stone added "Mexico Honey" to their list of the Best Song of 2026 So Far.

== Music video ==
The official music video was released on July 22, 2026. Directed by Running Bear (Alexa Stone and Stephen Kinigopoulos) and filmed in Mexico, it opens with a close-up of Musgraves' lips as she sings, while sitting in the front seat of a car. She is next seen singing the song at a karaoke bar, where she meets a tattooed cowboy whom she forms a connection with. The pair ride together in a car, where she hangs her hair out a window, as they explore the streets of Mexico. They share intimate moments, such as kissing, hugging, showering and smoking together, laughing in the bathroom, lounging in bed, and exchanging romantic glances; The video also takes them to a rainforest setting, where Musgraves wades through a river while holding a yellow boa constrictor, also wrapped around her arms, shoulders and torso. In another scene, she poses nude with a parrot perching on her hand. Near the end, honey is poured across her lover's half-naked body, while a black panther watches Musgraves from a distance. In the ending, Musgraves, in a flowing white dress, jumps into the arms of her lover, who is also dressed in white.

== Charts ==
Chart performance
Chart (2026)	Peak position
Canada Hot 100 (Billboard)	62
US Billboard Hot 100	39
US Hot Country Songs (Billboard)	11
