= 2027 in country music =

This is a list of notable events in country music that will occur in 2027.

== Top new album releases ==
=== Upcoming ===
Album	Artist	Record label	Release date	Reference
The Bird	Brandy Clark	Reprise Records	January 8	
Tex Mex Tapes	Kacey Musgraves	Lost Highway	January 15	
Outskirts of Town	Mo Pitney	Curb Records	March 26	
