= Horses and Divorces =

2026 song by Kacey Musgraves

Song by Kacey Musgraves featuring Miranda Lambert

from the album Middle of Nowhere
- Released: May 1, 2026
- Genre: Country
- Length: 2:43
- Label: Lost Highway
- Songwriters: Kacey Musgraves; Shane McAnally; Miranda Lambert
- Producers: Kacey Musgraves; Daniel Tashian; Ian Fitchuk

Lyric video
- "Horses and Divorces" on YouTube

"Horses and Divorces" is a song by American singer and songwriter Kacey Musgraves from her seventh studio album, Middle of Nowhere (2026). Featuring American singer Miranda Lambert, it was written by the two artists alongside Shane McAnally. The song received a nomination for Musical Event of the Year at the 60th Annual Country Music Association Awards, as well as for Best Country Duo/Group Performance at the 69th Annual Grammy Awards

== Background ==
The song marks the end of a feud between the two singers that began in 2011, when Musgraves wrote Lambert's song "Mama's Broken Heart". Musgraves had planned to record the song as her debut single, but it was pitched to Lambert without her consent or knowledge. Lambert really wanted the song, which Musgraves reluctantly gave to her and went on to become a major success. Although the song boosted her reputation as a songwriter, Musgraves developed resentment toward Lambert as a result and they lost touch.

After a decade of tension, the two reconciled after Musgraves saw an Instagram post of Lambert riding one of her horses. She realized they both shared common ground through their love of horses and their experiences with divorce, which inspired an idea for a song. Musgraves subsequently reached out to Lambert about collaborating on the track. During their writing session, Lambert expressed gratitude to Musgraves for writing "Mama's Broken Heart", which she credited with contributing to the continued success of her career.

== Composition ==
The song is a waltz composed of an undulating drum pattern, steel guitar and accordion, alongside norteño influences and a mariachi band. In the lyrics, the singers first addresses their past issues, acknowledging that they have exchanged subtle disses over the years. before bonding over shared interests and experiences, such as horses, divorces, drinking alcohol, their Texas backgrounds, Willie Nelson's music, smoking and cursing. In one line, Lambert jokes about Musgraves's fondness for marijuana, while Musgraves responds with a reference to Lambert's love of pyrotechnics. They dismiss their feud as "whiskey under the bridge".

== Critical reception ==
The song received generally positive reviews. Carena Liptak of Taste of Country ranked it as the third best song from Middle of Nowhere, while Billboard placed it at number 12 in their ranking of the 13 tracks on Middle of Nowhere, calling it a "fun novelty song that buries the hatchet and entertains, but seems like a bit of an outlier." Maxim Mower of Holler considered the song a "wonderfully traditional ode" to the artists' Texas heritage and described their Southern drawls as charismatic. Laura Snapes of The Guardian described the song as "country's 'Girl, So Confusing'", calling it a "reconciliatory – but raucous – duet with old foe Miranda Lambert that resounds with the lightness of letting go." Lindsey Zoldaz of The New York Times called it a "hilarious and gorgeously lush duet". Reviewing Middle of Nowhere for NME, Cordelia Lam described the song as "camp", "catty" and among the "familiar flashes of Musgraves' quintessential comic bite." Maya Georgi of Rolling Stone described it as "supremely Texan and quite great to hear" the two singers "go bar for bar".

== Charts ==
Chart performance for "Horses and Divorces"
Chart (2026)	Peak position
New Zealand Hot Singles (RMNZ)	19
US Billboard Hot 100	84
US Hot Country Songs (Billboard)	23
