= Deeper Well =

- Standard cover

Studio album by Kacey Musgraves
- Released: March 15, 2024
- Studios: Electric Lady (New York): Blackbird (Nashville); RCA Studio A (Nashville); The Study (Nashville); Southern Ground (Nashville); Sound Emporium (Nashville); Whale Tale (Goleta)
- Genres: Country folk; soft rock; folk-pop
- Length: 42:02
- Labels: MCA Nashville; Interscope
- Producers: Kacey Musgraves; Daniel Tashian; Ian Fitchuk

Kacey Musgraves chronology
Star-Crossed (2021)	Deeper Well (2024)	Middle of Nowhere (2026)

Singles from Deeper Well
- 1. "Deeper Well" Released: February 8, 2024; 2. "Too Good to Be True" Released: February 29, 2024; 3. "Cardinal" Released: March 15, 2024; 4. "The Architect" Released: March 25, 2024

Singles from Deeper into the Well
- 1. "Irish Goodbye" Released: July 26, 2024

Deeper Well is the sixth studio album by American singer and songwriter Kacey Musgraves, released on March 15, 2024, by MCA Nashville and Interscope Records. It was supported by the release of four singles: "Deeper Well, "Too Good to Be True", "Cardinal", and "The Architect". The lattermost won the Grammy Award for Best Country Song.

To support Deeper Well, Musgraves embarked on the Deeper Well World Tour from April 2024 to December 2024. An expanded edition of the album, subtitled Deeper into the Well, was released on August 2, 2024. The album received favorable reviews from music critics and earned three nominations at the 67th Annual Grammy Awards, including for Best Country Album.

Commercially, the album became Musgraves's best project in terms of sales in its first week worldwide. In the United States, it debuted at number two on the Billboard 200, while debuting at number three in the United Kingdom on the Official Albums Chart, becoming the singer's highest entry on both charts.

== Release and promotion ==
Musgraves teased the project on February 4, 2024, during a 66th Annual Grammy Awards commercial titled "My Saturn Has Returned". The eponymous lead single was released with an accompanying music video alongside the album announcement days later on February 8. Inspiration for the song came through change in feelings and sentiments that might be off-putting at first but equips one with "new insight and deeper love somewhere else". It was followed by the second single, "Too Good to Be True", on February 29. The music video of the song premiered later on March 15, the same day the album and third single "Cardinal" was officially released. On March 25, "The Architect" was released, serving as the fourth single from the album. A digital deluxe edition of the album, containing the bonus track "Ruthless", was available during the album's release week. On July 26, Musgraves released the single "Irish Goodbye" and announced an expanded version of the album, subtitled Deeper into the Well, which was released on August 2. Its release was accompanied by farmer's market pop-up shops in four cities in the US. The Deeper into the Well tracks were released independently on vinyl as part of Record Store Day Black Friday 2024, backed with 20 minutes of woodland sounds.

On February 29, 2024, Musgraves announced she would perform shows in Europe and North America for the Deeper Well World Tour in support of the album. The tour commenced on April 28 in Dublin, Ireland, and concluded on December 7, in Nashville, Tennessee. On March 2, Musgraves took the stage as musical guest on Saturday Night Live for the third time of her career and performed "Too Good to Be True" and "Deeper Well".

== Composition ==
Deeper Well was described as a country folk, soft rock, and folk-pop album. It was co-produced and co-written by Musgraves, Daniel Tashian, and Ian Fitchuk, with the exception of the tracks "Sway", which includes songwriter Tommy English, and "The Architect", which was crafted with Shane McAnally and Josh Osborne. Musgraves recorded the album at the Electric Lady Studios in New York City, which she thinks "has the best mojo" while she was "seeking some different environmental energy". It reflects on the changes and priorities that occurred in her life after the age of 27, spurred by the "cosmos as Saturn's return".

== Critical reception ==
Professional ratings
Aggregate scores
Source	Rating
AnyDecentMusic?	7.3/10
Metacritic	78/100
Review scores
Source	Rating
AllMusic	3.5/5 stars
The Daily Telegraph	5/5 stars
The Guardian	3/5 stars
The Independent	5/5 stars
The Line of Best Fit	7/10
NME	3/5 stars
Paste	8.4/10
Pitchfork	6.8/10
Slant Magazine	3.5/5 stars
Sputnikmusic	4/5 stars

At Metacritic, which assigns a normalized rating out of 100 to reviews from mainstream critics, the album received an average score of 78 based on 20 reviews, indicating "generally favorable reviews". The review aggregator site AnyDecentMusic? compiled 21 reviews and gave Deeper Well an average of 7.3 out of 10, based on their assessment of the critical consensus.

Tony Clayton-Lea of The Irish Times dubbed Deeper Well "another jewel in the crown" describing it as "politically aware" and "personally revealing". Thomas Bedenbaugh of Slant Magazine praised the concept of the album and considered the lyrics mostly live up to Musgraves's standards, even though some "fall flat". Mary Siroky of Consequence called the lyrics of the album "poetic" and saw the album as a "conversation with a friend" and a "great companion listen" to Musgraves's fourth studio album, Golden Hour, praising the "dreamy mood" of the album.

In a review for Paste, Eric Bennett called Deeper Well her "most sonically cohesive album to date" describing the album as "refreshing" and "rife" with "clear-eyed" songs. Roisin O'Connor of The Independent also praised the cohesive sound of the album, calling the album a "revelation". Pitchfork's writer Laura Snapes described the album as "sympathetically fame-agnostic and focused on steadying Musgraves' axi" but the songs "aren't particularly satisfying when you know what she's capable of", comparing the project as "the latest addition to a canon of refusenik pop records from young women burned by the spotlight". Sophie Williams of NME praised the "assertiveness" of Musgraves on the "sparse compositions that run through this thoughtful, imperfect, down-to-earth record", described as "the excitement of a fresh start".

== Commercial performance ==
Deeper Well debuted at number two on the US Billboard 200 chart with 97,000 album-equivalent units, including 38.06 million on-demand streams and 66,000 album sales in its first week, behind Ariana Grande's Eternal Sunshine (2024). It became Musgraves's fifth top-ten album on the chart and her biggest week ever by both equivalent album units and traditional album sales. The album also debuted at number one on the Top Country Albums and Americana/Folk Albums, respectively becoming Musgraves fifth and third project to achieve it.

In the United Kingdom the album debuted at number three on the UK Albums Chart, becoming Musgraves's highest-charting album and her third consecutive top-ten project after Golden Hour (2018) and Star-Crossed (2021). It also debuted at number one on the UK Country Albums Chart, becoming her fifth consecutive album to reach the top spot on that chart.

== Track listing ==
All tracks are written by Kacey Musgraves, Daniel Tashian, and Ian Fitchuk, with the exception of "Sway" and "Little Sister", which include songwriter Tommy English, as well as "The Architect" and "Arm's Length", which were written by Musgraves with Shane McAnally and Josh Osborne.

Standard edition
No.	Title	Length
1.	"Cardinal"	3:11
2.	"Deeper Well"	3:52
3.	"Too Good to Be True"	2:40
4.	"Moving Out"	3:09
5.	"Giver / Taker"	3:10
6.	"Sway"	3:11
7.	"Dinner with Friends"	2:57
8.	"Heart of the Woods"	2:16
9.	"Jade Green"	2:58
10.	"The Architect"	2:57
11.	"Lonely Millionaire"	3:06
12.	"Heaven Is"	2:44
13.	"Anime Eyes"	3:18
14.	"Nothing to Be Scared Of"	2:33
Total length:		42:02

Deeper into the Well extended track listing
No.	Title	Length
15.	"Ruthless"	3:26
16.	"Little Sister"	3:03
17.	"Flower Child"	2:38
18.	"Superbloom" (featuring Leon Bridges)	3:02
19.	"Perfection" (featuring Tiny Habits)	2:56
20.	"Arm's Length"	3:58
21.	"Irish Goodbye"	2:19
Total length:		63:24

=== Notes ===
- "Too Good to Be True" interpolates "Breathe (2 AM)" by Anna Nalick, who is therefore credited as a songwriter on the track.
- "Lonely Millionaire" interpolates "Kody Blu 31" by JID.
- "Heaven Is" interpolates the Scottish folk song "Ca' the yowes to the knowes".

== Personnel ==
Credits were adapted from the album's standard and deluxe edition liner notes.

- Kacey Musgraves – vocals, production (all tracks); dulcimer (track 9), mandolin (21), art direction
- Daniel Tashian – production (all tracks), recording (1–15), synthesizer (1, 2, 5, 6, 9, 11, 13, 15, 18), background vocals (1, 3–6, 8, 9, 12, 14, 17, 21), 12-string acoustic guitar (1, 8), clave (1), bass (2–4, 13, 16, 18, 20), acoustic guitar (2, 3, 6, 7, 12, 14, 16, 17, 19, 21), slide guitar (4, 5, 7, 15, 19), Moog bass (6), ukulele (7); vocals, banjo (10); piano (11, 15, 19, 21), Mellotron (11, 17, 19), electric guitar (11, 17), keyboards (14), drums (15, 21)
- Ian Fitchuk – production (all tracks), drums (1–5, 7, 11, 13, 17–20), acoustic guitar (1, 3, 5, 8, 9, 11, 14, 15, 18, 19, 21), percussion (1, 3, 6, 9, 14, 18), bass (1, 5–9, 11, 15, 17, 21), synthesizer (2, 3, 11, 13, 20), Mellotron (4), keyboards (5, 16), background vocals (6), piano (7, 10, 14, 16), organ (8, 12), electric guitar (8, 15), snare drum (12), synth bass (19)
- Todd Lombardo – acoustic guitar (1–5, 10, 11, 13, 15, 18, 20), guitar (2, 7, 8, 12, 14), banjo (4, 5, 15, 18, 20), editing (10, 18), classical guitar (11), slide 12-string guitar (13), hi-string guitar (18, 20)
- Viktor Krauss – bass (1)
- Russ Pahl – pedal steel (3, 15)
- Greg Leisz – steel guitar (7)
- Matt Combs – violins, viola, cello (9, 11, 12, 15, 17, 18)
- Lex Price – bass (14)
- Jim Hoke – flute (17)
- Leon Bridges – vocals (18)
- Jeff Bhasker – organ, piano, additional production (18)
- Dan Dugmore – pedal steel guitar (19, 21)
- Tiny Habits – vocals (19)
- Konrad Snyder – recording (all tracks), mixing (1, 4–6, 10, 15–21), additional mixing (13)
- Craig Alvin – recording (1–14)
- John Rooney – recording (1–14)
- Mai Leisz – additional engineering (7)
- Shawn Everett – mixing (2, 3, 7–9, 11–15)
- Andy Cata – mixing assistance (15)
- Frank McDonough – production coordination
- Kristen Clark – production coordination
- Mackenzie Moore – art direction, design
- Kelly Christine Sutton – art direction, (Note: Deeper Well releases only.) photography
- Ashley Kohorst – art direction
- Lucia Kaminsky – art direction (Note: Deeper into the Well deluxe release only.)
- Giovanni Delgado – hair and make-up
- Moani Lee – hair and make-up
- Erica Cloud – wardrobe
- Maddie Louviere – wardrobe assistance
- Laura Phillips – art production
- Manuel Almeida – gatefold collage

== Charts ==
=== Weekly charts ===
Chart (2024)	Peak position
Australian Albums (ARIA)	26
Australian Country Albums (ARIA)	5
Austrian Albums (Ö3 Austria)	42
Belgian Albums (Ultratop Flanders)	29
Belgian Albums (Ultratop Wallonia)	125
Canadian Albums (Billboard)	7
Dutch Albums (Album Top 100)	9
German Albums (Offizielle Top 100)	28
Irish Albums (Official Charts)	18
New Zealand Albums (RMNZ)	9
Scottish Albums (Official Charts)	1
Spanish Albums (PROMUSICAE)	66
Swiss Albums (Schweizer Hitparade)	60
UK Albums (Official Charts)	3
UK Americana Albums (Official Charts)	1
UK Country Albums (Official Charts)	1
US Billboard 200	2
US Americana/Folk Albums (Billboard)	1
US Top Country Albums (Billboard)	1

=== Year-end charts ===
Chart (2024)	Position
Australian Country Albums (ARIA)	53
US Top Country Albums (Billboard)	46
