= The Architect (Kacey Musgraves song) =

- Apple Shaped 7"

Single by Kacey Musgraves

from the album Deeper Well
- Written: 2023
- Released: March 25, 2024
- Studio: Electric Lady, New York City
- Genre: Country-folk
- Length: 2:57
- Label: Interscope; MCA Nashville
- Songwriters: Kacey Musgraves; Josh Osborne; Shane McAnally
- Producers: Kacey Musgraves; Daniel Tashian; Ian Fitchuk

Kacey Musgraves singles chronology
"Cardinal" (2024)	"The Architect" (2024)	"Irish Goodbye" (2024)

Music video
- "The Architect" on YouTube

"The Architect" is a song recorded by American singer-songwriter Kacey Musgraves for her sixth studio album, Deeper Well (2024). Musgraves wrote the song with Josh Osborne and Shane McAnally in early 2023 and produced it with Daniel Tashian and Ian Fitchuk. "The Architect" was released to country radio as the album's fourth single on March 25, 2024. A song pondering the existence of God, the song was written in the aftermath of the 2023 Nashville school shooting as the songwriters discussed how a creator deity could let bad things happen.

Critics have praised "The Architect" for its songwriting and the song won Best Country Song at the 67th Annual Grammy Awards, in addition to being nominated for Best Country Solo Performance. Musgraves has performed "The Architect" on The Tonight Show Starring Jimmy Fallon, Today, Austin City Limits, and the 58th Annual Country Music Association Awards, as well as on the Deeper Well World Tour (2024). A music video for the song was released in December 2024.

== Background and composition ==
"The Architect" was the last song written for Deeper Well; Musgraves had initially considered the album complete but met with Josh Osborne and Shane McAnally for another songwriting session in Nashville early 2023. The three were horrified following a school shooting in the city a few weeks prior that killed six people, and started discussing "the beauty and the terror of being a human". Musgraves had the song's title in mind and was holding a green apple, while Osborne came up with the line "Can I speak to the architect?".

The ballad's lyrics ponder the existence of God and wonder how a creator could let bad things happen. Its lyrics ask a number of questions, such as "Does it happen by chance? Is it all happenstance? / Do we have any say in this mess? / Is it too late to make some more space?". Musgraves produced the song with Ian Fitchuk and Daniel Tashian; the two also contributed to the track as pianist and banjoist, respectively. MCA Nashville sent "The Architect" to country radio stations in the US on March 25, 2024.

== Critical reception ==
"The Architect" has received positive reviews from critics, with praise for its songwriting. Brittney McKenna of Nashville Scene called it "one of the best songs Musgraves has ever written", while Jessica Nicholson of Billboard called it "sublime" and a "musical triumph". Sputnikmusic proclaimed it "brilliant musically and lyrically". In a ranking of songs from Deeper Well, Billboard's Melinda Newman placed "The Architect" in fourth place. Billboard additionally ranked the song at number two on its list of the ten best country songs of 2024. Taste of Country placed it at number three on its list of the Top 40 Country Songs of 2024.

On the other hand, Thomas Bedenbaugh of Slant Magazine felt the song used too many clichés while Rachel Aroesti of The Guardian called the song "irritatingly twee". Meanwhile, Joseph Hudak of Rolling Stone disagreed that "The Architect" was twee, calling it an "elegant, deep thinker" instead, and opining that Musgraves should win the Grammy Award for Best Country Song.

Musgraves received four Grammy Award nominations for the ceremony in 2025, with "The Architect" winning Best Country Song, as well as being nominated for Best Country Solo Performance. Meanwhile, Deeper Well received a nomination for Best Country Album. Musgraves was also nominated for Best Americana Performance as a featured artist on Madi Diaz's "Don't Do Me Good", while the engineers of Deeper Well were nominated in the category of Best Engineered Album, Non-Classical.

== Promotion ==
Musgraves first performed "The Architect" on The Tonight Show Starring Jimmy Fallon on March 14, 2024, and on Today the next day. "The Architect" was included in the set list of the Deeper Well World Tour, which commenced in April 2024. Musgraves performed the song for the premiere of season 50 of Austin City Limits, which aired on September 28, 2024. Additionally, "The Architect" was performed at the 58th Annual Country Music Association Awards on November 20, 2024, which Rolling Stone praised as one of the best performances of the evening.

The music video for "The Architect" was released on December 4, 2024, and features Musgraves as an earth mother who assembles a jigsaw puzzle and rolls around naked in mud. A press release from Universal Music Group Nashville describes the video as "an earthy and majestic ode to the wonders of nature". A puzzle of the single art for "The Architect" was released through Musgraves' online store, as well as guitar tab sheet music for the song. An apple-shaped 7-inch vinyl, featuring a version recorded live at Electric Lady Studios as the B-side, was released in February 2025.

== Track listing ==
7-inch vinyl

1. "The Architect" – 2:57
2. "The Architect" – live from Electric Lady Studios, New York (from Apple Music Live) – 2:55

== Personnel ==
Adapted from the liner notes of Deeper Well.

- Kacey Musgraves – songwriter, production, lead vocals
- Josh Osborne – songwriter
- Shane McAnally – songwriter
- Ian Fitchuk – producer, piano
- Daniel Tashian – producer, background vocals, banjo
- Todd Lombardo – acoustic guitar, editing
- Greg Calbi – mastering
- Konrad Snyder – mixing

== Charts ==
Chart performance for "The Architect"
Chart (2024)	Peak position
New Zealand Hot Singles (RMNZ)	35
UK Singles Sales (OCC)	23
US Bubbling Under Hot 100 (Billboard)	22
US Hot Country Songs (Billboard)	38
