= Deeper Well World Tour =

2024 concert tour by Kacey Musgraves

- Tour by Kacey Musgraves
- Location: North America and Europe
- Associated album: Deeper Well
- Start date: April 28, 2024
- End date: December 7, 2024
- Legs: 2
- No. of shows: 36 in North America; 13 in Europe; 49 in total
- Supporting acts: Madi Diaz; Father John Misty; Nickel Creek; Lord Huron

Kacey Musgraves concert chronology
- Star-Crossed: Unveiled (2022); Deeper Well World Tour (2024); Middle of Nowhere Tour (2026)

The Deeper Well World Tour was the seventh headlining concert tour by American country music singer-songwriter Kacey Musgraves in support of her sixth studio album, Deeper Well (2024). The tour commenced on April 28, 2024, in Dublin, Ireland and concluded in Nashville, Tennessee on December 7. It took place across cities in North America and Europe, comprising 49 shows. Madi Diaz, Father John Misty, Nickel Creek and Lord Huron served as opening acts.

== Background ==
On February 29, 2024, Musgraves formally announced the tour, with 48 shows across Europe and North America from April through December 2024. Tickets went on sale on March 8, with an artist presale running from March 5 until March 7. A new single for Deeper Well titled "Too Good to Be True" was released in conjunction with the tour announcement. Musgraves added second dates for Amsterdam, Glasgow, London and Dublin due to "high demand".

== Set list ==
=== Europe ===
The following set list is obtained from the April 28, 2024 show in Dublin. It is not intended to represent all dates throughout the tour.

1. "Cardinal"
2. "Moving Out"
3. "Deeper Well"
4. "Sway"
5. "Too Good to Be True"
6. "Butterflies"
7. "Giver / Taker"
8. "Lonely Weekend"
9. "Lonely Millionaire"
10. "Follow Your Arrow"
11. "The Architect"
12. "Heaven Is"
13. "Jade Green"
14. "Rainbow"
15. "Golden Hour"
16. "Anime Eyes"
17. "I Remember Everything"
18. "High Horse"
19. "Merry Go 'Round"
20. "Slow Burn"
21. "Three Little Birds" (Bob Marley and the Wailers cover)
22. "Easier Said"

=== North America ===
This set list is representative of the show on September 7, 2024. It does not represent all concerts for the duration of the tour.

1. "Cardinal"
2. "Butterflies"
3. "Sway"
4. "Golden Hour"
5. "Happy & Sad"
6. "Lonely Weekend"
7. "Lonely Millionaire"
8. "Follow Your Arrow"
9. "Giver / Taker"
10. "The Architect"
11. "Kill Bill" (SZA cover)
12. "Jade Green"
13. "Slow Burn"
14. "Space Cowboy"
15. "Justified"
16. "Pink Pony Club" (Chappell Roan cover)
17. "High Horse"
18. "Deeper Well"
19. "Rainbow"

=== Notes ===
- During the second show in Dublin, Musgraves performed a new song titled "Irish Goodbye" in place of "Easier Said".
- Starting with the first show in Amsterdam, Musgraves added "Heart of the Woods" to the setlist in place of "Moving Out".
- Starting with the show in Cologne, Musgraves added "Justified" to the setlist.
- Starting the first show in Glasgow, Musgraves added "Happy & Sad" and "Breadwinner" to the setlist in place of "Giver / Taker" and "Merry Go 'Round".
- During the shows in London, Madi Diaz joined Musgraves onstage to perform "Don't Do Me Good".
- Starting with the show in Grand Rapids, "Family Is Family" replaced "Giver / Taker" on the setlist.
- During the Louisville show on November 12 and the Brooklyn show on November 15th, Musgraves performed "Neon Moon" (Brooks & Dunn Cover) between "Justified" and "High Horse".

== Tour dates ==
List of concerts, showing date, city, country, venue, opening acts, attendance and gross revenue
Date (2024)	City	Country	Venue	Opening act(s)	Attendance	Revenue
April 28	Dublin	Ireland	3Olympia Theatre	Madi Diaz	3,197 / 3,322	$183,549
April 29	Dublin	Ireland	3Olympia Theatre	Madi Diaz	3,197 / 3,322	$183,549
May 1	Amsterdam	Netherlands	Paradiso	Madi Diaz	3,009 / 3,009	$117,477
May 2	Amsterdam	Netherlands	Paradiso	Madi Diaz	3,009 / 3,009	$117,477
May 3	Brussels	Belgium	Ancienne Belgique	Madi Diaz	1,540 / 1,894	$66,020
May 5	Cologne	Germany	Carlswerk Victoria	Madi Diaz	975 / 1,520	$37,466
May 6	Hamburg	Germany	Docks	Madi Diaz	686 / 1,390	$21,072
May 9	Glasgow	Scotland	O_{2} Academy Glasgow	Madi Diaz	—	—
May 10	Glasgow	Scotland	O_{2} Academy Glasgow	Madi Diaz	—	—
May 11	Manchester	England	O_{2} Apollo Manchester	Madi Diaz	—	—
May 13	Wolverhampton	England	Civic Hall	Madi Diaz	—	—
May 14	London	England	Roundhouse	Madi Diaz	—	—
May 15	London	England	Roundhouse	Madi Diaz	—	—
September 4	State College	United States	Bryce Jordan Center	Father John Misty; Nickel Creek	—	—
September 6	Boston	United States	TD Garden	Father John Misty; Nickel Creek	18,772 / 20,804	$2,167,391
September 7	Boston	United States	TD Garden	Father John Misty; Nickel Creek	18,772 / 20,804	$2,167,391
September 9	Newark	United States	Prudential Center	Father John Misty; Nickel Creek	—	—
September 11	Grand Rapids	United States	Van Andel Arena	Father John Misty; Nickel Creek	—	—
September 12	Rosemont	United States	Allstate Arena	Father John Misty; Nickel Creek	11,730 / 12,302	$1,477,591
September 15	Greenwood Village	United States	Fiddler's Green Amphitheatre	Father John Misty; Nickel Creek	—	—
September 19	Vancouver	Canada	Rogers Arena	Father John Misty; Nickel Creek	—	—
September 20	Seattle	United States	Climate Pledge Arena	Father John Misty; Nickel Creek	12,991 / 12,991	$1,836,202
September 23	Sacramento	United States	Golden 1 Center	Father John Misty; Nickel Creek	—	—
September 24	San Francisco	United States	Chase Center	Father John Misty; Nickel Creek	—	—
September 25	Santa Barbara	United States	Santa Barbara Bowl	—N/a	—	—
September 27	Glendale	United States	Desert Diamond Arena	Father John Misty; Nickel Creek	—	—
September 28	Las Vegas	United States	T-Mobile Arena	Father John Misty; Nickel Creek	10,518 / 14,518	$835,457
October 1	San Diego	United States	Pechanga Arena	Father John Misty; Nickel Creek	—	—
October 3	Inglewood	United States	Kia Forum	Father John Misty; Nickel Creek	—	—
October 4	Inglewood	United States	Kia Forum	Father John Misty; Nickel Creek	—	—
November 6	Laval	Canada	Place Bell	Nickel Creek; Lord Huron	—	—
November 7	Toronto	Canada	Scotiabank Arena	Nickel Creek; Lord Huron	—	—
November 9	Baltimore	United States	CFG Bank Arena	Nickel Creek; Lord Huron	11,492 / 11,492	$1,405,883
November 10	Pittsburgh	United States	PPG Paints Arena	Nickel Creek; Lord Huron	—	—
November 12	Louisville	United States	KFC Yum! Center	Nickel Creek; Lord Huron	—	—
November 13	Columbus	United States	Schottenstein Center	Nickel Creek; Lord Huron	—	—
November 15	Brooklyn	United States	Barclays Center	Nickel Creek; Lord Huron	24,082 / 24,082	$2,861,605
November 16	Brooklyn	United States	Barclays Center	Nickel Creek; Lord Huron	24,082 / 24,082	$2,861,605
November 21	Houston	United States	Toyota Center	Nickel Creek; Lord Huron	—	—
November 22	Dallas	United States	American Airlines Center	Nickel Creek; Lord Huron	—	—
November 23	Dallas	United States	American Airlines Center	Nickel Creek; Lord Huron	—	—
November 26	Austin	United States	Moody Center	Nickel Creek; Lord Huron	20,226 / 20,226	$2,363,298
November 27	Austin	United States	Moody Center	Nickel Creek; Lord Huron	20,226 / 20,226	$2,363,298
November 29	Tampa	United States	Amalie Arena	Nickel Creek; Lord Huron	—	—
November 30	Hollywood	United States	Hard Rock Live	Nickel Creek; Lord Huron	—	—
December 2	Orlando	United States	Kia Center	Nickel Creek; Lord Huron	8,448 / 12,435	$916,276
December 5	Charlotte	United States	Spectrum Center	Nickel Creek; Lord Huron	—	—
December 6	Nashville	United States	Bridgestone Arena	Nickel Creek; Lord Huron	25,915 / 27,312	$3,007,850
December 7	Nashville	United States	Bridgestone Arena	Nickel Creek; Lord Huron	25,915 / 27,312	$3,007,850
Total					153,581 / 167,297 (91.80%)	$17,297,137

== Personnel ==
- Kacey Musgraves - lead vocals, acoustic guitar
- Rob Humphreys - drums
- Tarron Crayton - bass
- John Whitt - keyboards, background vocals
- Darek Cobbs - keyboards, background vocals
- Drew Taubenfeld - guitar, pedal steel, background vocals
- Benjamin Jaffe - guitar, background vocals
- Jon Sosin - guitar, banjo, background vocals
- Sarah Buxton - background vocals
