= Tex Mex Tapes =

Studio album by Kacey Musgraves
- Released: January 15, 2027
- Genres: Country; Tejano
- Languages: English; Spanish
- Label: Lost Highway
- Producers: Ian Fitchuk; Kacey Musgraves; Daniel Tashian

Kacey Musgraves chronology
Middle of Nowhere (2026)	Tex Mex Tapes (2027)

Tex Mex Tapes, also referred to as Middle of Nowhere Vol. 2: Tex Mex Tapes, is the upcoming eighth studio album by American country music singer-songwriter Kacey Musgraves. Set to be released on January 15, 2027, it follows on from, and is a companion album to Musgraves' seventh studio album Middle of Nowhere, and sees her re-team with Ian Fitchuk, and Daniel Tashian to co-produce the project. Tex Mex Tapes continues the exploration of the musical connections between Musgraves' native Texas, and the neighbouring Mexico that began on Middle of Nowhere and more heavily incorporates elements of tejano music alongside Musgraves' trademark neotraditional country sound, and country pop-infused songwriting. The album features sixteen tracks, including four sung in Spanish, and a re-recording of "Uncertain, TX" from Middle of Nowhere.

== Background ==
In April 2025, Musgraves was announced as the first signee to the revived Lost Highway Records, the label she was originally signed to in 2011 before it was folded into Mercury Nashville a year later.

On May 1, 2026, Musgraves released her seventh studio album Middle of Nowhere, her first with the label. Musgraves explained that the album was "written during a period of reflection and post-breakup clarity" and was inspired by her experiences of solitude and self-definition, as well as the concept of "liminal space, both geographical and emotional", including the times she spent between Texas, Tennessee, and Mexico. On the album, Musgraves experimented with several genres linked to her upbringing in Texas, including western swing, bluegrass, and country music from various decades, as well as traditional Mexican music like norteño, mariachi, tejano, and zydeco. Speaking on the decision to incorporate Mexican music elements, Musgraves explained that she had "always been such a fan of norteño and Tejano music", and that her time in Mexico had "naturally" influenced the sound of the album. Musgraves continued to champion Mexican music following the release of Middle of Nowhere by inviting The Mariachi Brothers, a trio of teenage Mexican musicians who had previously been detained by ICE, to open her three shows at Gruene Hall celebrating the album's release.

On October 6, 2026, Musgraves released a cumbia-inspired Spanish language version of Middle of Nowhere track "Uncertain, TX" with American musica mexicana band Intocable. The English version of the song featured American country music singer-songwriter Willie Nelson. It is Musgraves' first original Spanish song, though a cover of "Gracias a la vida" previously appeared on her seventh studio album Star-Crossed (2021), and she featured on the English/Spanish duet "Lost in Translation" with Mexican musician Carín León in 2025. Speaking on the re-release of "Uncertain, TX", Musgraves explained, "having a song with the legends of Intocable is such a thrill for me. As a Texan, I am proud of the cultural melting pot that makes our state so great, and this collaboration is such a fun example of that."

The album, Tex Mex Tapes was officially announced on October 22, 2026, alongside the release of two tracks, "Weekend in Texas" and a cover of the traditional norteño song "Mi Tesoro". Describing the project, Musgraves stated that it would continue to explore the topics from Middle of Nowhere and would "expand on themes of solitude, contentment, and finding beauty in the in-between. In addition to "Mis Tesoro", the album also includes covers of "(Hey Baby) Que Paso" by the Texas Tornados, which appeared on their 1990 self-titled debut album, "Tú, sólo tú, a ranchera song most notably recorded by Linda Ronstadt, and Selena, and "Before the Next Teardrop Falls" by Freddy Fender, plus "All My Exes (Kacey's Version)", a rewritten take on George Strait's "All My Ex's Live in Texas" that Musgraves performed at the 2026 Coachella festival.

== Track listing ==
No.	Title	Writer(s)	Length
1.	"Pretty Horses"		2:50
2.	"Weekend in Texas"	Ilsey Juber; Shane McAnally; Musgraves	2:53
3.	"Hard Conversations"		3:54
4.	"Denim on Denim"		3:04
5.	"Figure Out My Life"		4:35
6.	"Caballero"		1:40
7.	"The Vacation Song"	Musgraves; Julian Bunetta; Steph Jones	3:27
8.	"(Hey Baby) Qué Pasó?"	Augie Meyers; Bill Sheffield	2:59
9.	"Uncertain, TX" (featuring Intocable)	Musgraves; Daniel Tashian	3:33
10.	"Mi Tesoro"	Pedro Reyna Cisneros	3:15
11.	"Rodeo"		4:15
12.	"Tú, sólo tú" (featuring Mariachi Oro de América)	Felipe Valdés Leal	4:29
13.	"All My Exes (Kacey's Version)"		3:00
14.	"Desert Eyes"		2:45
15.	"Pity Party"		3:06
16.	"Before the Next Teardrop Falls"	Vivian Keith; Ben Peters	2:46

== Release history ==
Release date and formats
Region	Date	Format	Label	Ref.
Various	January 15, 2027	CD; digital download; streaming; vinyl	Lost Highway	
