= William Beckmann =

Background information
- Born: William Beckmann Hyslop; 22 June 1995 (age 31); Del Rio, Texas
- Genre: Country
- Occupations: Singer-songwriter; musician
- Instruments: Vocals; guitar; harmonica; piano
- Years active: 2017–present
- Label: Warner Music Nashville MCA Nashville
- Website: www.williambeckmann.com

William Beckmann (born 22 June 1995) is an American country music singer-songwriter and musician from Del Rio, Texas. Having gained popularity touring in the regional Texas music scene and self-releasing three extended plays, Beckmann signed with Warner Music Nashville and subsequently released his major label debut, Whiskey Lies & Alibis, on June 20, 2025. His music is a fusion of neotraditional country, with influences of red dirt, tejano, New Mexico music, and traditional pop, with critics noting his signature crooner-style baritone voice. Beckmann has toured with Parker McCollum, Randy Rogers Band, Charley Crockett, Radney Foster, Flatland Cavalry, Midland, Hank Williams Jr., George Strait, and Kacey Musgraves.

== Early life ==
Beckmann was born in Del Rio, Texas, a town on the border between Texas and Mexico and spent time on both sides of the border while growing up on his parents' cattle ranch. His grandparents are from Chihuahua, Mexico, and he is bilingual, speaking and singing in both English and Spanish. He described himself as being raised on classic country music as well as the mariachi and Norteño sounds of northern Mexico. Beckmann learned to play piano, guitar, and harmonica as a child and performed in a classic rock cover band as a teenager.

== Influences ==
As a result of his Mexican-American heritage, Beckmann has stated that he always aims to include at least two Spanish language songs in his setlist, explaining that “people that have never heard [Spanish songs] before think it’s really cool and unique, and the people that are Hispanic feel like their culture and their people are getting represented. Showing that side of the Texas culture and the Mexican American heritage that there’s so much out in Texas is really important.” He describes some of his primary musical influences as George Strait, George Jones, Roy Orbison, Johnny Cash, Waylon Jennings, Elvis Presley, Frank Sinatra, Randy Rogers, and Vicente Fernández.

== Career ==
Beckmann relocated to Nashville, Tennessee and released his debut extended play, Outskirts of Town, on November 21, 2018, which led to him signing a publishing deal with Warner Chappell Music the following year in December 2019.

On April 29, 2022, Beckmann self-released Faded Memories, his second EP which featured a cover of Bruce Springsteen's "I'm on Fire". It was preceded by the lead single "Follow", and includes the singles "In the Dark", and "Bourbon Whiskey" which would go on to become one of his signature songs.

Beckmann made his Grand Ole Opry debut on March 3, 2023, performing his own song "Bourbon Whiskey" and a cover of "Volver, Volver" by Vicente Fernández, the latter of which went viral and earned over 3.5 million views on the Opry's YouTube channel. He followed this with his third EP, Here's To You. Here's To Me., a self-described heartbreak and breakup album. Of the project's content, Beckmann stated "I've always been a big fan of sad boy songs. I don't think I intentionally made it that way. But the songs that I was the most excited about happened to be in that vein… I wouldn't consider myself in that spot right now in my life, it's just the songs kind of came together and in that way. But, you know, heartbreak, it's always going to be a relevant thing."

On August 27 2024, Beckmann was signed to Warner Music Nashville. Beckman commented on this saying that: “I’m incredibly grateful for this opportunity to be a part of the Warner family. From the very beginning they’ve had such a holistic understanding of both my journey to this point and vision for the future, I can’t wait to begin releasing music together”. In a statement, Warner Music A&R representative Stephanie Phillips said “William has a swagger that is both retro and youthful. Combine that with his rich, timeless vocal and the result is a modern-vintage sound that is quite unique not just to the country format, but to all genres of music. Whether he is serenading in English or in Spanish, you immediately recognize that William Beckmann is in the one of one category of artists.”

On April 25, 2025, Beckmann announced his major label debut album, Whiskey Lies & Alibis which was set for release on June 20. Produced by Jon Randall, the project was described as a layered country album that captures the sting of lost love and the clarity that follows. In a statement to accompany the announcement, Beckmann said “For me, an album is meant to be a photo album. It’s meant to capture a moment in time, and it’s supposed to last forever. That’s what I think we were able to do with this record. I’m confident that if I ever get to be an old man, I’ll look back on this and be like, ‘Yeah, we did it right.’” He co-wrote eight of the twelve tracks. The album was preceded by the singles "Not That Strong", "Borderline Crazy", "Starting Over Again", "Honky Tonk Blue", and "Game I Like to Play". "Borderline Crazy" was Beckmann's first number one single, topping the Texas Country Music Chart for three weeks in March 2025.

== Discography ==
=== Studio albums ===
List of albums, with selected details
Title	Album details
Whiskey Lies & Alibis	Release date: June 20, 2025; Label: Warner Music Nashville; Format: CD, digital download, LP, streaming

=== Extended plays ===
List of albums, with selected details
Title	Album details
Outskirts of Town	Release date: November 21, 2018; Label: Highway 90; Format: CD, digital download, streaming
Faded Memories	Release date: April 29, 2022; Label: Highway 90; Format: CD, digital download, streaming
Here's To You. Here's To Me.	Release date: August 4, 2023; Label: Highway 90; Format: CD, digital download, streaming
Live from Cheatham Street	Release date: October 6, 2023; Label: Highway 90; Format: Streaming, digital download

=== Singles ===
List of singles
Date	Title	Album
2020	"Someday"	Non-album single
2021	"Bourbon Whiskey"	Faded Memories
2021	"In the Dark"	Faded Memories
2021	"I'm on Fire"	Faded Memories
2022	"Follow"	Faded Memories
2022	"Danced All Night Long"	Faded Memories
2023	"Blue Christmas"	Non-album single
2024	"Not That Strong"	Whiskey Lies & Alibis
2024	"Borderline Crazy"	Whiskey Lies & Alibis
2024	"White Christmas" / "Ven a Mi Casa Esta Navidad"	Non-album singles
2025	"Starting Over Again"	Whiskey Lies & Alibis
2025	"Honky Tonk Blue"	Whiskey Lies & Alibis
2025	"Game I Like to Play"	Whiskey Lies & Alibis
2025	"Lonely Over You"	Whiskey Lies & Alibis
