= Ian Fitchuk =

American songwriter and record producer

- Born: February 13, 1982 (age 44); Chicago
- Occupations: songwriter and record producer

Ian Fitchuk (born February 13, 1982) is an American songwriter and record producer.

== Early life ==
Fitchuk was born in Chicago to parents who are both accomplished classical musicians and educators. He grew up there. He cites Paul Simon's Graceland as being a significant musical influence from an early age. He moved to Nashville in 2000 to study jazz piano at Belmont University. He was quickly recruited to play keyboard by local band Llama, who was on MCA Records at the time. After leaving the band, he began producing artists such as Amy Grant, Mindy Smith, Landon Pigg, Jeremy Lister, and Griffin House with production partner Justin Loucks.

== Discography ==
Songwriting and Production Credits
Year	Title	Artist(s)	Album	Credits
2026	"Tomorrow"	Mark Ambor	East Houston Tapes - EP	Co-Producer
2026	"The Vacation Song"	Kacey Musgraves	Middle of Nowhere Vol. 2: Tex Mex Tapes	Co-Producer
2026	"Ruthless (Arena Mix)"	Kacey Musgraves, The Hunger Games	The Hunger Games: Sunrise on the Reaping - The Album	Co-Producer/Co-Writer
2026	"Jester in the Bowl"	Mon Rovia	Jester in the Bowl - Single	Co-Producer
2026	"version of me"	Ethan Regan	YOUNG REGAN (DELUXE)	Co-Producer/Co-Writer
2026	"midnight with a stranger"	Ethan Regan	YOUNG REGAN (DELUXE)	Co-Producer
2026	"Uncertain, TX (feat. Intocable) [Spanish Version]"	Kacey Musgraves, Intocable	Uncertain, TX (feat. Intocable) [Spanish Version] - Single	Co-Producer
2026	"It Is What It Is"	Stephen Day	Stephen Day	Co-Producer
2026	"Rock Bottom Baby"	Stephen Day	Stephen Day	Co-Producer/Co-Writer
2026	"Annie Breakdown"	Stephen Day	Stephen Day	Co-Producer/Co-Writer
2026	"Yes I Do"	Stephen Day	Stephen Day	Co-Producer
2026	"Back In My Bed"	Stephen Day	Stephen Day	Co-Producer
2026	"Cry Baby"	Stephen Day	Stephen Day	Co-Producer
2026	"Heartbreak Is Up Ahead"	Stephen Day	Stephen Day	Co-Producer
2026	"You Wouldn't Know"	Stephen Day	Stephen Day	Co-Producer
2026	"Don't Leave Me Like This"	Stephen Day	Stephen Day	Co-Producer
2026	"Mama, I Found Your Guitar"	Stephen Day	Stephen Day	Co-Producer
2026	"Leanin' On My Truck"	Stephen Day	Stephen Day	Co-Producer
2026	"Supernova"	Stephen Day	Stephen Day	Co-Producer/Co-Writer
2026	"Picture's Perfect"	Stephen Day	Stephen Day	Co-Producer/Co-Writer
2026	"Good To Be Alive"	Frank Mastra	Bitter End	Produer/Co-Writer
2026	"Man I'll Never Be"	Frank Mastra	Bitter End	Producer
2026	"Show Me How"	Frank Mastra	Bitter End	Producer/Co-Writer
2026	"This Heart Of Mine"	Frank Mastra	Bitter End	Producer/Co-Writer
2026	"Was It Love"	Frank Mastra	Bitter End	Producer/Co-Writer
2026	"How We've Grown"	Frank Mastra	Bitter End	Producer
2026	"Beyond The Blue"	Frank Mastra	Bitter End	Produer/Co-Writer
2026	"What We Were Fighting For"	Waylon Wyatt	Dustpiles	Producer
2026	"In Loving Melody"	Waylon Wyatt	Dustpiles	Producer
2026	"Clothesline"	Dylan Gossett	Clothesline - Single	Co-Producer
2026	"Honeysuckle"	Dylan Gossett	Honeysuckle - Single	Additional Production
2026	"Mary Janes"	Maisie Peters	Florescence	Co-Producer
2026	"Audrey Hepburn"	Maisie Peters	Florescence	Co-Producer
2026	"Say My Name In Your Sleep"	Maisie Peters	Florescence	Co-Producer
2026	"Old Fashioned"	Maisie Peters	Florescence	Co-Producer
2026	"Houses"	Maisie Peters	Florescence	Co-Producer
2026	"Kingmaker (with Julia Michaels)"	Maisie Peters	Florescence	Additional Production
2026	"Vampire Time"	Maisie Peters	Florescence	Co-Producer
2026	"My Regards"	Maisie Peters	Florescence	Co-Producer
2026	"You You You"	Maisie Peters	Florescence	Co-Producer
2026	"If You Let Me (with Marcus Mumford)"	Maisie Peters	Florescence	Co-Producer
2026	"Flat Earther"	Maisie Peters	Florescence	Co-Producer
2026	"Questions"	Maisie Peters	Florescence	Co-Producer
2026	"Girl's Just Flying"	Maisie Peters	Florescence	Co-Producer
2026	"You Then Me Now"	Maisie Peters	Florescence	Co-Producer
2026	"Nothing Like Being In Love"	Maisie Peters	Florescence	Co-Producer
2026	"Middle of Nowhere"	Kacey Musgraves	Middle of Nowhere	Co-Producer/Co-Writer
2026	"Dry Spell"	Kacey Musgraves	Middle of Nowhere	Co-Producer
2026	"Back On The Wagon"	Kacey Musgraves	Middle of Nowhere	Co-Producer/Co-Writer
2026	"I Believe In Ghosts"	Kacey Musgraves	Middle of Nowhere	Co-Producer
2026	"Abilene"	Kacey Musgraves	Middle of Nowhere	Co-Producer
2026	"Coyote (feat. Gregory Alan Isakov)"	Kacey Musgraves	Middle of Nowhere	Co-Producer/Co-Writer
2026	"Loneliest Girl"	Kacey Musgraves	Middle of Nowhere	Co-Producer
2026	"Everybody Wants To Be A Cowboy (feat. Billy Strings)"	Kacey Musgraves	Middle of Nowhere	Co-Producer/Co-Writer
2026	"Uncertain, TX (feat. Willie Nelson)"	Kacey Musgraves	Middle of Nowhere	Co-Producer
2026	"Rhinestoned"	Kacey Musgraves	Middle of Nowhere	Co-Producer/Co-Writer
2026	"Mexico Honey"	Kacey Musgraves	Middle of Nowhere	Co-Producer
2026	"Hell On Me"	Kacey Musgraves	Middle of Nowhere	Co-Producer
2026	"Falling For The Devil"	Marcus King	Darling Blue / No Room For Blue	Co-Writer
2026	"My Boy"	Dylan Gossett	My Boy - Single	Producer
2026	"You Lead Me"	Lauren Daigle	You Lead Me - Single	Producer
2026	"Flowers in Bloom"	Tom Misch	Full Circle	Co-Producer
2026	"Slow Tonight"	Tom Misch	Full Circle	Co-Producer
2026	"Goldie"	Tom Misch	Full Circle	Co-Writer
2026	"To Love Somebody"	Holly Humberstone	Cruel World	Drums
2025	"If The World Burns Down"	Kacey Musgraves	Nobody Wants This Season 2: The Soundtrack	Co-Producer/Co-Writer
2025	"Matches and Gasoline"	Noah Rinker	The Pines EP	Co-Producer
2025	"Tumbleweed"	Noah Rinker	The Pines EP	Co-Producer/Co-Writer
2025	"Don't Give Up On Me"	Noah Rinker	The Pines EP	Co-Producer/Co-Writer
2025	"Say My Name in Your Sleep"	Maisie Peters	Florescence	Co-Producer
2025	"You You You"	Maisie Peters	Florescence	Co-Producer
2025	"Audrey Hepburn"	Maisie Peters	Florescence	Co-Producer
2025	"Pretty Little Liar"	Waylon Wyatt	Pretty Little Liar - Single	Producer
2025	"Who Knows"	Mark Ambor	Who Knows - Single	Co-Producer
2025	"Northern Lights"	Teddy Swims	I've Tried Everything But Therapy (Part 2)	Co-Producer
2025	"Old Man"	Tom Misch	Old Man - Single	Co-Producer
2025	"Red Moon"	Tom Misch	Red Moon - Single	Co-Producer/Co-Writer
2024	"When a Man Cries"	Leon Bridges	Leon	Co-Writer/Producer
2024	"That's What I Love"	Leon Bridges	Leon	Co-Writer/Co-Producer
2024	"Laredo"	Leon Bridges	Leon	Co-Writer/Producer
2024	"Panther City"	Leon Bridges	Leon	Co-Writer/Co-Producer
2024	"Ain't Got Nothing On You"	Leon Bridges	Leon	Producer
2024	"Simplify"	Leon Bridges	Leon	Producer
2024	"Teddy's Tune"	Leon Bridges	Leon	Producer
2024	"Never Satisfied"	Leon Bridges	Leon	Co-Writer/Co-Producer
2024	"Peaceful Place"	Leon Bridges	Leon	Co-Writer/Co-Producer
2024	"Can't Have It All"	Leon Bridges	Leon	Producer
2024	"Ivy"	Leon Bridges	Leon	Co-Producer
2024	"Ghetto Honeybee"	Leon Bridges	Leon	Co-Writer/Co-Producer
2024	"God Loves Everyone"	Leon Bridges	Leon	Co-Writer/Co-Producer
2024	"Burning"	Jelly Roll	Beautifully Broken	Co-Writer
2024	"Grace"	Jelly Roll	Beautifully Broken	Co-Writer
2024	"Dumb Bitch Juice"	Rachel Chinouriri	What a Devastating Turn of Events	Co-Writer
2024	"Under These Conditions"	Clover County	Porch Lights EP	Co-Producer
2024	"Silver Bells"	Stephen Sanchez	Silver Bells - Single	Co-Producer
2024	"Ruthless"	Kacey Musgraves	Deeper Well: Deeper into the Well	Co-Writer/Co-Producer
2024	"Little Sister"	Kacey Musgraves	Deeper Well: Deeper into the Well	Co-Writer/Co-Producer
2024	"Flower Child"	Kacey Musgraves	Deeper Well: Deeper into the Well	Co-Writer/Co-Producer
2024	"Superbloom (feat. Leon Bridges)"	Kacey Musgraves	Deeper Well: Deeper into the Well	Co-Writer/Co-Producer
2024	"Perfection (feat. Tiny Habits)"	Kacey Musgraves	Deeper Well: Deeper into the Well	Co-Writer/Co-Producer
2024	"Arm's Length"	Kacey Musgraves	Deeper Well: Deeper into the Well	Co-Producer
2024	"Irish Goodbye"	Kacey Musgraves	Deeper Well: Deeper into the Well	Co-Writer/Co-Producer
2024	"In The Living Room"	Maggie Rogers	In The Living Room - Single	Co-Writer/Co-Producer
2024	"Rid Of Me"	Still Woozy	Loveseat	Co-Writer
2024	"Lemon"	Still Woozy	Loveseat	Co-Writer
2024	"Howling at Wolves"	Stephen Sanchez	Angel Face (Deluxe)	Co-Producer
2024	"The Other Side"	Stephen Sanchez	Angel Face (Deluxe)	Co-Producer
2024	"Emotional Vacation"	Stephen Sanchez	Angel Face (Deluxe)	Co-Writer/Co-Producer
2024	"Fame of Fortune"	Stephen Sanchez	Angel Face (Deluxe)	Co-Producer
2024	"This Thing Called Love"	Stephen Sanchez	Angel Face (Deluxe)	Co-Writer/Co-Producer
2024	"Until I Found You (With Em Beihold)"	Stephen Sanchez	Angel Face (Deluxe)	Co-Producer
2024	"If I Had A Lover"	Dylan Gossett	Songs in the Gravel EP	Producer
2024	"hurt like it should"	Renforshort	clean hands dirty water EP	Co-Writer/Co-Producer
2024	"Oh Gemini"	Role Model (singer)	Oh, Gemini – single	Producer/Co-Writer
2024	"AMEN"	Beyoncé	Cowboy Carter	Co-Producer/Co-Writer
2024	"It Was Coming All Along"	Maggie Rogers	Don't Forget Me	Producer/Co-Writer
2024	"Drunk"	Maggie Rogers	Don't Forget Me	Producer/Co-Writer
2024	"So Sick Of Dreaming"	Maggie Rogers	Don't Forget Me	Producer/Co-Writer
2024	"The Kill"	Maggie Rogers	Don't Forget Me	Producer/Co-Writer
2024	"If Now Was Then"	Maggie Rogers	Don't Forget Me	Producer/Co-Writer
2024	"I Still Do"	Maggie Rogers	Don't Forget Me	Producer/Co-Writer
2024	"On & On & On"	Maggie Rogers	Don't Forget Me	Producer/Co-Writer
2024	"Never Going Home"	Maggie Rogers	Don't Forget Me	Producer/Co-Writer
2024	"All The Same"	Maggie Rogers	Don't Forget Me	Producer/Co-Writer
2024	"Don't Forget Me"	Maggie Rogers	Don't Forget Me	Producer/Co-Writer
2024	"Redemption Song"	Leon Bridges	Bob Marley: One Love – Music Inspired by the Film	Producer
2024	"Three Little Birds"	Kacey Musgraves	Bob Marley: One Love – Music Inspired by the Film	Producer
2024	"Cardinal"	Kacey Musgraves	Deeper Well	
2024	"Deeper Well"	Kacey Musgraves	Deeper Well	Co-Producer/Co-Writer
2024	"Too Good To Be True"	Kacey Musgraves	Deeper Well	Co-Producer/Co-Writer
2024	"Moving Out"	Kacey Musgraves	Deeper Well	Co-Producer/Co-Writer
2024	"Giver/Taker"	Kacey Musgraves	Deeper Well	Co-Producer/Co-Writer
2024	"Sway"	Kacey Musgraves	Deeper Well	Co-Producer/Co-Writer
2024	"Dinner with Friends"	Kacey Musgraves	Deeper Well	Co-Producer/Co-Writer
2024	"Heart of the Woods"	Kacey Musgraves	Deeper Well	Co-Producer/Co-Writer
2024	"Jade Green"	Kacey Musgraves	Deeper Well	Co-Producer/Co-Writer
2024	"The Architect"	Kacey Musgraves	Deeper Well	Co-Producer
2024	"Lonely Millionaire"	Kacey Musgraves	Deeper Well	Co-Producer/Co-Writer
2024	"Heaven Is"	Kacey Musgraves	Deeper Well	Co-Producer/Co-Writer
2024	"Anime Eyes"	Kacey Musgraves	Deeper Well	Co-Producer/Co-Writer
2024	"Nothing to be Scared Of"	Kacey Musgraves	Deeper Well	Co-Producer/Co-Writer
2024	"I Don't Wanna Worry"	Needtobreathe	I Don't Wanna Worry – single	Co-Writer
2023	"This Time"	Deyaz	TRANSPARENCY	Producer
2023	"Something About Her"	Stephen Sanchez	Angel Face	Producer/Co-Writer
2023	"I Need You Most Of All"	Stephen Sanchez	Angel Face	Producer/Co-Writer
2023	"Only Girl"	Stephen Sanchez	Angel Face	Producer/Co-Writer
2023	"Be More"	Stephen Sanchez	Angel Face	Producer/Co-Writer
2023	"Until I Found You"	Stephen Sanchez	Angel Face	Producer
2023	"Shake"	Stephen Sanchez	Angel Face	Producer/Co-Writer
2023	"High"	Stephen Sanchez	Angel Face	Producer
2023	"Doesn't Do Me Any Good"	Stephen Sanchez	Angel Face	Producer/Co-Writer
2023	"Caught In A Blue"	Stephen Sanchez	Angel Face	Producer/Co-Writer
2023	"Death Of The Troubadour"	Stephen Sanchez	Angel Face	Producer/Co-Writer
2023	"Send My Heart With A Kiss"	Stephen Sanchez	Angel Face	Producer/Co-Writer
2023	"I Hate Boston"	Reneé Rapp	Snow Angel	Co-Writer
2023	"fetish"	Spill Tab	Klepto – EP	Producer/Co-Writer
2023	"Ghost"	Sigrid	Ghost – single	Producer/Co-Writer
2023	"Si Me Voy (with The Marias)"	Cuco	Si Me Voy (with The Marias) – single	Producer
2023	"Revolution (with Maxo Kream)"	Joy Oladokun	Proof of Life	Co-Writer
2023	"We're All Gonna Die (with Noah Kahan)"	Joy Oladokun	Proof of Life	Producer/Co-Writer
2023	"Spotlight"	Joy Oladokun	Proof of Life	Producer/Co-Writer
2023	"Horizons"	Gus Dapperton	FEVER / SKY	Producer/Co-Writer
2023	"Homebody"	Gus Dapperton	FEVER / SKY	Producer/Co-Writer
2023	"Phases"	Gus Dapperton	FEVER / SKY	Producer/Co-Writer
2023	"Sunrise (feat. Ocean Vuong)"	Gus Dapperton	FEVER / SKY	Producer/Co-Writer
2023	Midnight Train	Gus Dapperton	FEVER / SKY	Producer/Co-Writer
2023	"Be Yourself"	Wilder Woods	FEVER / SKY	Co-Writer
2023	"Out Of My Mind"	Trousdale	Out Of My Mind	Co-Writer
2022	"I Can't Help Falling In Love"	Kacey Musgraves	From The Original Motion Picture ELVIS	Co-Producer
2022	"Way That I'm Going"	Vance Joy	In Our Own Sweet Time	Co-Writer
2022	"Time is a Healer"	Jessie Baylin	Time is a Healer	Producer/Co-Writer
2022	"Sitting in the Corner (feat. Adriel Favela & Kacey Musgraves)"	Cuco	Fantasy Gateway	Producer/Co-Writer
2022	"Me and the Moon"	Devon Gilfillian	SPELLJAMS	Co-Writer
2022	"Sweet Symphony (with Chris Stapleton)"	Joy Oladokun	Sweet Symphony – Single	Producer/Co-Writer
2022	"Keeping the Light On"	Joy Oladokun	Keeping the Light On – Single	Producer/Co-Writer
2022	"Irrelevant"	P!NK	Irrelevant – Single	Producer/Co-Writer
2022	"If I Died Last Night"	Jessie Murph	If I Died Last Night – EP	Producer/Co-Writer
2022	"Touch and Go"	Adam Melchor	Here Goes Nothing!	Co-Writer
2022	"Cry"	Adam Melchor	Here Goes Nothing!	Co-Writer
2022	"Wishing Well"	Karen Elson	Green	Producer/Co-Writer
2022	"Silver Lining"	Karen Elson	Green	Producer/Co-Writer
2022	"My Sparrow"	Karen Elson	Green	Producer/Co-Writer
2022	"Modern Love"	Karen Elson	Green	Producer/Co-Writer
2022	"Look Over My Shoulder"	Karen Elson	Green	Producer/Co-Writer
2022	"Lightning Strikes"	Karen Elson	Green	Producer/Co-Writer
2022	"Green"	Karen Elson	Green	Producer/Co-Writer
2022	"Fergus in the Sun"	Karen Elson	Green	Producer/Co-Writer
2022	"Broken Shadow"	Karen Elson	Green	Producer/Co-Writer
2022	"Steady Love"	Ben Rector	The Joy of Music	Co-Writer
2021	"roses in the rain (lullaby)"	Christina Perri	songs for rosie	Co-Writer
2021	"Hold Her While You Can"	Stephen Sanchez	What Was, Not Now – EP	Producer
2021	"Love Life"	Stephen Sanchez	What Was, Not Now – EP	Producer
2021	"Kayla"	Stephen Sanchez	What Was, Not Now – EP	Producer
2021	"The Pool"	Stephen Sanchez	What Was, Not Now – EP	Producer
2021	"I Want You"	Stephen Sanchez	What Was, Not Now – EP	Producer
2021	"Until We Meet Again"	Stephen Sanchez	What Was, Not Now – EP	Producer
2021	"If I Was a Cowboy"	Miranda Lambert	If I Was a Cowboy – Single	Bass/Keys
2021	"star-crossed"	Kacey Musgraves	star-crossed	Producer/Co-Writer
2021	"good wife"	Kacey Musgraves	star-crossed	Producer/Co-Writer
2021	"cherry blossom"	Kacey Musgraves	star-crossed	Producer/Co-Writer
2021	"simple times"	Kacey Musgraves	star-crossed	Producer/Co-Writer
2021	"if this was a movie"	Kacey Musgraves	star-crossed	Producer/Co-Writer
2021	"justified"	Kacey Musgraves	star-crossed	Producer/Co-Writer
2021	"angel"	Kacey Musgraves	star-crossed	Producer/Co-Writer
2021	"breadwinner"	Kacey Musgraves	star-crossed	Producer/Co-Writer
2021	"camera roll"	Kacey Musgraves	star-crossed	Producer/Co-Writer
2021	"easier said"	Kacey Musgraves	star-crossed	Producer/Co-Writer
2021	"hookup scene"	Kacey Musgraves	star-crossed	Producer/Co-Writer
2021	"keep lookin' up"	Kacey Musgraves	star-crossed	Producer/Co-Writer
2021	"what doesn't kill me"	Kacey Musgraves	star-crossed	Producer
2021	"there is a light"	Kacey Musgraves	star-crossed	Producer/Co-Writer
2021	"gracias a la vida"	Kacey Musgraves	star-crossed	Producer
2021	"Silk Chiffon" (feat. Phoebe Bridgers)	MUNA	Muna	Co-Writer
2021	"Sho Nuff"	Leon Bridges	Gold-Diggers Sound	Co-Writer
2021	"Until I Found You"	Stephen Sanchez	Until I Found You – Single	Producer
2021	"Kayla"	Stephen Sanchez	Kayla – Single	Producer
2021	"The Witching Hour – Intro"	Birdy	Young Heart	Producer
2021	"Voyager"	Birdy	Young Heart	Producer/Co-Writer
2021	"The Otherside"	Birdy	Young Heart	Producer/Co-Writer
2021	"Surrender"	Birdy	Young Heart	Co-Writer
2021	"River Song"	Birdy	Young Heart	Producer/Co-Writer
2021	"Lighthouse"	Birdy	Young Heart	Producer
2021	"Evergreen"	Birdy	Young Heart	Producer
2021	"Little Blue"	Birdy	Young Heart	Producer
2021	"Celestial Dancers"	Birdy	Young Heart	Producer
2021	"New Moon"	Birdy	Young Heart	Producer/Co-Writer
2021	"Young Heart"	Birdy	Young Heart	Producer
2021	"Feel the Feels"	The Atlantic High Five	Feel the Feels – Single	Co-Writer
2021	"Lightning Strikes"	Karen Elson	Lightning Strikes – Single	Producer/Co-Writer
2020	"Nightfall"	Little Big Town	Nightfall	Producer/Co-Writer
2020	"River of Stars"	Little Big Town	Nightfall	Producer/Co-Writer
2020	"Bluebird"	Little Big Town	Nightfall	Producer/Co-Writer
2020	"Lighten Up"	Brothers Osborne	Skeletons	Co-Writer
2020	"Oh, What A World 2.0 (Earth Day Edition)"	Kacey Musgraves	Oh, What A World 2.0 (Earth Day Edition) – Single	Producer/Co-Writer
2020	"California King"	Emily Reid	California King – Single	Co-Writer
2020	"Where the Heart Is"	Brett Eldredge	Sunday Drive	Producer
2020	"The One You Need"	Brett Eldredge	Sunday Drive	Producer
2020	"Magnolia"	Brett Eldredge	Sunday Drive	Producer
2020	"Crowd My Mind"	Brett Eldredge	Sunday Drive	Producer
2020	"Good Day"	Brett Eldredge	Sunday Drive	Producer/Co-Writer
2020	"Fall For Me"	Brett Eldredge	Sunday Drive	Producer
2020	"Sunday Drive"	Brett Eldredge	Sunday Drive	Producer
2020	"When I Die"	Brett Eldredge	Sunday Drive	Producer/Co-Writer
2020	"Gabrielle"	Brett Eldredge	Sunday Drive	Producer/Co-Writer
2020	"Fix A Heart"	Brett Eldredge	Sunday Drive	Producer
2020	"Then You Do"	Brett Eldredge	Sunday Drive	Producer
2020	"Paris Illinois"	Brett Eldredge	Sunday Drive	Producer/Co-Writer
2020	"Believe"	Karen Elson	Radio Redhead, Vol. 1	Producer
2020	"Lay All Your Love on Me"	Karen Elson	Radio Redhead, Vol. 1	Producer
2020	"Sacrifice"	Karen Elson	Radio Redhead, Vol. 1	Producer
2020	"Dancing on My Own"	Karen Elson	Radio Redhead, Vol. 1	Producer
2020	We'll Meet Again"	Karen Elson	Radio Redhead, Vol. 1	Producer
2020	"Hang On"	Needtobreathe	Out of Body	Co-Writer
2020	"Relief"	Jacob Whitesides	Winter Hurts – EP	Co-Writer
2020	"Changing"	Jacob Whitesides	Winter Hurts – EP	Co-Writer
2020	"Lonely Together"	Caitlyn Smith	Supernova	Co-Writer
2020	"asking for a friend"	mxmtoon	dawn & dusk	Producer/Co-Writer
2020	"Daydreams"	Maisie Peters	Daydreams – Single	Producer/Co-Writer
2020	"good guys"	LANY	mama's boy	Co-Writer
2020	"My Own Way"	Jill Andrews	Thirties	Co-Writer
2020	"Falling For"	Jill Andrews	Thirties	Co-Writer
2020	"The Quarry Song"	Jordan Lehning	Little Idols	Co-Writer
2020	"Fields of Knowing"	Skyline Motel	After Dark – EP	Co-Writer
2020	"Danger"	Skyline Motel	After Dark – EP	Co-Writer
2020	"One Night"	Skyline Motel	After Dark – EP	Co-Writer
2020	"Kiss and Tell"	Skyline Motel	After Dark – EP	Co-Writer
2020	"Do You Want Me"	Skyline Motel	After Dark – EP	Co-Writer
2020	"If You Got A Problem"	Joy Oladokun	If You Got A Problem – Single	Producer/Co-Writer
2019	"Self Care"	Lily & Madeleine	Canterbury Girls	Producer
2019	"Supernatural Sadness"	Lily & Madeleine	Canterbury Girls	Producer/Co-Writer
2019	"Just Do It"	Lily & Madeleine	Canterbury Girls	Producer
2019	"Canterbury Girls"	Lily & Madeleine	Canterbury Girls	Producer
2019	"Bruises"	Lily & Madeleine	Canterbury Girls	Producer
2019	"Pachinko Song"	Lily & Madeleine	Canterbury Girls	Producer
2019	"Circles"	Lily & Madeleine	Canterbury Girls	Producer
2019	"Can't Help the Way I Feel"	Lily & Madeleine	Canterbury Girls	Producer
2019	"Analog Love"	Lily & Madeleine	Canterbury Girls	Producer
2019	"Go"	Lily & Madeleine	Canterbury Girls	Producer
2019	"Homeboy"	Susto	Ever Since I Lost My Mind	Producer
2019	"If I Was"	Susto	Ever Since I Lost My Mind	Producer
2019	"Weather Balloons"	Susto	Ever Since I Lost My Mind	Producer
2019	"Manual Transmission"	Susto	Ever Since I Lost My Mind	Producer
2019	"Last Century"	Susto	Ever Since I Lost My Mind	Producer
2019	"Está Bien"	Susto	Ever Since I Lost My Mind	Producer
2019	"House Of The Blue Green Buddha"	Susto	Ever Since I Lost My Mind	Producer/Co-Writer
2019	"Livin' in America"	Susto	Ever Since I Lost My Mind	Producer
2019	"Ever Since I Lost My Mind"	Susto	Ever Since I Lost My Mind	Producer
2019	"Cocaine"	Susto	Ever Since I Lost My Mind	Producer
2019	"No Way Out"	Susto	Ever Since I Lost My Mind	Producer
2019	"Off You"	Susto	Ever Since I Lost My Mind	Producer
2019	"Lights Up"	Harry Styles	Fine Line	Drums
2019	"All Is Found – Kacey Musgraves Version"	Kacey Musgraves	Frozen II (Original Motion Picture Soundtrack)	Producer
2019	"Good Woman"	Maren Morris	Girl	Co-Writer
2019	"Here We Go"	Sean McConnell	Secondhand Smoke	Co-Writer
2019	"Nobody Smokes Anymore"	Robert Ellis	Texas Piano Man	Co-Writer
2019	"Castles"	Lissie	When I'm Alone: The Piano Retrospective	Co-Writer
2019	"Best Days"	Lissie	When I'm Alone: The Piano Retrospective	Co-Writer
2019	"Stand and Deliver"	Patrick Droney	Patrick Droney	Producer
2019	"Brooklyn"	Patrick Droney	Patrick Droney	Producer
2019	"Ruined"	Patrick Droney	Patrick Droney	Producer/Co-writer
2019	"Always Been the End of the World"	Patrick Droney	Patrick Droney	Producer
2019	"High Hope"	Patrick Droney	Patrick Droney	Producer
2019	"Montgomery"	Muscadine Bloodline	Montgomery – Single	Co-Writer
2019	"Only the Truth"	Sarah Buxton	Only the Truth – Single	Producer/Co-writer
2019	"Do You Want Me"	Skyline Motel	Do You Want Me – Single	Co-Writer
2019	"Evelyn"	Jeremy Lister	Sign Language – EP	Co-Writer
2018	"Slow Burn"	Kacey Musgraves	Golden Hour	Producer/Co-writer
2018	"Lonely Weekend"	Kacey Musgraves	Golden Hour	Producer/Co-writer
2018	"Butterflies"	Kacey Musgraves	Golden Hour	Producer
2018	"Oh, What A World"	Kacey Musgraves	Golden Hour	Producer/Co-writer
2018	"Mother"	Kacey Musgraves	Golden Hour	Producer/Co-writer
2018	"Love Is A Wild Thing"	Kacey Musgraves	Golden Hour	Producer/Co-writer
2018	"Space Cowboy"	Kacey Musgraves	Golden Hour	Producer
2018	"Happy & Sad"	Kacey Musgraves	Golden Hour	Producer/Co-Writer
2018	"Velvet Elvis"	Kacey Musgraves	Golden Hour	Producer
2018	"Wonder Woman"	Kacey Musgraves	Golden Hour	Producer
2018	"High Horse"	Kacey Musgraves	Golden Hour	Producer
2018	"Golden Hour"	Kacey Musgraves	Golden Hour	Producer/Co-Writer
2018	"Rainbow"	Kacey Musgraves	Golden Hour	Producer
2018	"Face the Sun"	Nashville Cast, Charles Esten	The Music of Nashville: Original Soundtrack Season 6, Vol. 1	Co-Writer
2018	"Tangerine"	Lydia Luce	Azalea	Co-Writer
2018	"Covered Up"	Lydia Luce	Azalea	Co-Writer
2018	"Morning Is Made"	Hush Kids	Hush Kids	Producer/Co-writer
2018	"What's Your Hurry"	Hush Kids	Hush Kids	Producer/Co-writer
2018	"Goodbye Rain"	Hush Kids	Hush Kids	Producer
2018	"Beauty All Around"	Hush Kids	Hush Kids	Producer
2018	"Wake Up"	Hush Kids	Hush Kids	Producer
2018	"Love Is a Made Up Word"	Hush Kids	Hush Kids	Producer
2018	"Color of Sadness"	Hush Kids	Hush Kids	Producer/Co-writer
2018	"Oasis"	Hush Kids	Hush Kids	Producer/Co-writer
2018	"Talking to Myself"	Hush Kids	Hush Kids	Producer
2018	"All My Love"	Hush Kids	Hush Kids	Producer
2018	"Castles"	Lissie	Castles	Co-Writer
2018	"Best Days"	Lissie	Castles	Co-Writer
2018	"Everything With Everything"	Dave Barnes	Who Knew It Would Be So Hard To Be Myself	Co-Writer
2017	"This Side of Paradise"	Marie Miller	Letterbox	Co-Writer
2017	"The Morning Song"	Drew Holcomb and the Neighbors	Souvenir	Producer
2017	"California"	Drew Holcomb and the Neighbors	Souvenir	Producer
2017	"Fight for Love"	Drew Holcomb and the Neighbors	Souvenir	Producer
2017	"Rowdy Heart, Broken Wing"	Drew Holcomb and the Neighbors	Souvenir	Producer
2017	"New Year"	Drew Holcomb and the Neighbors	Souvenir	Producer
2017	"Sometimes"	Drew Holcomb and the Neighbors	Souvenir	Producer
2017	"Mama's Sunshine, Daddy's Rain"	Drew Holcomb and the Neighbors	Souvenir	Producer
2017	"Black and Blue"	Drew Holcomb and the Neighbors	Souvenir	Producer
2017	"Postcard Memories"	Drew Holcomb and the Neighbors	Souvenir	Producer
2017	"Yellow Rose of Santa Fe"	Drew Holcomb and the Neighbors	Souvenir	Producer
2017	"Wild World"	Drew Holcomb and the Neighbors	Souvenir	Producer
2017	"Groundswell"	Angaleena Prresley	Wrangled	Co-Writer
2016	"Shine On!"	Muddy Magnolias	Broken People	Co-Writer
2016	"Holy Days"	Sean McConnell	Sean McConnell	Producer
2016	"Ghost Town"	Sean McConnell	Sean McConnell	Producer
2016	"Bottom of the Sea"	Sean McConnell	Sean McConnell	Producer
2016	"Beautiful Rose"	Sean McConnell	Sean McConnell	Producer
2016	"Hey Mary"	Sean McConnell	Sean McConnell	Producer
2016	"Best We've Ever Been"	Sean McConnell	Sean McConnell	Producer
2016	"Queen of Saint Mary's Choir"	Sean McConnell	Sean McConnell	Producer
2016	"Running Under Water"	Sean McConnell	Sean McConnell	Producer
2016	"One Acre of Land"	Sean McConnell	Sean McConnell	Producer
2016	"Babylon"	Sean McConnell	Sean McConnell	Producer
2016	"Live Like Legends"	Ruelle	Madness	Co-Writer
2016	"Everything"	Parachute	Wide Awake	Co-Writer
2016	"Foolin'"	Andrew Combs	All These Dreams	Co-Writer
2016	"Suburbs"	Zoe Sky Jordan	Topiary	Co-Writer/Co-producer
2016	"Attention"	Zoe Sky Jordan	Topiary	Co-producer
2016	"Golden Kimono"	Zoe Sky Jordan	Topiary	Co-writer/Co-producer
2016	"True 2 U"	Zoe Sky Jordan	Topiary	Co-producer
2016	"Smoke"	Zoe Sky Jordan	Topiary	Co-writer/Co-producer
2016	"Soft Reply"	Zoe Sky Jordan	Topiary	Co-writer/Co-producer
2016	"Powerlines"	Zoe Sky Jordan	Topiary	Co-producer
2016	"Cloud"	Zoe Sky Jordan	Topiary	Co-writer/Co-producer
2016	"Dragging Your Bones"	Zoe Sky Jordan	Topiary	Co-producer
2016	"Love Will Find You"	Kris Allen	Letting You In	Co-producer
2016	"Time Will Come"	Kris Allen	Letting You In	Co-producer
2016	"Waves"	Kris Allen	Letting You In	Co-producer
2016	"Faster Shoes"	Kris Allen	Letting You In	Co-producer
2016	"If We Keep Doing Nothing"	Kris Allen	Letting You In	Co-producer
2016	"Way up High"	Kris Allen	Letting You In	Co-producer
2016	"Feeling This Way"	Kris Allen	Letting You In	Co-producer
2016	"Letting You In"	Kris Allen	Letting You In	Co-producer
2016	"Move"	Kris Allen	Letting You In	Co-producer
2016	"I Remember You"	Kris Allen	Letting You In	Co-producer
2015	"How To Lose It All"	Lucie Silvas	Letters To Ghosts	Co-Writer
2015	"Pull the Stars Down"	Lucie Silvas	Letters To Ghosts	Co-Writer
2015	"Avalanche"	Drew Holcomb and The Neighbors	Medicine	Co-Writer
2014	"The Mighty Storm"	Peter Bradley Adams	The Mighty Storm	Producer
2014	"Hey Believers"	Peter Bradley Adams	The Mighty Storm	Producer
2014	"Feathers in Her Crown"	Peter Bradley Adams	The Mighty Storm	Producer
2014	"When the Cold Comes"	Peter Bradley Adams	The Mighty Storm	Producer
2014	"Gypsy Lady"	Peter Bradley Adams	The Mighty Storm	Producer
2014	"She Has to Come Down"	Peter Bradley Adams	The Mighty Storm	Producer
2014	"New Orleans"	Peter Bradley Adams	The Mighty Storm	Producer
2014	"Around Us"	Peter Bradley Adams	The Mighty Storm	Producer
2014	"Skyline Motel"	Skyline Motel	Skyline Motel EP	Co-Writer/Producer
2014	Language of Love"	Skyline Motel	Skyline Motel EP	Co-Writer/Producer
2014	"Sleep With Me"	Skyline Motel	Skyline Motel EP	Co-Writer/Producer
2014	"Feel Like Singing"	Skyline Motel	Skyline Motel EP	Co-Writer/Producer
2014	"Not About You"	Skyline Motel	Skyline Motel EP	Co-Writer/Producer
2014	"Champagne Makes Me Cry"	Skyline Motel	Champagne Makes Me Cry – Single	Co-Producer
2014	"Blind"	Nashville Cast	Blind – Single	Co-Writer
2014	"Bummin' Cigarettes"	Maren Morris	Hero – Target Exclusive	Co-Writer
2014	"Got That Feeling"	Alyssa Bonagura	Love Hard	Co-Writer
2013	"Estrellita (Twinkle, Twinkle Little Star)"	Jaci Velasquez	Buenas Noches Mi Sol	Producer
2013	"Tres Avecitas (Three Little Birds)"	Jaci Velasquez	Buenas Noches Mi Sol	Producer
2013	"Canción De Cuna"	Jaci Velasquez	Buenas Noches Mi Sol	Producer
2013	"La Manita"	Jaci Velasquez	Buenas Noches Mi Sol	Producer
2013	"Tú (You)"	Jaci Velasquez	Buenas Noches Mi Sol	Producer
2013	"Arrurú"	Jaci Velasquez	Buenas Noches Mi Sol	Producer
2013	"La Nanita Nana"	Jaci Velasquez	Buenas Noches Mi Sol	Producer
2013	"Dios Te Ama (God Loves You)"	Jaci Velasquez	Buenas Noches Mi Sol	Producer
2013	"Sonríe (Smile)"	Jaci Velasquez	Buenas Noches Mi Sol	Producer
2013	"Hola Mi Sol (Good Morning Sunshine)"	Jaci Velasquez	Buenas Noches Mi Sol	Producer
2013	"Un Lugar Celestial (A Heavenly Place)"	Jaci Velasquez	Buenas Noches Mi Sol	Producer
2013	"Tú Eres Mi Dicha (You Are My Sunshine)"	Jaci Velasquez	Buenas Noches Mi Sol	Producer
2013	"Descansaré En Ti (I Will Rest in You)"	Jaci Velasquez	Buenas Noches Mi Sol	Producer
2013	"Duérmete Mi Niño"	Jaci Velasquez	Buenas Noches Mi Sol	Producer
2013	"Mardi Gras"	Marc Broussard	Live at Full Sail University	Co-Writer
2013	"Sonya's Song"	Marc Broussard	Live at Full Sail University	Co-Writer
2012	"Highs and Lows"	Mindy Smith	The Essential	Producer
2012	"Love Lost"	Mindy Smith	The Essential	Producer
2012	"Johnny"	Madi Diaz	Plastic Moon	Co-Writer
2012	"Sons of Venice"	Upon This Dawning	To Keep Us Safe	Co-Writer
2011	"I Hate You I Love You"	Emily West	I Hate You I Love You	Co-Writer
2011	"Naturally"	Matt Wertz	Everything in Between	Co-Writer
2011	"Ready to Fall"	Jeremy Lister	Just One Day – EP	Co-Writer
2010	"Someday Our King Will Come"	Natalie Grant	Love Revolution	Co-Writer
2010	"Ride the Weather"	Peter Groenwald	Sweet Science	Co-Writer
2010	"Hard Times"	Amy Grant	Somewhere Down The Road	Producer/Co-Writer
2010	"Third World Woman"	Amy Grant	Somewhere Down The Road	Producer
2010	"If You Want To"	Griffin House	The Learner	Producer
2010	"River City Lights"	Griffin House	The Learner	Producer
2010	"Standing At the Station"	Griffin House	The Learner	Producer
2010	"Just Another Guy"	Griffin House	The Learner	Producer
2010	"She Likes Girls"	Griffin House	The Learner	Producer
2010	"Never Hide"	Griffin House	The Learner	Producer
2010	"Rule the World"	Griffin House	The Learner	Producer
2010	"Gotta Get Out"	Griffin House	The Learner	Producer
2010	"Feels So Right"	Griffin House	The Learner	Producer/Co-Writer
2010	"Let My People Go"	Griffin House	The Learner	Producer
2010	"Native"	Griffin House	The Learner	Producer
2010	"Coming Down the Road"	Griffin House	The Learner	Producer
2009	"What Went Wrong"	Mindy Smith	Stupid Love	Producer
2009	"Highs and Lows"	Mindy Smith	Stupid Love	Producer
2009	"If I Didn't Know Any Better"	Mindy Smith	Stupid Love	Producer
2009	"Love Lost"	Mindy Smith	Stupid Love	Producer
2009	"Telescope"	Mindy Smith	Stupid Love	Producer
2009	"What Love Can Do"	Mindy Smith	Stupid Love	Producer
2009	"Couldn't Stand the Rain"	Mindy Smith	Stupid Love	Producer
2009	"Bad Guy"	Mindy Smith	Stupid Love	Producer
2009	"Surface"	Mindy Smith	Stupid Love	Producer
2009	"Disappointed"	Mindy Smith	Stupid Love	Producer
2009	"True Love of Mine"	Mindy Smith	Stupid Love	Producer
2009	"Love Chases After Me"	Mindy Smith	Stupid Love	Producer
2009	"Take a Holiday"	Mindy Smith	Stupid Love	Producer
2009	"Brokenhearted Day"	Ashlyn	Dandelion Sessions	Co-Writer
2008	"Comes A Time"	Kate York	Cinnamon Girl (Women Artists Cover Neil Young For Charity)	Producer
2008	"Shout"	De Novo Dahl	Move Every Muscle, Make Every Sound	Producer
2008	"Heartbreaker"	De Novo Dahl	Move Every Muscle, Make Every Sound	Producer
2008	"Means To An End"	De Novo Dahl	Move Every Muscle, Make Every Sound	Producer
2008	"Make Some Sense"	De Novo Dahl	Move Every Muscle, Make Every Sound	Producer
2008	"Be Your Man"	De Novo Dahl	Move Every Muscle, Make Every Sound	Producer
2008	"Shakedown"	De Novo Dahl	Move Every Muscle, Make Every Sound	Producer
2008	"Marketplace"	De Novo Dahl	Move Every Muscle, Make Every Sound	Producer
2008	"The Sky Is Falling"	De Novo Dahl	Move Every Muscle, Make Every Sound	Producer
2008	"New Hero"	De Novo Dahl	Move Every Muscle, Make Every Sound	Producer
2008	"Wishful Thinking"	De Novo Dahl	Move Every Muscle, Make Every Sound	Producer
2008	"Subject Of The Kill"	De Novo Dahl	Move Every Muscle, Make Every Sound	Producer
2008	"Been Kept Up"	De Novo Dahl	Move Every Muscle, Make Every Sound	Producer
2008	"Not To Escape"	De Novo Dahl	Move Every Muscle, Make Every Sound	Producer
2008	"Dreamer"	Bethany Dillon	So Far: The Acoustic Sessions	Producer
2008	"When You Love Someone"	Bethany Dillon	So Far: The Acoustic Sessions	Producer
2008	"We Can Work It Out"	Bethany Dillon	So Far: The Acoustic Sessions	Producer
2008	"Top of the World"	Bethany Dillon	So Far: The Acoustic Sessions	Producer
2008	"Hallelujah"	Bethany Dillon	So Far: The Acoustic Sessions	Producer
2008	"All I Need"	Bethany Dillon	So Far: The Acoustic Sessions	Producer
2008	"The Kingdom"	Bethany Dillon	So Far: The Acoustic Sessions	Producer
2008	"Hero"	Bethany Dillon	So Far: The Acoustic Sessions	Producer
2008	"Beautiful"	Bethany Dillon	So Far: The Acoustic Sessions	Producer
2008	"Let Your Light Shine"	Bethany Dillon	So Far: The Acoustic Sessions	Producer
2007	"Comes A Time"	Matt Wertz	Everything in Between	Co-Writer
2007	"Let Me In"	Griffin House	Flying Upside Down	Co-Writer
2007	"Live to be Free"	Griffin House	Flying Upside Down	Co-Writer
2007	"Shout"	De Novo Dahl	Shout	Producer
2007	"Dance Like David"	De Novo Dahl	Shout	Producer
2007	"Crap Your Pants Say Shout"	De Novo Dahl	Shout	Producer
2007	"Dance Like David Benson"	De Novo Dahl	Shout	Producer
2004	"Lonely People"	Jars of Clay	Everwood (Original TV Soundtrack)	Producer
2004	"Trouble"	Kristin Hersh	Everwood (Original TV Soundtrack)	Producer
2004	"These Days"	Griffin House	Everwood (Original TV Soundtrack)	Producer
2004	"Only Living Boy in New York"	David Mead	Everwood (Original TV Soundtrack)	Producer
2004	"Summer Breeze"	Jason Mraz	Everwood (Original TV Soundtrack)	Producer
2004	"Father and Son"	Leigh Nash	Everwood (Original TV Soundtrack)	Producer
2004	"The Harder They Come"	Guster	Everwood (Original TV Soundtrack)	Producer
2004	"Don't Be Shy"	Travis	Everwood (Original TV Soundtrack)	Producer
2004	"Operator (That's Not the Way It Feels)"	Toby Lightman	Everwood (Original TV Soundtrack)	Producer
2004	"The First Time Ever I Saw Your Face"	Stereophonics	Everwood (Original TV Soundtrack)	Producer
2004	"Cathedrals"	Jump, Little Children	Everwood (Original TV Soundtrack)	Producer
2004	"Main Title Theme for Everwood"	Blake Neely	Everwood (Original TV Soundtrack)	Producer
2004	"Love Song"	Treat Williams	Everwood (Original TV Soundtrack)	Producer
2004	"Amsterdam"	Griffin House	Lost & Found	Producer
2004	"Ah Me"	Griffin House	Lost & Found	Producer
2004	"Tell Me A Lie"	Griffin House	Lost & Found	Producer
2004	"Waste Another Day"	Griffin House	Lost & Found	Producer
2004	"Waterfall"	Griffin House	Lost & Found	Producer
2004	"Liberty Line"	Griffin House	Lost & Found	Producer
2004	"The Way I Was Made"	Griffin House	Lost & Found	Producer
2004	"Why Won't You Believe?"	Griffin House	Lost & Found	Producer
2004	"Just A Dream"	Griffin House	Lost & Found	Producer
2004	"Missed My Change"	Griffin House	Lost & Found	Producer
2004	"New Day"	Griffin House	Lost & Found	Producer
2004	"Got Me Smilin'"	Silers Bald	Real Life	Producer
2004	"Real Life"	Silers Bald	Real Life	Producer
2004	"Hy Heart Will Sing"	Silers Bald	Real Life	Producer
2004	"Emmanuel"	Silers Bald	Real Life	Producer
2004	"Carolina Line"	Silers Bald	Real Life	Producer
2004	"Feel"	Silers Bald	Real Life	Producer
2004	"So On"	Silers Bald	Real Life	Producer
2004	"All I Can Be"	Silers Bald	Real Life	Producer
2004	"Room Song"	Silers Bald	Real Life	Producer
2004	"Turn"	Silers Bald	Real Life	Producer
2004	"Truly Gifted"	Silers Bald	Real Life	Producer
2004	"All This Time"	Rachel Lampa	Rachel Lampa	Co-Writer

== Accolades ==
Year	Association	Work	Category	Result
2018	Country Music Association Awards	Golden Hour	Album of the Year	Won
2019	Grammy Awards	Golden Hour	Album of the Year	Won
2019	Grammy Awards	Golden Hour	Best Country Album	Won
2019	Academy of Country Music Awards	Golden Hour	Album of the Year	Won
2019	Academy of Country Music Awards	Himself	Producer of the Year	Nominated
2019	Academy of Country Music Awards	Himself	Drummer of the Year	Nominated
2019	Academy of Country Music Awards	Himself	Bass Player of the Year	Nominated
2019	Academy of Country Music Awards	Himself	Piano Keyboard Player of the Year	Nominated
2019	Academy of Country Music Awards	Himself	Specialty Instrumentalist of the Year	Nominated
2021	Grammy Awards	Nightfall	Best Country Album	Nominated
2022	Grammy Awards	"camera roll"	Best Country Song	Nominated
2025	Grammy Awards	Himself	Producer of the Year, Non-Classical	Nominated
2025	Grammy Awards	Deeper Well	Best Country Album	Pending
2025	Country Music Association Awards	Deeper Well	Album of the Year	Pending
