= Flatland Cavalry =

American country and Americana band

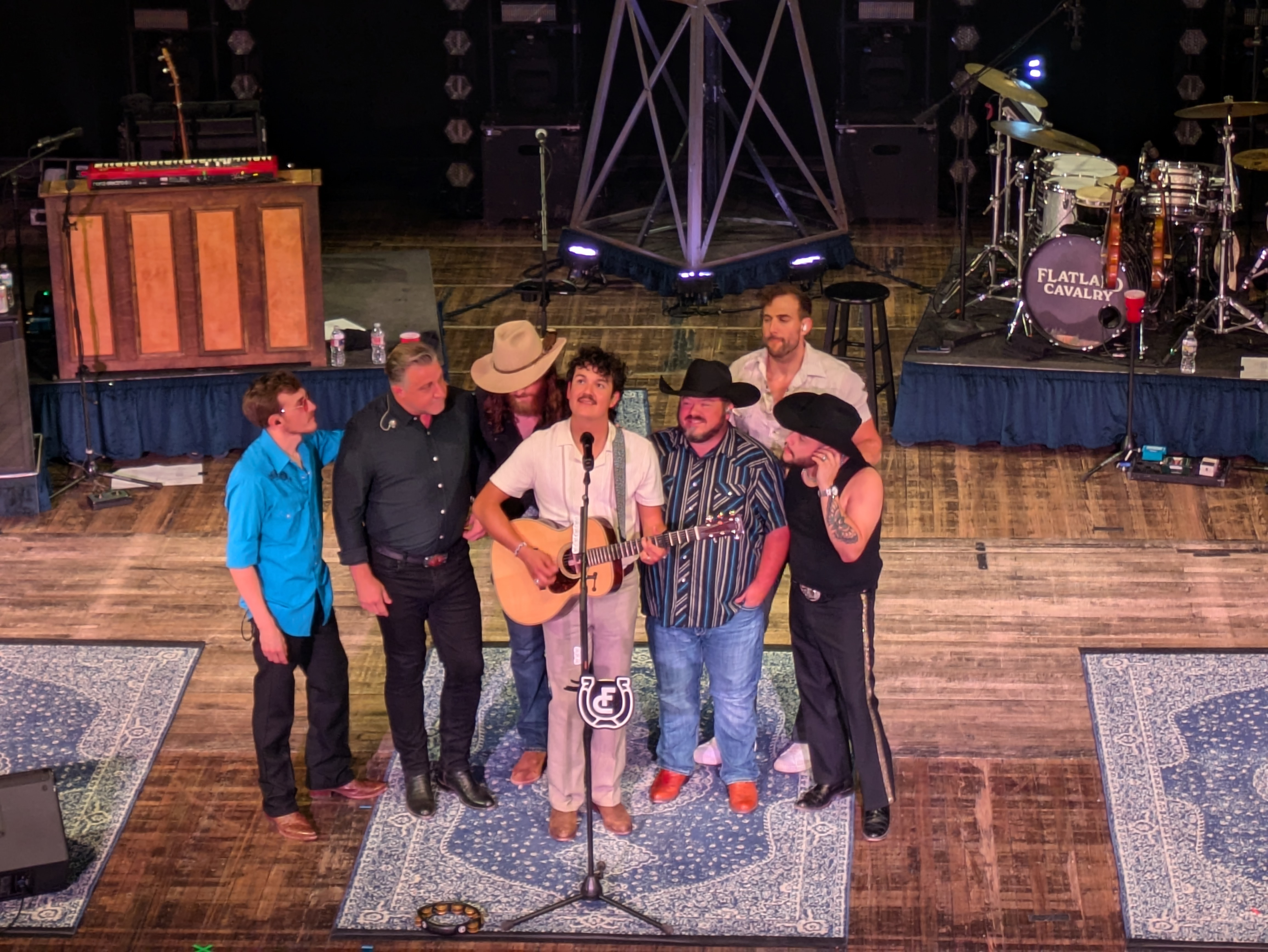
- Flatland Cavalry performing in 2024 at the Florida Theatre in Jacksonville, FL

Background information
- Origin: Lubbock, Texas
- Genres: Country, americana, folk rock, Texas country
- Years active: 2012–present
- Labels: Flatland Cavalry, Interscope
- Members: Cleto Cordero; Reid Dillon; Wesley Hall; Jason Albers; Adam Gallegos
- Past members: Laura Jane Jonathan Saenz
- Website: https://www.flatlandcavalry.com/

Flatland Cavalry is a country and Americana band from Lubbock, Texas. The band's original members were vocalist Cleto Cordero, drummer Jason Albers, bassist Jonathan Saenz, guitarist Reid Dillon, and violinist Laura Jane. Jane departed the band in July 2018 and was replaced by Wesley Hall.

Flatland Cavalry was formed in 2012 by Cordero and Albers, who were college roommates in Midland and performed together before moving to Lubbock, where the rest of the members came together by 2014. In May 2015, the band's debut EP, Come May, was released after a crowd-funding campaign was used to finance its production. On April 1, 2016, their first full-length album, Humble Folks, was released to positive reviews and comparisons to the music of the Turnpike Troubadours. Humble Folks peaked at number 17 on the Billboard Americana/Folk Albums chart and number 38 on the Top Country Albums chart. The band's second studio album, Homeland Insecurity, was released on January 18, 2019. They have released five studio albums in total, most recently Work of Heart in 2026.

Flatland Cavalry was inducted into the West Texas Walk of Fame on October 9, 2025, in Lubbock, Texas.

Kaitlin Butts, who is married to Cordero, is a frequent collaborator with the band and an oft-seen part of their live shows.

== Formation ==
The roots for the formation of Flatland Cavalry were first laid when Cleto Cordero and Jason Albers began playing at local venues while rooming together at Midland College. The two had been jamming together since junior high but it was not until they moved to Lubbock in 2012 that the band began to take shape. It was here, while studying at Texas Tech University, that the duo met Laura Jane at a house party. Jonathan Saenz and Reid Dillon joined the rest in 2014 and the band's lineup was complete.

Cordero himself began playing the guitar at age 14 and wrote his first song by the time he was 17 years old for Lee High School's Rebel Lee Court Awards Ceremony. He writes most of the band's songs apart from playing the role of lead guitarist and singer with Jason Albers on drums, Jonathan Saenz on bass, Reid Dillon on guitar and Wesley Hall on fiddle. Hall took the place of Laura Jane when she parted ways with the band in 2018.

== Career ==
The band released its first EP, Come May, in 2015, gathering funds for its production via a crowdfunding platform. The band reached its goal of $5,000 in eight days.

After the release of their first album, Humble Folks, journalists compared Flatland Cavalry to the likes of the Turnpike Troubadours, complimenting the band for its blend of youthful country, folk, Americana and rock. Humble Folks peaked at number 38 on the Billboard Top Country Albums chart and number 17 on the Americana/Folk Albums chart.

In 2018, Laura Jane left the band and was replaced by Wesley Hall on fiddle. With the new lineup in place, the quintet released their second album, Homeland Insecurity, in 2019; three years after the release of their debut. In the time that lapsed between the two, the band toured extensively. As the band's primary songwriter, Cordero also penned lyrics for Homeland Insecurity. The album was well-received and praised for its distinctive sound.

The band announced the release of their fourth studio album, Wandering Star, on October 27, 2023. The album is their first release on Interscope Records, which follows their 2022 EP, Songs to Keep You Warm. Wandering Star consists of 13 solo tracks and one collaborative track featuring Kaitlin Butts.

Flatland Cavalry announced the release of their fifth studio album, Work of Heart, on February 11, 2026. The album consists of 12 solo tracks.

== Discography ==
=== Albums ===
- Humble Folks (2016)
- Homeland Insecurity (2019)
- Welcome to Countryland (2021)
- Wandering Star (2023)
- Flatland Forever (2024)
- Work of Heart (2026)

=== EPs ===
- Come May (2015)
- Songs to Keep You Warm (2022)

=== Singles ===
List of singles, with selected chart positions
Title	Year	Peak chart positions	Album
Title	Year	US Country Airplay	Album
"Never Comin' Back"	2026	25	Work of Heart

== Tours ==
Starting in 2015, Flatland Cavalry played in their hometown of Lubbock, Texas. They moved around the state playing festivals, bars, and small venues before branching out in 2016. Playing all over the United States, the band announced their first official tour in 2019.

- West Coast Tour (October 2019 – November 2019)
- Welcome to Countryland Tour (June 2021 – December 2021)
- Gettin' By Tour (January 2022 – May 2022)
- Far Out West Tour (May 2022 – December 2022)
- North American Tour (February 2023 – October 2023)
- Wandering Star Tour (December 2023 – November 2024)
- Flatland Forever Tour (February 2025 – July 2025)
- Flatland Forever(more) Tour (July 2025 – November 2025)

== Awards and nominations ==
Year	Association	Category	Nominated work	Result	Ref.
2024	Academy of Country Music Awards	Group of the Year	Themselves	Nominated	
2025	Academy of Country Music Awards	Group of the Year	Themselves	Nominated	
2026	Academy of Country Music Awards	Group of the Year	Themselves	Pending	
