= Lost Highway Records =

- Parent company: Universal Music Group
- Founded: 2000
- Founder: Luke Lewis
- Distributor: Interscope Capitol Labels Group (USA)
- Genre: Rock, Country, Folk
- Country of origin: USA
- Location: Nashville, Tennessee, USA
- Official website: losthighwayrecords.com

Lost Highway Records is a record label owned by Universal Music Group. Formed by Luke Lewis in 2000, Lost Highway Records operates as a country music label, based out of Nashville, but the label also issues music by alternative rock and alternative country artists such as Morrissey and Ryan Adams. The company's name was inspired by a Hank Williams song. Today the label operates in conjunction with Interscope Capitol Labels Group.

Notable artists include Ryan Adams, Hayes Carll, Elvis Costello, Eagles, Bernard Fanning, Donavon Frankenreiter, Mary Gauthier, Golden Smog, Ringo Starr, The Jayhawks, Shelby Lynne, Tift Merritt, Van Morrison, Morrissey, Willie Nelson, Fionn Regan, Lucinda Williams.

Additionally Lost Highway distributed the soundtracks for O' Brother, Where Art Thou?, Deadwood, and Open Season by Paul Westerberg. They have also acted as distributor for albums from Johnny Cash and Lyle Lovett.

The label went dormant in 2012 after Lewis retired, but it was revived in 2025 by Interscope Records.

== Lost Highway Records recording artists ==
Lost Highway reissues recordings from the various Universal Music Group labels. Only artists with original recordings first issued on the Lost Highway label are to be listed here.

- Ryan Adams
- Ryan Bingham
- Hayes Carll
- Elvis Costello
- Eagles
- Bernard Fanning
- Johnny Flynn
- Donavon Frankenreiter
- Mary Gauthier
- Jayhawks
- Black Joe Lewis & the Honeybears
- Lyle Lovett (Lost Highway/Curb)
- Shelby Lynne
- Tift Merritt
- Van Morrison
- Morrissey
- Kacey Musgraves
- Willie Nelson
- Night Train to Nashville
- Tim O'Reagan
- Fionn Regan
- Kim Richey
- Golden Smog
- Ringo Starr
- Whiskeytown
- Lucinda Williams
- Laci Kaye Booth
