= Longneck Way to Go =

2022 single by Midland and Jon Pardi

Single by Midland featuring Jon Pardi

from the album The Last Resort: Greetings From and Mr. Saturday Night
- Released: April 22, 2022
- Studio: Blackbird Studio, Nashville
- Genre: Country
- Length: 3:08
- Label: Big Machine
- Songwriters: Rhett Akins; Jess Carson; Cameron Duddy; Ashley Gorley; Mark Wystrach
- Producers: Josh Osborne; Shane McAnally; Dann Huff

Midland singles chronology
"Sunrise Tells the Story" (2021)	"Longneck Way to Go" (2022)	"I Wish You Would" (2025)

Jon Pardi singles chronology
"Last Night Lonely" (2022)	"Longneck Way To Go" (2022)	"Your Heart or Mine" (2022)

Music video
- "Longneck Way to Go" on YouTube

"Longneck Way to Go" is a song recorded by American country music band Midland featuring fellow neotraditional country artist Jon Pardi. It is the second single from their third studio album The Last Resort: Greetings From and is also included in the track list of Pardi's fourth album Mr. Saturday Night. The single was released to country radio on April 22, 2022. The band wrote the song with Ashley Gorley and Rhett Akins. The song was nominated for Musical Event of the Year and Video of the Year at the 56th Country Music Association Awards.

To promote the song, Midland performed it with Pardi on Jimmy Kimmel Live! on October 14, 2022.

== Content ==
Prior to the announcement of the single, the band began teasing a collaboration with Pardi by posting images of them on social media at a bowling alley.

The song is about using alcohol as a way to get over a breakup, with the narrator stating that, despite the bar nearing closing time, he still has a "longneck way to go" before he is over his ex. It was written in 2020 over Zoom during the COVID-19 pandemic and developed from an idea by co-writer Ashley Gorley, who already had the title and a loose concept for the song in one of his notebooks. Rhett Akins then wrote almost the entire song after hearing the title, noting that the word "longneck" prompted him to set the song in a bar, and that he used an unconventional structure by including a bridge before the second chorus, and that the band needed to do a bit of reworking to make the song fit their sound.

In an interview with Billboard, band member Jess Carson explained that, when the band recorded the song on August 17, 2021, with producers Shane McAnally, Dan Huff and Josh Osborne, they worked hard to differentiate it from their previous singles "Make a Little" and "Mr. Lonely" by playing around with the beats and tempo. In the same interview, band member Cameron Duddy likened the vocal harmonies in the song to the sound of Crosby Stills & Nash, Jackson Browne and the Eagles, explaining “stuff with long vowels — that’s primetime for country music harmony. ‘Longneck Way To Go’ has got a few of those, so it’s easy to kind of imagine what it would be like as soon as you got into the studio, cutting harmonies. And that’s right there in our sweet spot.” Carson added that steel guitarist Paul Franklin used a distortion pedal similar to one used by David Lindley, one of Browne's sidemen, that they chose to use an instrumental fadeout akin to the Eagles "Take It Easy" and Browne's "Running on Empty" and that Ilya Toshinskiy's banjo parts in the song are deliberately reminiscent of song of the Eagles' country recordings.

Pardi recorded his version separately and allowed the producers to choose the sections that worked best. Of Pardi's addition to the song, Midland's least vocalist Mark Wystrach stated “when we heard Jon’s part, it was a treat — competitive, in one way or another. Jon was like, ‘All right, motherf–kers.’ I think he gave one of his best vocal performances.”

== Music video ==
The music video was released on May 2, 2022, and was filmed at Nashville's Eastside Bowl by director Harper Smith. Discussing the process, Wystrach stated “it was a genuine party, and literally Harper just yelling that we have to get these shots done. The video itself was just kind of an inconvenience in the midst of this party.” It was nominated for Collaborative Video of the Year at the 2023 CMT Music Awards.

== Charts ==
Chart performance for "Longneck Way to Go"
Chart (2022)	Peak position
US Country Airplay (Billboard)	52
