= Sunrise Tells the Story =

2021 single by Midland

Single by Midland

from the album The Last Resort: Greetings From
- Released: January 21, 2021
- Studio: Blackbird (Nashville, Tennessee)
- Genre: Country
- Length: 3:28
- Label: Big Machine
- Songwriters: Jessi Alexander; Jess Carson; Aaron Raitiere
- Producers: Josh Osborne; Shane McAnally; Dann Huff

Midland singles chronology
| "Cheatin' Songs" (2020) | "Sunrise Tells the Story" (2021) | "Longneck Way to Go" (2022) |

"Sunrise Tells the Story" is a song recorded by American country music band Midland. It was first included on their extended play The Last Resort and was released on January 21, 2021, as the lead single from their third studio album The Last Resort: Greetings From. The track was written by Midland's rhythm guitarist Jess Carson alongside songwriters Jessi Alexander and Aaron Raitiere. Lyrically, the song centers on a man wondering whether a one-night stand may lead to something more.

== Background ==
Discussing the creation of the song with Billboard, Carson explained "that was a title that Jessi had. I remember her saying she felt it could be a song about waking up after a party when maybe you’re hung over. I thought it could tell a little more of a serious story that was more open-ended. Maybe they end up married, you don't know."

== Music video ==
The song's video was released on January 21, 2021, and was directed by band member Cameron Duddy. Conceptually, the video is a take on the 1982 romantic comedy film An Officer and a Gentleman and depicts lead singer Mark Wystrach as a Marine trying to win the affections of Janey, the daughter of his commanding officer, while at the latter's retirement party. When discussing the formulation of the video, Duddy explained, "We've always loved pop culture and the way it threads through how people live. Done properly, it becomes what people reference in their lives... and when we were trying to think of how to represent this song, we wanted something more than just the obvious reference to a guy and a girl getting together", with Carson adding "we wanted to show people our own dynamic, too. How do you show our friendship in a way that's not just a bunch of guys on the road?"

== Charts ==
Chart performance for "Sunrise Tells the Story"
| Chart (2021) | Peak position |
|---|---|
| US Country Airplay (Billboard) | 42 |
