= Midland (EP) =

EP by Midland
- Released: October 28, 2016
- Genre: Country
- Length: 17:20
- Label: Big Machine
- Producer: Shane McAnally; Dann Huff; Josh Osborne

Midland chronology
| Midland (2016) | On the Rocks (2017) |

Midland is the first extended play from American country music group Midland. The EP includes the band's debut single "Drinkin' Problem", along with four other songs that can also be found on the band's full-length debut album. This EP takes on the elements of smooth '80s country and wistful '70s classic rock along with a tuneful pop aspect. It was produced by Dan Huff and Shane McAnally.

On March 9, 2016, Mark Wystrach, Jess Carson, and Cameron Duddy signed to Big Machine Records and released the five-song EP, Midland. The song "Drinkin' Problem" charted on both the Hot Country Songs and Country Airplay charts.

== Background ==
Midland made their label debut in 2016 with this self-titled EP, which showcases their warm, harmonic blend and hook-filled songwriting on songs such as "Drinkin' Problem" and top three hit "Burn Out". In September 2017, they expanded the EP to the full length version, On the Rocks, featuring several songs from the EP and made it into the top 20 of the Billboard 200 albums chart and number one on the Top Country Albums chart.

"Drinkin' Problem" earned Midland their first Grammy Awards nomination for Best Country Song and Best Country Duo/Group Performance. They were also named New Vocal Group of the Year at the 2018 ACM Awards. "Burn Out" reached the top 15 at Country radio.

== Composition ==
The song “Drinkin’ Problem” is about a man who is out “at the bar drinking” and claims that “people say I got a drinkin’ problem, but I got no problem drinkin’ at all.” This mid-tempo country music song brings out a dark theme to relate to those who grew up and realized that they find happiness within the bottom of a bottle. It has a Jimmy Buffett, James Taylor feel to it. It was written with Shane McAnally and Josh Osborne.

The song "Check Cashin' Country" is about "the sacrifices and struggles of the ensemble on their path to notoriety, specifically the long travels as well as time away from family and friends while they pursued their careers. This song is more authentic to the genera of country.

“Burn Out” is a classic country heartbreak song that describes a guy who was consumed by a girl that he was so in love with. After the relationship diminished into ashes, he was left with the “smokin’ memories.” The now lonely guy spends most of his nights out at a bar surrounded by “empty glasses and burnt out cigarettes.”

The song “This Old Heart” describes a lonely man who was in some rough and heartbreaking relationships in his past that left him empty hearted. He states that he is willing to “take a chance” with someone else now, but his heart “needs a break” from the pain and needs “some loving.”

“Electric Rodeo” sets a visual component to their music. It talks about their rise to the stage and to fame and how life before was “dark” and “all alone.”

== Track listing ==
| No. | Title | Writer(s) | Length |
|---|---|---|---|
| 1. | "Drinkin' Problem" | Jess Carson, Cameron Duddy, Mark Wystrach, Shane McAnally, Josh Osborne | 3:41 |
| 2. | "Check Cashin' Country" | Carson | 3:50 |
| 3. | "Burn Out" | Carson, Duddy, Wystrach, McAnally, Osborne | 3:10 |
| 4. | "This Old Heart" | Carson, Wystrach, David Lee Murphy, Jonathan Singleton | 3:15 |
| 5. | "Electric Rodeo" | Carson, Duddy, Wystrach, McAnally, Osborne | 3:24 |
| Total length: | | | 17:20 |

== Charts ==
The album reached No. 18 on the Top Heatseekers chart. It has sold 19,500 copies in the US as of August 2017.

| Chart (2017) | Peak position |
|---|---|
| US Heatseekers Albums (Billboard) | 18 |
