= Cheatin' Songs =

2020 single by Midland

Single by Midland

from the album Let It Roll
- Released: January 21, 2020
- Genre: Country
- Length: 3:35
- Label: Big Machine
- Songwriters: Mark Wystrach; Jess Carson; Cameron Duddy; Josh Osborne; Shane McAnally
- Producers: Josh Osborne; Shane McAnally; Dann Huff

Midland singles chronology
"Mr. Lonely" (2019)	"Cheatin' Songs" (2020)	"Sunrise Tells the Story" (2021)

"Cheatin' Songs" is a song recorded by American country music band Midland. It is the second single from their second studio album Let It Roll. The band wrote the song with Josh Osborne and Shane McAnally.

== Content ==
Mark Wystrach, Jess Carson, and Cameron Duddy wrote the song with Shane McAnally and Josh Osborne. The song is about a man who wonders if his partner is cheating on him.

== Music video ==
The music video was filmed during a live performance from the Palomino, a small club in North Hollywood, directed by Collin Duddy. The group is seen performing the song.

== Charts ==
=== Weekly charts ===
Chart (2020)	Peak position
Canada Country (Billboard)	48
US Country Airplay (Billboard)	26
US Hot Country Songs (Billboard)	41

=== Year-end charts ===
Chart (2020)	Position
US Hot Country Songs (Billboard)	100

== Certifications ==
Region	Certification	Certified units/sales
United States (RIAA)	Gold	500,000^{‡}
^{‡} Sales+streaming figures based on certification alone.
