= The Last Resort: Greetings From =

Studio album by Midland
- Released: May 6, 2022
- Genre: Neotraditional country
- Length: 41:54
- Label: Big Machine
- Producer: Dann Huff; Shane McAnally; Josh Osborne

Midland chronology
The Last Resort (2021)	The Last Resort: Greetings From (2022)	Barely Blue (2024)

Singles from The Last Resort: Greetings From
- 1. "Sunrise Tells the Story" Released: January 21, 2022; 2. "Longneck Way to Go" Released: April 22, 2022

The Last Resort: Greetings From is the third studio album by American country music group Midland. An expansion of their 2021 extended play The Last Resort, the album is their first since 2018's Let It Roll and was released on May 6, 2022, via Big Machine Records. Produced by Midland's longtime team of Shane McAnally, Dan Huff and Josh Osborne, the album was preceded by the singles "Sunrise Tells the Story" and "Longneck Way to Go", featuring Jon Pardi.

== Background ==
On July 16, 2021, Midland released The Last Resort, their second extended play which eventually served as the foundation for the album. The Last Resort, also produced by Huff, McAnally and Osborne, featured the tracks "And Then Some", "Sunrise Tells the Story", "Two to Two Step", "Take Her Off Your Hands" and "Adios Cowboy", all of which were subsequently included on The Last Resort: Greetings From.

The album was announced on March 4, 2022, alongside the release of the title track as a promotional single. When discussing the album, bassist Cameron Duddy explained to MusicRow that "we wanted ‘The Last Resort’ to be a track released before the album arrives because it's kind of a manifesto for everything else. You know sometimes the last resort doesn't mean you've run out of options, but more that you've decided you're going for the place or the thing that's going to set you free. That freedom of letting go and falling into space, giving it over to fate? That's where real living begins".

In an interview with People, Duddy stated "I really feel like it's our best, most mature-sounding record. The songs and the subjects are right there in the Midland lane, but I think we're exploring different things here and there. I'm not sure if that's coming across for the listener, but it certainly is for us. It feels like an evolution of sorts". In the same interview, lead singer Mark Wystrach expressed that he was initially cautious about the band's evolution on the album, noting "I'll be the first to admit that there were songs on this album that I didn't want to cut because I just didn't see it in the work tape. But once you get in the studio and you're able to start painting and adding colors and tones and textures, that's really when songs come to life. And that's what is so great. In the studio, you get to really bring in all these different paintbrushes."

Escapism is a major theme on the album, with the band explaining that this was influenced by the COVID-19 pandemic, which was occurring while a lot of the songs for the project were being written. Wystrach told Taste Of Country that being unable to tour "allowed us to dive back into a lot of music that we'd been listening to, all styles and types, and you're seeing all that on this record. You're hearing completely new textures and tones and instrumentation on this album, that we've never done before. We were trying to have a good time with a sad time, I guess, so that kind of set the palette, I think, for the rest of the writing and the album."

"Longneck Way to Go", which features guest vocals from Jon Pardi, was released as the album's second single on April 22, 2022.

== Track listing ==
The Last Resort: Greetings From track listing
No.	Title	Writer(s)	Length
1.	"The Last Resort"	Jess Carson; Cameron Duddy; Shane McAnally; Josh Osborne; Mark Wystrach	3:57
2.	"If I Lived Here"	Carson; Duddy; McAnally; Osborne; Wystrach	3:49
3.	"Two to Two Step"	Carson; Duddy; McAnally; Osborne; Wystrach	3:20
4.	"Take Her Off Your Hands"	Carson; Duddy; McAnally; Osborne; Wystrach	3:14
5.	"Sunrise Tells the Story"	Jessi Alexander; Carson; Aaron Raitiere	3:27
6.	"And Then Some"	Carson; Duddy; McAnally; Osborne; Wystrach	3:25
7.	"Longneck Way to Go" (featuring Jon Pardi)	Rhett Akins; Carson; Duddy; Ashley Gorley; Osborne; Wystrach	3:08
8.	"Life Ain't Fair"	Carson	3:48
9.	"King of Saturday Night"	Carson	4:01
10.	"Paycheck to Paycheck"	Atkins; Carson; Duddy; Osborne; Wystrach	2:56
11.	"Bury Me in Blue Jeans"	Carson; Duddy; McAnally; Osborne; Wystrach	3:09
12.	"Adios Cowboy"	Carson; Duddy; Marv Green; J. T. Harding; Wystrach	3:40
Total length:			41:54

== Personnel ==
Midland

- Jess Carson – acoustic guitar, electric guitar, vocals
- Cameron Duddy – bass guitar, vocals
- Mark Wystrach – acoustic guitar, vocals

Additional

- Adam Ayan – mastering
- Drew Bollman – mixing
- Chase Duddy – engineering
- Mike Griffith – production managing
- Dann Huff – production
- David Huff – digital editing
- Steven Marcantonio – engineering
- Shane McAnally – production
- Justin Niebank – mixing
- John Osborne – guitar (tracks 8–10)
- Josh Osborne – production
- Jon Pardi – vocals (track 7)
- Lowell Reynolds – engineering
- Claire Schaper – cover art
- Chris Small – digital editing
- Harper Smith – photography
- Holly Taylor – packaging design
- Michael Walter – engineering

== Charts ==
Chart performance for The Last Resort: Greetings From
Chart (2019)	Peak position
UK Country Albums (OCC)	1
US Top Country Albums (Billboard)	37
US Independent Albums (Billboard)	49
US Top Album Sales (Billboard)	52
