= Alex Flanagan =

American sportscaster (born 1973)

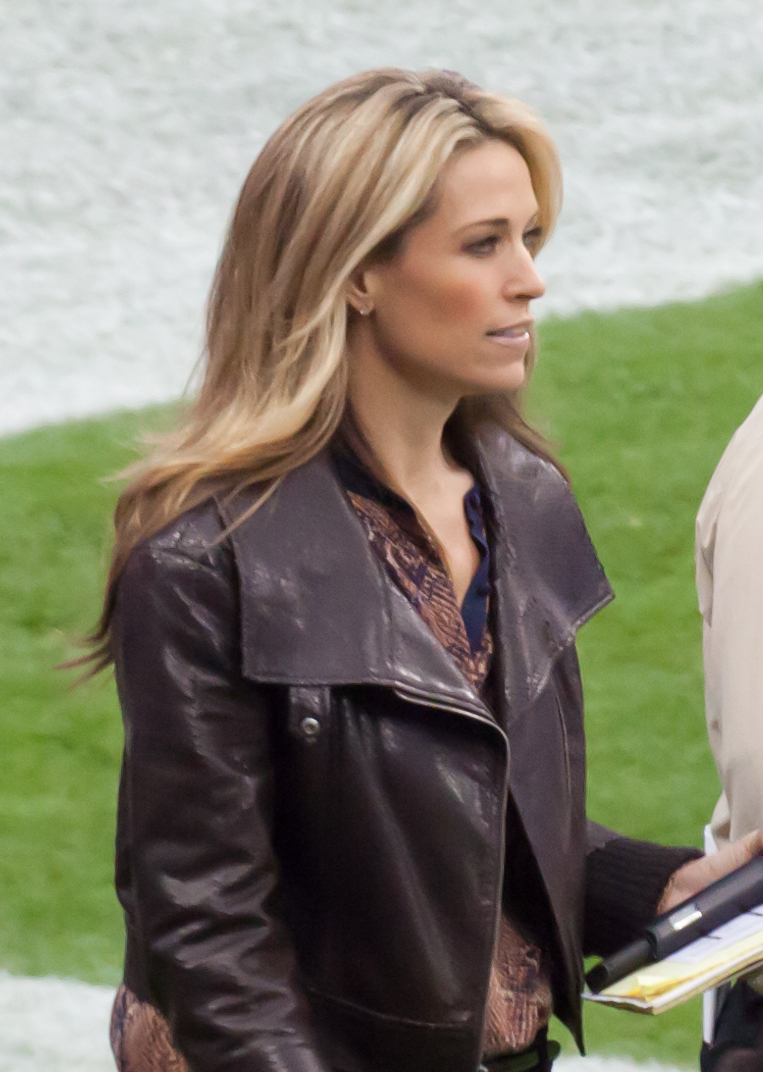
- Flanagan reporting for NBC Sports
- Born: Alex Wystrach; September 23, 1973 (age 53)
- Education: University of Arizona
- Occupation: Sports journalist
- Years active: 1998–present
- Spouse: Kevin Flanagan
- Children: 3
- Relatives: Mark Wystrach (brother)

Alex Flanagan (née Wystrach) (born on September 23, 1973) is the vice president of Broadcasting for the Montag Group and a former American sportscaster. She is a graduate of the University of Arizona. She began her career as a news reporter and anchor and began covering sports in 1998. She has worked for NBC Sports, NFL Network, ESPN, and Fox Sports.

== Fox Sports ==
In 1998, Bruce Fraser, a friend and former teammate of Flanagan's husband, helped her get an interview with a neighbor who worked for Fox. During the interview she met executives at Fox Sports, who had recently launched Fox Sports News (now Fox Sports Networks). Flanagan was hired as a reporter for the National Sports Report and as a producer/reporter on the Emmy-nominated weekly sports investigative magazine show Goin' Deep, hosted first by Joe Buck and later by Chris Myers. While working for "Goin' Deep," Alex was introduced to former Fox Sports anchor Keith Olbermann, whose office was next to her desk. A year or so later, Olbermann was given his own weekly show, "The Keith Olbermann Evening News." He picked Alex to be his only full-time reporter.

== ESPN ==
Flanagan left Fox Sports in 2000 for ESPN. She spent five years reporting from the college football sidelines for ESPN. First teamed with Rod Gilmore and Steve Levy on Friday night football and the trio called the Rose Bowl for ESPN Radio on Jan. 1, 2003. In 2004 she was part of ESPN2's College Football Saturday Primetime crew first teamed with Mike Tirico, then Dave Barnett, Bill Curry and Mike Golic and then with Sean McDonough and Mike Gottfried. She also served as a sideline reporter for the College World Series, the Women's Tennis Association's tour championships, NCAA men's college basketball, and the NCAA Women's basketball tournament. Flanagan worked both in the remote division and the studio for ESPN. As a reporter for SportsCenter, she frequently filed reports on the Lakers, Dodgers, Angels, UCLA, USC and the Chargers. She covered spring training, the NBA playoffs, college football bowl games, the NCAA Men's basketball tournament and did a weekly segment for NFL Monday Night Countdown. She also launched an entertainment-themed segment for SportsCenter called “Hollywood Highlights”, served as co-host of the Home Depot College Football Awards and ESPN Classic road shows.

== NFL Network and Los Angeles Chargers ==
Flanagan was hired by the NFL Network as a host and reporter in 2006. She was the network's first full-time female studio host. She covered twelve Super Bowls and hosted a variety of studio programs including NFL Total Access.

In 2008, Steve Bornstein, president and CEO of NFL Network, announced Flanagan would be part of a new two-hour Sunday morning football show called NFL GameDay Morning. Flanagan served as cohost with Spero Dedes.

In 2010, Flanagan joined play-by-play announcer Bob Papa and analysts Matt Millen and Joe Theismann when the NFL Network added her as its first sideline reporter for Thursday Night Football (TNF). She was also featured on the pre-game and post-game shows. From 2011 to 2013 she was part of the TNF broadcaster team with Play-by-Play announcer Brad Nessler and analyst Mike Mayock.

Flanagan worked for the Chargers as the team's preseason reporter with Spero Dedes and Dan Fouts. She emceed of the NFL draft for the league with Michael Irvin in 2016 and Maurice Jones-Drew during the 2017 NFL draft on Friday, April 28, 2017, in Philadelphia.

Flanagan covered the East West Shrine Bowl game and the Reeses Senior Bowl in Mobile, Alabama from 2015 to 2018 for the NFL Network. Her 2018 interview with one-handed UCF standout linebacker Shaquem Griffin during the fourth quarter of the Senior Bowl started trending after teammates and coaches interrupted him."Oh, lord!" Griffin exclaimed, before running to grab his helmet. He was supposed to be on punt team duty.

== Notre Dame Football on NBC and Football Night in America ==
Flanagan became the Sideline reporter for Notre Dame Football on NBC in 2007 while pregnant with her third child, who was born in December 2007. The Irish went 3–9 during her first year, and the following seasons, which saw Charlie Weis lose his job in 2009, again fell short of meeting expectations in South Bend. Her 2009 on-field post-game interview with an emotional UConn coach Randy Edsall remembering one of his players who had died was cited as the best interview of the weekend.

In 2009, along with Al Michaels, John Madden, and Andrea Kremer, Alex Flanagan was part of the broadcast team for Super Bowl XLIII from Tampa's Raymond James Stadium. In the final game of John Madden’s historic broadcasting career, the Pittsburgh Steelers defeat the Arizona Cardinals, 27–23, on February 1, 2009, to become the first team to win six Super Bowls. Steelers quarterback Ben Roethlisberger completed a game-winning six-yard touchdown pass to Santonio Holmes – who was named Super Bowl XLIII MVP.

In a surprise move in 2014, it was announced that NBC's Alex Flanagan would no longer be the sideline reporter for Notre Dame football games. Flanagan had roamed the South Bend sidelines for NBC since the 2007 season and also appeared on FNIA every Sunday reporting from the big NFL games of the day.

== NBC Sports Olympics and Swimming ==
Flanagan covered her first Olympic assignment for NBC in August 2008, anchoring six hours of Olympic coverage nightly on CNBC and USA Network during the Beijing Olympics. That following year, she reported from the U.S. Swimming National Championships where Michael Phelps broke the 100-meter butterfly record. She was also on deck for the 2010 Pan Pacific championships in Australia helping call the action with Rowdy Gaines and Ted Robinson and Dan Hicks.

The Rio Olympics were her fifth consecutive Games with NBC Olympics. She previously served as a reporter in Vancouver in 2010 (sports desk), London in 2012 (diving), and Sochi in 2014 (biathlon and cross-country skiing), and was a host of CNBC and USA Network coverage during the 2008 Beijing Olympics. In Rio she and Dhani Jones did a shopping story on the Rio megastore for NBC New York.

== Other notable appearances ==
=== Today Show ===
Flanagan worked as a reporter for NBC's Today Show. She did a segment called Today's Extra Yard which highlighted the charitable work of various NFL players.

=== INC.com and USA Today ===
Flanagan has written for publications and websites including USA today High school sports and INC.com. In one article she wrote about the 5 best leadership traits from Peyton Manning.

=== Bridgestone Commercial ===
Flanagan appeared in Bridgestone's ad campaign for the company's performance tires which debuted during the Winter Classic on Jan. 2, 2012. The first ad spot depicted a press conference, ostensibly at Bridgestone headquarters but actually filmed in an office park south of Los Angeles, in Irvine. In the ad an earnest chief engineer takes the stage addressing a group of media types, including NBC's Mike Milbury, ESPN's Barry Melrose, Dick Vitale and Adam Schefter, TNT's Kenny Smith, and Alex Flanagan, who was doing double duty for NFL Network and NBC.

=== Madden Most Valuable Protectors Award ===
The NFL Network's Alex Flanagan announced the New England Patriots as winners of the Madden Most Valuable Protectors Award as the year's best offensive line during the week of Super Bowl XLV in Dallas, Texas, on February 3, 2011

=== Madden NFL video games ===
Flanagan can be heard and seen in the popular video games Madden NFL 10 and Madden NFL 11, in the franchise mode. NFL Network analysts Fran Charles and Flanagan go through the week's matchups and highlights where she hosts an in-game weekly recap show called The Extra Point. The Extra Point also provided a halftime report, listing scores and statistics. Reviews called it a nice addition to the series saying the show still goes a long way toward bringing your Sunday TV experience into video game form, but could do with some fleshing out and less robotic dialogue.

=== The Alliance of American Football (AAF) ===
In 2019 Flanagan was announced as the first on-air hire for the Alliance of American Football (AAF). Flanagan was the host of the league pregame, halftime, and postgame shows with Cynthia Frelund, Rod Woodson, Terrell Davis and Marvin Lewis. The Alliance of American Football filed for Chapter 7 bankruptcy after the league folded and left many of its employees unpaid.

=== The Bowerman Presentation ===
Flanagan hosted The Bowerman Presentation in 2019 at the Grande Lakes Resort in Orlando, Florida. The Bowerman Award is considered track & field's highest honor and is given to the top collegiate male and female athlete annually.

== Personal life ==
Flanagan is a native of Sonoita, Arizona. She is married to former University of Arizona basketball player Kevin Flanagan. They have three children. Her family owns the steak restaurant, "The Steak Out" (located in Sonoita). Her brother, Mark Wystrach, is the lead singer of the country music band Midland and another brother, Mike Wystrach, founded the food delivery company Freshly.
