= I Wish You Would (MacKenzie Carpenter song) =

2025 single by MacKenzie Carpenter and Midland

Single by MacKenzie Carpenter featuring Midland

from the album Hey Country Queen
- Released: April 7, 2025
- Genre: Country
- Length: 2:53
- Label: Valory Music Co.
- Songwriters: MacKenzie Carpenter; Jonathan Hutcherson; Jamie Moore; Chris Tompkins
- Producer: Jamie Moore

Midland singles chronology
"Longneck Way to Go" (2022)	"I Wish You Would" (2025)

Music video
- "I Wish You Would" on YouTube

"I Wish You Would" is a song recorded by American country music singer-songwriter MacKenzie Carpenter featuring neotraditional country band Midland. It was written by Carpenter alongside Chris Tompkins Jonathan Hutcherson, and Jamie Moore, and was produced by Moore. The song was released on April 7, 2025, by Big Machine Records as Carpenter's debut single to country radio, and served as the lead single from Carpenter's debut studio album, Hey Country Queen. It charted on the Billboard Country Airplay chart.

== Background ==
The song captures the story of two bar patrons whose chemistry draws them together in a country dive bar. Of the song, Carpenter explained: "'I Wish You Would' is a fun, flirty tune about wanting someone to be more forward, quit guessing and make the first move. It's about craving a spark with someone and longing for more than a few glances with that person you've noticed from across the bar". She described Midland, who are her labelmates on Big Machine Records, as a dream collaboration, feeling that they bring a "smooth classic vibe" to the song. Midland lead singer Mark Wystrach stated that he loved the song from the moment it was sent to him by Carpenter and Moore, expressing that he was "thrown back in time" when recording his vocals and comparing the track to classic duets by Conway Twitty and Loretta Lynn, and Kenny Rogers and Dolly Parton. Wystrach further praised the song by stating that "the melodies are hypnotic, and the soaring hook is pure Country gold. The structure of the song is non-symmetrical, so it keeps revealing new sonic surprises leaving you wanting to hear it again and again."

== Critical reception ==
Critical reception to the song was largely positive. Jeffrey Kurtis of Today's Country Magazine stated that the song "carries a dusty barstool vibe that instantly transports your senses to the classic country sound of the 1970s, a pure country gold that matches the familiar brush of Midland's signature feels while being an intriguing departure from Mackenize's". In a review of the whole album, Nicole Piering of Country Swag described the song as an "immediate standout, a perfect dancehall duet that allows Carpenter to riff off of Midland's Mark Wystrach as they play a pair of fated lovers, unable to resist each other amongst the promises of neon lights and endless drinks".

== Music video ==
The song's official music video was released on February 18, 2025. It features Carpenter arriving at a tiki bar where Wystrach is working as a bartender. Throughout the song, they make flirtatious eye contact as she fantasizes about dancing with him, interspersed with scenes of the pair performing the song on stage. Midland's other members, Jess Carson and Cameron Duddy, appear in the video as other bartenders.

== Credits and personnel ==
Credits adapted from Tidal.

- Tom Bukovac – electric guitar
- MacKenzie Carpenter – vocals
- Brandon Hood – acoustic guitar, baritone guitar, electric guitar, engineering, programming
- David Huff – programming
- Ted Jensen – mastering
- Charlie Judge – keyboard
- Todd Lombardo – acoustic guitar
- Chris Lord-Alge – mixing
- Chris McHugh – drums
- Sean Moffitt – recording
- Jamie Moore – production
- Seth Morton – engineering, recording
- Jimmie Lee Sloas – bass
- Greyson Smith – engineering
- Mark Wystrach – vocals

== Charts ==
Chart performance for "I Wish You Would"
Chart (2025–2026)	Peak position
UK Country Airplay (Radiomonitor)	9
US Country Airplay (Billboard)	52
