= Let It Roll (Midland album) =

Studio album by Midland
- Released: August 23, 2019
- Genre: Neotraditional country
- Length: 51:39
- Label: Big Machine
- Producers: Dann Huff; Shane McAnally; Josh Osborne

Midland chronology
On the Rocks (2017)	Let It Roll (2019)	The Sonic Ranch (2021)

Singles from Let It Roll
- 1. "Mr. Lonely" Released: April 15, 2019; 2. "Cheatin' Songs" Released: January 21, 2020

Let It Roll is the second studio album by American country music group Midland. It was released on August 23, 2019 via Big Machine Records.

== Content ==
Midland released the album's lead single "Mr. Lonely" in February 2019. As with their previous album On the Rocks, the project was produced by Dann Huff, Shane McAnally, and Josh Osborne. In support of the album, the band began the Let It Roll Tour in June 2019.

== Critical reception ==
Professional ratings
Aggregate scores
Source	Rating
Metacritic	74/100
Review scores
Source	Rating
AllMusic	3.5/5 stars
Rolling Stone	3.5/5 stars

The album received a Metacritic rating of 74 based on 5 critics, indicating generally favorable reviews.

Stephen Thomas Erlewine of AllMusic rated the album 3.5 out of 5 stars, stating that " It's a record that gets by on feel, not songs, which may mean that it doesn't provide many distinguishing hooks, but it does sound awfully good as it plays." Also rating it 3.5 out of 5 stars, Jon Freeman of Rolling Stone called the album "immaculately disheveled" and noted influences of non-country artists, which he described as "a statement that the group’s fluid musical identity is a feature, not a bug."

== Commercial performance ==
Let It Roll debuted at No. 1 on Billboard' Top Country Albums with 22,000 units, 16,000 of which are traditional album sales. This is Midland's first number one on the chart. On Billboard 200, the album debuted at No. 16. The album has sold 41,300 copies in the United States as of March 2020.

== Track listing ==
No.	Title	Writer(s)	Length
1.	"Let It Roll"	Jess Carson	4:07
2.	"Fourteen Gears"	Carson; David Garza; Mark Wystrach	3:32
3.	"Mr. Lonely"	Carson; Wystrach; Cameron Duddy; Shane McAnally; Josh Osborne	3:00
4.	"Cheatin' Songs"	Carson; Wystrach; Duddy; McAnally; Osborne	3:35
5.	"Put the Hurt on Me"	Carson; Wystrach; Duddy; McAnally; Osborne	3:04
6.	"I Love You, Goodbye"	Carson; Wystrach; Duddy; McAnally; Osborne	3:08
7.	"Every Song's a Drinkin' Song"	Carson; Wystrach; Duddy; Liz Rose; Jeremy Spillman	3:56
8.	"21st Century Honky Tonk American Band"	Carson; Wystrach; Duddy; Bob DiPiero; Rhett Akins	4:38
9.	"Fast Hearts and Slow Towns"	Carson; Duddy; Marv Green; Jon Nite	3:19
10.	"Cheatin' by the Rules"	Carson; Wystrach; Duddy; DiPiero; Akins	3:41
11.	"Playboys"	Carson; Wystrach; Duddy; McAnally; Osborne	3:41
12.	"Lost in the Night"	Carson; Wystrach; Duddy; Green; J.T. Harding	2:55
13.	"Gettin' the Feel"	Carson	4:33
14.	"Roll Away"	Carson; Wystrach; Duddy; Mando Saenz	4:30
Total length:			51:39

== Personnel ==
From Let It Roll notes.

Midland

- Jess Carson - background vocals (all tracks except 14), lead vocals (14), acoustic guitar (all tracks), electric guitar (8)
- Cameron Duddy - background vocals (all tracks except 12), lead vocals (12), bass guitar (all tracks)
- Mark Wystrach - lead vocals (all tracks except 12 & 14), background vocals (12, 14), acoustic guitar (8)

Additional musicians

- Dave Cohen - piano (12, 13), Hammond B-3 organ (14), Rhodes piano (6, 12), accordion (10)
- Robbie Crowell - piano (7, 10), Hammond B-3 organ (3, 5, 6, 8, 12, 13), Wurlitzer electric piano (4), Mellotron (14), Rhodes piano (8), synthesizer (9), saxophone (12), drums (1, 2, 7–9), percussion (11), tambourine (1)
- Luke Cutchen - electric guitar (all tracks except 4 & 11)
- Paul Franklin - steel guitar (all tracks)
- Dann Huff - electric guitar (1, 2, 4–6, 9, 11, 12) acoustic guitar (2, 3), gut string guitar (5), 12-string guitar (4), slide guitar (1), mandolin (2, 4), Solina (4), bouzouki (11), sitar (1), Hammond B-3 organ (1), synthesizer (6), programming (3, 4, 8, 10), percussion (11), shaker (1)
- David Huff - programming (1–6, 8–12)
- Laur Joamets - electric guitar (1, 2, 4, 8, 9, 11), acoustic guitar (2, 9), high-strung guitar (9), acoustic slide guitar (7)
- Charlie Judge - piano (3), Hammond B-3 organ (4), Wurlitzer electric piano (11), keyboards (5)
- Rob McNelley - electric guitar (3–5, 11)
- Greg Morrow - drums (3–5, 11)
- Gordon Mote - piano (9), Hammond B-3 organ (9)
- Jerry Roe - drums (6, 10, 12–14), congas (12), tambourine (6)
- Derek Wells - electric guitar (6, 10, 12, 13)

Technical

- Adam Ayan - mastering
- Cameron Duddy - art direction
- Mike "Frog" Griffith - production coordination
- Joseph Holguin - recording assistant (1, 3–7, 8, 10–14)
- Dann Huff - producer
- David Huff - digital editing
- Steve Marcantonio - recording (all tracks except 8)
- Shane McAnally - producer
- Seth Morton - recording (all tracks except 8)
- Britt Murray - recording (9)
- Justin Niebank - mixing
- Josh Osborne - producer
- Jordan Reed - recording assistant (1, 2, 4, 5, 7, 9, 11)
- Jacob Sciba - recording (8)
- Chris Small - digital editing
- Harper Smith - photography

== Charts ==
=== Weekly charts ===
Chart (2019)	Peak position
Australian Albums (ARIA)	72
Canadian Albums (Billboard)	37
Scottish Albums (Official Charts)	6
Swiss Albums (Schweizer Hitparade)	71
UK Albums (Official Charts)	75
UK Country Albums (Official Charts)	1
US Billboard 200	16
US Top Country Albums (Billboard)	1

=== Year-end charts ===
Chart (2019)	Position
US Top Country Albums (Billboard)	81
