= Make a Little =

Single by Midland

from the album On the Rocks
- Released: September 25, 2017
- Genre: Country
- Length: 3:02
- Label: Big Machine
- Songwriters: Jess Carson; Cameron Duddy; Mark Wystrach; Shane McAnally; Josh Osborne
- Producers: Shane McAnally; Dann Huff; Josh Osborne

Midland singles chronology
"Drinkin' Problem" (2017)	"Make a Little" (2017)	"Burn Out" (2018)

"Make a Little" is a song recorded by American country music band Midland. It was released on September 25, 2017, as the second single from their debut album On the Rocks. The band members wrote the song with Josh Osborne and Shane McAnally, the latter of whom also produced it.

== Content ==
Wide Open Country describes the song as "coyly sing[ing] about sex in a way that wouldn’t make your grandma blush" It features three-part vocal harmony and pedal steel guitar accompaniment.

== Personnel ==
Adapted from On the Rocks liner notes.

- Jess Carson - acoustic guitar, background vocals
- Cameron Duddy - bass guitar, background vocals
- Paul Franklin - steel guitar
- Dann Huff - acoustic guitar, electric guitar, mandolin
- David Huff - percussion
- Charlie Judge - keyboards
- Greg Morrow - drums
- Derek Wells - electric guitar, guitar solos
- Mark Wystrach - lead vocals

== Charts ==
=== Weekly charts ===
Chart (2017–2018)	Peak position
US Bubbling Under Hot 100 (Billboard)	21
US Country Airplay (Billboard)	15
US Hot Country Songs (Billboard)	23
Canada Country (Billboard)	12

=== Year-end charts ===
Chart (2018)	Position
US Hot Country Songs (Billboard)	85

== Certifications ==
Region	Certification	Certified units/sales
United States (RIAA)	Gold	500,000^{‡}
^{‡} Sales+streaming figures based on certification alone.
