= The Last Resort (EP) =

EP by Midland
- Released: July 16, 2021
- Genre: Country, neotraditional country
- Length: 17:07
- Label: Big Machine Records
- Producer: Dann Huff; Shane McAnally; Josh Osborne

Midland chronology
The Sonic Ranch (2021)	The Last Resort (2021)	The Last Resort: Greetings From (2022)

Singles from The Last Resort
- 1. "Sunrise Tells The Story" Released: August 30, 2021

The Last Resort is the second EP released by American country music band Midland. The EP includes the singles "Sunrise Tells the Story", "And Then Some", "Take Her Off Your Hands", "Adios Cowboy" and "Two To Two Step". It was released through Big Machine Records, and produced by Dann Huff, Shane McAnally and Josh Osborne. The EP was expanded into a full album, The Last Resort: Greetings From, which was released in 2022.

== Background ==
The EP was recorded during the Coronavirus pandemic and the band has said that these songs may appear on their third studio album, that is yet to be announced. Along with the EP, Midland announced The Last Resort Tour to promote the new EP.

== Critical reception ==
The EP received generally positive reviews from critics. Mark Wiggins from Six Shooter Country gave the EP a 7 out of 10, and said that the EP seems to drift more towards mainstream and is a development in Midland's sound. James Daykin from Lyric Magazine said "we see the band experimenting with a more chilled, laid back Eagles-like vibe", and gave the EP a generally positive review.

== Track listing ==
No.	Title	Writer(s)	Length
1.	"And Then Some"	Jess Carson; Cameron Duddy; Mark Wystrach; Shane McAnally; Troy Matthew; Josh Osborne	3:26
2.	"Sunrise Tells The Story"	Carson; Jessi Alexander; Aaron Raitiere	3:28
3.	"Two to Two Step"	Carson; Duddy; Wystrach; McAnally; Osborne	3:20
4.	"Take Her Off Your Hands"	Carson; Duddy; Wystrach; Matthew; McAnally; Osborne	3:14
5.	"Adios Cowboy"	Carson; Duddy; Wystrach; Cormac O'Rourke; Marv Green; J. T. Harding	3:38

== Personnel ==
Adapted from liner notes.

=== Midland ===
- Jess Carson - acoustic guitar, background vocals
- Cameron Duddy - bass guitar, background vocals
- Mark Wystrach - lead vocals

=== Additional Musicians ===
- Dave Cohen - mellotron, piano, synthesizer
- Robbie Crowell - Hammond B-3 organ, keyboards, synthesizer
- Luke Cutchen - electric guitar
- Paul Franklin - steel guitar
- Dann Huff - acoustic guitar, electric guitar
- David Huff - programming
- Evan Hutchings - programming
- Laur Joamets - electric guitar
- Cormac O'Rourke - electric guitar
- Charlie Judge - Hammond B-3 organ, keyboards, synthesizer, synthesizer bass
- Rob McNelley - electric guitar
- Greg Morrow - drums, percussion
- Justin Niebank - programming
- Ben Phillips - programming
- Ilya Toshinsky - acoustic guitar
