= Burn Out (Midland song) =

Single by Midland

from the album On the Rocks
- Released: April 9, 2018
- Genre: Country
- Length: 3:09
- Label: Big Machine
- Songwriter(s): Jess Carson; Cameron Duddy; Mark Wystrach; Shane McAnally; Josh Osborne
- Producer(s): Josh Osborne; Shane McAnally; Dann Huff

Midland singles chronology
"Make a Little" (2017)	"Burn Out" (2018)	"Mr. Lonely" (2019)

"Burn Out" is a song recorded by American country music band Midland. It is the third single from their 2017 debut album On the Rocks. The band's three members, Mark Wystrach, Cameron Duddy, and Jess Carson, co-wrote the song with Shane McAnally and Josh Osborne, the latter two of whom co-produced it with Dann Huff.

== Content ==
The song is about a male narrator watching a relationship "burn out", comparing it to a cigarette burning itself out. Lead singer Mark Wystrach told the blog Taste of Country that he sees the song as a prequel to their 2017 debut single "Drinkin' Problem", saying that "Burn Out" is "very much in the same landscape. It could tell the story of how the character in 'Drinkin' Problem' could get to that place, as usually is the case through heartache". He also feels that the song draws inspiration from Dean Dillon and Gary Stewart, while also noting the group's prominent vocal harmonies.

== Music video ==
Directed by TK McKamy, the video was filmed in one single take at the nightclub Billy Bob's Texas in Fort Worth, Texas. Wystrach said that the video, which features him rescuing a female bar patron from a rude customer, takes inspiration from the 1980 movie Urban Cowboy, which itself was filmed partially at Billy Bob's. Live version was directed by Roger Pistole and premiered on CMT, GAC & Vevo in 2018.

== Personnel ==
From On the Rocks liner notes.

Musicians

- Jess Carson – acoustic guitar, background vocals
- Cameron Duddy – bass guitar, background vocals
- Paul Franklin – steel guitar
- Dann Huff – acoustic guitar, electric guitar
- Charlie Judge – keyboards
- Greg Morrow – drums
- Derek Wells – electric guitar
- Mark Wystrach – lead vocals

Technical

- Dann Huff – producer
- David Huff – digital editing
- Steve Marcantonio – recording
- Shane McAnally – producer
- Andrew Mendelson – mastering
- Justin Niebank – mixing
- Josh Osborne – producer
- Chris Small – digital editing

== Charts ==
=== Weekly charts ===
Chart (2018–2019)	Peak position
Canada Country (Billboard)	29
US Billboard Hot 100	63
US Country Airplay (Billboard)	3
US Hot Country Songs (Billboard)	11

=== Year-end charts ===
Chart (2018)	Position
US Hot Country Songs (Billboard)	79
Chart (2019)	Position
US Country Airplay (Billboard)	42
US Hot Country Songs (Billboard)	61

== Certifications ==
Region	Certification	Certified units/sales
United States (RIAA)	Platinum	1,000,000^{‡}
^{‡} Sales+streaming figures based on certification alone.
