= List of people from Long Beach, California =

The following notable people were born in, residents of, or otherwise closely associated with the city of Long Beach, California.

== Sports ==
- Luis Aguilar: soccer player
- Greta Andersen: 1948 Olympic swimming gold medalist, and long-distance swimmer, originally from Denmark
- Alan Ashby: former professional baseball catcher
- Quinton Bell: National Football League (NFL) player
- Ken Block: professional rally driver, co-founder of DC Shoes
- Milton Bradley: Major League Baseball (MLB) player
- Tiny Broadwick: pioneering female parachutist
- Antoine Cason: NFL player
- Lynne Cox: long-distance open-water swimmer and writer
- J. P. Crawford:MLB player
- Travis d'Arnaud: MLB player
- Lisa Fernandez: three-time Olympic softball gold medalist
- Landry Fields: former National Basketball Association (NBA) player and currently the general manager of the Atlanta Hawks
- Bobby Grich: MLB player
- Chris Gwynn: MLB player
- Tony Gwynn: Hall of Fame baseball player
- Sara Hughes: beach volleyball player
- Jason Kapono: NBA player
- Terry Kennedy: skateboarder
- Billie Jean King: tennis Grand Slam winner
- Doug Krikorian: sportswriter
- Jason Leffler: NASCAR driver
- Tammy Leibl: beach volleyball player
- Bob Lemon: baseball player and manager, Baseball Hall of Fame inductee
- Ed Lytle: MLB player
- Joe Maddon: MLB manager
- McKayla Maroney: artistic gymnast
- Misty May-Treanor: professional beach volleyball player, Olympic gold medalist
- James McDonald: MLB player
- Willie McGinest: NFL player, three-time Super Bowl champion
- Tommy Nance: MLB pitcher
- Matt Nieto: ice hockey player
- Marquez Pope: NFL figure
- Beans Reardon: MLB umpire
- Charles Roberts: CFL running back
- Brian Scalabrine: NBA player
- Matt Treanor: MLB player
- Justin Turner: MLB third baseman
- Chase Utley: MLB player
- Carl Weathers: football player and actor
- Russell Westbrook: NBA player
- Jacob Wiley: Israeli Basketball Premier League player
- Christian Wood: NBA player

== Entertainment ==
- Millicent Borges Accardi: writer, National Endowment for the Arts award for poetry
- Russell Allen: member of progressive metal band Symphony X
- Richard Bach: author of Jonathan Livingston Seagull
- Bad Azz: hip hop artist
- J Boog: American Samoan reggae singer
- Jan Burke: mystery author, 2000 Edgar Award for Best Novel (for Bones)
- Nicolas Cage: actor
- George Chakiris: Academy Award-winning actor
- Dick Christie: actor
- Nat King Cole: singer and jazz piano player
- Helios Creed: guitarist and singer
- Shane Dawson: YouTuber, actor, filmmaker, writer, and musician
- Tray Deee: rapper from Tha Eastsidaz
- Bo Derek: actress
- Scott Devours: drummer and songwriter
- Cameron Diaz: actress
- Nate Dogg: rapper, songwriter, and singer
- Snoop Dogg: songwriter, actor, and rapper
- Domino: rapper
- The Dove Shack (consisting of rappers C-Knight, Bo-Roc and 2Scoops): G-funk/hip hop group
- Melissa Etheridge: rock singer
- Kayla Ewell: actress
- Paloma Ford: R&B singer
- Warren G: songwriter and rapper
- Giveon: singer and songwriter
- Allie Goertz: musician and writer
- Goldie Loc: rapper from Tha Eastsidaz
- Isidora Goreshter: actress
- half•alive (consisting of musicians Josh Taylor, Brett Kramer, and J. Tyler Johnson): indie pop band
- Jeff Hanneman: Slayer guitarist
- Ricky Harris: actor and producer
- Donna Hilbert: poet
- James Hilton: author, wrote 1937 novel Lost Horizon
- John Lee Hooker: blues singer
- Marilyn Horne: opera singer
- Thelma Houston: R&B singer
- Gabriel Iglesias: stand-up comedian
- Robert Irwin: artist
- Kap G: Mexican-American rapper
- Sally Kellerman: actress
- DeForest Kelley: Star Trek actor
- Greg Laswell: musician
- Vicki Lawrence: comedian and actress
- LBC Crew (consisting of rappers Bad Azz, Lil' C-Style, and Techniec)
- Laurie Lewis: singer and musician
- Camryn Manheim: actress
- Andy Martin: jazz trombonist
- Jennette McCurdy: former actress; author
- Wendi McLendon-Covey: actress
- Robert Mitchum: actor
- Ericson Alexander Molano: gospel singer
- Manny Montana: actor
- Bradley Nowell: lead singer and guitarist for the band Sublime
- Frank Ocean: singer, songwriter, and rapper
- Frances O'Connor: sideshow performer, without arms
- Ikey Owens: keyboardist of The Mars Volta
- Paulina Peavy: artist, inventor, painter, designer, sculptor, poet, writer, and lecturer
- Yolanda Pérez: singer-songwriter
- Rival Sons: rock band
- Jenni Rivera: singer, television personality
- Lupillo Rivera: Mexican-American singer and songwriter
- Peggy Ryan: dancer and actress
- Upton Sinclair: author
- Dylan and Cole Sprouse: actors, The Suite Life on Deck
- Vince Staples: rapper
- Michael Stuhlbarg: actor
- Norma Tanega: folksinger-songwriter
- Tay-K: rapper and convicted murderer
- Scout Taylor-Compton: actress
- Tiffani Thiessen: actress
- Twinz: rappers
- Mike Vallely: skateboarder, musician with Black Flag
- Brooks Wackerman: musician, songwriter and drummer
- Maitland Ward: actress
- Sandy West: singer and drummer
- Adrian Young: musician, songwriter and drummer

== Other ==
- Elizabeth Milbank Anderson: philanthropist and advocate for public health and women's education; her house is now the Long Beach Museum of Art
- Charlie Beck: retired LAPD chief
- Jacqueline Bishop: artist
- Bob Brogoitti: Oregon state legislator, born in Long Beach
- Dorothy Buffum Chandler: Los Angeles philanthropist (wife of Norman Chandler, publisher of the Los Angeles Times) and namesake of the Dorothy Chandler Pavilion
- Bayless Conley: televangelist
- Douglas "Wrong Way" Corrigan: flew unauthorized "wrong way" flight from New York to Ireland
- William John Cox: public interest attorney, author and political activist
- George Deukmejian: governor of California, 1983–1991
- Lon Milo DuQuette: writer
- Tarek El Moussa: real estate investor and television personality
- John Mack Faragher: American historian and author
- Robert Garcia: U.S. representative; former mayor of Long Beach and Long Beach city councillor
- Tyler Haney, founder of Outdoor Voices
- Edwin J. Hill: Medal of Honor recipient
- Jesse James: custom motorcycle and car builder, West Coast Choppers and Monster Garage
- Long Gone John: entrepreneur, owner and CEO of Sympathy for the Record Industry
- Paula Jones: civil servant
- Isaac C. Kidd: Medal of Honor recipient
- Charleen Kinser: toy designer
- Randy Kraft: serial killer
- Greg Laurie: televangelist
- Richard H. Leigh: four-star admiral
- Annabel Parlett McMillin: First Lady of Guam
- Frank Merriam: governor of California, 1934–1939
- Opie Ortiz: artist
- William F. Prisk: California state senator, editor-publisher of Long Beach Press-Telegram
- Mark Ragins: psychiatrist in the recovery movement, founding member of the Village ISA
- Julio Salgado: Mexican artist
- San Kim Sean: martial artist
- Elizabeth Short (aka "The Black Dahlia"): murder victim (originally from Boston, Massachusetts)
- Christopher Tyng: television composer
- Meredith Thompson: law enforcement special agent
- Matt Welch: blogger and journalist
- Grace Olive Wiley: herpetologist best known for her work with venomous snakes

== See also ==
- List of mayors of Long Beach
