= On the Rocks (Midland album) =

Studio album by Midland
- Released: September 22, 2017
- Genre: Neotraditional country
- Length: 45:26
- Label: Big Machine
- Producers: Josh Osborne; Shane McAnally; Dann Huff

Midland chronology
Midland (2016)	On the Rocks (2017)	Let It Roll (2019)

Singles from On the Rocks
- 1. "Drinkin' Problem" Released: February 27, 2017; 2. "Make a Little" Released: September 25, 2017; 3. "Burn Out" Released: April 9, 2018

On the Rocks is the debut studio album by American country music band Midland. It was released on September 22, 2017, via Big Machine Records. In 2019, it was certified gold by the RIAA for sales of 500,000.

== Content ==
The album features 13 songs, featuring the singles "Drinkin' Problem", "Make a Little", and "Burn Out". All songs written by band members on album. Josh Osborne, Shane McAnally, and Dann Huff served as producers.

== Critical reception ==
AllMusic reviewer Stephen Thomas Erlewine rated the album 4 out of 5 stars, comparing its sound favorably to Alabama and Dwight Yoakam. He also stated that "the three members construct sturdy songs with a shimmering surface to match." Chris Richards of The Washington Post described the album as "the year's best country album". Exclaim! writer Marlo Ashley gave the album a 9 out of 10, comparing "Lonely For You Only" to Sonny James. She also called the album "charming".

== Commercial performance ==
The album debuted at No. 2 on the Top Country Albums chart, selling 17,000 copies (20,000 units including streams and tracks) in the first week. It has sold 112,500 copies in the United States as of March 2019. In November 2019 it was certified Gold by RIAA for selling 500,000 units.

== Track listing ==
No.	Title	Writer(s)	Length
1.	"Lonely for You Only"	Jess Carson, Cameron Duddy, Mark Wystrach, Rhett Akins, Josh Osborne	3:51
2.	"Make a Little"	Carson, Duddy, Wystrach, Shane McAnally, Osborne	3:02
3.	"Drinkin' Problem"	Carson, Duddy, Wystrach, McAnally, Osborne	3:41
4.	"At Least You Cried"	Carson, Duddy, Wystrach, Jonathan Singleton	2:39
5.	"Burn Out"	Carson, Duddy, Wystrach, McAnally, Osborne	3:10
6.	"Out of Sight"	Carson, Duddy, Wystrach, Luke Laird, McAnally	4:23
7.	"More Than a Fever"	Carson, Duddy, Wystrach, McAnally, Osborne	3:43
8.	"Check Cashin' Country"	Carson	3:50
9.	"Nothin' New Under the Neon"	Carson, Duddy, Wystrach, McAnally, Osborne	3:47
10.	"This Old Heart"	Carson, Wystrach, David Lee Murphy, Singleton	3:14
11.	"Altitude Adjustment"	Carson, Duddy, Wystrach, Akins, Rodney Clawson	3:27
12.	"Electric Rodeo"	Carson, Duddy, Wystrach, McAnally, Osborne	3:20
13.	"Somewhere on the Wind"	Carson, Duddy, Wystrach, Akins, Osborne	3:20

== Personnel ==
Adapted from On the Rocks liner notes.

Midland

- Jess Carson - acoustic guitar (all tracks), background vocals (all tracks)
- Cameron Duddy - bass guitar (all tracks), background vocals (all tracks)
- Mark Wystrach - lead vocals (all tracks)

Additional musicians

- Vinnie Ciesielski - trumpet (track 4)
- Dan Dugmore - steel guitar (tracks 3, 8, 9, 12)
- Ian Fitchuk - piano (tracks 3, 9)
- Paul Franklin - steel guitar (tracks 1–7, 9–11, 13), steel guitar solo (track 3)
- Dann Huff - acoustic guitar (tracks 2, 5, 7, 8, 10, 12), electric guitar (all tracks except 12), guitar solo (tracks 6, 8, 9), gut string guitar (track 1), 12-string acoustic guitar (track 3), wire choir guitar solo (track 10), high-strung guitar (track 12), ganjo (track 13), mandolin (tracks 2, 8), Hammond B-3 organ (track 3)
- David Huff - tambourine (track 1), percussion (tracks 2, 6, 7, 13)
- Charlie Judge - accordion (track 13), keyboards (tracks 1, 2, 4–13)
- Rob McNelley - electric guitar (tracks 9, 12)
- Gordon Mote - piano (track 10)
- Greg Morrow - drums (all tracks), percussion (track 7)
- Danny Rader - acoustic guitar (track 3), mandolin (track 3), bouzouki (track 3)
- Mickey Raphael - echo harp (track 7), harmonica (track 13)
- Ilya Toshinsky - acoustic guitar (track 12)
- Derek Wells - electric guitar (except track 12), guitar solo (tracks 2, 11, 12), 12-string electric guitar (track 12), baritone guitar (track 12)

Technical

- Ryan Gore - recording (track 9)
- Dann Huff - producer
- David Huff - digital editing (except track 3)
- Steve Marcontonio - recording (except track 3)
- Shane McAnally - producer
- Andrew Mendelson - mastering
- Seth Morton - recording (track 3)
- Sean Neff - digital editing (track 3)
- Justin Niebank - recording (track 3), mixing
- Josh Osborne - producer
- Chris Small - digital editing (except track 3)

== Charts ==
=== Weekly charts ===
Chart (2017–18)	Peak position
Canadian Albums (Billboard)	45
Swiss Albums (Schweizer Hitparade)	82
UK Country Albums (Official Charts)	8
US Billboard 200	20
US Top Country Albums (Billboard)	2

=== Year-end charts ===
Chart (2017)	Position
US Top Country Albums (Billboard)	85
Chart (2018)	Position
US Top Country Albums (Billboard)	66
Chart (2019)	Position
US Top Country Albums (Billboard)	69

=== Singles ===
Year	Single	Peak positions					Sales	Certifications
Year	Single	US Country	US Country Airplay	US	CAN	CAN Country	Sales	Certifications
2017	"Drinkin' Problem"	4	3	45	98	1	US: 401,000	RIAA: Gold
2017	"Make a Little"	23	15	— (Note: "Make a Little" did not enter the Hot 100, but peaked at number 21 on Bubbling Under Hot 100 Singles, which acts as a 25-song extension of the Hot 100.)	—	12		
2018	"Burn Out"	11	3	63	—	36		

== Certifications ==
Certifications for On the Rocks
Region	Certification	Certified units/sales
United States (RIAA)	Gold	500,000^{‡}
^{‡} Sales+streaming figures based on certification alone.
