= Mr. Lonely (Midland song) =

Single by Midland

from the album Let It Roll
- Released: April 15, 2019
- Genre: Country
- Length: 3:00
- Label: Big Machine
- Songwriter(s): Mark Wystrach; Jess Carson; Cameron Duddy; Josh Osborne; Shane McAnally
- Producer(s): Josh Osborne; Shane McAnally; Dann Huff

Midland singles chronology
"Burn Out" (2018)	"Mr. Lonely" (2019)	"Cheatin' Songs" (2020)

"Mr. Lonely" is a song performed by the American country music band Midland. It is the lead single to their second studio album Let It Roll. The band wrote the song with Josh Osborne and Shane McAnally.

== Content and history ==
Band members Mark Wystrach, Jess Carson, and Cameron Duddy wrote the song with Shane McAnally and Josh Osborne, both of whom co-produced the recording with Dann Huff. Midland's road band guitarist Luke Cutchen plays lead guitar, and session musician Paul Franklin contributes on pedal steel guitar.

Marissa R. Moss of Rolling Stone Country described the song as " a mischievous, Texas dance hall-inspired tune in the spirit of Eddie Rabbitt" and "a tongue-in-cheek ode to embracing the role of the being someone’s late-night phone call when their other date went south." Taste of Country writer Jacklyn Krol said of the song that "The beat is retro country, but the song's lyric about a charming rogue trying to hook up with other men's women is relevant to any period" and called it an "uptempo country hall dance tune".

== Music video ==
Duddy directed the song's music video, which features Dennis Quaid portraying a protagonist who is attacked by a number of women while Midland performs the song.

== Chart performance ==
=== Weekly charts ===
Chart (2019)	Peak position
Canada Country (Billboard)	32
US Country Airplay (Billboard)	23
US Hot Country Songs (Billboard)	31

=== Year-end charts ===
Chart (2019)	Position
US Hot Country Songs (Billboard)	80
