= Are Your Eyes Still Blue =

Single by Shane McAnally

from the album Shane McAnally
- B-side: "If It's Over"
- Released: August 17, 1999
- Genre: Country
- Length: 3:45
- Label: Curb
- Songwriters: Shane McAnally; Julie Wood; Steve Mandile
- Producer: Rich Herring

Shane McAnally singles chronology
"Say Anything" (1999)	"Are Your Eyes Still Blue" (1999)	"Run Away" (2000)

"Are Your Eyes Still Blue" is a song co-written and recorded by American country music singer Shane McAnally. It is the second single from his only studio album, Shane McAnally. He wrote the song with Julie Wood and Steve Mandile, the latter of whom would later become a member of the band Sixwire.

== Content ==
Thematically, the song is about "a man still intrigued by his old flame and the transformation that has taken place since their parting." Throughout, the male narrator questions his former lover with "Are your eyes still blue?" The song consists of two verses, a chorus which is sung three times, and a bridge. It begins in the key of F major, then modulates upward by a whole-step at each chorus, ending in B major. It is in 2/2 or cut time with an approximate tempo of 84 half-notes per minute. Prominent mandolin and fiddle are heard throughout.

== Critical reception ==
An uncredited review in Billboard was favorable, saying that "His sophomore single is an appealing uptempo number with a decidedly more country flavor. Production is crisp and flatters McAnally's energetic performance." Country Standard Time writer Dan McIntosh, in a review of the album, wrote that it "nicely melds fiddle and mandolin into what comes off as a sort of modern day bluegrass plucker."

== Personnel ==
From Shane McAnally liner notes.

- Dan Dugmore – acoustic guitar, steel guitar
- Lori D. Hall – background vocals
- Tony Harrell – piano
- Rich Herring – acoustic guitar, background vocals
- Michael Lusk – background vocals
- Brent Rowan – electric guitar
- Wanda Vick – fiddle, mandolin
- Mel Watts – drums
- Glenn Worf – bass guitar

== Chart performance ==
Chart (1999)	Peak position
Canada Country Singles (RPM)	47
US Hot Country Songs (Billboard)	31
