= Shane McAnally (album) =

Studio album by Shane McAnally
- Released: October 24, 2000
- Genre: Country
- Length: 42:46
- Label: Curb
- Producer: Brian Ahern; Mark Bright; Rich Herring

Shane McAnally chronology
Runaway (EP) (2000)	Shane McAnally (2000)

Shane McAnally is the only studio album by American country music singer Shane McAnally, released on October 24, 2000, via Curb Records. The album includes the singles "Say Anything", "Are Your Eyes Still Blue", and "Run Away".

== Critical reception ==
Dan McIntosh of Country Standard Time gave the album a mixed review, criticizing McAnally's "average" voice and the "routine-sounding production" while praising McAnally's "original and witty ideas". He also referred to "Are Your Eyes Still Blue" as a "sort of modern day bluegrass plucker." A review from Billboard was mixed, stating that the album "alternates between '70s -era pop/schlock and endearing contemporary country". The review praised "It Comes and Goes" and "You Ain't Seen Nothing Yet" and praised McAnally's "appealing" voice, but felt that some of the songs had weak lyrics.

== Track listing ==
No.	Title	Writer(s)	Length
1.	"Run Away"	Blair Daly; Rich Herring; Shane McAnally	3:44
2.	"Say Anything"	Herring; McAnally	3:10
3.	"Are Your Eyes Still Blue"	Steve Mandile; McAnally; Julie Wood	4:16
4.	"The Definition of Love"	Cindy Bullens; Jess Leary	2:44
5.	"It Comes and Goes"	Herring; McAnally	3:45
6.	"I Remember You"	Herring; McAnally	3:56
7.	"Little Imperfections"	Kent Blazy; Daly; McAnally	3:33
8.	"You Ain't Seen Nothin' Yet"	Herring; McAnally	2:51
9.	"Wait 'Til I Get My Hands on You"	Herring; McAnally	2:50
10.	"I Could Have Told You That"	McAnally; Jon McElroy; Pebe Sebert	2:44
11.	"Just One Touch"	McAnally	3:12
12.	"If It's Over"	Herring; McAnally	6:01

== Personnel ==
- Richard Bennett – acoustic guitar
- Jim Brown – piano, organ
- Penny Cardin – background vocals
- Chad Cromwell – drums
- Rusty Danmyer – steel guitar, lap steel guitar
- Chip Davis – background vocals
- Dan Dugmore – acoustic guitar, steel guitar
- John Foster – background vocals
- Larry Franklin – fiddle
- Paul Franklin – steel guitar
- Michael Gregory – electric guitar
- Chris Griffin – loops
- Lori D. Hall – background vocals
- John Hammond – drums
- Tony Harrell – piano, keyboards, organ, Wurlitzer
- Rich Herring – acoustic guitar, electric guitar, gut string guitar, "lap loop", background vocals
- Dann Huff – electric guitar
- Andy Hull – drums
- David Hungate – bass guitar
- Kim Keyes – background vocals
- Tim Lauer – organ, keyboards
- B. James Lowry – acoustic guitar, electric guitar
- Mark Luna – background vocals
- Michael Lusk – background vocals
- Mac McAnally – acoustic guitar
- Greg Morrow – drums
- Duncan Mullins – bass guitar
- Steve Nathan – piano
- Marcia Ramierz – background vocals
- Michael Rhodes – bass guitar
- Ryan Ricks – percussion, background vocals
- Brent Rowan – electric guitar
- Sunny Russ – background vocals
- John Wesley Ryles – background vocals
- Brian D. Siewert – keyboards, piano, strings
- Stephony Smith – background vocals
- Steuart Smith – electric guitar
- Wanda Vick – fiddle, mandolin
- Mel Watts – drums, percussion
- Glenn Worf – bass guitar
- Andrea Zonn – fiddle

All tracks produced by Rich Herring; tracks 2 and 4 co-produced by Mark Bright; tracks 6, 8, 10–12 co-produced by Brian Ahern.

== Singles ==
Year	Single	Chart Positions	
Year	Single	US Country	CAN Country
1999	"Say Anything"	41	46
1999	"Are Your Eyes Still Blue"	31	47
2000	"Run Away"	50	57
