= Drinkin' Problem =

Single by Midland

from the album On the Rocks
- Released: February 27, 2017
- Genre: Country
- Length: 3:41
- Label: Big Machine
- Songwriters: Mark Wystrach; Cameron Duddy; Jess Carson; Shane McAnally; Josh Osborne
- Producers: Shane McAnally; Dann Huff; Josh Osborne

Midland singles chronology
"Drinkin' Problem" (2017)	"Make a Little" (2017)

"Drinkin' Problem" is the debut single of the American country music band Midland. It was released on February 27, 2017, as the first single from their debut album On the Rocks. The band members wrote the song with Josh Osborne and Shane McAnally, both of whom produced it with Dann Huff. It was also covered by the Hawaiian band Ekolu in 2019 as part of their 20 Year Anniversary Timeless album.

== Critical reception ==
Taste of Country reviewed the song with favor, saying that "The trio’s 'Drinkin’ Problem' keeps the pretty of old-school country swing but dives dark into sorrow with no shame."

== Commercial performance ==
"Drinkin' Problem" was certified Gold by the RIAA on August 16, 2017, and Platinum on January 18, 2019, double Platinum on September 10, 2019, and six-times platinum on June 11, 2026.

== Music video ==
The song's music video, directed by group member Cameron Duddy, was shot in Lockhart, Texas. It features the band selling moonshine.

== Personnel ==
Adapted from On the Rocks liner notes.

- Jess Carson - acoustic guitar, background vocals
- Dan Dugmore - steel guitar
- Cameron Duddy - bass guitar, background vocals
- Ian Fitchuk - piano
- Paul Franklin - steel guitar solo
- Dann Huff - electric guitar, 12-string guitar, Hammond B-3 organ
- Greg Morrow - drums
- Danny Rader - acoustic guitar, mandolin, bouzouki
- Derek Wells - electric guitar
- Mark Wystrach - lead vocals

== Charts ==
Chart (2017)	Peak position
Canada Hot 100 (Billboard)	98
Canada Country (Billboard)	1
US Billboard Hot 100	45
US Country Airplay (Billboard)	3
US Hot Country Songs (Billboard)	4

=== Year-end charts ===
Chart (2017)	Position
Canada Country (Billboard)	12
US Country Airplay (Billboard)	14
US Hot Country Songs (Billboard)	15

== Certifications ==
Region	Certification	Certified units/sales
Canada (Music Canada)	Platinum	80,000^{‡}
New Zealand (RMNZ)	Gold	15,000^{‡}
United States (RIAA)	6× Platinum	6,000,000^{‡}
^{‡} Sales+streaming figures based on certification alone.
