= Outdoor Voices =

American clothing company

- Type: Private
- Industry: Fashion
- Founded: 2013; 13 years ago in New York City, U.S.
- Founders: Tyler Haney; Matt McIntyre
- Headquarters: Austin, Texas, United States
- Products: Athletic apparel; Activewear
- Owner: Consortium Brand Partners
- Website: outdoorvoices.com

Outdoor Voices (O.V.) is an American clothing company focused on the design and sale of athletic apparel. It was cofounded in 2013 by Tyler Haney and Matt McIntyre in New York City, and is now headquartered in Austin.

== History ==
Outdoor Voices was cofounded in 2013 by Tyler Haney and Matt McIntyre in New York City. Tyler Haney, was motivated to found Outdoor Voices due to a love of sports and athletics. She cofounded Outdoor Voices in 2013 with Matt McIntyre after the two met while studying at Parsons School of Design; McIntyre left the company in 2014.

In early 2014, J. Crew selected the Outdoor Voices line for its stores’ "Brands We Love" sections after the line was featured in a London boutique, Garbstore. Its first store opened in Austin in October 2014 and its first pop-up shop opened in Manhattan in 2015. The company was known initially for their "kits," which included a collection of tops and bottoms that could be mixed and matched for a bundled price.

Over time, Outdoor Voices raised over $9.5 million from investors like General Catalyst Partners. In 2015, Outdoor Voices received $7.5 million in investments to start their active apparel line. In 2016, Haney decided to move the company to Austin, Texas to focus on building a new and a bigger headquarters for the company and hired more employees including some of Haney's friends from high school. Mickey Drexler, the former CEO of Gap Inc. and J. Crew Group, Inc., became the company's chairman of the board in the summer of 2017. As of March 2018, the company had raised roughly $57 million in funding. Lead investors include GV, General Catalyst Partners, and Forerunner Ventures. On April 24, 2018, Outdoor Voices launched a running collection with Hoka One One. They also released a corresponding app called O.V. Trail Shop. The app features the nearest Trail Shops where the new running collection can be found. In 2018, Outdoor Voices launched their first swimwear collection called “H2Ov”.

Outdoor Voices has collaborated with other clothing and exercise-related companies to produce limited run products. Collaborators include the fashion blog Man Repeller, ClassPass, and French fashion label A.P.C.

In February 2020, in an effort to restructure the company, Tyler Haney stepped down as CEO. Several executives abruptly departed the company, and an anonymous letter blamed Haney for the staff exits, calling her "spoiled" and criticizing her leadership. Haney struggled to work with Mickey Drexler, the well-known retail executive who had previously led J.Crew and Gap. By March 2020, the company had "imploded," according to The New York Times. In January 2020, the company's valuation was $40 million, down from its 2018 valuation of $110 million. Outdoor Voices indicated that there would be an additional 15 layoffs across the company.

In March 2024, the company announced all its stores would close, and that the company would become online-only. On March 21, former employees confirmed that Outdoor Voices was preparing to file for Chapter 11 bankruptcy reorganization within the coming weeks.
