= Freshly =

American food delivery company

Freshly, Inc.
- Company type: Defunct
- Industry: Food delivery
- Founded: 2012; 13 years ago
- Defunct: January 2023; 2 years ago
- Headquarters: New York, New York, United States
- Key people: Michael Wystrach; Carter Comstock
- Parent: Nestlé

Freshly was a New York City-based convenience food delivery company that delivered throughout the contiguous United States. It was acquired by Nestlé in October 2020 and was shut down in January 2023.

The company delivered one million meals per week. Meals were able to be heated by microwave or oven without preparation. Freshly also donated excess ingredients and meals to local food banks as a part of its partnership with Feeding America.

== History ==
Freshly was founded by Michael Wystrach and Carter Comstock in 2012. Wystrach sought to lose weight after a decline in his health following years working in the financial field. His family operated a restaurant, The Steak Out in Sonoita, Arizona, and he and a family friend, emergency room doctor Frank Comstock, helped prepare nutritious meals for delivery. After word of mouth spread, Frank's son, Carter Comstock, founded the company with Wystrach. Wystrach was influenced by 4-H program initiatives and adopted minimal food waste and sustainability into Freshly's menus.

In July 2015, the company raised a $7 million Series A round. In July 2016, the company raised $21 million in a funding round led by Insight Partners.

In February 2017, the company announced plans to open a meal distribution center in Savage, Maryland and the creation of 500 jobs.

In June 2017, the company raised $77 million in a funding round led by Nestlé.

In 2020, Freshly expanded to business-to-business food delivery, including to workers in essential services.

In October 2020, Freshly was acquired by Nestlé for US$950 million plus up to another US$550 million in earn out payments.

In December 2020, the company launched a service to cater to active living styles and low-carb, high protein diets.

In February 2021, Freshly announced a new 134,000 square-foot distribution center in Austell, Georgia. In July 2022, the company closed this distribution center.

In August 2022, the company announced a service focused on delivering meals to businesses.

In December 2022, the company closed its distribution center in Savage, Maryland, laying off 454 people.

In January 2023, Freshly ceased operations.

In May 2023, former investors of Freshly sued Nestlé for failing to make earn-out payments.
