= Tyler Haney =

American entrepreneur (born 1988/89)

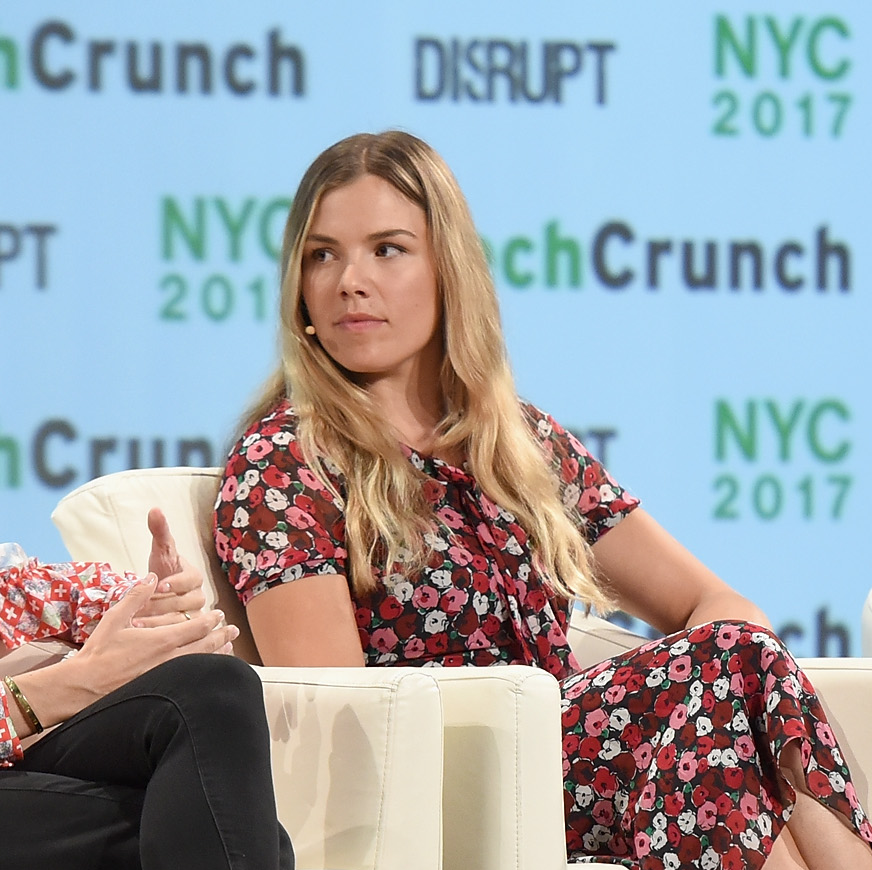
- Haney on a panel at TechCrunch in 2017.
- Born: 1988 or 1989 (age 37–38)
- Education: Parsons School of Design
- Known for: Outdoor Voices
- Spouse: Mark Wystrach
- Children: 2

Tyler Haney is an American entrepreneur. She cofounded athletic wear company Outdoor Voices in 2013.

== Early life and education ==
Tyler Haney was born in Long Beach, California, where her mother, Jenn, was a hair stylist and her father, Bob, worked on an oil rig. She was the eldest of three siblings. The family moved to Boulder, Colorado. Haney was athletic as a child and ran track in high school. She altered vintage clothing for her own wear.

While in Boulder, Haney's parents started separate businesses, her mother a sportswear brand called Fresh Produce which she started with her twin sister, and her father a screen-printing and embroidery company. Haney worked in her father's shop part-time and created her own screen-printed designs, but didn't consider going into either family business.

After graduating from high school, she moved to Boston, where she waited tables, and then to New York, where she also worked in food service. She attended the Parsons School of Design, studying business, and worked at a fashion incubator. She began experimenting with the idea of a style uniform for herself of a cropped white t-shirt and A-line skirt, and had what she called an epiphany about the clothing she was working out in, saying that on a run, she suddenly felt the workout clothing she was wearing emphasized performance over enjoyment of physical activity and wondered whether an athletic wear brand could "free fitness from performance" and "approach exercise with moderation, humor, ease, and delight".

After graduating from Parsons in 2012 she announced on Tumblr a plan to start an activewear brand and blog about the experience.

== Career ==
Haney cofounded Outdoor Voices in 2013 with fellow Parsons student Matt McIntyre. The company worked with a mill to developed an athletic wear fabric that was "textured and matte, rather than shiny and slick" as the typical athletic wear fabrics were. The company's first designs were "recreation kits" consisting of a cropped compression top, compression leggings, hoodie, t-shirt, and joggers made from the fabric. Haney gave kits to friends to "go out and do things in"; the brand's hashtag is #Doing Things. McIntyre left the company in 2014.

Haney moved to Los Angeles, where she found a factory to produce a small run of the kits, and took samples to a Las Vegas trade show, where she received a small order from a London boutique owner. A buyer for J. Crew visited the London boutique and placed an order for 11,000 units. Haney moved back to New York and started seeking investors. She struggled at first in convincing the mostly-male investment capitalists until she began sending kits to their wives and girlfriends ahead of scheduled meetings.

According to the New York Times, Outdoor Voices "helped to popularize a fitness paradigm that has more to do with everyday movement than the body-stressing athleticism advertised by brands like Nike". Designs for apparel items like exercise dresses supported marketing that branded the items as all-day wear that encouraged wearers to be ready for any opportunity to be physically active, rather than focussing on athletic performance. BuzzFeed reported their marketing as 'more “bike trip to the farmer’s market with your girl gang” than “sprint on the track until you collapse” '.

The brand was popular on social media with the hashtag #DoingThings. Haney left Outdoor Voices in February 2020 amid company growing pains, the strain of a headquarters move from New York to Austin, investors questioning her leadership, and employee complaints about workplace culture. She rejoined in April 2020 as a board member, and left again in January 2021. The company declared bankruptcy in March 2024 and closed its eleven bricks-and-mortar retail outlets; it was acquired by Consortium Brand Partners in June 2024.

In 2022 Haney started a cannabis supplement brand, Joggy, and created a web platform for web3, Try Your Best. Haney's vision for Try Your Best is to "enable brands to collect input from customers in exchange for rewards such as digital collectibles (NFTs) and brand coins that can be used for bragging rights or toward purchases" aimed at Millennial and Gen-Z consumers and brands marketing to those cohorts. Haney referenced the amount advertisers spend on social media to attract customers to help small brands and startups reduce such costs.

== Personal life ==
In July 2019 Haney announced she was pregnant with her first child. In October 2019 she married Mark Wystrach and in November 2019 she had their first child, a girl, by emergency c-section. In December 2021 the couple had their second child, a boy.
