= Midland (band) =

American country music group

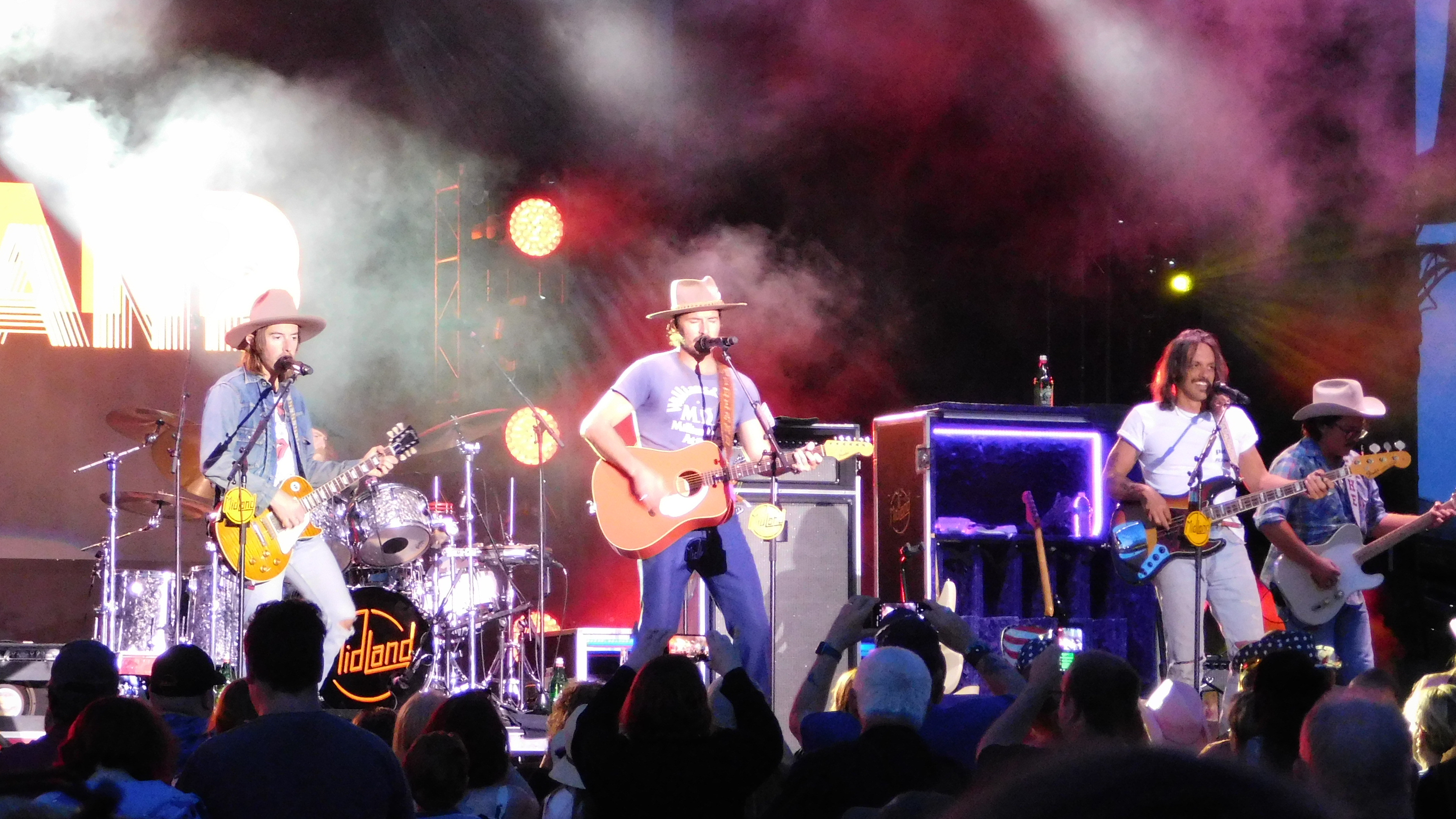
- Midland at the New York State Fair in 2019

Background information
- Origin: Dripping Springs, Texas, U.S.
- Genre: Neotraditional country
- Years active: 2014–present
- Label: Big Machine
- Members: Mark Wystrach; Jess Carson; Cameron Duddy
- Website: midlandofficial.com

Midland is an American country music group formed in 2014 in Dripping Springs, Texas. The group members are Mark Wystrach (lead vocals, guitar), Jess Carson (guitar, vocals), and Cameron Duddy (bass guitar, vocals). Through Big Machine Records, the band has released two EPs, their self-titled EP and The Last Resort. They have released five albums, On the Rocks, Let It Roll, The Last Resort: Greetings From, Barely Blue and Stages, and seven of their singles have entered the Billboard country chart: "Drinkin' Problem", "Burn Out", "Make a Little", "Mr. Lonely", "Cheatin' Songs", "Sunrise Tells the Story" and "Longneck Way to Go". Midland’s sound is described as neotraditional country.

== History ==
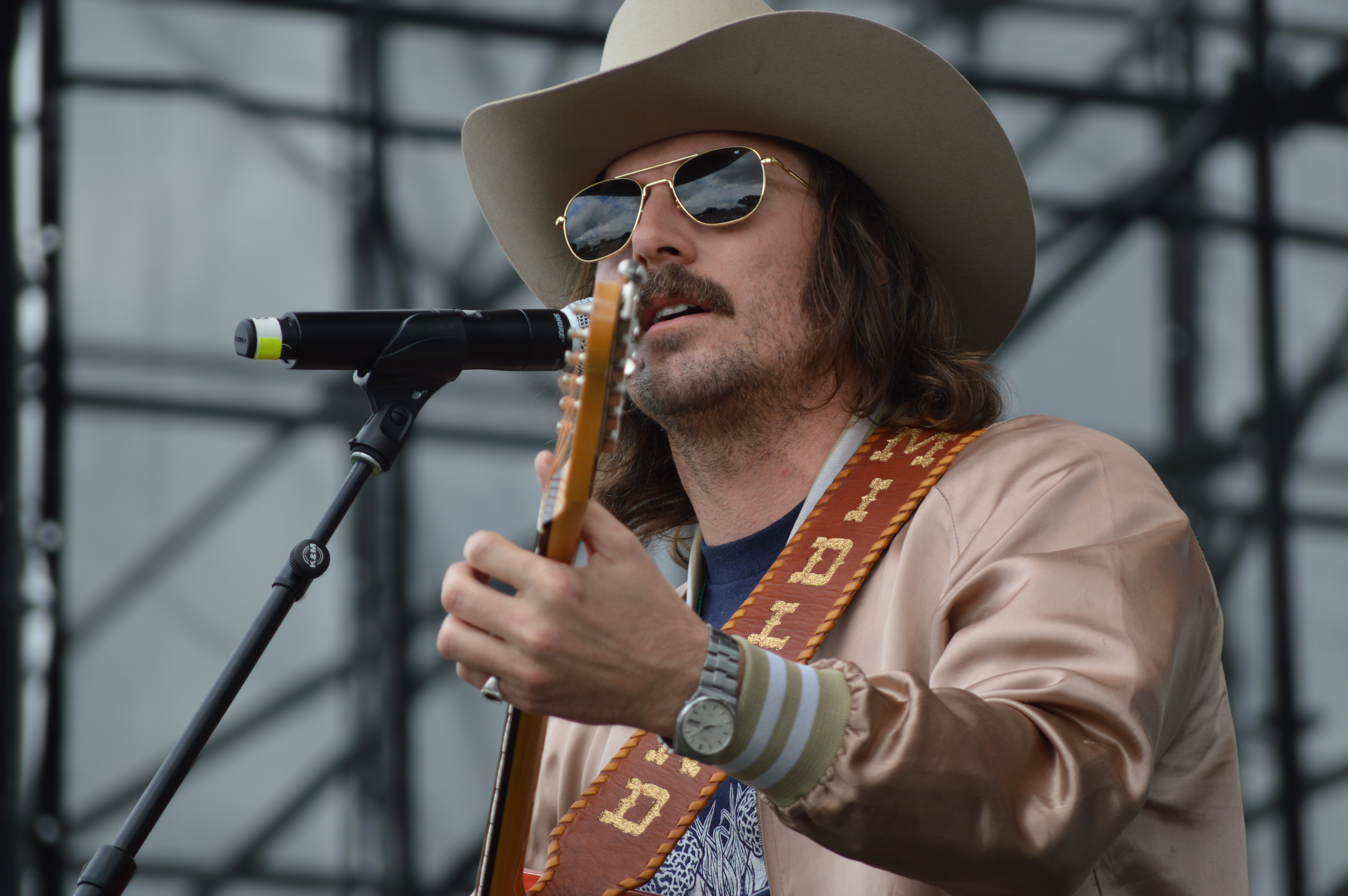
Mark Wystrach in 2018

The trio that was to become the band Midland met separately around Los Angeles, where Jess Carson and Cameron Duddy were in a number of bands through a number of years. After Carson left L.A., Duddy and Mark Wystrach met and formed a country-rock band called The Young Whiskey. The trio met up in Jackson Hole, Wyoming, for Cameron Duddy's wedding in August 2013; both Wystrach and Carson acted as groomsmen. As Duddy recalls the story, Carson and Wystrach arrived in Jackson Hole for the wedding a week early. After playing songs together on the front porch of Carson's cabin, they proposed starting a project together. Six months later, in January 2014, Duddy called Carson and Wystrach to suggest that they record some songs, and they went to the Sonic Ranch recording studio in El Paso, Texas to record for 10 days. As stated by Mark Wystrach, "when we went to the Sonic Ranch, we became a band. We walked away believing in what had happened." Wystrach and Duddy then both moved with their families to Texas where Jess Carson lived. They named the band after a song by Dwight Yoakam that was called "Fair to Midland".

Mark Wystrach grew up surrounded by music, as his parents were both fans of live music. His parents owned a honky tonk country music venue. In addition to being a lead singer, frontman Wystrach is also an actor and model. Wystrach was signed to IMG Models.

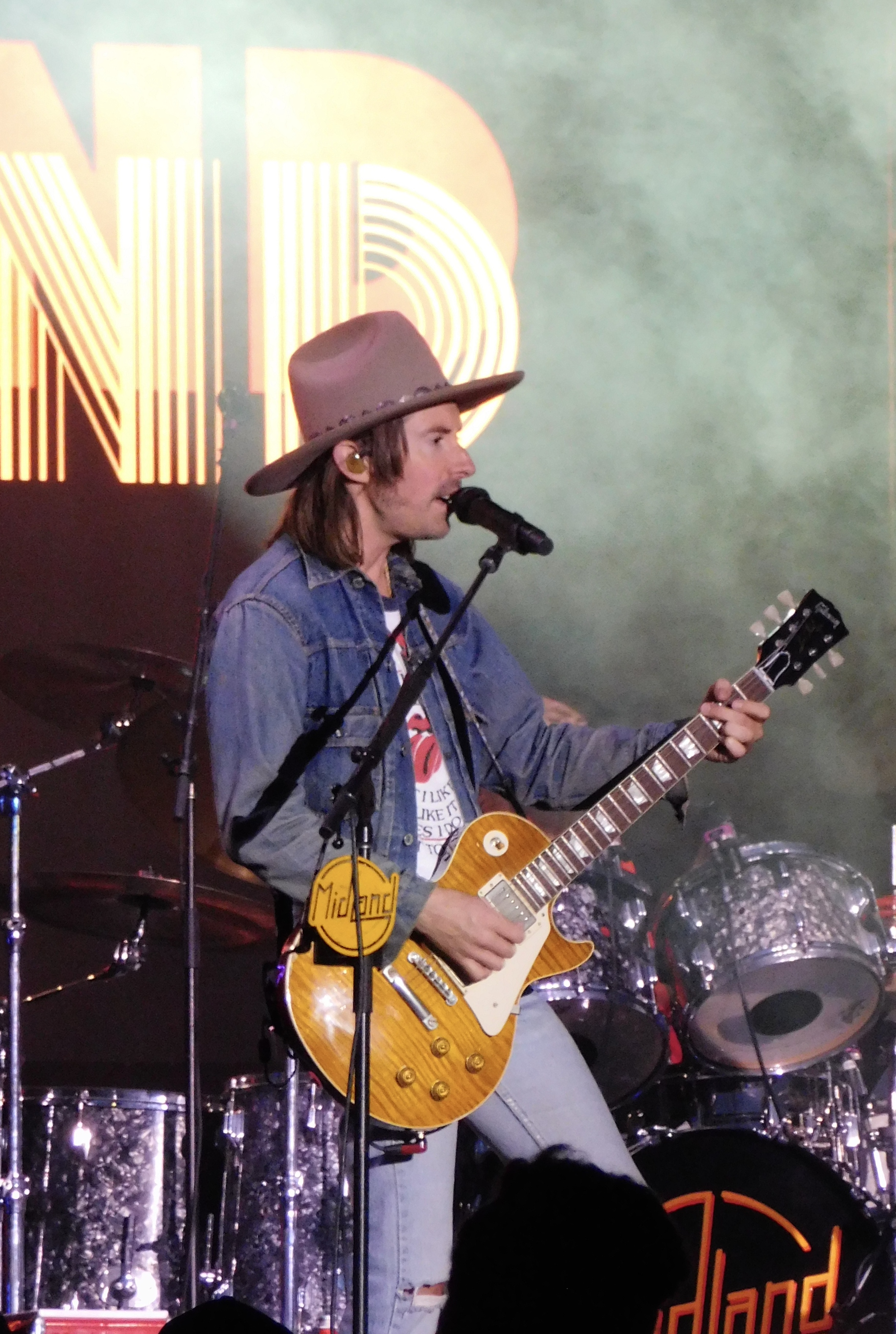
Jess Carson in 2019

Jess Carson grew up on a small farm in Oregon where the main genre was country music. His sister and father were musicians, so he started playing guitar, singing and writing songs.

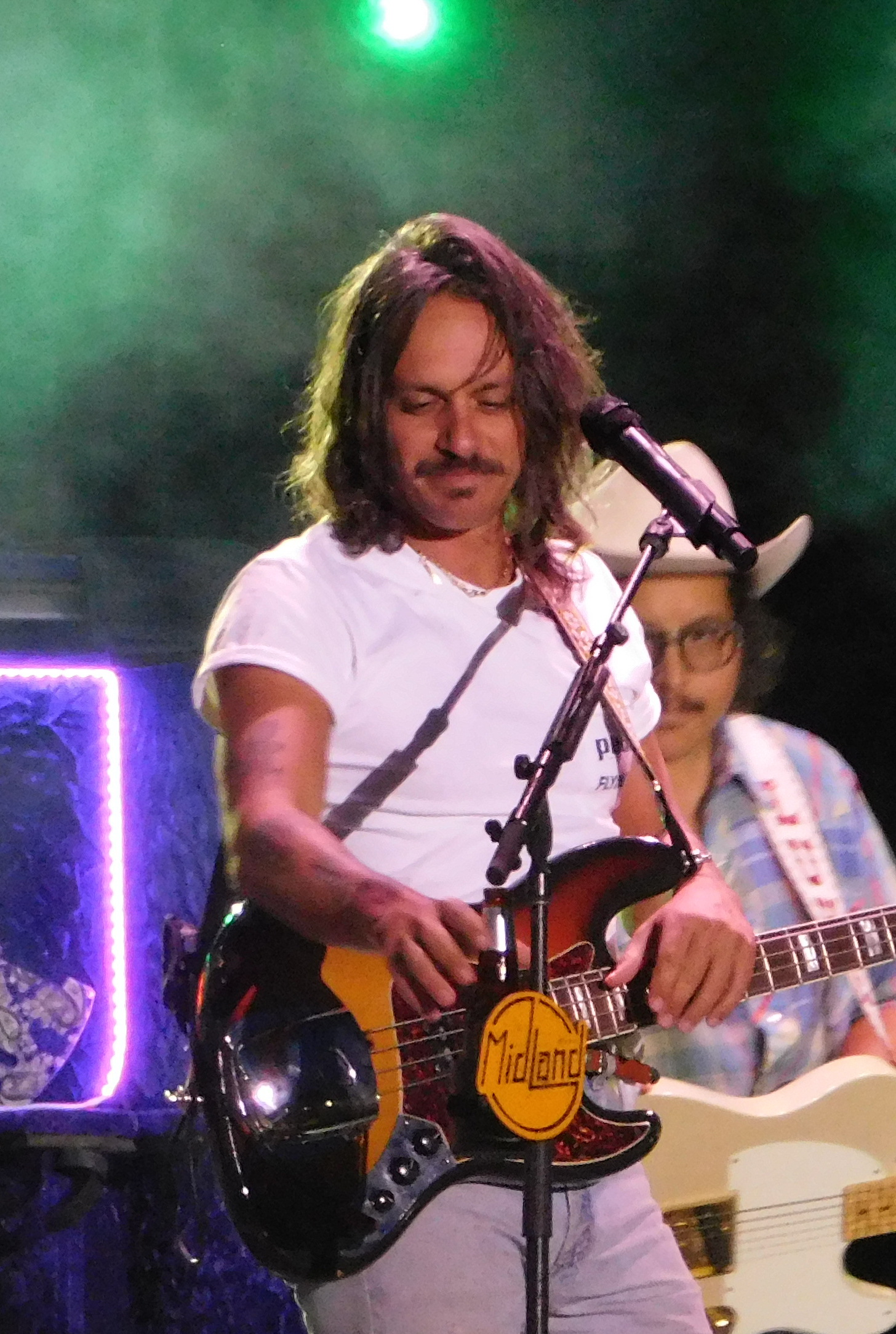
Cameron Duddy in 2019

Cameron Duddy started playing music after a difficult situation in his family; he found that music helped to lessen the tension, saying, "Sometimes you don't get to talk about all the things that you maybe want to talk about and the ice breaker started to be music." Duddy got his first guitar from his father; it helped him to find his identity for becoming a musician.

Duddy is also a music video director; he won an MTV Video Music Award for "Locked Out of Heaven" by artist Bruno Mars. He has directed over 20 music videos in his career, working with several top artist.

Midland's first song, "Fourteen Gears", came out around 2015. The song, according to Duddy, was "another one of the early moments that defined and solidified the band."

=== 2016–present ===
On March 9, 2016, the trio signed to Big Machine Records and released the Midland EP featuring their debut single, "Drinkin' Problem", which charted on Billboard's Hot Country Songs and Country Airplay. The band wrote the song with Shane McAnally and Josh Osborne, the former of whom also produced it. Duddy directed the song's music video. Their debut album On the Rocks was released in September 22, 2017, produced by Dann Huff, Josh Osborne, Shane McAnally. Midland released "Make a Little" as the second single. "Burn Out" as the third single and it was released in late 2018.

Midland was nominated for two Grammy Awards in 2018: Grammy Award for Best Country Song and Grammy Award for Best Country Duo/Group Performance, both for "Drinkin’ Problem". Midland won at the 2018 ACM Awards for best New Vocal Group of the year. Midland released the single "Mr. Lonely" in February 2019 as the leadoff single to their second album. Midland released "Cheatin' Songs" in August of 2019 as the second single to the album. The album, Let It Roll, was released on August 23, 2019. The band began a tour in June in support of the album. In 2019 Midland's first album On the Rocks was certified Gold by the RIAA.

In February of 2020 Midland launched three new expressions of their own tequila, called "insõlito". In March 2021, Midland released an album titled The Sonic Ranch, which served as the soundtrack for the documentary film on their origin story, focusing on their first recording session at The Sonic Ranch in 2014. On July 16, 2021, Midland released their latest EP, The Last Resort, which hit Number 47 on the Billboard Album Sales Chart. The band followed the EP with their third studio album titled The Last Resort: Greetings From, released on May 6, 2022. They released "Sunrise Tells the Story" as the first single, and "Longneck Way to Go" with Jon Pardi as the second single in late 2022.

Midland released their fourth studio album on September 20, 2024 titled Barely Blue, the album consist of eight songs and was produced by Grammy Award winner Dave Cobb. Rolling Stone rated Barely Blue one of the top 30 best country and Americana albums of 2024. Vulture.com listed the title track "Lucky Sometimes" as one of the best songs of 2024. Midland also released their new cigar line, called the Palomino Longneck, in a special collaboration with Kingsmakers Cigars in September 2024.

In 2025 Midland was featured on the duet song "I Wish You Would", with "Mackenzie Carpenter".

Midland released the single "Marlboro Man" on January 16, 2026. They released their second single to their upcoming fifth studio album late 2026 called "Shooting Memories With Tequila". The band released the album Stages on June 12, 2026, through Blue Highway Records.

== Band members ==
- Mark Wystrach – lead vocals, guitar
- Jess Carson – rhythm guitar, vocals
- Cameron Duddy – bass guitar, vocals

Touring musicians

- Luke Cutchen – lead guitar
- Phillip Sterk – steel guitar, harmonica
- Nat Copeland – fiddle
- John Wood – drums
- Carson Cody – organ, piano

Past touring musicians

- Jeff Adamczyk – organ, piano
- Robbie Crowell – drums

== Style and influences ==
Rolling Stone said that "the Texas-based band blend their voices to produce country music that recalls a mix of George Strait, Urban Cowboy and Seventies yacht rock." Billboard describes the band's sound as "a definite George Strait '80s New Traditionalist feel to it, combined with the rich California harmonies that made The Eagles legendary." Midland also is known for their unique dressing style, very similar to the original "Nudie suits" designed by Nudie Cohn. Vogue called Midland both heartthrobs and fashion risk takers."

== Discography ==
=== Studio albums ===
Title	Album details	Peak chart positions						Sales	Certifications
Title	Album details	US	US Country	AUS	CAN	UK	UK Country	Sales	Certifications
On the Rocks	Release date: September 22, 2017; Label: Big Machine	20	2	—	45	—	8	US: 112,500	RIAA: Gold
Let It Roll	Release date: August 23, 2019; Label: Big Machine	16	1	72	37	75	1	US: 41,300	
The Last Resort: Greetings From	Release date: May 6, 2022; Label: Big Machine	—	37	—	—	—	1		
Barely Blue	Release date: September 20, 2024; Label: Big Machine	—	—	—	—	—	10		
Stages	Release date: June 12, 2026; Label: Blue Highway	—	—	—	—	—	—		
"—" denotes releases that did not chart

=== Live albums ===
Title	Album details
Live from the Palomino	Release date: February 28, 2020; Label: Big Machine

=== Soundtrack albums ===
Title	Album details
The Sonic Ranch	Release date: March 19, 2021; Label: Big Machine

=== Extended plays ===
Title	EP details	Peak chart positions		Sales
Title	EP details	US Country	US Heat	Sales
Midland	Release date: October 28, 2016; Label: Big Machine	38	18	US: 19,500
The Last Resort	Release date: July 16, 2021; Label: Big Machine	—	—	
"—" denotes releases that did not chart

=== Singles ===
Year	Title	Peak chart positions					Sales	Certifications	Album
Year	Title	US	US Country	US Country Airplay	CAN	CAN Country	Sales	Certifications	Album
2017	"Drinkin' Problem"	45	4	3	98	1	US: 452,000	RIAA: 6× Platinum; MC: Platinum; RMNZ: Gold	On the Rocks
2017	"Make a Little"	— (Note: "Make a Little" did not enter the Hot 100, but peaked at number 21 on Bubbling Under Hot 100, which acts as a 25-song extension of the Hot 100.)	23	15	—	12		RIAA: Gold	On the Rocks
2018	"Burn Out"	63	11	3	—	29	US: 82,000	RIAA: Platinum	On the Rocks
2019	"Mr. Lonely"	—	31	23	—	32			Let It Roll
2020	"Cheatin' Songs"	—	41	26	—	48		RIAA: Gold	Let It Roll
2021	"Sunrise Tells the Story"	—	—	42	—	—			The Last Resort: Greetings From
2022	"Longneck Way to Go" (with Jon Pardi)	—	—	52	—	—			The Last Resort: Greetings From
2025	"I Wish You Would" (Mackenzie Carpenter featuring Midland)	—	—	52	—	—			Hey Country Queen
"—" denotes releases that did not chart

=== Music videos ===
Year	Video	Director
2017	"Drinkin' Problem"	Cameron Duddy
2017	"Make a Little"	Cameron Duddy
2018	"Burn Out"	TK McKamy
2019	"Mr. Lonely"	Cameron Duddy
2022	"Sunrise Tells the Story"	Cameron Duddy and Harper Duddy
2022	"Longneck Way to Go"	Harper Smith

=== Other appearances ===
Year	Song	Artist	Album
2019	"Boot Scootin' Boogie"	Brooks & Dunn	Reboot
2020	"Redneck Girl"	Tim McGraw	McGraw Machine Hits: 2013–2019

== Awards and nominations ==
Year	Award	Category	Recipient/Work	Result	Ref
2017	CMT Music Awards	Group Video of the Year	"Drinkin’ Problem"	Nominated	
2018	Country Music Association Awards	New Artist of the Year	Midland	Nominated	
2018	Country Music Association Awards	Vocal Group of the Year	Midland	Nominated	
2018	Country Music Association Awards	Single of the Year	"Drinkin' Problem"	Nominated	
2018	Grammy Awards	Best Country Duo/Group Performance	"Drinkin' Problem"	Nominated	
2018	Grammy Awards	Best Country Song	"Drinkin' Problem"	Nominated	
2018	ACM Awards	New Vocal Duo or Group of the Year	Midland	Won	
2018	ACM Awards	Vocal Group of the Year	Midland	Nominated	
2018	ACM Awards	Single Record of the Year	"Drinkin' Problem"	Nominated	
2019	CMT Music Awards	Group Video of the Year	"Burn Out"	Nominated	
2019	Country Music Association Awards	New Artist of the Year	Midland	Nominated	
2019	Country Music Association Awards	Vocal Group of the Year	Midland	Nominated	
2020	Country Music Association Awards	Vocal Group of the Year	Midland	Nominated	
