= Shane McAnally =

American musician and songwriter (born 1974)

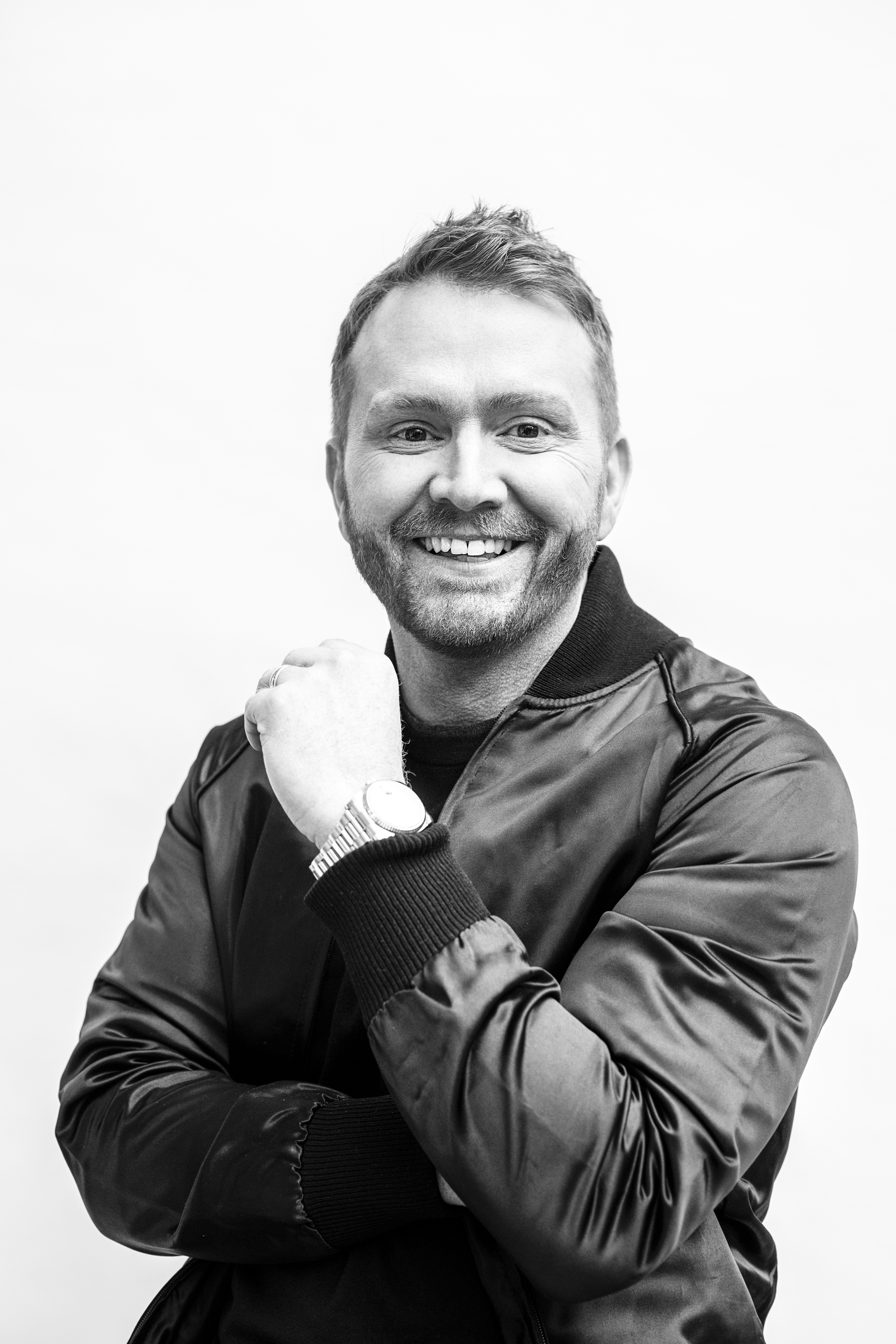
- McAnally in 2019

Background information
- Also known as: Shane Mack
- Born: Shane Lamar McAnally; October 12, 1974 (age 51)
- Origin: Mineral Wells, Texas, United States
- Genres: Country
- Occupations: Singer; songwriter; record producer
- Years active: 1986–2000; 2005–present
- Label: Curb
- Spouse: Michael Baum (m. 2017)

Shane Lamar McAnally (born October 12, 1974) is an American country music singer, songwriter, and record producer. He debuted as a singer in 1999 with his self-titled album on Curb Records. This project produced three singles on the Billboard Hot Country Songs charts, including "Are Your Eyes Still Blue".

After a hiatus from music, McAnally returned to songwriting, having his first major success with "Last Call" by Lee Ann Womack in 2008. From the early 2010s onward, McAnally has worked almost exclusively as a songwriter and producer. Artists with whom he has worked include Old Dominion, Midland, and Kacey Musgraves. He has won four Grammy Awards and multiple awards from the Country Music Association (CMA). In 2023, he collaborated with Brandy Clark in writing the musical Shucked.

== Musical career ==
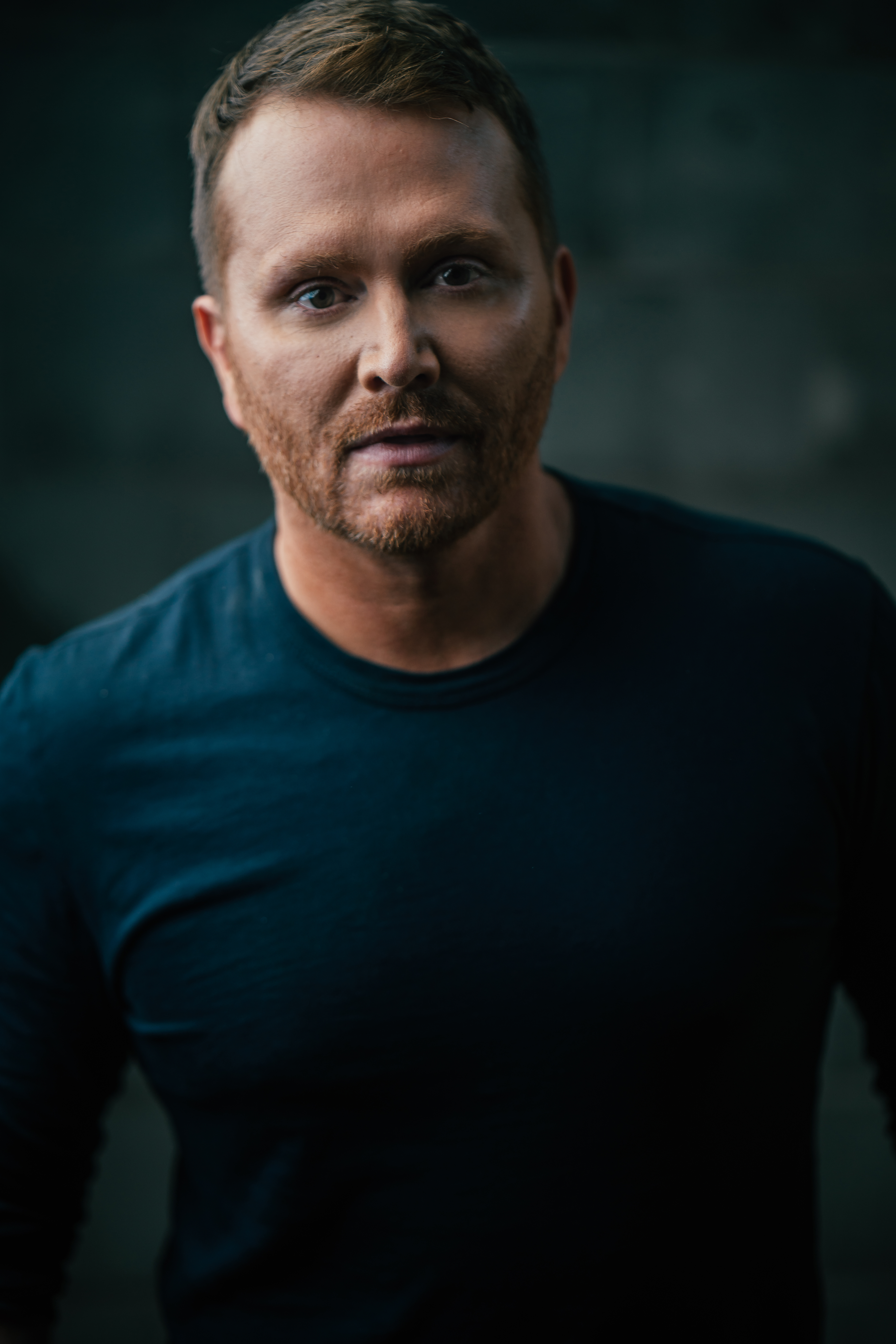
McAnally in 2017

Shane Lamar McAnally was born October 12, 1974, in Mineral Wells, Texas. He began performing at local clubs at the age of 12 and appeared on Star Search when he was 14, singing Dan Hill's "Sometimes When We Touch." He moved to Branson, Missouri at 15, then to Nashville at 19.

McAnally and music producer Rich Herring recorded a demo of a song that McAnally had written. The song, "Just One Touch", earned McAnally a publishing deal as well as a recording contract with Curb Records. In 1999, McAnally signed with Curb and began recording his first album for the label as well as his first single. "Say Anything" was released in 1999 as his debut single. The song peaked at No. 41 on the US Billboard Hot Country Songs chart. The follow-up single, "Are Your Eyes Still Blue", became his only top 40 single as a singer, peaking at No. 31. McAnally charted a third and final time with "Run Away", which reached No. 50. All three tracks appeared on a self-titled debut album released on Curb in 2000 before he left the label.

=== Songwriting ===
In 2001, McAnally moved to Los Angeles. He composed six songs for the soundtrack of 2007 independent film Shelter, credited as Shane Mack.

Returning to Nashville in late 2007, McAnally began writing songs for other artists, starting with "Last Call", released by Lee Ann Womack in 2008. From this point onward, McAnally has been primarily known for his songwriting work. He has also worked as a record producer, for artists such as Kacey Musgraves, Old Dominion, and Midland.

He has written and produced songs for Walker Hayes, Kacey Musgraves, Kelly Clarkson, Sam Hunt, Kenny Chesney, Reba McEntire, Jake Owen, Luke Bryan, The Band Perry, Lady A, Keith Urban, Thomas Rhett, Brothers Osborne, Old Dominion, Dierks Bentley, Miranda Lambert, Kelsea Ballerini, Midland, and more. The Academy of Country Music named him Songwriter of the Year in 2014. He also won "Best Country Album" and "Best Country Song" at the 2014 Grammy Awards for his work on Kacey Musgraves's Same Trailer Different Park. In 2015, Billboard named him the Hot Country Songwriter of the Year as well as a Billboard Power Player. McAnally joined industry veteran Jason Owen in early 2017 to relaunch Monument Records as co-presidents. McAnally stars as one of the on-screen talent producers in the NBC television reality series Songland. In 2019, McAnally won the ACM Award for Songwriter of the Year and Grammy Award for Best Country Song for co-writing Kacey Musgraves's "Space Cowboy." Most recently, he was named as one of Billboard's 2020 Country Power Players and chosen as the recipient of the 2020 Billboard Trailblazer Award, held only by previous winners Reba McEntire and Florida Georgia Line.

McAnally received a nomination for the Grammy Award for Songwriter of the Year, Non-Classical at the 66th Annual Grammy Awards for his work on songs by Brandy Clark, Walker Hayes, Lauren Daigle, Old Dominion, Alex Newell, Niall Horan, Sam Hunt, Carly Pearce, and Chris Stapleton, as well as a nomination for Best Musical Theater Album for his work on Shucked.

== Personal life ==
McAnally told Yahoo! Entertainment in 2020 that he struggled with his sexuality for many years while working in Nashville, as he knew that no country music singers were openly gay at the time. At the time, he was dating a woman to whom he later came out, although he kept his orientation hidden from others and later referred to his girlfriend as a "beard". After exiting Curb in 2000, McAnally decided to come out while living in West Hollywood, California, a city he knew was more accepting of the gay community. He worked songwriter shows there and chose to return to Nashville due to his enjoyment of music. McAnally received attention as a gay musician in 2013 when he co-wrote and co-produced "Follow Your Arrow" by Kacey Musgraves, a song which features a lyric in support of the gay community.

McAnally married his partner of five years, Michael Baum, in September 2012. The couple have three children. In January 2017, the two were legally married by Nashville Mayor Megan Barry.

== Discography and videography ==
Title	Details
Shane McAnally	Release date: October 24, 2000; Label: Curb; Formats: CD, cassette

=== Singles ===
Year	Single	Peak chart positions		Album
Year	Single	US Country	CAN Country	Album
1999	"Say Anything"	41	46	Shane McAnally
1999	"Are Your Eyes Still Blue"	31	47	Shane McAnally
2000	"Run Away"	50	57	Shane McAnally
"—" denotes releases that did not chart

=== Music videos ===
Year	Video	Director
1999	"Say Anything"	Chris Rogers
2008	"Lie To Me" (as Shane Mack)	

== Producing discography ==
McAnally has produced or co-produced the following works:

Year	Artist	Type	Project
2013	Kelly Clarkson	Track	"Tie It Up"
2013	Kacey Musgraves	Album	Same Trailer Different Park
2014	Sam Hunt	Album	Montevallo
2014	Old Dominion	Track	"Dirt on a Road"
2014	Old Dominion	EP	Old Dominion EP
2015	Kacey Musgraves	Album	Pageant Material
2015	Kacey Musgraves	Track	"A Spoonful of Sugar"
2015	Old Dominion	Album	Meat and Candy
2015	Jake Owen	Track	"Real Life"
2016	Midland	EP	Midland EP
2016	Jake Owen	Album	American Love
2016	Artists of Then, Now & Forever	Single	"Forever Country"
2017	Candi Carpenter	Single	"Burn the Bed"
2017	Walker Hayes	Album	boom.
2017	Midland	Album	On the Rocks
2017	Old Dominion	Album	Happy Endings
2018	Walker Hayes	Single	"90's Country"
2018	Little Big Town	Single	"Summer Fever"
2018	Old Dominion	Single	"Make It Sweet"
2018	Teddy Robb	Single	"Lead Me On"
2018	Brandon Ratcliff	Single	"Rules of Breaking Up"
2019	Aloe Blacc	Track	"Same Blood"
2019	Walker Hayes	Single	"Don't Let Her"
2019	John Legend	Single	"We Need Love (from Songland)"
2019	Midland	Single	"Mr. Lonely"
2019	Brandon Ratcliff	Track	"Number in My Phone"
2019	Teddy Robb	Track	"Tell Me How"
2019	Teddy Robb	Single	"Really Shouldn't Drink Around You"
2019	Old Dominion	Album	Old Dominion
2020	Kelsea Ballerini	Single	"The Other Girl" (with Halsey)
2020	Walker Hayes	Single	"Trash My Heart"
2020	Lady Antebellum	Single	"Champagne Night" (From Songland)
2020	Kylie Morgan	Single	"Break Things"
2020	Kylie Morgan feat. Walker Hayes	Track	"Cuss a Little"
2020	Carly Pearce	Single	"Next Girl"
2020	Old Dominion	Tracks	Old Dominion: Band Behind the Curtain
2020	Brandon Ratcliff	EP	"Sometimes Always Never"
2020	Teddy Robb	EP	Teddy Robb - EP
2021	Walker Hayes	EP	Country Stuff
2021	Midland	EP	The Last Resort
2021	Kylie Morgan	Track	Love, Kylie
2021	Old Dominion	Album	Time, Tequila & Therapy
2021	Old Dominion	Track	"All I Know About Girls"
2021	Old Dominion	Track	"Hawaii"
2021	Old Dominion	Single	"I Was on a Boat That Day"
2021	Carly Pearce	Album	29: Written in Stone
2021	Carly Pearce	EP	29
2021	Carly Pearce	Track	"Dear Miss Loretta"
2021	Carly Pearce and Ashley McBryde	Single	"Never Wanted to Be That Girl"
2021	Tigirlily	Track	"My Thang"
2021	Tigirlily	EP	Tigirlily EP
2022	Walker Hayes	Track	"Drinking Songs"
2022	Walker Hayes	Track	"AA"
2022	Walker Hayes	Track	"Life With You"
2022	Walker Hayes	Track	"Delorean"
2022	Walker Hayes	Track	"Fancy Like"
2022	Walker Hayes	Track	"Country Stuff" (featuring Jake Owen)
2022	Walker Hayes	Track	"I Hope You Miss Me"
2022	Walker Hayes	Track	"Briefcase" (featuring Lori McKenna)
2022	Walker Hayes	Track	"Make You Cry"
2022	Walker Hayes	Track	"What If We Did" (featuring Carly Pearce)
2022	Sam Hunt	Track	"Water Under The Bridge"
2022	Midland	Album	"The Last Resort: Greetings From"
2022	Midland	Track	"Longneck Way To Go"
2022	Midland	Track	"The Last Resort"
2022	Kylie Morgan	Track	"Independent With You"
2022	Kylie Morgan	Track	"Love Like We're Drunk"
2022	Carly Pearce and Ashley McBryde	Track	"Never Wanted to Be That Girl" (Acoustic)
2022	Kelly Clarkson, Dolly Parton	Track	"9 To 5 (From The Still Working 9 To 5 Documentary)"
2022	Kelsea Ballerini	Album	SUBJECT TO CHANGE
2023
2023	Sam Hunt	Single	"Start Nowhere"
2023	Old Dominion	EP	Memory Lane (Sampler) EP
2023	Carly Pearce, Chris Stapleton	Single	We Don't Fight Anymore

== Songland ==
McAnally was also a mentor on the songwriting competition series, Songland, which ran on NBC from 2019 to 2020. On Songland, McAnally worked alongside esteemed producers Ryan Tedder and Ester Dean, collaborating with unknown songwriters to craft hit songs. Each "winning" song is recorded by that episode's musical guest and released immediately following the episode. McAnally has described his role on the show as his "wildest dream job that I never knew I wanted." Songs co-written by McAnally as a part of his role on Songland are as follows.

Season	Episode	Producer	Song	Co-writers	Result
1	John Legend	Shane McAnally	"We Need Love"	Tebby Burrows, John Legend, Ester Dean, Ryan Tedder, Andrew DeRoberts, Andre Lyon, Imran Avaz, Juan Jose Botero, Marcello Valenzano, Thomas Kessler	Won
1	John Legend	Ester Dean	"Something New"	Ollie Gabriel, Ryan Tedder, Ester Dean, Marty West, Rodney Jones	Top 3
1	John Legend	Ryan Tedder	"Lookin' Up"	Max Embers, Ryan Tedder, Ester Dean, Andrew DeRoberts, Elliott Marchent, Emily Shearman	Top 3
1	will.i.am	Ester Dean	"Be Nice"	will.i.am, Adam Friedman, Martjin Konijenburg, Ryan Merchant, Anish Sood, Ryan Tedder, Ester Dean, Snoop Dogg, Keith Harris, Lance Tolbert	Won
1	will.i.am	Shane McAnally	"Boxes"	Josh Logan, Bruce Wiegner, Ester Dean, Ryan Tedder, Andrew DeRoberts, will.i.am	Recorded
1	will.i.am	Ryan Tedder	"Invincible"	Charisma Divina Dixon, Calvin George Dixon, Ryan Stockbridge, Cody Michael Bolton, Ester Dean, Ryan Tedder, will.i.am	Recorded
1	Jonas Brothers	Ester Dean	"Greenlight"	John Brandon Paciolla, Nick Jonas, Kevin Jonas, Joe Jonas, Ester Dean, Ryan Tedder, Zach Skelton	Won
1	Jonas Brothers	Shane McAnally	"Crowded Places"	Rynn Kempthorn, Emily Fullerton, Michael McEachern, Ester Dean, Ryan Tedder, Andrew DeRoberts	Recorded
1	Jonas Brothers	Ryan Tedder	"Do You Think of Me"	Rachel Elizabeth Smith, Ester Dean, Ryan Tedder, Brent Kutzle	Recorded
1	Kelsea Ballerini	Ryan Tedder	"Better Luck Next Time"	Kelsea Ballerini, Darius Coleman, Taylor Sparks, Ester Dean, Ryan Tedder, Andrew DeRoberts	Won
1	Kelsea Ballerini	Ester Dean	"Crush"	Daniel Wright Goldberger, Jackson Wise, Ester Dean, Ryan Tedder	Recorded
1	Kelsea Ballerini	Shane McAnally	"Lying (Next To You)"	Jack Newsome, Elsa Curran, Christina Galligan, Ester Dean, Ryan Tedder, Andrew DeRoberts	Recorded
1	Meghan Trainor	Ryan Tedder	"Hurt Me"	Meghan Trainor, Ryan Tedder, Ester Dean, Nicole Haley Cohen, Jack Newsome, Mike Sabath, Zach Skelton	Won
1	Meghan Trainor	Shane McAnally	"Alone"	Josh Wood, Peter Wallevik, Daniel Davidsen, Ruby Spiro, Catie Turner, Ester Dean, Ryan Tedder, Andrew DeRoberts	Recorded
1	Meghan Trainor	Ester Dean	"We Got Us"	Brandin Jay, Kaylan Mary, Ester Dean, Ryan Tedder	Recorded
1	Aloe Blacc	Ryan Tedder	"Getting Started (Hobbs & Shaw)"	Aloe Blacc, Kyle Williams, Joel Rousseau, Justin Amundrud, Ester Dean, Ryan Tedder, Andrew DeRoberts, JID, Zach Skelton	Won
1	Aloe Blacc	Ester Dean	"Hero"	Maggie Gabbard, Heather Holley, Stefan Bredereck, Ester Dean, Ryan Tedder, John Paciolla, Khyre Ryler	Recorded
1	Aloe Blacc	Shane McAnally	"Same Blood"	Aloe Blacc, Steve Fee, Zachary Kale, Ester Dean, Ryan Tedder, Andrew DeRoberts	Released as Single
1	Macklemore	Shane McAnally	"Shadow"	Ester Dean, Ryan Tedder, Andrew DeRoberts, Ben Haggerty, Ori Rakib, Aaron Kleinstub, Coyle Girelli	Won
1	Macklemore	Ryan Tedder	"Unforgettable"	Ben Haggerty, Ryan Tedder, Ester Dean, Matthew Boda, Callan Searcy, Robbie Nevil	Top 3
1	Macklemore	Ester Dean	"Judgments"	Casey Cook, Cameron Stymeist, Ryan Tedder, Ester Dean, Norma Jean Martine	Top 3
1	Leona Lewis	Ryan Tedder	"Solo Quiero (Somebody to Love)"	Ester Dean, Ryan Tedder, Leona Lewis, Rosalyn Lockhart, Matthew Fonson, Alessandro Calemme, Alejandro Rengifo, Andres Torres, Juan Magan	Won
1	Leona Lewis	Shane McAnally	"When You Fall In Love"	Ester Dean, Ryan Tedder, Andrew DeRoberts, Cameron Rafati, Toby Gad	Top 3
1	Leona Lewis	Ester Dean	"Perfect Skin"	Ryan Tedder, Ester Dean, Dave Pittenger, Olivia Lane, Bonnie Baker	Top 3
1	Old Dominion	Shane McAnally	"Young"	Ester Dean, Ryan Tedder, Trevor Rosen, Matthew Ramsey, Katelyn Tarver, Brad Tursi, William Sellers, George Sprung Jr., James Abrahart, Pierre-Antoine Melki, Raphael Judrin, Nick Seeley, Benjamin Hovey, Andrew Tinker	Won
1	Old Dominion	Ester Dean	"Journey"	Ester Dean, Ryan Tedder, Jacob Lee Scott	Top 3
1	Old Dominion	Ryan Tedder	"Where The Road Ends"	Ryan Tedder, Ester Dean, Isaac Julius-Edwards, Moises Zulaica, Dani Blau, Daniel Sobrino, Andrew DeRoberts	Top 3
1	OneRepublic	Shane McAnally	"Somebody to Love"	Ester Dean, Ryan Tedder, JT Roach, Brent Kutzle, Andrew Wells, Kevin Fisher, Jintae Ko, Andrew DeRoberts	Won
1	OneRepublic	Jason Evigan	"Be Somebody"	Ester Dean, Ryan Tedder, Jason Evigan, Brigetta Truitt, Brett Truitt, Amanda Zelina	Top 3
1	OneRepublic	Ester Dean	"Darkest Days"	Ryan Tedder, Ester Dean, Jason Evigan, Madison Yanofsky, Joe Henderson	Top 3
1	Charlie Puth	Shane McAnally	"Pill For This"	Ester Dean, Ryan Tedder, Sam DeRosa, Ben Samana, Graham Muron	Top 3
1	Charlie Puth	Ester Dean	"Hate Love"	Ryan Tedder, Ester Dean, Joel Adams	Top 3
2	Lady Antebellum	Shane McAnally	"Champagne Night"	Ester Dean, Ryan Tedder, Hillary Scott, Charles Kelley, Dave Haywood, Madeline Merlo, Tina Parol, Patricia Conroy, Andrew DeRoberts, Dave Thomson	Won
2	Luis Fonsi	Ryan Tedder	"Sway"	Ester Dean, Ryan Tedder, Luis Fonsi, Andrew DeRoberts, Filippo Gabella, Mauricio Rengifo, Andres Torres	Won
2	H.E.R.	Ryan Tedder	"Wrong Places"	Ester Dean, Ryan Tedder, H.E.R., Zachary Powell, Raqual Castro, Darhyl Camper Jr.	Won
2	Martina McBride	Ester Dean	"Girls Like Me"	Ester Dean, Ryan Tedder, Martina McBride, Michael Tyler, Stephanie Chapman, Halie Wooldridge, Dan Swank, Alexis Kristine Shadle	Won
2	Julia Michaels	Ryan Tedder	"Give It To You"	Ester Dean, Ryan Tedder, Julia Michaels, Andrew DeRoberts, Joshua Keegan Bost	Won
2	Florida Georgia Line	Shane McAnally	"Second Guessing"	Ester Dean, Ryan Tedder, Tyler Hubbard, Brian Kelley (musician), Andrew DeRoberts, Corey Crowder, Griffen Palmer, Geoff Warburton, Ben Simonetti	Won
2	Boyz II Men	Ester Dean	"Love Struck"	Ester Dean, Ryan Tedder, Christopher Lee, James Gutch, Jerry Duplessis, Raymond Duplessis, Michael Wise, Wanya Morris, Nathan Morris, Shawn Stockman	Won
2	Ben Platt	Ryan Tedder	"Everything I Did to Get to You"	Ester Dean, Ryan Tedder, David Davis	Won
2	Usher feat. Tyga	Ester Dean	"California"	Ester Dean, Ryan Tedder, Usher, Tyga, Michael Wise, Kaj Nelson Blokhuis, Melvin Hough II, Rivelino Raoul Wouter, Ryan Cambetes	Won

== Awards and nominations ==
Year	Association	Category	Nominated work	Result
2013	American Country Awards	Song of the Year	"Merry Go 'Round"	Nominated
2013	American Country Awards	Song of the Year	"Mama's Broken Heart"	Nominated
2013	American Country Awards	Song of the Year	"Better Dig Two"	Nominated
2013	Country Music Association Awards	Song of the Year	"Merry Go 'Round"	Nominated
2013	Country Music Association Awards	Song of the Year	"Mama's Broken Heart"	Nominated
2013	Country Music Association Awards	Single of the Year	"Merry Go 'Round"	Nominated
2013	Country Music Association Awards	Album of the Year	Same Trailer Different Park	Nominated
2013	Academy of Country Music Awards	Songwriter of the Year	—N/a	Nominated
2013	MusicRow Awards	Song of the Year	"Merry Go 'Round"	Won
2014	Grammy Awards	Best Country Song	"Merry Go 'Round"	Won
2014	Grammy Awards	Best Country Song	"Mama's Broken Heart"	Nominated
2014	Grammy Awards	Best Country Album	Same Trailer Different Park	Won
2014	Academy of Country Music Awards	Album of the Year	Same Trailer Different Park	Won
2014	Academy of Country Music Awards	Song of the Year	"Mama's Broken Heart"	Nominated
2014	Academy of Country Music Awards	Songwriter of the Year	—N/a	Won
2014	Country Music Association Awards	Song of the Year	"Follow Your Arrow"	Won
2015	MusicRow Awards	Producer of the Year	—N/a	Nominated
2015	Academy of Country Music Awards	Song of the Year	"American Kids"	Nominated
2015	Academy of Country Music Awards	Song of the Year	"Follow Your Arrow"	Nominated
2015	Grammy Awards	Best Country Song	"American Kids"	Nominated
2015	Country Music Association Awards	Album of the Year	Pageant Material	Nominated
2015	Country Music Association Awards	Single of the Year	"Take Your Time"	Nominated
2015	Country Music Association Awards	Song of the Year	"American Kids"	Nominated
2015	Country Music Association Awards	Song of the Year	"Take Your Time"	Nominated
2016	Academy of Country Music Awards	Album of the Year	Montevallo	Nominated
2016	Academy of Country Music Awards	Single Record of the Year	"Take Your Time"	Nominated
2016	Academy of Country Music Awards	Songwriter of the Year	—N/a	Nominated
2016	AIMP Nashville Awards	Song of the Year	"John Cougar, John Deere, John 3:16"	Nominated
2016	AIMP Nashville Awards	Song of the Year	"Say You Do"	Nominated
2016	AIMP Nashville Awards	Song of the Year	"Take Your Time"	Nominated
2016	AIMP Nashville Awards	Songwriter of the Year	—N/a	Nominated
2017	Country Music Association Awards	Song of the Year	"Body Like a Back Road"	Nominated
2017	Academy of Country Music Awards	Song of the Year	"Vice"	Nominated
2017	Academy of Country Music Awards	Vocal Event of the Year	"Forever Country"	Nominated
2017	Academy of Country Music Awards	Songwriter of the Year	—N/a	Nominated
2017	Grammy Awards	Best Country Album	Pageant Material	Nominated
2017	Grammy Awards	Best Country Album	Montevallo	Nominated
2017	Grammy Awards	Best Country Song	"Vice"	Nominated
2017	CMT Artist of the Year Awards	Song of the Year	"Body Like a Back Road"	Won
2017	AIMP Nashville Awards	Song of the Year	"Vice"	Nominated
2017	AIMP Nashville Awards	Independent Songwriter of the Year	—N/a	Nominated
2018	Country Music Association Awards	Song of the Year	"Body Like a Back Road"	Nominated
2018	Country Music Association Awards	Single of the Year	"Drinkin' Problem"	Nominated
2018	Academy of Country Music Awards	Songwriter of the Year	—N/a	Nominated
2018	Academy of Country Music Awards	Song of the Year	"Body Like a Back Road"	Nominated
2018	Academy of Country Music Awards	Song of the Year	"Female"	Nominated
2018	Academy of Country Music Awards	Album of the Year	Happy Endings	Nominated
2018	Academy of Country Music Awards	Single Record of the Year	"Drinkin' Problem"	Nominated
2018	Grammy Awards	Best Country Song	"Body Like a Back Road"	Nominated
2018	Grammy Awards	Best Country Song	"Drinkin' Problem"	Nominated
2018	Billboard Music Awards	Top Country Song	"Body Like a Back Road"	Won
2018	AIMP Nashville Awards	Song of the Year	"Drinkin' Problem"	Won
2018	AIMP Nashville Awards	Songwriter of the Year	—N/a	Won
2018	AIMP Nashville Awards	Publisher's Pick	"Space Cowboy"	Nominated
2019	Academy of Country Music Awards	Songwriter of the Year	—N/a	Won
2019	Academy of Country Music Awards	Song of the Year	"Space Cowboy"	Nominated
2019	Grammy Awards	Best Country Song	"Space Cowboy"	Won
2019	AIMP Nashville Awards	Songwriter of the Year	—N/a	Nominated
2019	AIMP Nashville Awards	Song of the Year	"Rainbow"	Won
2019	Country Music Association Awards	Song of the Year	"Rainbow"	Nominated
2020	Academy of Country Music Awards	Songwriter of the Year	—N/a	Nominated
2020	Academy of Country Music Awards	Single of the Year	"One Man Band"	Nominated
2020	MusicRow Awards	Song of the Year	"One Night Standards"	Nominated
2020	AIMP Nashville Awards	Publisher's Pick	"One Night Standards"	Won
2020	Grammy Awards	Best Country Song	"Some People Do"	Nominated
2020	Country Music Association Awards	Album of the Year	Old Dominion	Nominated
2021	Academy of Country Music Awards	Songwriter of the Year	—N/a	Nominated
2021	Academy of Country Music Awards	Song of the Year	"One Night Standards"	Nominated
2021	Academy of Country Music Awards	Song of the Year	"Some People Do"	Nominated
2021	AIMP Nashville Awards	Songwriter of the Year	—N/a	Nominated
2021	AIMP Nashville Awards	Song of the Year	"One Night Standards"	Nominated
2021	MusicRow Awards	Song of the Year	"Next Girl"	Nominated
2021	MusicRow Awards	Song of the Year	"Half of My Hometown"	Nominated
2021	Country Music Association Awards	Song of the Year	"One Night Standards"	Nominated
2021	Country Music Association Awards	Album of the Year	29	Nominated
2022	Academy of Country Music Awards	Album of the Year	29: Written in Stone	Nominated
2022	Academy of Country Music Awards	Single of the Year	"Fancy Like"	Nominated
2022	Academy of Country Music Awards	Song of the Year	"7 Summers"	Nominated
2022	Academy of Country Music Awards	Music Event of the Year	"Never Wanted to Be That Girl"	Won
2022	MusicRow Awards	Producer of the Year	—N/a	Nominated
2022	MusicRow Awards	Male Songwriter of the Year	—N/a	Nominated
2022	MusicRow Awards	Songwriter of the Year	"Never Wanted to Be That Girl"	Nominated
2022	Country Music Association Awards	Song of the Year	"Never Wanted to Be That Girl"	Nominated
2022	Country Music Association Awards	Album of the Year	Time, Tequila & Therapy	Nominated
2022	Country Music Association Awards	Single of the Year	"Never Wanted to Be That Girl"	Nominated
2022	Country Music Association Awards	Musical Event of the Year	"Never Wanted to Be That Girl"	Won
2022	Country Music Association Awards	Musical Event of the Year	"Longneck Way To Go"	Nominated
2023	Academy of Country Music Awards	Single of the Year	"Never Wanted to Be That Girl"	Nominated
2023	Drama Desk Awards	Outstanding Music	Shucked	Won
2023	Drama Desk Awards	Outstanding Lyrics	Shucked	Nominated
2023	Outer Critics Circle Awards	Outstanding New Score	Shucked	Nominated
2023	76th Tony Awards	Best Musical	Shucked	Nominated
2023	76th Tony Awards	Best Original Score - Shane McAnally, Brandy Clark	Shucked	Nominated
2023	76th Tony Awards	Best Book of a Musical - Robert Horn	Shucked	Nominated
2023	76th Tony Awards	Best Orchestrations - Jason Howland	Shucked	Nominated
2023	76th Tony Awards	Best Featured Actor - Alex Newell	Shucked	Won
2023	76th Tony Awards	Best Featured Actor - Kevin Cahoon	Shucked	Nominated
2023	76th Tony Awards	Best Direction - Jack O'Brien	Shucked	Nominated
2023	76th Tony Awards	Best Scenic Design - Scott Pask	Shucked	Nominated
2023	76th Tony Awards	Best Sound Design - John Shivers	Shucked	Nominated
2023	Outer Critics Circle Awards	Outstanding Featured Performer in a Broadway Musical - Alex Newell	Shucked	Nominated
2023	Outer Critics Circle Awards	Outstanding Book of a Musical - Robert Horn	Shucked	Nominated
2023	TJ Martell Foundation	Spirit of Music Award	—N/a	Won
2023	Country Music Association Awards	Musical Event of the Year	"We Don't Fight Anymore"	Nominated
2024	Grammy Awards	Songwriter of the Year	—N/a	Nominated
2024	Grammy Awards	Best Musical Theatre Album	Shucked	Nominated
2025	Grammy Awards	Best Country Song	"The Architect"	Won
