= Cameron Duddy =

American musician and music video director

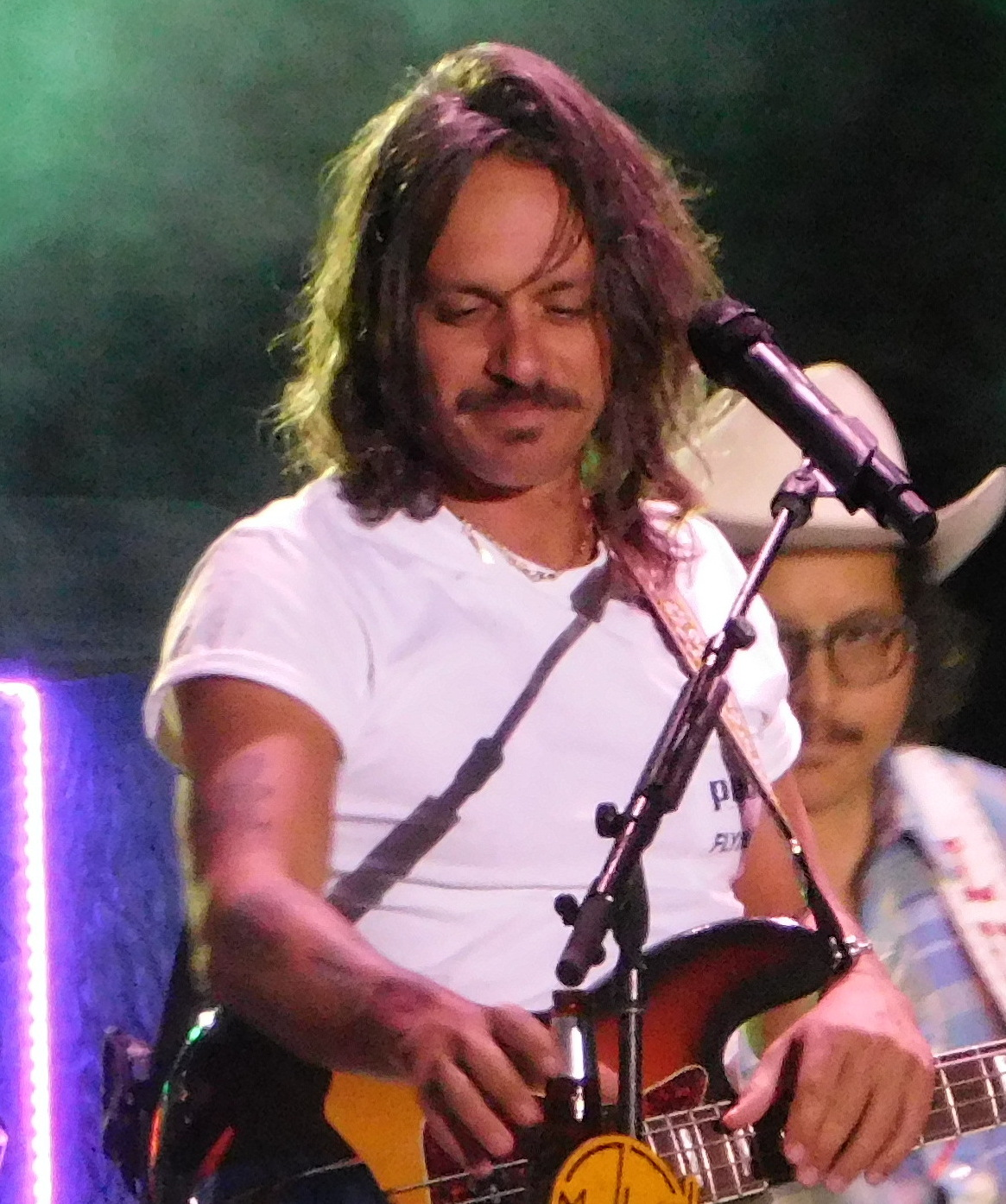
- Duddy performing in 2019
- Born: Cameron Thomas Duddy; December 6, 1985 (age 40); Dripping Springs, Texas, U.S.
- Occupations: Singer; songwriter; bassist; director
- Years active: 2014–present
- Spouse: Harper Smith
- Musical career
- Genres: Country
- Instruments: Vocals; bass guitar
- Label: Big Machine
- Member of: Midland

Cameron Thomas Duddy (born December 6, 1985) is an American music video director and musician with over 9 billion views across his work. As a director, he is known for his work with Bruno Mars, OneRepublic, and Fifth Harmony. Most notably, Cameron directed the video for "Uptown Funk", winning an EMA, VMA, and topping charts as the 3rd most viewed video on YouTube. He is also the bass guitarist in the band Midland.

== Career ==
=== Music video director ===
Duddy has directed over 20 music videos, that include Mark Ronson and Bruno Mars' "Uptown Funk" and Fifth Harmony's "Worth It". In 2017, Cameron also directed Bruno Mars' "24K Magic" which earned him a BET award and three VMA nominations for "Best Video," "Best Director," and "Best Art Direction". He has also worked with Jennifer Lopez, Britney Spears, Iggy Azalea, One Republic and most recently received an MTV Award for “Best Rock Video” for John Mayer's single, "Last Train Home". Duddy also received a CMT nomination for "Best Group Video" for directing the debut single/video from his country trio, Midland.

=== Musician/songwriter ===
Duddy is one of the founding members of the country music trio Midland. Formed in 2016 in Dripping Springs, Texas, it consists of Mark Wystrach (lead vocals), himself as bass guitarist and background vocalist, and Jess Carson (electric guitar, background vocals). Midland's musical styles are defined by neotraditional country influences. Through Big Machine Records, Midland has released four full-length LPs; the first, On The Rocks, achieved gold status and produced their triple-platinum hit, "Drinkin Problem", as well as a platinum hit, "Burn Out". The album earned them two Grammy nominations and several CMA, ACM and CMT nominations as well as a win for ‘Best New Group’ at the ACM Awards. The band most recently released their fourth album, titled The Last Resort: Greetings From, leading Midland on a world tour with several sold out performances in Australia, Europe, and the US.

=== Film director ===
In June 2025, Duddy was announced to make his feature-length debut with Cowboy, based on a story he wrote with Midland member Carson. Wystrach will also appear in the film, alongside Ben Foster, Rudy Pankow, Gabriel Basso, Taylor Lewan, Laysla De Oliveira, and Simon Rex.

== Personal life ==
Duddy is the son of cinematographer Christopher Duddy and Renee Axotis. He is the stepson of actress Joely Fisher, and also stepgrandson of actress Connie Stevens.

He is married to photographer Harper Smith. They have a son and a daughter.

== Nominations and awards ==
- 2013: MTV Video Music Awards, Best Direction (Locked Out of Heaven)
- 2015/2017: MTV Video Music Awards, Best Direction (nominee)
- 2018: Grammy, Best Country Song (nominee)
