= Mark Wystrach =

American singer and actor

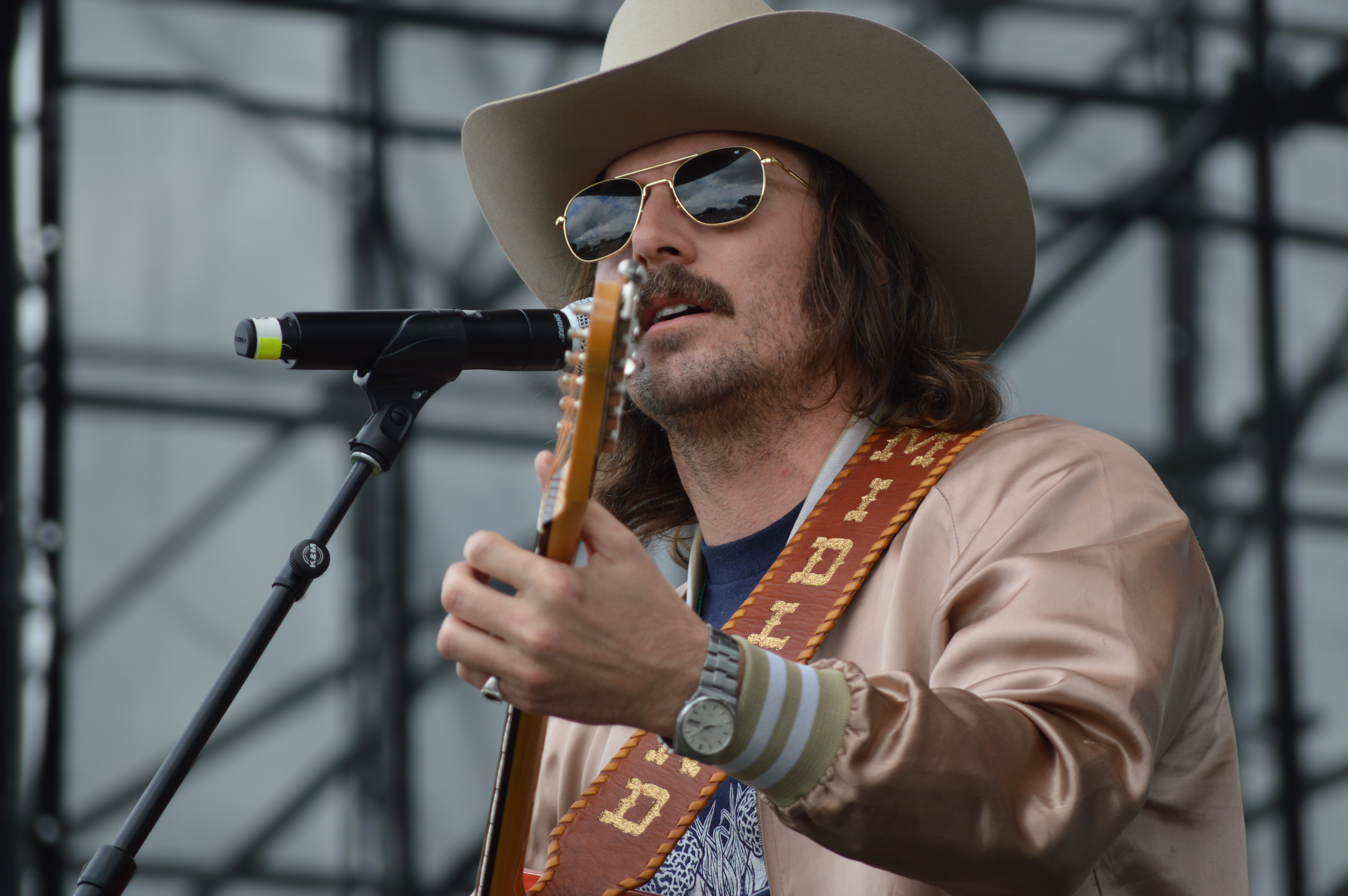
- Wystrach performing in 2018
- Born: 1979 or 1980 (age 45–46); Sonoita, Arizona, U.S.
- Education: University of Arizona
- Occupations: Singer; songwriter; guitarist; actor
- Years active: 2006–present
- Spouse: Tyler Haney
- Children: 2
- Relatives: Alex Flanagan (sister)
- Musical career
- Genres: Country
- Instruments: Vocals; guitar
- Label: Big Machine
- Member of: Midland

Mark Wystrach is an American country music musician and actor. He is the lead singer of the country band Midland. Wystrach appeared in the Academy Award-winning film The Eyes of Tammy Faye.

== Acting and modeling careers ==
Wystrach played the role of Fox Crane on the NBC soap opera Passions from 2006–2007 before the show moved to DirecTV in September 2007. He had a cameo role in CSI: Miami (season 6, episode 11). He played Nolan and Vic Fraiser, aka Kamen Rider Wrath, in the television series Kamen Rider: Dragon Knight. In 2017, Wystrach took the title role in the movie Johnny Christ.

He also portrayed country singer Gary S. Paxton in the 2021 film The Eyes of Tammy Faye.

He was also signed to IMG Models as a model.

== Personal life ==
In October 2019, he married entrepreneur Tyler Haney. They have two children.
