= Lady A discography =

Discography

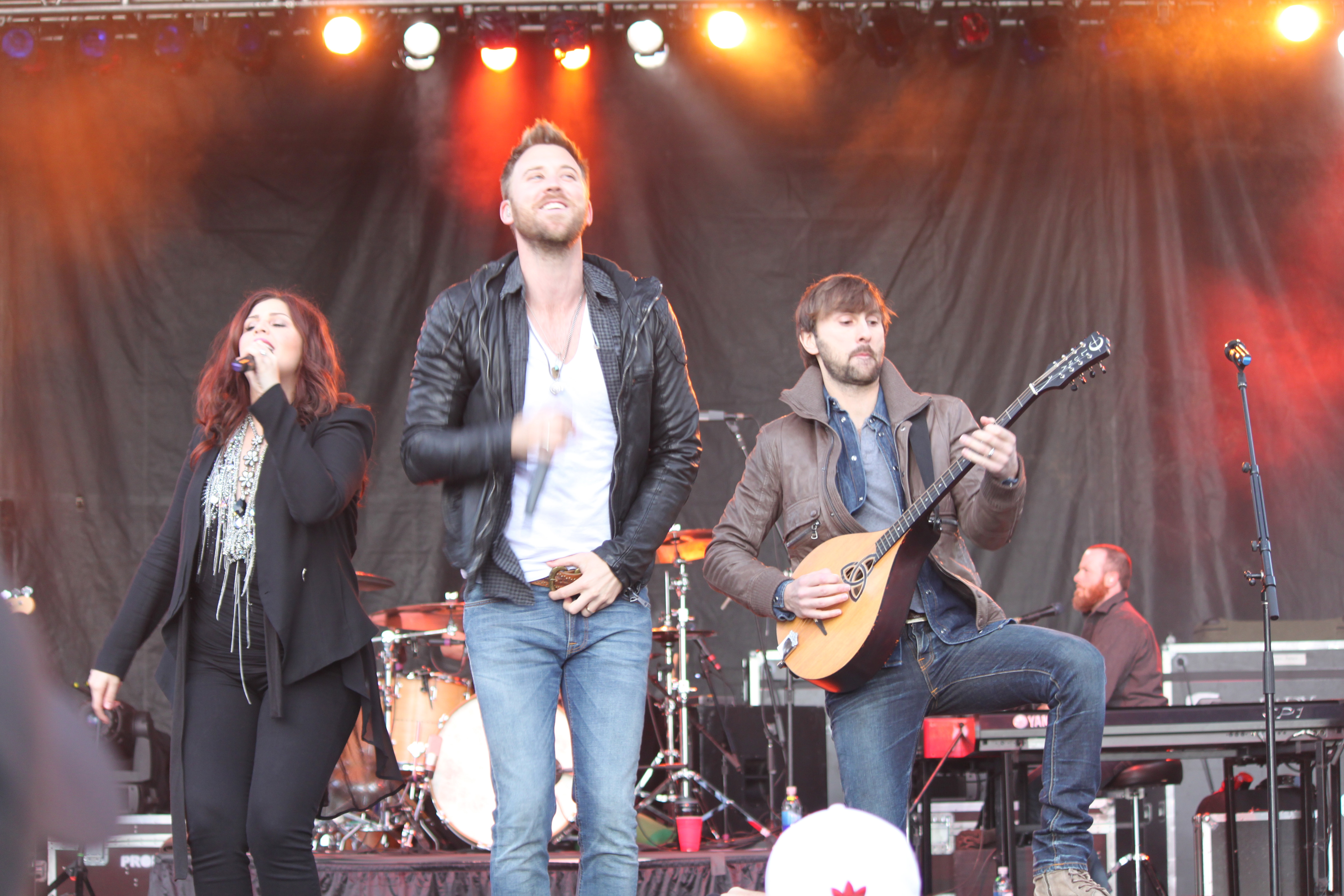
- Lady A performing in Charlotte, North Carolina
- Studio albums: 9
- Extended plays: 2
- Singles: 30
- Music videos: 35
- No. 1 singles (Billboard): 11
- No. 1 singles (overall): 12

Lady A (formerly known as Lady Antebellum) are an American country music group composed of Hillary Scott, Charles Kelley and Dave Haywood. They have released nine studio albums (which includes one Christmas album), two extended plays, two box sets, and 23 singles, not counting guest appearances or digital-only releases. The lead singers are Charles Kelly and Hillary Scott. All ten of their full-length releases have debuted in the top ten on the Top Country Albums chart, including five number-ones. They have sold 10.2 million albums in the US as of February 2016.

The trio's debut album was released in 2008 via Capitol Records Nashville. It included the singles "Love Don't Live Here", "Lookin' for a Good Time" and "I Run to You", with the latter becoming the group's first number one on the US Billboard Hot Country Songs chart as well as the number one country music song of the year according to Billboard Year-End chart. It was followed by "Need You Now", the title track to the group's second album. This song reached number-one on the country, Adult Contemporary, and Adult Pop Songs charts, as well as number 2 on the Billboard Hot 100 and Canadian Hot 100. After it came the number-one country hits "American Honey" and "Our Kind of Love", followed by the top 10 "Hello World".

The band's third studio album, Own the Night, was released on September 13, 2011. Its first two singles, "Just a Kiss" and "We Owned the Night", both reached number one. Their fifth studio album, Golden, was released on May 7, 2013. 747, their sixth studio album, was released on September 30, 2014.

== Albums ==
=== Studio albums ===
List of studio albums, with selected chart positions, sales figures and certifications
Title	Details	Peak chart positions										Sales	Certifications
Title	Details	US	US Country	AUS	CAN	IRE	NL	NZ	SWI	UK	UK Country	Sales	Certifications
Lady Antebellum	Released: April 15, 2008; Label: Capitol Nashville; Formats: CD, digital download	4	1	—	—	—	—	—	—	191	1	US: 2,100,000	RIAA: 2× Platinum; BPI: Silver; MC: Platinum
Need You Now	Released: January 26, 2010; Label: Capitol Nashville; Formats: CD, digital download	1	1	5	1	11	4	1	10	8	1	US: 4,221,000	RIAA: 4× Platinum; ARIA: Platinum; BPI: Platinum; MC: 3× Platinum; RMNZ: Platinum
Own the Night	Released: September 13, 2011; Label: Capitol Nashville; Formats: CD, digital download	1	1	5	1	18	25	2	8	4	1	US: 1,837,525	RIAA: Platinum; ARIA: Platinum; BPI: Gold; MC: Platinum
Golden	Released: May 7, 2013; Label: Capitol Nashville; Formats: CD, digital download	1	1	8	2	10	76	26	14	7	1	US: 558,000	RIAA: Platinum; ARIA: Gold; BPI: Silver; MC: Gold
747	Released: September 30, 2014; Label: Capitol Nashville; Formats: CD, digital download	2	2	4	3	21	78	22	24	12	1	US: 285,900	MC: Gold; BPI: Silver; RMNZ: Platinum
Heart Break	Released: June 9, 2017; Label: Capitol Nashville; Formats: CD, digital download, vinyl	4	1	6	6	44	64	— (Note: Heart Break did not enter the NZ Top 40 Albums Chart, but peaked at number one on the NZ Heatseekers Albums Chart.)	18	14	2	US: 175,900	
Ocean	Released: November 15, 2019; Label: BMLG; Formats: CD, digital download, vinyl, streaming	11	2	7	17	—	—	—	24	29	1	US: 62,400	
What a Song Can Do	Released: October 22, 2021; Label: BMLG; Formats: CD, digital download, streaming	135	12	48	—	—	—	—	52	—	1		
"—" denotes releases that did not chart or were not released to that country.

=== Christmas albums ===
Title	Details	Peak chart positions					Sales	Certifications
Title	Details	US	US Country	US Holiday	CAN	UK	Sales	Certifications
On This Winter's Night	Release date: October 22, 2012; Label: Capitol Nashville; Formats: CD, digital download	8	2	1	5	56	US: 648,500	RIAA: Gold; MC: Platinum
On This Winter's Night Vol. 2	Released: September 26, 2025; Label: BMLG; Formats: CD, digital download, streaming	—	—	—	—	—		

=== Box sets ===
Title	Details	Peak chart positions		
Title	Details	US Country	UK	UK Country
Need You Now/ Own the Night	Release date: November 27, 2012; Label: Capitol Nashville, EMI, Parlophone, Virgin; Formats: CD, digital download	—	80	1
Golden/Own the Night/ Need You Now/Lady Antebellum	Release date: September 30, 2014; Label: Capitol Nashville; Formats: CD, digital download	43	—	—
"—" denotes releases that did not chart or were not released to that country.

== Extended plays ==
Title	Details	Peak chart positions				
Title	Details	US	US Country	US Holiday	AUS	UK Country
iTunes Session	Release date: August 17, 2010; Label: Capitol Nashville; Formats: Digital download	17	3	—	—	—
A Merry Little Christmas	Release date: October 12, 2010; Label: Capitol Nashville; Formats: CD, digital download	12	4	1	—	—
What a Song Can Do (Chapter One)	Release date: June 25, 2021; Label: BMLG; Formats: digital download, streaming	—	—	—	97	3
"—" denotes releases that did not chart.

== Singles ==
=== As lead artist ===
Year	Title	Peak chart positions										Sales	Certifications	Album
Year	Title	US	US Country Songs	US Country Airplay	US AC	US Adult	CAN	CAN Country	CAN AC	NL	UK	Sales	Certifications	Album
2007	"Love Don't Live Here"	53	3		—	—	69	5	—	—	—		RIAA: Gold	Lady Antebellum
2008	"Lookin' for a Good Time"	67	11		—	—	—	18	—	—	—		RIAA: Gold	Lady Antebellum
2009	"I Run to You"	27	1		14	15	54	1	17	—	118		RIAA: 2× Platinum; RMNZ: Gold	Lady Antebellum
2009	"Need You Now"	2	1		1	1	2	1	1	7	15		RIAA: 11× Platinum; ARIA: 3× Platinum; BPI: 3× Platinum; RMNZ: 4× Platinum	Need You Now
2010	"American Honey"	25	1		—	—	50	1	—	—	—		RIAA: Platinum	Need You Now
2010	"Our Kind of Love"	51	1		—	—	61	1	—	—	—			Need You Now
2010	"Hello World"	58	6		—	—	70	4	—	—	—			Need You Now
2011	"Just a Kiss"	7	1		1	4	13	1	6	91	78	US: 2,366,000	RIAA: 2× Platinum; MC: Platinum; RMNZ: Gold	Own the Night
2011	"We Owned the Night"	31	1		—	—	29	1	—	—	—	US: 593,000	RIAA: Gold	Own the Night
2011	"Dancin' Away with My Heart"	46	2		—	—	65	1	33	—	—	US: 551,000	RIAA: Gold	Own the Night
2012	"Wanted You More"	34	20		—	—	59	10	—	—	—	US: 354,000		Own the Night
2013	"Downtown"	29	2	1	—	—	26	1	31	—	—	US: 981,000	RIAA: Platinum	Golden (and Deluxe Edition)
2013	"Goodbye Town"	80	22	11	—	—	77	11	—	—	—	US: 121,000		Golden (and Deluxe Edition)
2013	"Compass"	46	6	1	—	—	51	2	—	—	—	US: 546,000	RIAA: Gold; MC: Gold	Golden (and Deluxe Edition)
2014	"Bartender"	31	4	1	—	25	29	1	—	—	—	US: 1,118,000	RIAA: Platinum; MC: Platinum	747
2014	"Freestyle"	— (Note: "Freestyle" did not enter the Billboard Hot 100, but peaked at number 1 on the Bubbling Under Hot 100 Singles chart, which acts as a 25-song extension.)	24	16	—	—	—	17	—	—	—	US: 41,000		747
2015	"Long Stretch of Love"	— (Note: "Long Stretch of Love" did not enter the Billboard Hot 100, but peaked at number 6 on the Bubbling Under Hot 100 Singles chart, which acts as a 25-song extension.)	23	16	—	—	—	34	—	—	—	US: 59,000		747
2017	"You Look Good"	59	8	4	—	—	99	8	—	—	—	US: 408,000	MC: Gold	Heart Break
2017	"Heart Break"	— (Note: "Heart Break" did not enter the Billboard Hot 100, but peaked at number five on the Bubbling Under Hot 100 Singles chart, which acts as a 25-song extension.)	22	15	—	—	—	33	—	—	—	US: 67,000		Heart Break
2019	"What If I Never Get Over You"	40	5	1	—	—	74	6	—	—	—	US: 154,000	RIAA: Platinum; MC: Platinum	Ocean (and Deluxe Edition)
2019	"Ocean"	—	37	—	—	—	—	—	—	—	—			Ocean (and Deluxe Edition)
2020	"What I'm Leaving For"	—	39	39	—	—	—	—	—	—	—			Ocean (and Deluxe Edition)
2020	"Champagne Night"	33	7	1	—	—	75	1	—	—	—		RIAA: Platinum; MC: Gold	Ocean (and Deluxe Edition)
2021	"Like a Lady"	85	20	13	—	—	94	4	—	—	—		MC: Gold	What a Song Can Do
2022	"What a Song Can Do"	—	—	41	—	—	—	—	—	—	—			What a Song Can Do
2022	"Summer State of Mind"	—	—	—	—	—	—	—	—	—	—			Non-album singles
2023	"Love You Back"	—	— (Note: "Love You Back" did not enter the Billboard Hot Country Songs, but peaked at number 22 on the Country Digital Songs component chart.)	47	—	—	—	—	—	—	—			Non-album singles
2025	"Wouldn't Be Christmas"	—	—	—	13	—	—	—	—	—	—			On This Winter's Night (Volume 2)
2026	"I Love the One" (with Boyz II Men)	—	—	—	—	—	—	—	—	—	—			The Chosen – Inspired By (Seasons 1-5)
2026	"Bigger Picture"	—	—	—	—	—	—	—	—	—	—			
"—" denotes releases that did not chart or were not released to that country.

=== As featured artist ===
Year	Title	Peak chart positions										Certifications	Album
Year	Title	US	US Country Songs	US Country Airplay	US AC	US Club	US Dance	US Pop	AUS	CAN	CAN Country	Certifications	Album
2007	"Never Alone" (Jim Brickman featuring Lady Antebellum)	—	—	—	14	—	—	—	—	—	—		Escape and Never Alone
2015	"Something Better" (Audien featuring Lady Antebellum)	— (Note: "Something Better" did not enter the Billboard Hot 100, but peaked at number 17 on the Bubbling Under Hot 100 Singles chart, which acts as a 25-song extension.)	—	—	—	1	10	29	—	—	—	RIAA: Gold	Daydreams
2016	"Forever Country" (among Artists of Then, Now & Forever)	21	1	32	—	—	—	—	26	25	34	RIAA: Gold	Non-album single
2020	"Who You Are to Me" (Chris Tomlin featuring Lady A)	—	30	—	—	—	—	—	—	—	—		Chris Tomlin & Friends
"—" denotes releases that did not chart or were not released to that country or format.

=== Promotional singles ===
Year	Title	Peak chart positions				Album
Year	Title	US	US Country Songs	US Country Airplay	CAN	Album
2008	"I Was Here"	— (Note: "I Was Here" did not enter the Billboard Hot 100, but peaked at number 24 on the Bubbling Under Hot 100 Singles chart, which acts as a 25-song extension.)	54		—	AT&T Team USA Soundtrack
2008	"Baby, It's Cold Outside"	— (Note: "Baby, It's Cold Outside" did not enter the Billboard Hot 100, but peaked at number 3 on the Bubbling Under Hot 100 Singles chart, which acts as a 25-song extension.)	—		—	Non-album single
2010	"Ready to Love Again"	72	—		76	Need You Now
2010	"Love This Pain"	93	—		72	Need You Now
2013	"Celebrate Me Home"	—	— (Note: "Celebrate Me Home" did not enter the Billboard Hot Country Songs, but peaked at number 47 on the Country Digital Songs component chart.)	—	—	Non-album single
2014	"Golden" (featuring Stevie Nicks)	—	50	—	—	Golden
2014	"I Did with You"	—	35	—	—	The Best of Me
2015	"Lie with Me" (Note: Released in the UK only in February 2015.)	—	—	—	—	747
2019	"Pictures"	—	— (Note: "Pictures" did not enter the Billboard Hot Country Songs chart, but peaked at number 10 on the Country Digital Song Sales component chart.)	—	—	Ocean
2019	"Boots"	—	—	—	—	Ocean
2019	"Be Patient with My Love"	—	— (Note: "Be Patient with My Love" did not enter the Billboard Hot Country Songs chart, but peaked at number 18 on the Country Digital Song Sales component chart.)	—	—	Ocean
"—" denotes releases that did not chart.

== Other charted songs ==
Year	Title	Peak chart positions							Album
Year	Title	US Bubbling	US Country Songs	US Country Airplay	US AC	CAN Country	CAN AC	UK	Album
2010	"When You Got a Good Thing"	21	—	—	—	—	—	—	Need You Now
2010	"Learning to Fly"	1	—	—	—	—	—	—	iTunes Session
2010	"Out of Goodbyes" (with Maroon 5)	3	—	—	—	—	—	—	Hands All Over
2010	"Have Yourself a Merry Little Christmas"	—	36		—	—	—	—	A Merry Little Christmas
2010	"Let It Snow! Let It Snow! Let It Snow!"	—	34		—	—	—	—	A Merry Little Christmas
2010	"All I Want for Christmas Is You"	—	38		—	49	—	176	A Merry Little Christmas
2011	"Blue Christmas"	—	42		—	—	—	—	A Merry Little Christmas
2011	"Silver Bells"	—	47		—	—	—	—	A Merry Little Christmas
2011	"On This Winter's Night"	—	59		—	—	—	—	A Merry Little Christmas
2012	"A Holly Jolly Christmas"	—	35	37	2	—	9	—	On This Winter's Night
2012	"This Christmas"	—	—	—	—	—	2	—	On This Winter's Night
2012	"Christmas (Baby Please Come Home)"	—	—	—	—	—	24	—	On This Winter's Night
2013	"All for Love"	—	45	—	—	—	—	—	Golden
2015	"Where It All Begins" (with Hunter Hayes)	—	45	—	—	—	—	—	The 21 Project
2017	"Somebody Else's Heart"	—	47	—	—	—	—	—	Heart Break
"—" denotes releases that did not chart.

== Other appearances ==
Year	Title	Other artist(s)	Album
2011	"Walkin' After Midnight"	Anna Wilson	Countrypolitan Duets
2014	"Falling for You"	—N/a	The Best of Me
2014	"White Christmas"	Michael W. Smith	The Spirit of Christmas
2014	"Blue Water" (not credited)	Stevie Nicks	24 Karat Gold: Songs from the Vault
2015	"Where It All Begins"	Hunter Hayes	The 21 Project
2017	"Lay Our Flowers Down"	—N/a	The Shack: Music from and Inspired By the Original Motion Picture
2017	"Hey Baby"	—N/a	Dirty Dancing: Original Television Soundtrack
2017	"We've Got a Good Fire Goin'"	—N/a	Gentle Giants: The Songs of Don Williams
2018	"Our Love Glows"	Steve Aoki	Neon Future III

== Videography ==
=== Video Albums ===
Title	Details	Certifications
Own the Night World Tour	Release date: December 4, 2012; Label: Eagle Rock Entertainment; Formats: DVD, Blu-ray	RIAA: Gold
Live: On This Winter's Night	Release date: November 12, 2013; Label: Eagle Rock Entertainment; Formats: DVD, Blu-ray	
Wheels Up Tour	Release date: November 13, 2015; Label: Eagle Rock Entertainment; Formats: DVD, Blu-ray	

=== Music videos ===
Year	Title	Director
2007	"Never Alone" (with Jim Brickman)	Glenn Sweitzer
2007	"Love Don't Live Here" (version 1)	Jeff Johnson
2008	"Love Don't Live Here" (version 2)	Chris Hicky
2008	"Lookin' for a Good Time" (version 1)	Adam Boatman
2008	"Lookin' for a Good Time" (version 2)	Chris Hicky
2008	"I Was Here"	Unknown
2009	"I Run to You"	Adam Boatman
2009	"Need You Now"	David McClister
2010	"American Honey"	Trey Fanjoy
2010	"Stars Tonight"	Adam Boatman
2010	"Our Kind of Love"	Chris Hicky
2010	"I Run to You" (version 2)	Christopher Sims
2010	"Hello World"	Roman White
2011	"Just a Kiss"	Shaun Silva
2011	"We Owned the Night"	Shaun Silva
2011	"We Owned the Night" (live)	Adam Boatman
2012	"Dancin' Away with My Heart"	Adam Boatman
2012	"Perfect Day"	Adam Boatman
2012	"Wanted You More"	Noble Jones
2012	"A Holly Jolly Christmas"	TK McKamy
2013	"Downtown"	Peter Zavadil
2013	"Goodbye Town" (acoustic)	Adam Boatman
2013	"Goodbye Town"	Peter Zavadil
2013	"Compass"	Peter Zavadil
2014	"Bartender"	Shane Drake
2014	"I Did with You"	Roman White
2014	"I Did with You" (Lyric Video)	—N/a
2014	"Freestyle"	Nathan Barnatt
2015	"Long Stretch of Love" (version 1)	Justin Key
2015	"Long Stretch of Love" (version 2)	TK McKamy
2017	"You Look Good"	Shane Drake
2017	"Heart Break"	Roman White
2019	"What If I Never Get Over You"	Sarah McColgan
2019	"Ocean"	
2020	"Let It Be Love" (Home Edition)	—N/a
2020	"Champagne Night"	Stav Ozdoda
2023	"Love You Back"	Hodges Usry

=== As featured artist ===
Year	Title	Director
2007	"Never Alone" (Jim Brickman)	Glenn Sweitzer
2011	"Out of Goodbyes" (Maroon 5)	Travis Schneider
2015	"Something Better" (Audien)	Will Joines
2016	"Forever Country" (Artists of Then, Now & Forever)	Joseph Kahn
