= List of awards and nominations received by Lady A =

Lady A awards and nominations
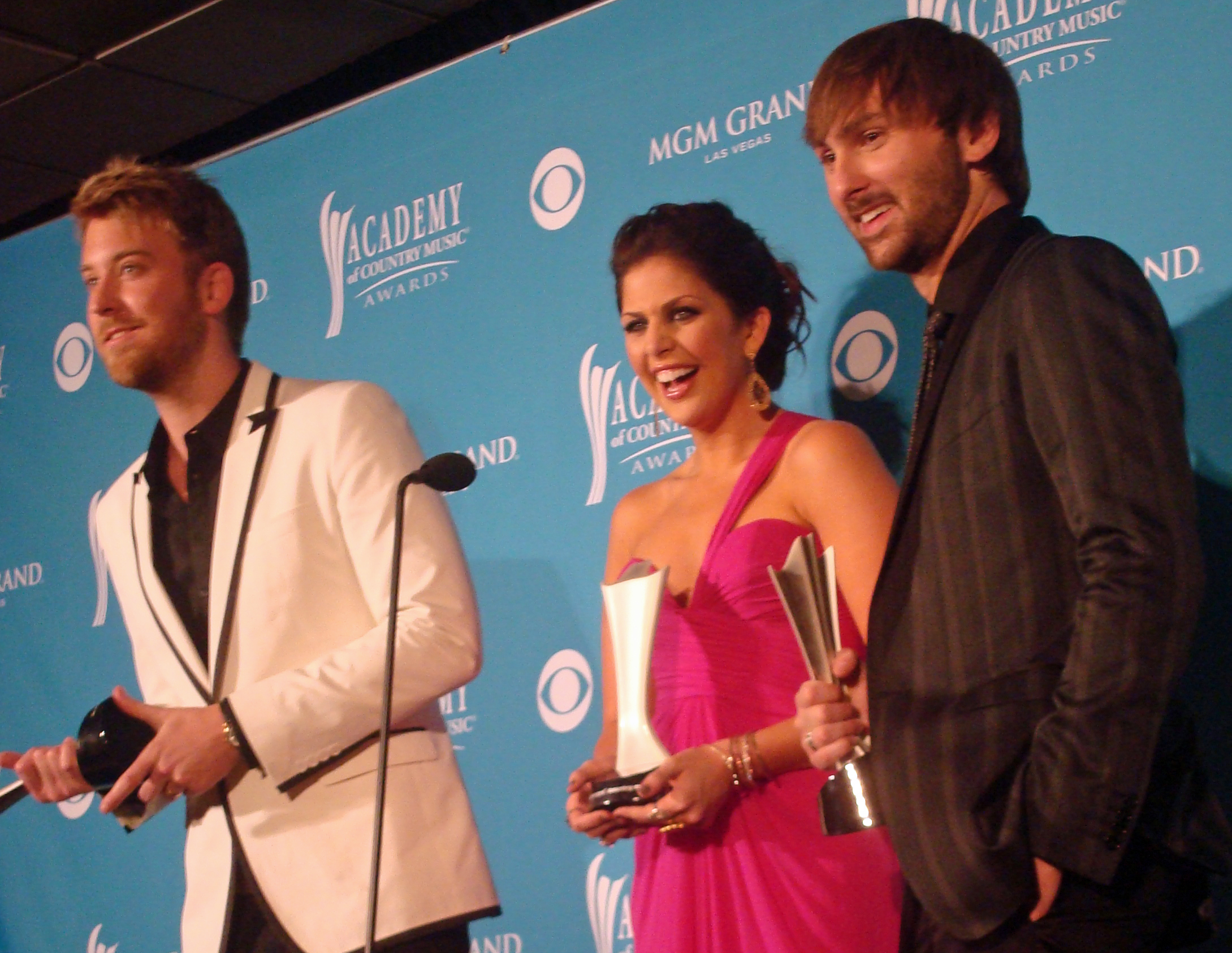
- Lady A (Charles Kelley, Hillary Scott, and Dave Haywood) at the 45th Annual Academy of Country Music Awards
Awards and nominations
| Award | Wins | Nominations |
| Grammy Awards | 7 | 14 |
| Academy of Country Music Awards | 14 | 25 |
| Country Music Association Awards | 7 | 24 |
| American Music Awards | 5 | 9 |
| CMT Music Awards | 16 | 23 |
| American Country Awards | 9 | 18 |
| Billboard Music Awards | 6 | 11 |
| People's Choice Awards | 2 | 6 |

Totals (Note: Certain award groups do not simply award one winner. They acknowledge several different recipients, have runners-up, and have third place. Since this is a specific recognition and is different from losing an award, runner-up mentions are considered wins in this award tally. For simplification and to avoid errors, each award in this list has been presumed to have had a prior nomination.)
- Wins: 78
- Nominations: 153

This is a list of awards and nominations received by American country music trio Lady A. Since winning the Country Music Association Awards New Artist of the Year award in 2008, the group have accumulated seven more awards, including their first Grammy Award in 2010 for Best Country Performance by Duo or Group with Vocals. At the 2009 CMAs, the group ended Rascal Flatts' six-year reign as Vocal Group of the Year. At the 2010 CMAs, they became the first artist in CMA Award history to receive the Single of the Year honor for two consecutive years.

== Academy of Country Music Awards ==
The Academy of Country Music Awards is an annual country music awards show, the first ever created, established in 1964. Lady A has won 14 ACM Awards out of 25 nominations.

| Year | Recipient | Award | Result |
|---|---|---|---|
| 2008 | Lady Antebellum | Top New Duo or Vocal Group | Won |
| 2009 | Lady Antebellum | Top Vocal Group | Nominated |
| 2010 | Lady Antebellum | Top Vocal Group of the Year | Won |
| 2010 | Lady Antebellum | Album of the Year | Nominated |
| 2010 | Need You Now | Single Record of the Year | Won |
| 2010 | Need You Now | Song of the Year | Won |
| 2010 | Need You Now | Video of the Year | Nominated |
| 2011 | Lady Antebellum | Vocal Group of the Year | Won |
| 2011 | Need You Now | Album of the Year | Won |
| 2012 | Lady Antebellum | Vocal Group of the Year | Won |
| 2012 | Own the Night | Album of the Year | Nominated |
| 2012 | "Just a Kiss" | Song of the Year | Nominated |
| 2012 | "Just a Kiss" | Music Video of the Year | Nominated |
| 2013 | Lady Antebellum | Vocal Group of the Year | Nominated |
| 2013 | Lady Antebellum | Jim Reeves International Award | Won |
| 2014 | Lady Antebellum | Vocal Group of the Year | Nominated |
| 2014 | "Wagon Wheel" (with Darius Rucker) | Single of the Year | Nominated |
| 2014 | "Wagon Wheel" (with Darius Rucker) | Vocal Event of the Year | Nominated |
| 2015 | Lady Antebellum | Vocal Group of the Year | Nominated |
| 2017 | Lady Antebellum | Vocal Group of the Year | Nominated |
| 2018 | Lady Antebellum | Vocal Group of the Year | Nominated |
| 2019 | Lady Antebellum | Vocal Group of the Year | Nominated |
| 2020 | Lady A | Vocal Group of the Year | Nominated |
| 2020 | Single of the Year | "What If I Never Get Over You" | Nominated |
| 2021 | Vocal Group of the Year | Lady A | Nominated |

== American Country Awards ==
The American Country Awards is a country music awards show, entirely voted on by fans. Created by Fox in 2010, the awards honor country music artists in music, video, and touring categories. Lady A has won nine awards out of 18 nominations

| Year | Recipient | Award | Result |
|---|---|---|---|
| 2010 | Lady Antebellum | Artist of the Year | Nominated |
| 2010 | Lady Antebellum | Duo/Group of the Year | Won |
| 2010 | Need You Now | Album of the Year | Nominated |
| 2010 | "Need You Now" | Single of the Year | Won |
| 2010 | "Need You Now" | Single by a Duo/Group | Won |
| 2010 | "Need You Now" | Music Video of the Year | Nominated |
| 2010 | "Need You Now" | Music Video by a Duo/Group | Won |
| 2011 | Lady Antebellum | Artist of the Year | Nominated |
| 2011 | Lady Antebellum | Duo/Group Artist of the Year | Won |
| 2011 | "Hello World" | Music Video by a Duo/Group/Collaboration | Nominated |
| 2012 | Lady Antebellum | Artist of the Year | Nominated |
| 2012 | Lady Antebellum | Duo/Group Artist of the Year | Won |
| 2012 | Own the Night | Album of the Year | Nominated |
| 2012 | "We Owned the Night" | Single by a Duo/Group | Won |
| 2012 | "Dancing Away with My Heart" | Music Video by a Duo/Group/Collaboration | Nominated |
| 2012 | Lady Antebellum | Touring Artist of the Year | Nominated |
| 2013 | Lady Antebellum | Duo/Group Artist of the Year | Won |
| 2013 | "Downtown" | Single by a Duo/Group | Won |

== American Music Awards ==
The American Music Awards is an annual awards ceremony created by Dick Clark in 1973. Lady A has won four AMA's out of ten nominations.

| Year | Recipient | Award | Result |
|---|---|---|---|
| 2010 | Need You Now | Favorite Country Album | Nominated |
| 2010 | Lady Antebellum | T-Mobile Favorite Breakthrough Artist | Nominated |
| 2010 | Lady Antebellum | Favorite Adult Contemporary Artist | Nominated |
| 2010 | Lady Antebellum | Favorite Pop/Rock Band/Duo/Group | Nominated |
| 2010 | Lady Antebellum | Favorite Country Band/Duo/Group | Won |
| 2011 | Lady Antebellum | Favorite Country Band/Duo/Group | Won |
| 2012 | Lady Antebellum | Favorite Country Band/Duo/Group | Won |
| 2013 | Lady Antebellum | Favorite Country Band/Duo/Group | Won |
| 2014 | Lady Antebellum | Favorite Country Band/Duo/Group | Nominated |
| 2021 | Lady A | Favorite Country Band/Duo/Group | Nominated |

== Billboard Music Awards ==
The Billboard Music Award is an honor given by Billboard, the preeminent publication covering the music business. Finalists are based on United States year-end chart performance according to Nielsen data for sales, number of downloads and total airplay. They have won two awards out of 11 nominations.

| Year | Recipient | Award | Result |
|---|---|---|---|
| 2011 | Lady Antebellum | Fan Favorite | Nominated |
| 2011 | Lady Antebellum | Top Billboard 200 Artist | Nominated |
| 2011 | Lady Antebellum | Top Duo/Group | Nominated |
| 2011 | Lady Antebellum | Top Country Artist | Nominated |
| 2011 | Need You Now | Top Country Album | Nominated |
| 2011 | Need You Now | Top Billboard 200 Album | Nominated |
| 2011 | "Need You Now" | Top Streaming Song (Audio) | Nominated |
| 2011 | "Need You Now" | Top Country Song | Won |
| 2012 | Lady Antebellum | Top Duo/Group | Nominated |
| 2012 | Lady Antebellum | Top Country Artist | Won |
| 2012 | Own the Night | Top Country Album | Nominated |

== British Country Music Association Awards ==
They have won one award out of two nominations.

| Year | Recipient | Award | Result |
|---|---|---|---|
| 2011 | Lady Antebellum | International Act of the Year | Nominated |
| 2012 | "We Owned the Night" | International Song of the Year | Won |

== CMT Music Awards ==
The CMT Music Awards is an annual fan-voted video music awards show that was established in 2002 by CMT, dedicated exclusively to honor country music videos. They won 6 awards out of 23 nominations.

| Year | Recipient | Award | Result |
|---|---|---|---|
| 2009 | "Lookin' for a Good Time" | Video of the Year | Nominated |
| 2009 | "Lookin' for a Good Time" | Group Video of the Year | Nominated |
| 2009 | "Lookin' for a Good Time" | USA Weekend Breakthrough Video of the Year | Nominated |
| 2010 | "Need You Now" | Video of the Year | Nominated |
| 2010 | "Need You Now" | Group Video of the Year | Won |
| 2010 | "American Honey" | Group Video of the Year | Nominated |
| 2010 | "Lookin' for a Good Time" | CMT Performance of the Year | Nominated |
| 2011 | "Hello World" | Video of the Year | Nominated |
| 2011 | "Hello World" | Group Video of the Year | Won |
| 2011 | "Stars Tonight" | Best Web Video of the Year | Nominated |
| 2012 | "We Owned the Night" | Video of the Year | Nominated |
| 2012 | "We Owned the Night" | Group Video of the Year | Won |
| 2012 | "Dancin' Away with My Heart" | CMT Performance of the Year | Nominated |
| 2013 | "Downtown" | Group Video of the Year | Won |
| 2014 | "Compass" | Group Video of the Year | Nominated |
| 2014 | "Rhiannon" (w/Stevie Nicks from CMT Crossroads) | CMT Performance Video of the Year | Nominated |
| 2015 | "Bartender" | Video of the Year | Nominated |
| 2015 | "Bartender" | Group Video of the Year | Won |
| 2015 | "Wake Me Up" (w/Aloe Blacc from CMT Ultimate Kickoff) | CMT Performance Video of the Year | Nominated |
| 2015 | "Drink a Beer" (w/Chris Stapleton from CMT Artist of the Year) | CMT Performance Video of the Year | Nominated |
| 2017 | "You Look Good" | Group Video of the Year | Nominated |
| 2018 | "You Look Good" | Group Video of the Year | Nominated |
| 2018 | "September" (feat. Earth Wind & Fire) | Performance of the Year | Nominated |

== Country Music Association Awards ==
The Country Music Association Awards is an annual country music awards show, established in 1967. They have won six CMA's out of 26 nominations.

| Year | Recipient | Award | Result |
|---|---|---|---|
| 2008 | Lady Antebellum | New Artist of the Year | Won |
| 2008 | Lady Antebellum | Vocal Group of the Year | Nominated |
| 2009 | "I Run to You" | Single of the Year | Won |
| 2009 | Lady Antebellum | Vocal Group of the Year | Won |
| 2010 | Lady Antebellum | Entertainer of the Year | Nominated |
| 2010 | Lady Antebellum | Vocal Group of the Year | Won |
| 2010 | Need You Now | Album of the Year | Nominated |
| 2010 | "Need You Now" | Single of the Year | Won |
| 2010 | "Need You Now" | Song of the Year | Nominated |
| 2010 | "Need You Now" | Music Video of the Year | Nominated |
| 2011 | Lady Antebellum | Vocal Group of the Year | Won |
| 2012 | Lady Antebellum | Vocal Group of the Year | Nominated |
| 2012 | Own the Night | Album of the Year | Nominated |
| 2013 | Lady Antebellum | Vocal Group Of The Year | Nominated |
| 2013 | "Downtown" | Video Of The Year | Nominated |
| 2014 | Lady Antebellum | Vocal Group of the Year | Nominated |
| 2014 | "Bartender" | Video of the Year | Nominated |
| 2015 | Lady Antebellum | Vocal Group of the Year | Nominated |
| 2016 | Lady Antebellum | Vocal Group of the Year | Nominated |
| 2017 | Lady Antebellum | Vocal Group of the Year | Nominated |
| 2017 | Heart Break | Album of the Year | Nominated |
| 2018 | Vocal Group of the Year | Lady Antebellum | Nominated |
| 2019 | Vocal Group of the Year | Lady Antebellum | Nominated |
| 2020 | Vocal Group of the Year | Lady A | Nominated |
| 2021 | Vocal Group of the Year | Lady A | Nominated |
| 2022 | Vocal Group of the Year | Lady A | Nominated |
| 2023 | Vocal Group of the Year | Lady A | Nominated |
| 2024 | Vocal Group of the Year | Lady A | Nominated |
| 2025 | Vocal Group of the Year | Lady A | Nominated |
| 2026 | Vocal Group of the Year | Lady A | Pending |

== Grammy Awards ==
The Grammy Awards are presented annually by the National Academy of Recording Arts and Sciences for outstanding achievements in the music industry. It was established in 1959. Lady A has won seven Grammys out of 14 nominations.

| Year | Recipient | Award | Result |
|---|---|---|---|
| 2009 | Lady Antebellum | Best New Artist | Nominated |
| 2009 | "Love Don't Live Here" | Best Country Performance by a Duo or Group with Vocals | Nominated |
| 2010 | "I Run to You" | Best Country Performance by a Duo or Group with Vocals | Won |
| 2010 | "I Run to You" | Best Country Song | Nominated |
| 2011 | Need You Now | Album of the Year | Nominated |
| 2011 | Need You Now | Best Country Album | Won |
| 2011 | "Need You Now" | Record of the Year | Won |
| 2011 | "Need You Now" | Song of the Year | Won |
| 2011 | "Need You Now" | Best Country Performance by a Duo or Group with Vocals | Won |
| 2011 | "Need You Now" | Best Country Song | Won |
| 2012 | Own the Night | Best Country Album | Won |
| 2018 | Heart Break | Best Country Album | Nominated |
| 2018 | "You Look Good" | Best Country Duo/Group Performance | Nominated |
| 2021 | "Ocean" | Best Country Duo/Group Performance | Nominated |

== People's Choice Awards ==
The People's Choice Awards is an annual American award show recognizing the people and the work of popular culture. The show was established in 1975, recognizing the people and work in popular culture, voted on by the general public. They have won two awards out of six nominations.

| Year | Recipient | Award | Result |
|---|---|---|---|
| 2011 | Lady Antebellum | Favorite Country Artist | Nominated |
| 2012 | Own the Night | Favorite Album of the Year | Nominated |
| 2012 | Lady Antebellum | Favorite Country Artist | Nominated |
| 2013 | Lady Antebellum | Favorite Country Artist | Nominated |
| 2015 | Lady Antebellum | Favorite Country Group | Won |
| 2016 | Lady Antebellum | Favorite Country Group | Won |

== Teen Choice Awards ==
The Teen Choice Awards is an annual award show that honors the year's biggest achievements in movies, music, television, sports, fashion and more voted by teens. The show was established in 1999. Lady A has won five awards out of ten nominations.

| Year | Recipient | Award | Result |
|---|---|---|---|
| 2010 | Need You Now | Choice Music: Album Country | Nominated |
| 2010 | "Need You Now" | Choice Music: Country Song | Nominated |
| 2010 | Lady Antebellum | Choice Country Group | Won |
| 2011 | "Just a Kiss" | Choice Music: Country Track | Nominated |
| 2011 | Lady Antebellum | Choice Country Group | Won |
| 2012 | Lady Antebellum | Choice Country Group | Won |
| 2012 | Lady Antebellum | Choice Music Group | Nominated |
| 2013 | Lady Antebellum | Choice Country Group | Won |
| 2014 | Lady Antebellum | Choice Country Group | Won |
| 2014 | "Bartender" | Choice Music Track: Country | Nominated |

== Tony Awards ==
The Antoinette Perry Award for Excellence in Theatre, more commonly known informally as the Tony Award, recognizes achievement in live Broadway theatre. The awards are presented by the American Theatre Wing and The Broadway League at an annual ceremony in New York City. They have been nominated for one Tony Award.

| Year | Recipient | Award | Result |
|---|---|---|---|
| 2018 | SpongeBob SquarePants | Best Original Score | Nominated |

== Other awards ==
| Year | Award | Category | Result |
|---|---|---|---|
| 2011 | Kids Choice Awards | Favorite Music Group | Nominated |
| 2012 | Brit Awards | International Group | Nominated |
| 2012 | British Country Music Awards | International Song of the Year ("We Owned the Night") | Won |
| 2012 | Kids Choice Awards | Favorite Music Group | Nominated |
| 2012 | Canadian Country Music Award | Top Selling International Album (Own The Night) | Won |
| 2012 | CMA | International Artist Achievement Award | Won |
| 2012 | Billboard Touring Awards | Breakthrough Award | Won |
| 2013 | CMC Music Awards | International Artist | Nominated |
| 2013 | CMC Music Awards | International Video ("Dancin' Away with My Heart") | Nominated |
| 2014 | American Country Countdown Awards | Artist of the Year | Nominated |
| 2014 | American Country Countdown Awards | Group/Duo of the Year | Nominated |
