= ITunes Session (Lady Antebellum EP) =

iTunes Session

EP by Lady Antebellum
- Released: August 17, 2010
- Recorded: 2010
- Genre: Country
- Length: 30:47
- Label: Capitol Nashville

Lady Antebellum chronology
Need You Now (2010)	iTunes Session (2010)	A Merry Little Christmas (2010)

Professional ratings
Review scores
Source	Rating
AllMusic	3/5 stars

iTunes Session is an EP by American country music group Lady Antebellum released on August 17, 2010 in the United States. The EP peaked at number 17 on the US Billboard 200.

== Track listing ==
No.	Title	Writer(s)	Length
1.	"I Run to You"	Hillary Scott, Charles Kelley, Dave Haywood, Tom Douglas	4:49
2.	"Need You Now"	Scott, Kelley, Haywood, Josh Kear	4:04
3.	"Learning to Fly"	Tom Petty, Jeff Lynne	4:30
4.	"Our Kind of Love"	Scott, Kelley, Haywood, Michael Busbee	4:06
5.	"Love This Pain"	Marv Green, Jason Sellers	3:16
6.	"American Honey"	Cary Barlowe, Hillary Lindsey, Shane Stevens	4:00
7.	"Hello World"	Douglas, Tony Lane, David Lee	5:42
Total length:			30:47

== Charts ==
Chart (2010)	Peak position
US Billboard 200	17
US Top Country Albums (Billboard)	3

== Release history ==
Region	Date	Format	Label
United States	August 17, 2010	Digital download	Capitol Records Nashville
