= Golden (Lady Antebellum song) =

- "Golden" cover

Promotional single by Lady Antebellum featuring Stevie Nicks

from the album Golden
- Released: April 1, 2014
- Recorded: 2014
- Genre: Country; soft rock
- Length: 3:26
- Label: Capitol Nashville
- Songwriters: Hillary Scott; Charles Kelley; Dave Haywood; Eric Paslay
- Producers: Paul Worley; Lady Antebellum

"Golden" is a song recorded by country music group Lady Antebellum for their 2013 album of the same name. The song was written by group members Hillary Scott, Charles Kelley, and Dave Haywood along with Eric Paslay. In 2014, "Golden" was re-recorded with guest vocals by rock singer Stevie Nicks, who likened the song to her band Fleetwood Mac's song "Landslide". This collaborative version was released as a digital single through Capitol Records Nashville on April 1, 2014.

== Background and recording ==
The last song written for the album, "Golden" came together in a matter of hours at Charles Kelley's house when the group invited Nashville singer-songwriter Eric Paslay (whose single "Friday Night" Lady Antebellum had recorded for their previous album, Own the Night) for a writing session. As Kelley explained to Entertainment Weekly, "I said, 'Just start playing, and I’m gonna start mumbling some words over these melodies,['] and the song just started pouring out." "Golden" went on to become the album title. "I think we’re really proud of that song," says Kelley. "It felt like we were getting back to the basics of how the three of us started out — just sittin’ in a room and writin’ and not thinkin’ about trying to write a hit."

Lady Antebellum and Stevie Nicks first collaborated on an episode of CMT Crossroads, where they performed several songs together from their respective catalogs (only seven of which were aired), including the former's "Golden". Charles Kelley sent the song to Nicks after she referenced Crosby, Stills & Nash, whose harmonies influenced the bridge on "Golden", in a phone call with the group. Nicks felt an emotional connection to the song. "Y’all don’t know what this song has meant to me," Nicks told them, "I think this is gonna be your 'Landslide.'"

The next year, Lady Antebellum approached Nicks about recording a studio version of "Golden" together, to which she agreed. This re-recording was released as a digital single on April 1, 2014 before being performed April 6 at the ACM Awards. In the announcement for the release, Nicks again compared the song to "Landslide", declaring: "I love Lady Antebellum, and to me, this song is their ‘Landslide’ because it’s just that spectacular."

== Chart performance ==
Chart (2014)	Peak position
US Hot Country Songs (Billboard)	50
