= A Merry Little Christmas (EP) =

EP by Lady Antebellum
- Released: October 12, 2010
- Length: 22:49
- Label: Capitol Nashville
- Producer: Paul Worley, Lady Antebellum

Lady Antebellum chronology
iTunes Sessions (2010)	A Merry Little Christmas (2010)	Own the Night (2011)

Professional ratings
Review scores
Source	Rating
Allmusic	3/5 stars

A Merry Little Christmas is a Christmas-themed extended play released by the American country music group Lady Antebellum, later known as Lady A, released on October 12, 2010. It was available for purchase only at the American discount department store chain Target. The EP has one original track, "On This Winter's Night", and a cover version of the Mariah Carey hit "All I Want for Christmas Is You". All six tracks are on the group's 2012 Christmas album, On This Winter's Night.

== Track listing ==
No.	Title	Writer(s)	Lead vocals	Length
1.	"Have Yourself a Merry Little Christmas"	Ralph Blane, Hugh Martin	Charles Kelley, Hillary Scott	4:12
2.	"All I Want for Christmas Is You"	Mariah Carey, Walter Afanasieff	Scott	3:37
3.	"Blue Christmas"	Billy Hayes, Jay W. Johnson	Kelley	3:29
4.	"On This Winter's Night"	Hillary Scott, Charles Kelley, Dave Haywood, Tom Douglas	Kelley, Scott	4:03
5.	"Let It Snow, Let It Snow, Let It Snow"	Sammy Cahn, Jule Styne	Scott	2:33
6.	"Silver Bells"	Jay Livingston, Ray Evans	Kelley	5:00
Total length:				22:49

== Charts ==
=== Weekly charts ===
Chart (2010)	Peak position
US Billboard 200	12
US Top Country Albums (Billboard)	4
US Top Holiday Albums (Billboard)	1

=== Year-end charts ===
Chart (2010)	Position
US Top Country Albums (Billboard)	64
Chart (2011)	Position
US Billboard 200	148
US Top Country Albums (Billboard)	34
