= Wanted You More =

Single by Lady Antebellum

from the album Own the Night
- Released: May 7, 2012
- Recorded: 2011
- Genre: Country
- Length: 4:02
- Label: Capitol Nashville
- Songwriters: Hillary Scott; Charles Kelley; Dave Haywood; Matt Billingslea; Dennis Edwards; Jonathan Long; Jason "Slim" Gambill
- Producers: Paul Worley; Lady Antebellum

Lady Antebellum singles chronology
"Dancin' Away with My Heart" (2011)	"Wanted You More" (2012)	"Downtown" (2013)

"Wanted You More" is a song recorded by American country music trio Lady Antebellum. It was released in May 2012 as the fourth single from their album Own the Night. The song was written by group members Hillary Scott, Charles Kelley, and Dave Haywood, along with Matt Billingslea (their original drummer), Dennis Edwards (their bass player), Jonathan Long (their keyboardist and band leader) and Jason Gambill (one of their electric guitar players), and it features lead vocals from both Scott and Kelley.

== Content ==
The song is about a relationship that is coming to an end, with the narrator realizing that her lover is not reciprocating the feelings of love. Charles Kelley and Hillary Scott said that they based the song around a melody that their touring band was improvising during a sound check.

== Music video ==
The music video directed by Noble Jones was released on June 29, 2012 on Lady Antebellum's official Vevo.

== Chart performance ==
"Wanted You More" debuted at number 57 on the Hot Country Songs chart dated May 26, 2012. It ultimately peaked at number 20 in September, making it Lady Antebellum's first single to miss the Top Ten since "Lookin' for a Good Time" peaked at number 11 in late 2008, and their lowest-charting single to date until “Love You Back” failed to reach the top 40. On the Canadian Country Airplay chart, the song fared slightly better, peaking at number 10 in August 2012.

Chart (2012)	Peak position
Canada Hot 100 (Billboard)	59
Canada Country (Billboard)	10
US Billboard Hot 100	34
US Hot Country Songs (Billboard)	20

=== Year-end charts ===
Chart (2012)	Position
US Country Songs (Billboard)	72
