= Just a Kiss (song) =

2011 single by Lady Antebellum

Single by Lady Antebellum

from the album Own the Night
- B-side: "Bottle Up Lightning"
- Released: May 2, 2011
- Recorded: 2011
- Studio: Warner (Nashville, Tennessee)
- Genre: Country; country pop
- Length: 3:39
- Label: Capitol Nashville
- Songwriters: Hillary Scott; Charles Kelley; Dave Haywood; Dallas Davidson
- Producers: Paul Worley; Lady Antebellum

Lady Antebellum singles chronology
"Hello World" (2010)	"Just a Kiss" (2011)	"We Owned the Night" (2011)

"Just a Kiss" is a song recorded by American country music group Lady Antebellum. It was released on May 2, 2011, as the lead single from the band's album Own the Night (2011). Dallas Davidson collaborated with band members Hillary Scott, Charles Kelley and Dave Haywood to write the song, taking inspiration from the members' personal experiences. Produced by Paul Worley, "Just a Kiss" was among the last songs recorded for the album, and is a mid-tempo country ballad with lyrics that speak of a romantic relationship between two new couples. Professional reviews for "Just a Kiss" have been mostly positive, commending on the song's theme and musical arrangement and also praising Lady Antebellum's performance, and it features lead vocals from both Scott and Kelley.

In the United States, the song debuted at number 28 on the Billboard Hot Country Songs chart and appeared at number seven on the Billboard Hot 100. It later topped the Country chart and was certified 2× Platinum by the Recording Industry Association of America (RIAA). The song peaked at number 13 in Canada, 22 in Japan and reached the top 80 in Australia and Slovakia. Shaun Silva directed a well-received music video for the song. It portrays the story of two young lovers, Joy, played by actress/model Danielle Donn, and Brady, set against a backdrop of scenery of Europe. The band first performed the song on their Houston Rodeo show on March 11, 2011, and later at the Divas Nashvegas benefit show. Following the single's release, they performed it on US reality television show American Idol and at the Billboard Music Awards. The group's live performances have been praised by critics. The song was featured in the season 2 finale of Pretty Little Liars and in the season 1, episode 17 of Hart of Dixie.

== Background and writing ==
The day we wrote this song was one of those days that renewed my faith in the bond the three of us have as songwriters. It came so easily, and it reminded me of the early days when we first started out, and we'd spend hours in my brother Josh's house writing songs. [...] We are just writing about what we are going through in our lives.

— Charles Kelley talking about "Just a Kiss" and the album.

After the 53rd Grammy Awards, held in February 2011, band members Charles Kelley and Dave Haywood said in a backstage interview that work on the group's third album was almost complete. On May 2, 2011, the band digitally released "Just a Kiss", the lead single from the new project. In a blog entry on their website, the group said that "Just a Kiss" was among the last songs that were written for the album. Haywood commented, "We were about six songs into recording and someone had this idea, so we sat down to write it." Hillary Scott, Kelley and Haywood wrote the song with Dallas Davidson. Davidson discussed the conception of the song with country music blog Taste of Country: "I went out on the road with them, and we wrote a couple of things. We recorded one song called 'We Own the Night'. Charles called me as they were about done with the record. He said, 'Man, we want to write again.' So the band came over [to my office] one morning. We started writing this other song. We were trying to find Hillary a little uptempo girl song. We wrote this cool thing."

The next day, Davidson found Haywood in his office, playing the keyboard part which was later revived for the song's riff. "When we got done with the other song, I kept going back, saying, 'Man, there's something about what you were playing earlier ... let's mess with that before we leave.' So he started playing it again," Davidson recalled. After the keyboard elements were completed, Scott and Kelley finished the song's music and lyrics at the studio. They discussed ideas for the song; Kelley put forward the basic melody and Scott followed up with her own contribution. After they wrote the lyrics, Davidson proposed that the song's title be "Just a Kiss Goodnight". It was later changed to "Just a Kiss" after Scott felt that "it's cool to have 'just a kiss' goodnight rather than going all the way." Kelley told Country Weekly that the song was inspired by the band members' experiences: "I remembered being out the first night with Cassie and thinking, 'This is different, and I don't want to give any wrong impression. I don't want to make the wrong move because this feels like something special.' We started talking about that and going back and forth with different experiences when we wrote the song." The song was recorded and mixed by Clarke Schleicher, with assistance from Joe Martino and Andrew Bazinet. The B-side track, "Bottle Up Lightning", was written by Kelley, Haywood, Tony Martin and Wendell Lee Mobley.

== Music and lyrics ==
"Just a Kiss" (2011)
A 22-second sample of the final chorus of "Just a Kiss", which has Kelley and Scott singing in harmony. The string instruments can also be heard.

"Just a Kiss" was produced by Paul Worley and lasts for three minutes and 41 seconds. The mid-tempo country power ballad opens with piano chords, played by Haywood. The melody builds up as the track progresses, exhibiting elements of pop music and incorporating acoustic guitars. As the "soaring chorus"—sung in three-part harmony by Scott and Kelley and backed by Haywood—starts, beats of "overly dramatic drums" are also heard, as described by music critic Matthew Wilkening. According to Tris McCall from The Star-Ledger, "Just a Kiss" contains the "specific structure" found in Lady Antebellum's previous songs. This was echoed by John Hill of About.com and Nadine Cheung of AOL Radio, both of whom compared the song's arrangement to that of "Need You Now" (2009). According to the sheet music published by Alfred Publishing Company, "Just a Kiss" is set in common time with a moderately slow tempo of 72 beats per minute. Written in the key of B♭ minor, it follows a chord progression of B♭m_{7}–A♭/C–D♭–G♭major_{9}, and Scott's vocals range from the note of A♭_{3} to F_{5}.

The lyrics of the song describe a "tortured romantic scenario" of a newly formed couple's relationship, which, according to McCall, is enhanced by the piano and guitar arrangements. Kelley and Scott alternate on lead vocals. It speaks of the couple who prefer not to take their romantic relationship further anytime soon, want to take things slow, and are satisfied with "just a goodnight kiss". McCall also noted that the lyrics portray how the female character's lines, sung by Scott, attempt to fight back her lustful feelings, and precariously sighs the line "I don't want to mess this thing up." Scott told Billboard that "there is so much excitement at the beginning of a new relationship ... all the butterflies and that optimistic feeling that this person could be 'the one'. This song is about one of those times when your brain kicks in and tells your heart 'good things are worth waiting for.'" Sarah Rodman of The Boston Globe wrote that the song's production is "emblematic of the album's midtempo complacency." Melinda Newman of HitFix noted that the strings "give a nice lift at the end."

== Critical reception ==
Bobby Peacock of Roughstock gave "Just a Kiss" a rating of four stars out of five and called it "another excellent song that plays up all of the band's strengths." Erik Ernst of the Milwaukee Journal Sentinel observed that the track's "lush melody" shows "new confidence for these musicians who have become bona fide stars." A Washington Post editor also gave a positive review, declaring "Just a Kiss" as "one of the group's finest". Daryl Addison, writing for Great American Country, commended the group's vocal chemistry in the song, adding that "[t]he group's dynamic allows them to explore a wide range of emotions as they each add their own voice." Melinda Newman of HitFix suggested that "Just a Kiss" is "a good summer song for young lovers." Robbie Daw of music website Idolator commented that the song "deftly captures" the state of nervousness that lovers experience during the early stages of the romance. Leah Greenblatt of Entertainment Weekly also praised "Just a Kiss" and noted that Lady Antebellum sing the song "like they mean it". He suggested that the song is "classy and very sincere". Stephen Hyden of The A.V. Club wrote that the song was "painfully chaste".

Matthew Wilkening, writing for Taste of Country, gave the song a score of 7.5 out of 10, writing that the song is "surprisingly serious and dour" in contrast to its subject matter, but he praised the "catchy melody". It also received 3.5 stars out of five from John Hill of About.com, who found it "lyrically lacking" but a "solid contribution to the power ballad genre". Jonathan Keefe of Slant Magazine found the song to be repetitive in its lyrical theme, and said that the group was "sticking to the blandly pleasant, cliché-driven songwriting of Need You Now, not taking a single risk." Tris McCall of The Star-Ledger criticized the song for bearing a close resemblance to "Need You Now" and concluded that "if you swooned for 'Need You Now', chances are you won't be able to resist the tidal pull of this one, either." Shahryar Rizvi of Dallas Observer was also less enthusiastic about the song, writing that it "seems kinda old-fashioned amongst all the outspoken and steamy acts in the Top 40." Rizvi concluded by noting that "maybe the music industry's just covering their bases by serving the demographic that appreciates sugar-coated love ballads over brash statements ... If not, well, then "Just A Kiss" will probably appear in sappy, modest teenage romantic comedies. If those types of movies still exist."

== Chart performance ==
"Just a Kiss" debuted on the US Billboard Hot Country Songs chart at number 28 on May 21, 2011. According to Nielsen BDS, the song opened with a first week audience of 6 million across 85 radio stations, becoming the group's highest debut to date. It marked the third highest debut on the chart among groups at the time, after Rascal Flatts's "Take Me There" and Sugarland's "All I Want to Do". The following week, the song ascended to number 20 on the chart, with the Greatest Gainer mark and soon became the band's fifth number-one hit. On the Billboard Hot 100, "Just a Kiss" debuted and peaked at number seven, setting a record for the highest debut on the chart for a country group. The song debuted at number three on the Hot Digital Songs chart due to sales of 211,000 downloads.

"Just a Kiss" stayed on the Hot 100 for 42 weeks and was certified 2× Platinum by the Recording Industry Association of America (RIAA) for sales of two million digital units. The song also experienced pop crossover success, peaking at number 21 on the Pop Songs chart, number one on the Adult Contemporary chart and number six on the Adult Pop Songs chart. In Canada, the song debuted and peaked on the Canadian Hot 100 at number thirteen, selling 15,000 units in its first week. It has stayed on the chart for 24 weeks and was certified Platinum by Music Canada for downloads of 80,000 units. The song reached number one on the Canada Country airplay chart, number six on the Canada AC chart, and number 23 on the Canada Hot AC chart as tracked by Billboard via Nielsen BDS. In Slovakia, "Just a Kiss" charted for three weeks on the Singles chart and peaked at number 73. In Japan, it peaked at number 21 on the Japan Hot 100. The song also charted and peaked in the United Kingdom and Australia, at number 78 and number 72, respectively, for one week, and at number 91 in the Netherlands.

== Music video ==
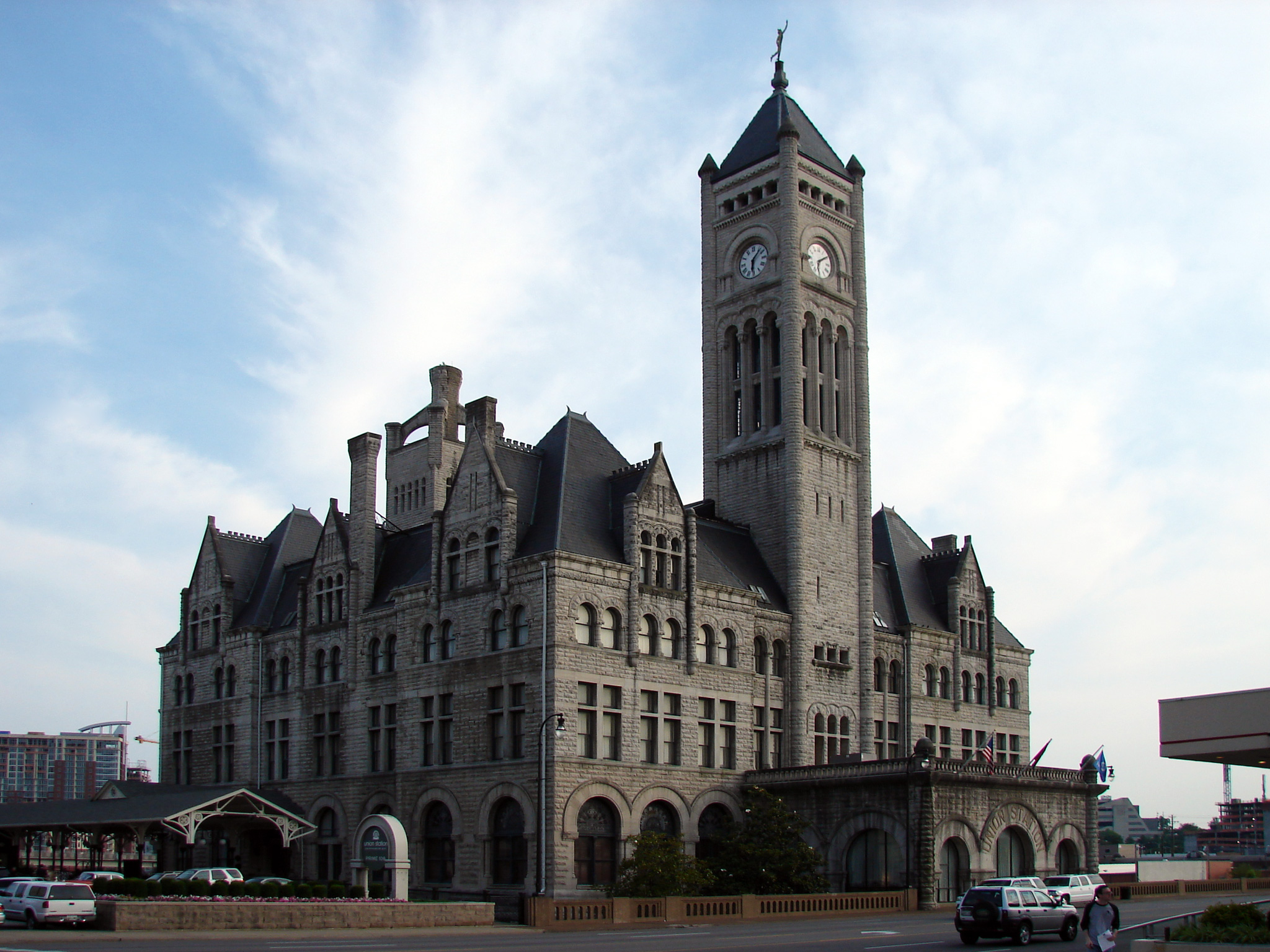
The Union Station Hotel, Nashville is featured as the train station in the video for "Just a Kiss".

The music video, directed by Shaun Silva, was filmed in Paris, London, and Murfreesboro, Tennessee. The Union Station hotel is featured as a train station in the video. Kelley explained that the director decided to shoot parts of the music video in Europe because he wanted the video to be "as authentic as possible". The video begins with a young woman, Joy, played by actress Danielle Donn, entering a train, taking a seat two rows in front of Scott and discovering an iPad in her backpack. The iPad has a video of her lover with a sign written in French words that mean "Don't forget about me," and also some videos of the couple's travels throughout London, Paris, and Berlin, after which the couple bid each other farewell. A subsequent scene shows Joy's boyfriend finding her sitting on a train seat and they share a kiss. Joy is then seen awoken from sleep as a man named Brady, who looks exactly like the boyfriend in Joy's dream, sits next to her. Brady apologizes for waking her and asks if she minds if he sits next to her. The two make introductions, and Joy mentions her dream. Brady then takes out his iPad case (exactly the same case as the one Joy had in her dream), and smiles at her. Joy smiles back, having experienced this deja vu moment. The group members are seen singing at a Tennessee train station, and on the train itself.

The band released teaser trailers first, and the full video premiered on June 27, 2011, 1 pm (Eastern Time), on the band's website. Jon Blistein of Billboard commented that the video "is sweet and will probably make you smile." AOL's The Boot also liked the video, writing, "If the storyline itself doesn't make you fall head over heels, the gorgeous scenery surely will, as the clip was shot in various picturesque places around the world." Amy Sciarretto of Taste of Country noted that the video was "heart-pinching". The Tennessean wrote that the "sweet sentimentality should score with fans of ... 'Need You Now'." However, Melinda Newman of HitFix deemed the video "sugary". Robbie Daw of Idolator wrote, "Lady A's [...] "Just A Kiss" video got us choked up after one viewing. Clearly we need to get out more."

== Live performances ==
Lady Antebellum sang a portion of "Just a Kiss" on their Houston Rodeo show, on March 11, 2011, performing it after "Love's Lookin' Good on You". The whole band stepped down, and Kelley and Scott sat on bar stools, singing the track to each other. They were accompanied by Haywood on a piano. Matthew Keever of Houston Express called "Just a Kiss" "the most intimate song of the evening", and Joey Guerra of the Houston Chronicle wrote that the song could become "another pop smash." They later performed at the Divas Nashvegas benefit show for the Oasis Center in April 2011. The same month, Lady Antebellum posted a Twitter message, saying that they would debut the whole song on the tenth season of the US reality television show American Idol. The performance aired on May 5, 2011. Natasha Mullan of TV Guide Canada wrote that the group sang the song on American Idol "in perfect harmony."

Lady Antebellum was tapped to perform "Just a Kiss" at the 2011 Billboard Music Awards, held in Las Vegas. The show aired on May 22, 2011, on ABC. Scott, Kelley and Haywood, dressed all in black, performed the song as Haywood played piano with their full band behind them. Scott Shetler of Taste of Country commended the performance, writing that the members were "harmonized beautifully, particularly on the song's hook." In June 2011, the group performed the song on the 2011 CMT Music Awards, where they were presented with the Award for Group Video of the Year (for "Hello World"). The band, dressed in black, sang "Just a Kiss" and a few lines of the song "Kiss" by Prince. The trio also performed the song on CBS's Late Show with David Letterman. Robbie Daw of Idolator wrote that the performance was "pitch-perfect". Lady Antebellum appeared as the musical guest on Saturday Night Live on October 1, 2011. They performed "We Owned the Night", followed by "Just a Kiss".

== Track listings ==
- CD single
1. "Just a Kiss" – 3:41
2. "Bottle Up Lightning" – 4:06
- Digital download
1. "Just a Kiss" – 3:41

== Credits and personnel ==
Credits for "Just a Kiss" are adapted from the Own the Night liner notes.

- Chad Cromwell – drums
- David Huff – drum loops
- Michael Rojas – Hammond B-3 organ
- Craig Young – bass guitar
- Dave Haywood – piano, acoustic guitar, background vocals
- Rob McNelly – electric guitar
- Jason "Slim" Gambill – electric guitar
- Paul Worley – electric guitar
- Hillary Scott – lead vocals
- Charles Kelley – lead vocals
- Karen Winkelmann – violin, string contractor
- David Davidson – violin
- Pamela Sixfin – violin
- David Angell – violin
- Mary Kathryn VanOsdale – violin
- Carolyn Bailey – violin
- Carolyn Huebl – violin
- Stephen Lamb – copyist
- Kristin Wilkinson – strings composer, string arrangements
- Monisa Angell – viola
- Elizabeth Lamb – viola
- Jonathan Yudkin – cello
- Anthony LaMarchina – cello
- Sari Reist – cello
- Kirsten Greer – cello
- Clarke Schleicher – recording, mixing
- Joe Martino – assistant
- Andrew Bazinet – assistant
- Erik Hellerman – additional engineering
- Brett "Scoop" Blanden – additional engineering
- Curt Jenkins – additional engineering
- Peter Bowman – additional engineering
- Andrew Mendelson – mastering (at Georgetown Masters, Nashville, TN)

== Charts ==
=== Weekly charts ===
Weekly chart performance for "Just a Kiss"
Chart (2011–2012)	Peak position
Australia (ARIA)	72
Canada Hot 100 (Billboard)	13
Canada AC (Billboard)	6
Canada Country (Billboard)	1
Canada Hot AC (Billboard)	23
Japan Hot 100 (Billboard)	21
Netherlands (Single Top 100)	91
Slovakia Airplay (ČNS IFPI)	73
UK Singles (OCC)	78
US Billboard Hot 100	7
US Adult Contemporary (Billboard)	1
US Adult Pop Airplay (Billboard)	4
US Hot Country Songs (Billboard)	1
US Pop Airplay (Billboard)	21

=== Year-end charts ===
2011 year-end chart performance for "Just a Kiss"
Chart (2011)	Position
Canada (Canadian Hot 100)	55
US Billboard Hot 100	42
US Adult Contemporary (Billboard)	25
US Adult Pop Songs (Billboard)	48
US Country Songs (Billboard)	13

2012 year-end chart performance for "Just a Kiss"
Chart (2012)	Position
US Adult Contemporary (Billboard)	4
US Adult Pop Songs (Billboard)	37

== Certifications ==
Certifications and sales for "Just a Kiss"
Region	Provider	Certification
Canada	Music Canada	Platinum
United States	RIAA	2× Platinum

== Release history ==
Release dates and formats for "Just a Kiss"
Country	Date	Format	Ref.
Canada	May 3, 2011	Digital download	
United States	May 3, 2011	Digital download	
United States	May 3, 2011	Country radio	
Canada	May 17, 2011	CD single	
United States	May 17, 2011	CD single	
United States	August 17, 2011	Adult contemporary radio	
United States	August 17, 2011	Hot adult contemporary	
United States	September 20, 2011	Contemporary hit radio	

== See also ==
- List of number-one country singles of 2011 (U.S.)
- List of Billboard Adult Contemporary number ones of 2012
