= Own the Night =

Studio album by Lady Antebellum
- Released: September 13, 2011
- Recorded: 2011
- Genre: Country; country pop
- Length: 47:49
- Label: Capitol Nashville
- Producer: Paul Worley & Lady Antebellum

Lady Antebellum chronology
A Merry Little Christmas (2010)	Own the Night (2011)	On This Winter's Night (2012)

Singles from Own The Night
- 1. "Just a Kiss" Released: May 2, 2011; 2. "We Owned the Night" Released: August 15, 2011; 3. "Dancin' Away with My Heart" Released: December 12, 2011; 4. "Wanted You More" Released: May 7, 2012

Own the Night is the third studio album by American country music trio Lady Antebellum. It was released on September 13, 2011 through Capitol Nashville. The production on the album was handled by Paul Worley and Lady Antebellum. The album was supported by four singles: "Just a Kiss", "We Owned the Night", "Dancin' Away with My Heart", and "Wanted You More".

Own The Night received mixed to positive reviews, with some critics praising its production and Hillary Scott's and Charles Kelley's vocals, calling it an improvement over their previous two albums, while others criticized its lyrical content and lack of personality, calling it a step downward from their previous albums. The album was also a commercial success, debuting at number one on the US Billboard 200, selling 347,000 copies in its first week. This became their second number-one album in the US and one of the most successful country albums of 2011. It also topped the Billboard Top Country Albums. At the 54th Grammy Awards, the album won the Grammy Award for Best Country Album.

== Singles ==
The album spawned four singles: "Just a Kiss", "We Owned the Night", "Dancin' Away with My Heart", and "Wanted You More". "Just a Kiss" is the lead single from the album and was released for digital download on May 2, 2011. The single was a commercial and critical success, debuting and peaking at number seven on the US Billboard Hot 100, making it their highest debut on the chart. It also topped the Billboard Hot Country Songs, making it their fifth number-one single on the chart.

Follow up singles were "We Owned the Night", "Dancin' Away with My Heart" and "Wanted You More", which charted moderately in the US Hot Country Songs. Both it and "We Owned the Night" peaked at number one on the US Hot Country Songs charts, with "Dancin' Away with My Heart" peaking at number two and "Wanted You More" peaking at number 20.

Eric Paslay, who co-wrote the track "Friday Night", released his own version of the song in March 2013.

== Critical reception ==
Professional ratings
Aggregate scores
Source	Rating
Metacritic	60/100
Review scores
Source	Rating
Allmusic	3/5 stars
American Songwriter	3/5 stars
Country Weekly	4/5 stars
Entertainment Weekly	(B)
Los Angeles Times	2.5/4 stars
Rolling Stone	2/5 stars
Slant Magazine	1.5/5 stars
Under The Gun Review	3/10

Upon its release, Own the Night received mixed-to-favourable reviews. At Metacritic, which assigns a weighted mean rating out of 100 to reviews from mainstream critics, the album received an average score of 60, based on twelve reviews, which indicates "generally mixed reviews". The New York Times was very positive about Own the Night and wrote this third album "elevates this group's fecklessness to high art. It makes no apologies for its blunt-force tactics. It owns its shamelessness. That cocksure stance helps to make it one of the most convincing albums of the year, a huge leap forward for a group that threatened to become famous without leaving a true mark." Giving it a four stars rating out of five, Country Weekly's Jessica Phillips appreciated that "For the most part, Lady Antebellum strikes a nice balance between the two -creating something different while replicating some elements of the previous album, keeping the penchant for bighearted ballads and the vocal chemistry between Charles Kelley and Hillary Scott intact". Billy Dukes of Taste of Country gave the album a 3.5 stars out of 5 commenting "In an effort to break new ground on their just released album, Own the Night, Lady Antebellum occasionally forget their strengths and weaknesses. Not every courageous step they take lands on solid ground, but it’s difficult to criticize a band for taking artistic chances." Entertainment Weekly gave the album a "B" grade commenting "With their easy pop-country tempos and ingratiating white-soul harmonies, Charles Kelley, Hillary Scott, and Dave Haywood are masters of the soft sell, an approach they employ here with characteristically genteel results." Randy Lewis of The Los Angeles Times found that "everything sounds bigger, brighter and shinier than on Lady A's first two albums. That'll probably go over well with fans of grandiose country pop" but he noted that "the all-stops-out production gradually loses impact." However, Stephen Thomas Erlewine of Allmusic was less enthusiastic about the album. He gave it a three stars rating and described it as "mood music but the aim isn't amorous; it's nothing more than a spot of relaxation, which doesn't quite amount to compelling listening no matter how immaculate the execution." American Songwriter found Own the Night not "high art" and despised the "clichéd country images" but did appreciate the singing "with the band stacking its harmonies three voices deep at every twist and turn" and that's why the album received a three stars rating. Nevertheless, Rolling Stone's Will Hermes was not convinced by the new album and gave it a two stars rating out of five. Jonathan Keefe of Slant Magazine negatively reviewed Own the Night: "In the past, the trio has been able to elevate their unremarkable songwriting with spirited performances, but that isn't the case on Own the Night". He found the band "across-the-board amateurish and anonymous".

== Commercial performance ==
Own the Night debuted at number one on the US Billboard 200 chart, selling 347,000 in its first week, according to Nielsen SoundScan. This became Lady Antebellum's second US number one debut. The album is the largest start for any country release since Taylor Swift's "Speak Now" (2010). The album also debuted at number one on the US Top Country Albums chart, becoming the group third number-one debut on that chart. In its second week, the album dropped to number two on the chart, selling an additional 125,000 copies. In its third week, the album dropped to number six on the chart, selling 75,000 more copies. In its fourth week, the album climbed to number four on the chart, selling 58,000 copies. Since its release, the album has topped the US Top Country Albums chart for 13 weeks. On October 17, 2011, the album was certified platinum by the Recording Industry Association of America (RIAA) for sales of over one million copies. As of June 2013, the album has sold 1,837,525 copies in the United States.

In Canada, the album debuted at number one on the Canadian Albums Chart, selling 21,000 copies in its first week. On September 27, 2011, the album was certified platinum by Music Canada (MC) for sales of over 80,000 copies.

== Own the Night Tour ==
The Own the Night Tour began on November 11, 2011, in Knoxville, Tennessee, and ended on October 3, 2012, in Sydney, Australia. The group played 104 shows on three continents.

== Track listing ==
No.	Title	Writer(s)	Lead Vocals	Length
1.	"We Owned the Night"	Charles Kelley; Dave Haywood; Dallas Davidson	Charles Kelley	3:18
2.	"Just a Kiss"	Hillary Scott; Kelley; Haywood; Davidson	Hillary Scott, Kelley	3:39
3.	"Dancin' Away with My Heart"	Scott; Kelley; Haywood; Josh Kear	Kelley, Scott	3:53
4.	"Friday Night"	Eric Paslay; Rose Falcon; Rob Crosby	Kelley	2:58
5.	"When You Were Mine"	Scott; Kelley; Haywood; busbee	Scott	4:54
6.	"Cold as Stone"	Scott; Kelley; Haywood; Hillary Lindsey	Kelley, Scott	4:48
7.	"Singing Me Home"	Kelley; Haywood; Rivers Rutherford	Kelley	3:53
8.	"Wanted You More"	Scott; Kelley; Haywood; Matt Billingslea; Dennis Edwards; Jonathan Long; Jason Gambill	Kelley, Scott	4:03
9.	"As You Turn Away"	Scott; Kelley; Haywood; Monty Powell	Scott	3:54
10.	"Love I've Found in You"	Scott; Kelley; Haywood; Patrick Davis	Kelley, Scott	3:53
11.	"Somewhere Love Remains"	Scott; Kelley; Haywood; Powell	Kelley, Scott	4:52
12.	"Heart of the World"	Tom Douglas; Scooter Carusoe	Kelley, Scott	3:44
Total length:				47:49

UK Digital Bonus Track
No.	Title	Writer(s)	Lead Vocals	Length
13.	"Need You Now" (acoustic version)	Scott; Kelley; Haywood; Josh Kear	Scott, Kelley	3:56

== Personnel ==
=== Lady Antebellum ===
- Dave Haywood – acoustic guitar, electric guitar, mandolin, piano, background vocals
- Charles Kelley – lead vocals, background vocals
- Hillary Scott – lead vocals, background vocals

=== Additional musicians ===
- Bruce Bouton – dobro, steel guitar
- Chad Cromwell – drums
- Jason "Slim" Gambill – electric guitar, soloist
- David Huff – drum loops, percussion
- Rob McNelley – electric guitar, soloist
- The Nashville String Machine – strings
- Mike Rojas – accordion, Hammond B-3 organ, piano, synthesizer
- Kris Wilkinson – string arrangements
- Karen Winklemann – penny whistle
- Paul Worley – acoustic guitar, electric guitar, soloist
- Craig Young – bass guitar
- Jonathan Yudkin – bouzouki, cello, fiddle, acoustic guitar, harp, mandolin

== Charts ==
=== Weekly charts ===
Chart (2011)	Peak position
Australian Albums (ARIA)	5
Australian Country Albums (ARIA)	1
Austrian Albums (Ö3 Austria)	38
Belgian Albums (Ultratop Flanders)	31
Belgian Albums (Ultratop Wallonia)	95
Canadian Albums (Billboard)	1
Danish Albums (Hitlisten)	26
Dutch Albums (Album Top 100)	25
Finnish Albums (Suomen virallinen lista)	44
French Albums (SNEP)	69
German Albums (Offizielle Top 100)	52
Irish Albums (IRMA)	18
Japanese Albums (Oricon)	39
New Zealand Albums (RMNZ)	2
Norwegian Albums (VG-lista)	28
Scottish Albums (OCC)	4
South African Albums Chart	3
Spanish Albums (Promusicae)	77
Swedish Albums (Sverigetopplistan)	39
Swiss Albums (Schweizer Hitparade)	8
UK Albums (OCC)	4
UK Country Albums (OCC)	1
US Billboard 200	1
US Top Country Albums (Billboard)	1

=== Year-end charts ===
Chart (2011)	Position
Australian Albums (ARIA)	76
Canadian Albums (Billboard)	29
New Zealand Albums (RMNZ)	40
UK Albums (OCC)	154
US Billboard 200	25
US Top Country Albums (Billboard)	6
Chart (2012)	Position
Australian Albums (ARIA)	100
Canadian Albums (Billboard)	30
UK Albums (OCC)	184
US Billboard 200	12
US Top Country Albums (Billboard)	4
Chart (2013)	Position
US Top Country Albums (Billboard)	61

=== Decade-end charts ===
Chart (2010–2019)	Position
US Billboard 200	84

=== Singles ===
Year	Single	Peak chart positions									Certifications (sales threshold)
Year	Single	US Country	US	US AC	US Adult	AUS	CAN Country	CAN	CAN AC	UK	Certifications (sales threshold)
2011	"Just a Kiss"	1	7	1	4	72	1	13	6	78	CAN: Platinum; US: 2× Platinum
2011	"We Owned the Night"	1	31	—	—	—	1	29	—	—	US: Gold
2011	"Dancin' Away with My Heart"	2	46	—	—	—	1	65	33	—	US: Gold
2012	"Wanted You More"	20	34	—	—	—	10	59	—	—	
"—" denotes releases that did not chart or were not released to that country

== Certifications ==
Region	Certification	Certified units/sales
Australia (ARIA)	Platinum	70,000^{^}
Brazil (Pro-Música Brasil)	Gold	20,000^{‡}
Canada (Music Canada)	Platinum	80,000^{^}
United States (RIAA)	Platinum	1,000,000^{^}
^{^} Shipments figures based on certification alone.^{‡} Sales+streaming figures based on certification alone.
