= Dancin' Away with My Heart =

Single by Lady Antebellum

from the album Own the Night
- Released: December 12, 2011
- Recorded: 2011
- Genre: Country
- Length: 3:53
- Label: Capitol Nashville
- Songwriter(s): Hillary Scott; Charles Kelley; Dave Haywood; Josh Kear
- Producer(s): Paul Worley; Lady Antebellum

Lady Antebellum singles chronology
"We Owned the Night" (2011)	"Dancin' Away with My Heart" (2011)	"Wanted You More" (2012)

"Dancin' Away with My Heart" is a song recorded by American country music trio Lady Antebellum. It was released in December 2011 as the third single from their album Own the Night. The song was written by Hillary Scott, Charles Kelley, Dave Haywood and Josh Kear. It became a top 5 hit, and it features lead vocals from both Scott and Kelley.

== Critical reception ==
Billy Dukes of Taste of Country gave the song three and a half stars out of five, saying that it "aims right down the country-pop middle but leaves one wanting for a little more depth." Kevin John Coyne of Country Universe gave the song a D, writing that "it isn't bad enough to be offensive" and "it doesn't exist enough to be bad."

== Music video ==
The music video was directed by Adam Boatman and premiered in February 2012. This was the back up video after the high-budget original video was shot in December, which was never released.

== Chart performance ==
"Dancin' Away with My Heart" debuted at number 57 on the U.S. Billboard Hot Country Songs chart for the week of December 24, 2011. It soon peaked at number 2, behind "Drink on It" by Blake Shelton and "Banjo" by Rascal Flatts.

Chart (2011–2012)	Peak position
Canada (Canadian Hot 100)	65
Canada AC (Billboard)	33
Canada Country (Billboard)	1
US Billboard Hot 100	46
US Hot Country Songs (Billboard)	2

=== Year-end charts ===
Chart (2012)	Position
US Country Songs (Billboard)	19

== Certifications ==
Region	Certification	Certified units/sales
United States (RIAA)	Gold	500,000^{^}
^{^} Shipments figures based on certification alone.
