= We Owned the Night =

Single by Lady Antebellum

from the album Own the Night
- Released: August 15, 2011
- Recorded: 2011
- Genre: Country
- Length: 3:17
- Label: Capitol Nashville
- Songwriters: Charles Kelley; Dave Haywood; Dallas Davidson
- Producers: Paul Worley; Lady Antebellum

Lady Antebellum singles chronology
"Just a Kiss" (2011)	"We Owned the Night" (2011)	"Dancin' Away with My Heart" (2011)

"We Owned the Night" is a song recorded by American country music trio Lady Antebellum. It was released in August 2011 as the second single from their album Own the Night. The song was co-written by Charles Kelley and Dave Haywood along with Dallas Davidson, and it features lead vocals from Kelley.

== Background ==
Charles Kelley and Dave Haywood wrote the song with Dallas Davidson. The title started during a conversation that Kelley had with his and Davidson's wives at a bar, telling them that they should "own the night" and stay longer at the bar. After hearing Lady Antebellum perform another uptempo song with a mandolin, Davidson suggested that Haywood and Kelley should "capture that same energy, and write a big hit song on the mandolin." Haywood then began playing the mandolin. Davidson said that he wanted the song to "dive into a deeper lyric, take it to a place a little more serious[…]but keep it light and keep it fun".

In the song, a man recalls a brief but memorable romantic encounter with a woman who he has not seen since. The song is in the key of D-flat major with an approximate tempo of 96 beats per minute. The song consists of four verses plus a bridge in between verses three and four. Its main chord pattern for each verse is D♭-G♭-E♭m-D♭, with all but the first verse ending in Kelley singing "yeah, we owned the night" over the pattern B♭m-G♭-D♭. In the bridge, the chord pattern is E♭m-G♭ twice, followed by another E♭ minor chord before returning to a final verse which uses the same pattern as verses two and three. The title phrase is then repeated one last time. All guitars in the song are tuned to E-flat tuning.

== Critical reception ==
Robbie Daw of Idolator commented that "once again, the country act serves up a pop-crossover jam that should appeal to a variety of listeners, and will no doubt find a home on an array of radio format playlists." Billy Dukes of Taste of Country gave the song a four and a half stars rating out of five. He explained "‘We Owned the Night’ is rootsy, something that couldn’t be said about any of the group’s previous singles. This being their third album, it was wise to take a chance sonically to avoid fan fatigue. The trio still manages to hang on to the lyrical suspense that makes their music so captivating." He concluded saying "This song is like Lady A with no makeup on, in beat up blue jeans and their collective hair pulled back in a ponytail. It’s a new style that’s still familiar, but sexy in its own way."

The song won the British Country Music Association (BCMA) award for International Song of the Year in 2012.

== Music video ==
The music video for "We Owned the Night" shows two couples on a date. At the end the couples end up at a gathering, everyone is dancing together, and there is a fireworks display at the end. Everyone is in a circle with Lady Antebellum performing in the middle. It was directed by Shaun Silva and shot in Nashville.

== Chart performance ==
Chart (2011–2012)	Peak position
Canada Hot 100 (Billboard)	29
Canada Country (Billboard)	1
US Billboard Hot 100	31
US Hot Country Songs (Billboard)	1

=== Year-end charts ===
Chart (2011)	Position
US Country Songs (Billboard)	56

Chart (2012)	Position
US Country Songs (Billboard)	61

=== Certifications ===
Region	Certification	Certified units/sales
United States (RIAA)	Gold	500,000^{^}
^{^} Shipments figures based on certification alone.

== Release history ==
Region	Date	Format	Label
United States	August 12, 2011	Digital download	Capitol Records
