= Hillary Scott =

American country singer (born 1986)

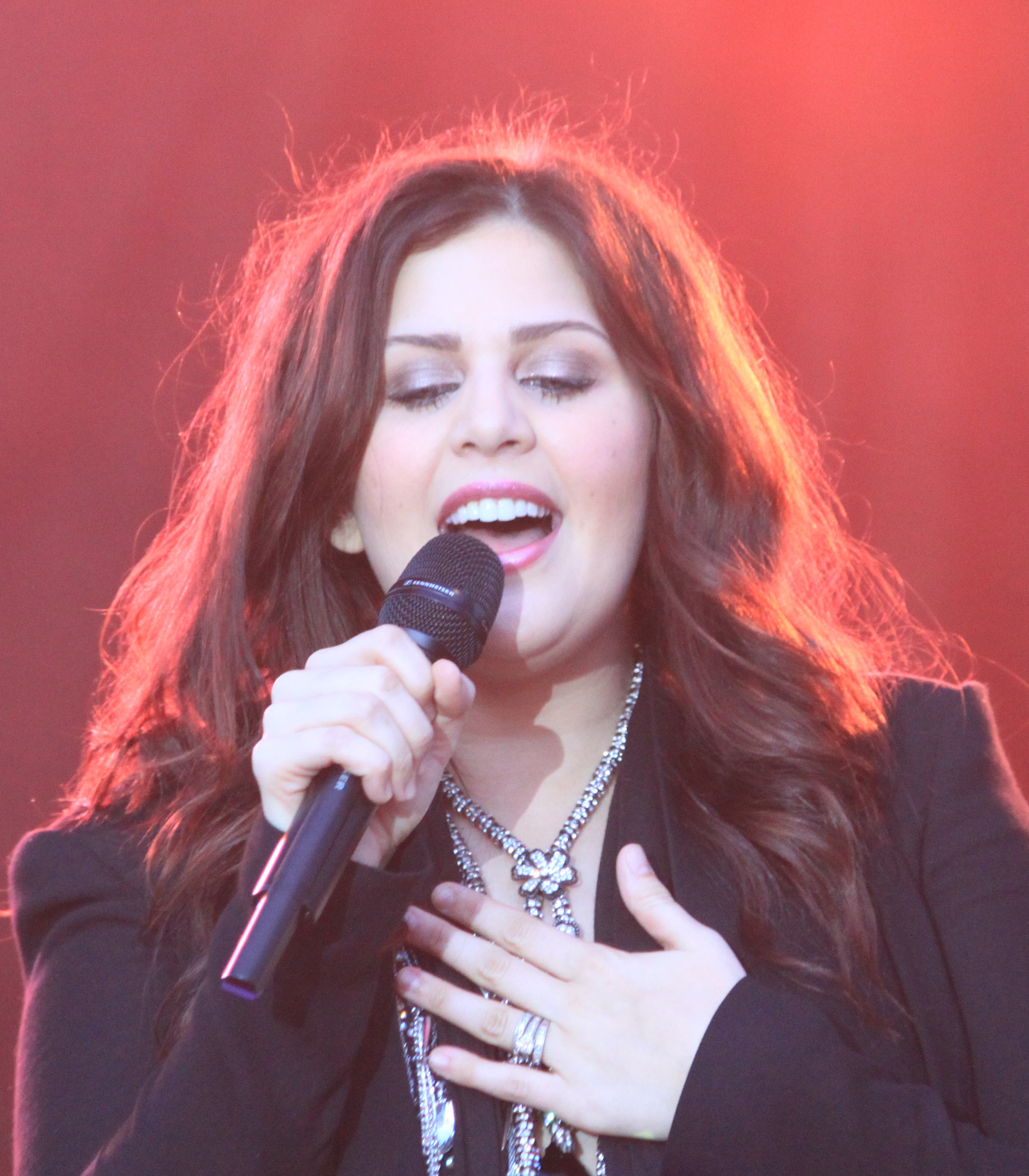
- Scott in 2012
- Born: Hillary Dawn Scott; April 1, 1986 (age 40); Nashville, Tennessee, U.S.
- Occupations: Singer; songwriter
- Years active: 2000–present
- Spouse: Chris Tyrrell (m. 2012)
- Children: 4
- Musical career
- Genres: Country; country pop; gospel/Christian
- Instrument: Vocals
- Label: Capitol Nashville
- Member of: Lady A
- Website: hillaryscott.com

Hillary Dawn Scott-Tyrrell (born April 1, 1986) is an American singer and songwriter who rose to fame as the co-lead vocalist of the country music group Lady A. She is signed to Big Machine Records.

In collaboration with her family, Scott released the gospel album Love Remains in 2016 as a solo artist. The album reached number 7 on the Billboard 200.

== Early life ==
Scott was born in Nashville, Tennessee, to country music artist Linda Davis and Lang Scott, a musician and entrepreneur. She has a younger sister named Rylee Jean, who was born in 2000. She is of Scottish and Native American descent. Scott was homeschooled on the road for kindergarten. She attended elementary school and high school at Donelson Christian Academy where she graduated in 2004. She lived with her grandparents during the time her parents were touring for her mother's musical career. After joining her mom on stage for a Christmas show, she was convinced to pursue a music career. Scott decided at age 14 to become a country singer, and her sister, Rylee, is 14 years younger than her; so she has a tattoo of the number 14 in honor of those two things.

== Career ==
After high school Hillary Scott attended Middle Tennessee State University. During her time at MTSU, Scott worked with singer-songwriter Victoria Shaw and earned some publicity, but was unable to secure a contract with a major label. She auditioned for American Idol twice, but failed to make it through to the judges round in both cases. Then she met future bandmates Charles Kelley and later, Dave Haywood, in May 2006. She ran into Kelley at a Nashville bar and recognized him from his MySpace page, where she had been listening to his music. She introduced herself to Kelley and complimented him on his music, which led to his deciding that they should get together with Haywood and write songs. The first song they wrote was "All We'd Ever Need". The song was originally written for her to perform; she convinced Kelley it should be a duet, which led to the forming of Lady Antebellum, now known as Lady A. The group first performed together in August 2006 and signed a record deal with Capitol Nashville in 2007. Scott says that being lead singer of Lady A, as opposed to being a solo artist, lessens the pressure on her on stage.

=== Lady Antebellum ===
Scott formed the country music group as Lady Antebellum in 2006, with co-lead singer Charles Kelley and backup singer Dave Haywood. They released their debut single, "Love Don't Live Here", on October 2, 2007, it entered Billboard's Hot Country Songs chart that year, peaking at No. 3 in early 2008. Their debut album was released on April 15, 2008, and debuted at No. 1 on the Top Country Albums chart. It consisted of eleven songs, ten of which were either written or co-written by the members of the trio, and was produced by Paul Worley and Victoria Shaw. The trio released their second single, "Lookin' for a Good Time", in mid-2008, it peaked at No. 11 in December of that year. Their third single, "I Run to You", became their first number one hit on the Hot Country Songs chart in July 2009. The album was certified platinum by the RIAA three months later, in October 2009.

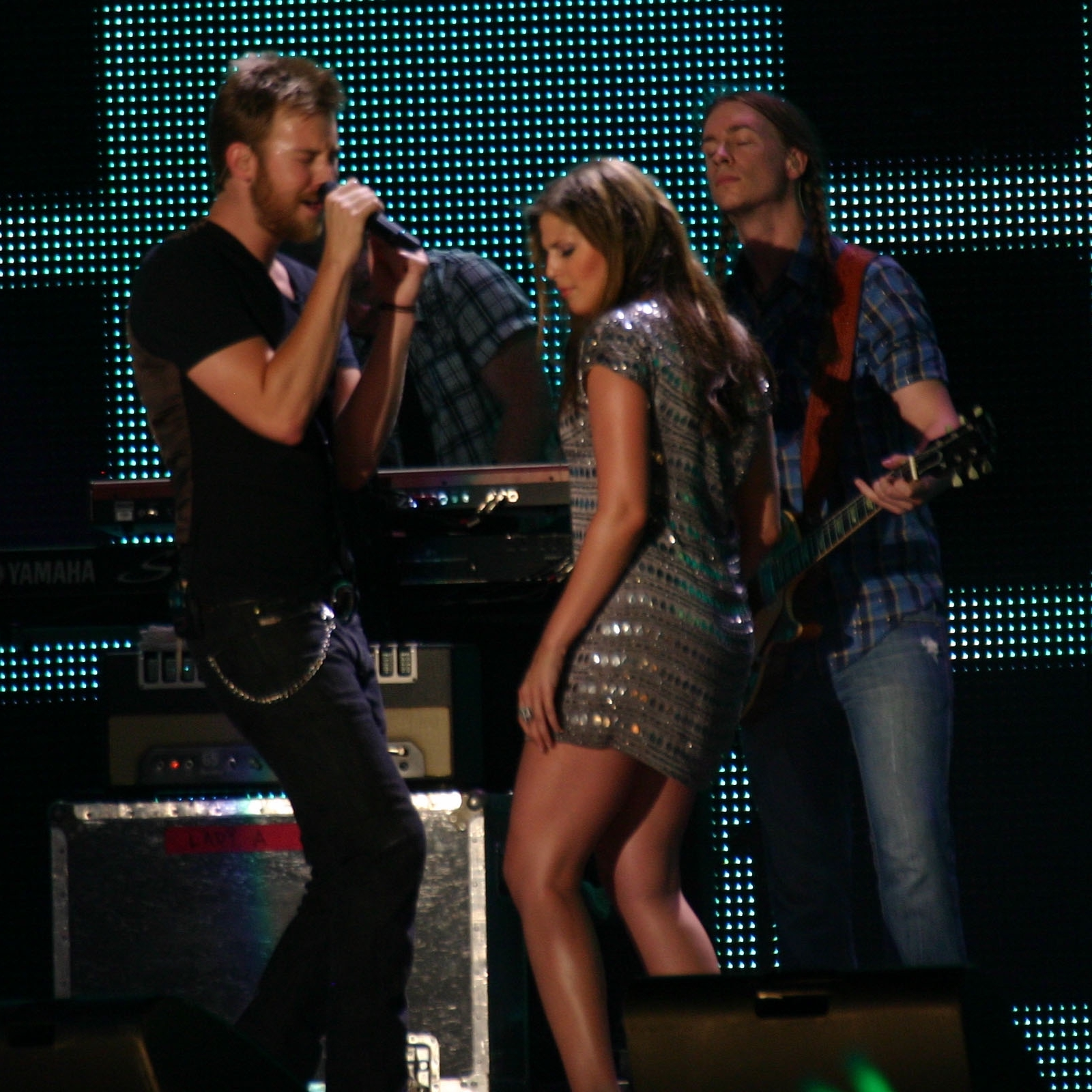
Scott performing with Lady A in 2008

In August 2009, the group released "Need You Now" as the lead single off their sophomore album of the same name. The song topped the Hot Country Songs chart for five weeks in late 2009 before peaking at No. 1 and No. 2 on the Adult Contemporary and Hot 100 charts, respectively, in early 2010. Need You Now was released on January 26, 2010, and debuted at No. 1 on Billboard's Top 200 Albums chart with first-week sales of almost 481,000 copies. The album consisted of eleven songs, eight of which were co-written by the members of the trio, and showcased production by both the trio and Worley. The next two singles from the album, "American Honey" and "Our Kind of Love", reached No. 1 on the country charts in April 2010 and September 2010, respectively. The album was certified triple platinum by the RIAA in October 2010. Its fourth and final single, "Hello World", peaked at No. 6 on the country charts in April 2011.

In May 2011, they released "Just a Kiss" as the first single from their third studio album, Own the Night, which was released on September 13, 2011, and became their fifth number one hit. "Just a Kiss" was 2x certified Platinum by the RIAA. It stayed on the Hot 100 for forty-two weeks. The second single "We Owned the Night" also became a number one hit and was certified Gold. The third single "Dancin' Away with My Heart" was also certified Gold and peaked at number two. "Wanted You More" was released as the fourth and final single from the album. It was their first single since "Lookin' For a Good Time" to miss the Top Ten. The band supported the album with their second headlining tour, the Own the Night Tour which was also their first arena and world tour.

On October 22, 2012, On This Winter's Night, the band first Christmas album was released. One of the tracks on the album "A Holly Jolly Christmas" was released to Country radio and AC radio. A music video for the single was made.

Shortly after the release of On This Winter's Night, the group started working on their fifth studio. Golden was released on May 7, 2013. "Downtown" was the album's first single and peaked at number two on Country radio and number one on the US Country Airplay chart. It was certified platinum by the RIAA. The second single was "Goodbye Town". In late 2013, the deluxe edition re-issue of Golden was released which included the third single "Compass". "Compass" was met with positive reviews and went number one on the Country Airplay chart. Throughout 2014, the band toured the album on the Take Me Downtown Tour.

In May 2014, "Bartender" was released as the first single off their sixth studio album. "Bartender" became their third number on the Country Airplay chart and is certified Platinum. 747 was released on September 30, 2014. "Freestyle" and "Long Stretch of Love" are the second and third singles off 747 respectively.

In October 2015, the group appeared on Good Morning America to announce that they would be taking some down time after their Wheels Up Tour finishes. Throughout 2016 they continued to play some shows together.

In January 2017, they released "You Look Good" which is the lead single off their upcoming seventh studio album Heart Break. The album was released on June 9, 2017, and will support it on the You Look Good Tour.

On June 11, 2020, amid the George Floyd protests, the band announced they would rename themselves "Lady A" in order to avoid racist connotations with Civil War history, as the original name was based on the Antebellum South. The band stated on social media that they were "deeply sorry for the hurt this has caused and for anyone who has felt unsafe, unseen or unvalued."

=== Hillary Scott & the Scott Family ===
In November 2015, it was reported that Scott was working on a gospel album. On April 22, 2016, she posted a handwritten note online about the project. In the note she expressed her excitement about it, announced the album's title, Love Remains and formally introduced "Hillary Scott & the Scott Family". On why making a gospel album she explains, "Well, I wanted to make this album to share more of who I am. These songs, and many like them are the cry of my heart. I have been singing songs like this my whole my life whether it be in church, with family and friends gathered around with guitars on my screened porch, rocking my baby girl to sleep or while holding the hand of a dying loved one." The album features original material penned by Scott as well as gospel standards and was produced by Ricky Skaggs. Scott's parents, Linda Davis and Lang Scott, and younger sister Rylee also appear on the album. The lead single "Thy Will" was released on April 22, 2016.

Love Remains debuted at number 7 on the Billboard 200. At the 59th Annual Grammy Awards, Love Remains won Best Contemporary Christian Album and "Thy Will" won Best Contemporary Christian Music Performance/Song.

=== Other projects ===
Scott's other works include singing background vocals on Luke Bryan's song, "Do I", which fellow Lady A bandmates, Charles Kelley and Dave Haywood, wrote alongside Bryan. The song was released to radio in April 2009 and peaked at No. 2 on Billboard's Hot Country Songs chart in December of that year.

Scott has recorded a duet with Dave Barnes called "Christmas Tonight" and was featured with Kelley and Haywood, as Lady Antebellum, on Maroon 5's "Out of Goodbyes". "Christmas Tonight" was a single off Barnes' 2010 holiday album, Very Merry Christmas, and peaked at No. 9 on the Adult Contemporary chart on New Year's Day, 2011. "Out of Goodbyes" was included on Maroon 5's 2010 album, Hands All Over, but was never released as a single.

In addition, Scott has co-written songs for other country artists, including Sara Evans' "A Little Bit Stronger" and Blake Shelton's "Suffocating". "A Little Bit Stronger" featured Scott on harmony vocals and was released in September 2010 as the lead off single to Evans' sixth studio album, Stronger. The song was widely used in the 2010 film, Country Strong, and topped the Hot Country Songs chart in May 2011 for two weeks, becoming Scott's first-ever Number One hit recorded by another artist. "Suffocating" was written by Scott with Shelton's ex-wife, Miranda Lambert, and recorded by Shelton for his 2010 EP, All About Tonight.

Scott appeared on season 4 of The Voice as a mentor for "Team Adam Levine". In 2016, she presented Gospel Hour for BBC Radio 2 Country.

== Personal life ==
Scott married Nashville-based drummer Chris Tyrrell on January 7, 2012. The two first met in college and reconnected when Lady A and fellow country music band Love and Theft, in which Tyrrell was the drummer at the time, both served as opening acts on Tim McGraw's Southern Voice tour in early 2010. They began dating in July 2010. After their relationship began, Tyrrell filled in for Lady A's drummer for a month in August 2010.

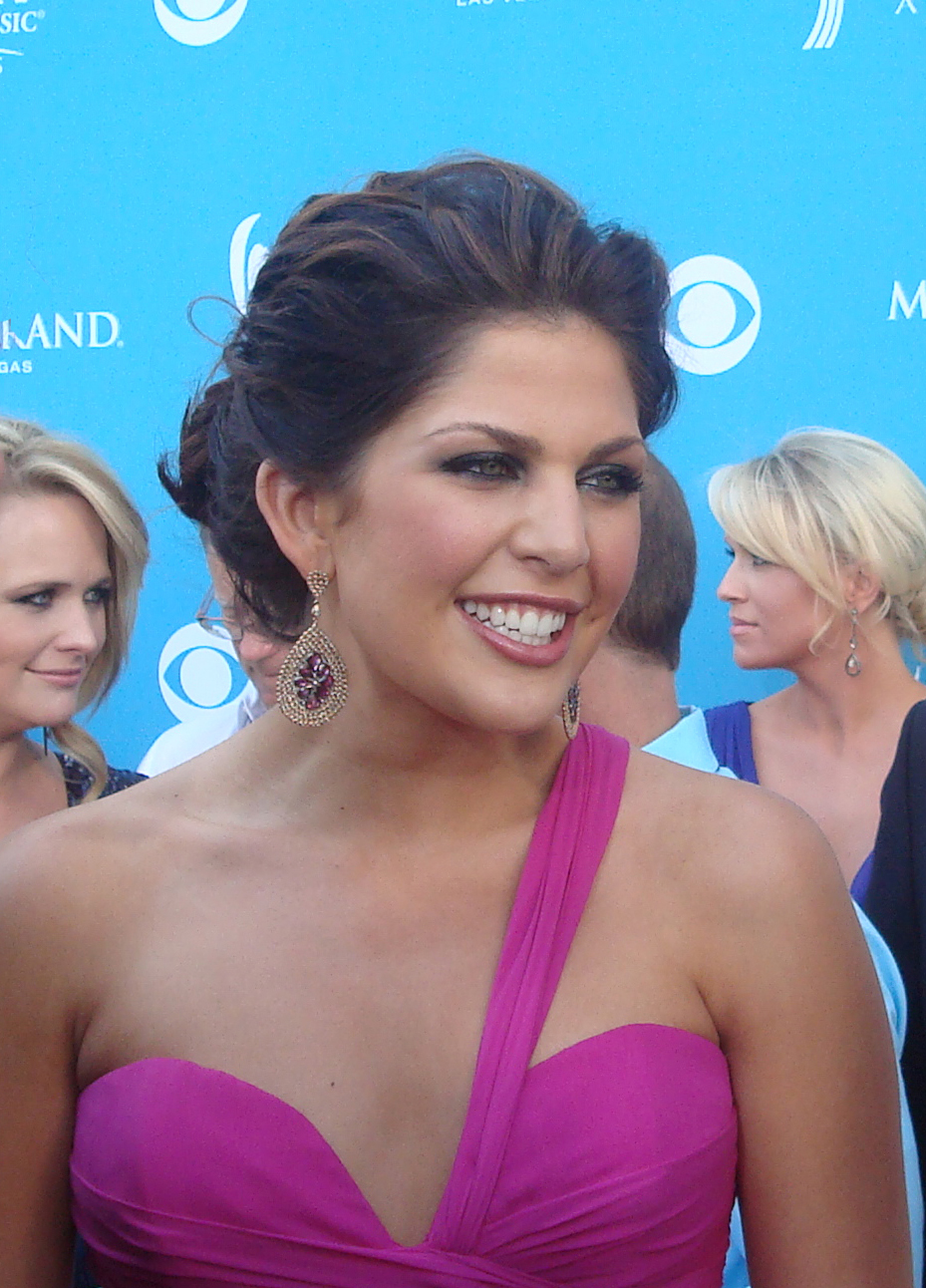
Scott in 2010

When Lady A released "Just a Kiss" in May 2011, Scott hinted that the song was inspired by her relationship with Tyrrell, saying, "We love writing songs from personal experience, and this is definitely one of those songs. There is so much excitement at the beginning of a new relationship ... all the butterflies and that optimistic feeling that this person could be 'the one.' This song is about one of those times when your brain kicks in and tells your heart 'good things are worth waiting for.'" Tyrrell proposed to Scott on July 2, 2011, during a family vacation in east Tennessee, and the couple wed in upstate New York on January 7, 2012. No wedding date had been announced, and on January 8, the couple posted a video on Lady A's website announcing that they were married. In October 2011, Tyrrell became a full-time member of the band as their new drummer.

Scott has two tattoos, a music note on her right foot and the number 14 on her right wrist. The 14 has two meanings. It represents the age at which she decided music is what she wanted to do for a living and the age difference between her and her younger sister Rylee Jean Scott.

In August 2012, Scott and Tyrrell purchased their first home together, a 7,600-square-foot (710 m^{2}), 6-bedroom and 8-bathroom home with a pool in Brentwood, Tennessee. Scott announced on December 7, 2012, that she and her husband were expecting their first child. In an interview with Broadway's Electric Barnyard, Scott said that the baby's heartbeat might be heard in the group's latest album, Golden. On July 22, 2013, she gave birth to her daughter, in Nashville, Tennessee. In 2015, she miscarried her second child, which inspired her single "Thy Will" on the album Love Remains. Scott's and Tyrrell's twin daughters were born on January 29, 2018. Their fourth daughter was born on July 25, 2025.

== Filmography ==
=== Television ===
Year	Title	Role	Notes
2013	The Voice	Herself	Advisor for Team Adam (season 4)
2020	Songland	Herself	Episode: "Lady Antebellum"
2024	Unsung Hero	Luanne Meece	

== Discography ==
=== With Lady A ===
- Lady Antebellum (2008)
- Need You Now (2010)
- Own the Night (2011)
- On This Winter's Night (2012)
- Golden (2013)
- 747 (2014)
- Heart Break (2017)
- Ocean (2019)
- What a Song Can Do (2021)

=== As solo musician ===
==== Studio albums ====
Title	Details	Peak chart positions					Sales
Title	Details	US	US Country	US Christ	AUS	CAN	Sales
Family Christmas (with Linda Davis and Lang Scott)	Release date: November 7, 2003; Label: Center Hill Records; Formats: CD, music download	—	—	—	—	—	
Love Remains (as Hillary Scott & the Scott Family)	Released: July 29, 2016; Label: EMI Records Nashville; Formats: CD, music download	7	2	1	81	69	US: 165,000
"—" denotes a collection that did not chart or was not released to that territory.

==== Singles ====
Year	Single	Peak positions				Sales	Album
Year	Single	US Bub.	US Country	US Christ.	US Christ. Air.	Sales	Album
2016	"Thy Will" (with the Scott Family)	12	27	1	1	US: 248,000	Love Remains
2017	"Still" (with the Scott Family)	—	—	20	21		Love Remains

==== Featured singles ====
Year	Single	Peak positions						Certifications	Album
Year	Single	US	US AC	US Country	US Country Air.	CAN Country	CAN	Certifications	Album
2010	"Christmas Tonight" (Dave Barnes featuring Hillary Scott)	—	9	—	—	—	—		Very Merry Christmas
2020	"Be a Light" (Thomas Rhett featuring Reba McEntire, Hillary Scott, Chris Tomlin and Keith Urban)	42	—	7	2	3	74	RIAA: Platinum	non-album single

=== Other charted songs ===
Year	Song	Peak positions	Album
Year	Song	US Christ.	Album
2016	"Beautiful Messes"	28	Love Remains
2016	"Love Remains"	38	Love Remains

=== Music videos ===
Year	Title	Director
2016	"Thy Will" (with the Scott Family)	Shane Drake

== Awards ==
Since 2008, Scott and Lady A have been awarded many top awards in the music industry. Some of the top accolades include nine Grammy awards, seven ACM awards, six CMA awards, one Billboard Music Award and CMT Artists of the Year honorees in 2010 and 2011 and 2018. Scott was also named SESAC songwriter of the year in 2008, 2010, and 2011. In 2011, her publishing company, Hillary Dawn Songs, shared publisher of the year with EMI Foray Music at the SESAC awards. She also has three Academy of Country Music awards, as producer of the album Need You Now, as producer of the single "Need You Now", and as songwriter for "Need You Now".

Year	Award	Recipient	Category	Result
2017	Grammy Awards	Love Remains	Best Contemporary Christian Music Album	Won
2017	Grammy Awards	"Thy Will"	Best Contemporary Christian Music Performance/Song	Won
2017	Billboard Music Awards	Hillary Scott & the Scott Family	Top Christian Artist	Nominated
2017	Billboard Music Awards	"Thy Will"	Top Christian Song	Won
2017	Billboard Music Awards	Love Remains	Top Christian Album	Nominated
2018	CMT Artists of the Year Awards	Hillary Scott	Honoree	Won
