= Dave Haywood =

American country musician and songwriter (born 1982)

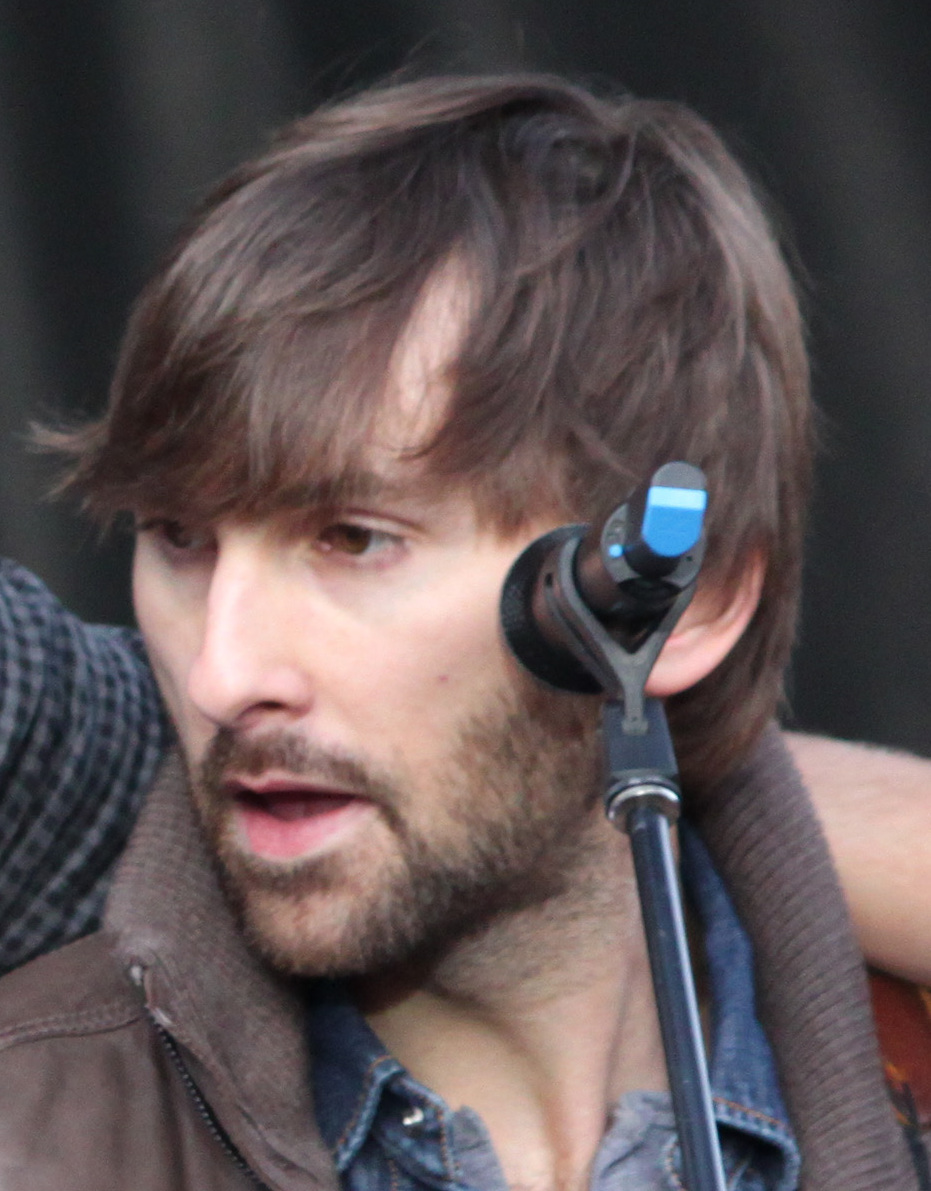
- Haywood in 2012
- Born: David Wesley Haywood; July 5, 1982 (age 44); Augusta, Georgia, U.S.
- Occupations: Musician; songwriter
- Years active: 2006 – present
- Spouse: Kelli Cashiola (m. 2012)
- Children: 3
- Musical career
- Genres: Country; country pop
- Instruments: Guitar; vocals; piano; mandolin; bouzouki; ukulele; banjo; harmonica
- Label: Capitol Nashville
- Member of: Lady A
- Website: ladyamusic.com

David Wesley Haywood (born July 5, 1982) is an American country musician and songwriter. He is one-third of the American country music band Lady A, in which he plays guitar, piano and mandolin, and sings backing vocals.

== Early life ==
Haywood's father, Van, is a dental instructor/dentist who invented a tooth-whitening method (originally discovered by Bill Klusmeier) and his mother, Angie, is a teacher. Both are involved in music in their church.

Haywood's mother taught him to play piano and his father taught him to play guitar. Their family sang and played instruments together as he was growing up. He also sang in Trinity-on-the-Hill United Methodist Church's youth choir called Love Unlimited where he served as the president during his senior year of high school.

Dave and his family lived in Chapel Hill, North Carolina, for about a decade when his father taught at the University of North Carolina at Chapel Hill's School of Dentistry. In 1993, the Haywoods moved back to Augusta. Haywood first met Charles Kelley at Riverside Middle School in Evans, Georgia. He was in a jazz band with Charles's brother Josh Kelley when he attended Lakeside High School and graduated in 2000. He attended college at the University of Georgia where he graduated in 2004. Haywood formed the country music group as Lady Antebellum in 2006, in Nashville, Tennessee along with Charles Kelley and Hillary Scott.

Besides writing for Lady Antebellum, Haywood co-wrote Luke Bryan's 2009 single "Do I" and the track "Love Song" on Miranda Lambert's album Revolution. In 2004, he engineered and produced, co-wrote and sang harmony vocals on a CD for Mary Bragg titled Certain Simple Things.

== Lady A ==
In 2005, Haywood would meet up with Kelley, his old middle school classmate, every other weekend in Atlanta, Georgia to write songs together. Kelley convinced Haywood to move to Nashville in 2006 to write songs together and to help Kelley to become a successful solo country artist. Haywood quit his job with Protiviti, Inc. in Atlanta and moved to Nashville to focus on music full-time. Shortly after, Hillary Scott recognized Kelley at a bar in Nashville from Kelley's MySpace page that Haywood had created. Kelley invited Scott to join him and Haywood to write songs together which led to them creating the new group, in which they named Lady Antebellum. Fans have since nicknamed the group Lady A. Haywood acted as the band's booking agent as they performed in bars and everywhere they could to get noticed. Haywood also created the band's first website.

The group made their debut in 2007 as guest vocalists on Jim Brickman’s single “Never Alone” before signing to Capitol Records Nashville. On October 2, 2007, they released the single, "Love Don't Live Here". It peaked at Number 3 on Billboard's Hot Country Songs chart in May 2008. Their self-titled debut album Lady Antebellum was released on April 15, 2008. On its first week of release, it became the first album by a new duo or group to debut at Number 1 on the Billboard Top Country Albums chart. They released their second single "Lookin' for a Good Time" in June 2008 and it peaked at Number 11 on Billboard's Hot Country Songs Chart in December 2008.

They also contributed to the AT&T Team USA Soundtrack with the song "I Was Here", which peaked at Number 24 based on downloads on the Bubbling Under Hot 100 chart. In addition, in December 2008, "Baby, It's Cold Outside" peaked at Number 3 on the Bubbling Under Hot 100 chart. In January 2009, their third official single, "I Run to You", was released. It became Lady A's first Number 1 in July 2009 on the Billboard Hot Country Songs chart. Their album Lady Antebellum was certified double platinum by RIAA.

Lady Antebellum released their fourth single "Need You Now" in August 2009 which is the title track of their second album Need You Now. The song became their second Number 1 on the Billboard Hot Country Songs chart in November 2009 and stayed on top for five weeks. It also peaked at Number 1 Billboard Adult Contemporary chart and Number 2 on Billboard Hot 100 chart in 2010. Their fifth single "American Honey" was released on January 11, 2010 and became their third Number 1 on Billboard Hot Country Songs chart in April 2010.

Their second album Need You Now was released on January 26, 2010, which debuted at Number 1 on Billboard Top Country Albums Chart and Number 1 on Billboard Top 100 Albums chart with first week sales of 480,922 copies. Need You Now has since been certified 5 times platinum by RIAA.

Their sixth single, "Our Kind of Love" was released in May 2010 and became their fourth Number 1 on Billboard Hot Country Songs chart in September 2010. Their seventh single "Hello World" was released in October 2010 and peaked at Number 6 on Billboard Hot Country Songs chart in April 2011.

On May 2, 2011, they released their eighth single, "Just a Kiss", which is the first single from their third album, Own the Night. " It debuted at Number 7 on Billboard Hot 100 chart, making it the highest debut for a country group in the chart's history and selling over 211,000 digital copies during its first week of release. "Just A Kiss" became their fifth Number 1 on Billboard Hot Country Songs in August 2011.

On September 13, 2011, they released their third album Own the Night, which debuted at Number 1 on Billboard Top Country Albums Chart and Number 1 on Billboard Top 100 Albums chart with first week sales of 347,479 copies.

On August 12, 2011, they released their ninth single "We Owned the Night" which is the second single from the Own the Night album. "We Owned the Night" peaked at Number 1 on the Billboard Hot Country Songs. The third single from Own the Night, "Dancin' Away with My Heart was released on December 12, 2011. It peaked at Number Two on the Billboard Hot Country Songs. Their eleventh single "Wanted You More" was released on May 7, 2012. The band supported the album with their second headlining tour, the Own the Night Tour which was also their first arena and world tour.

On October 22, 2012, On This Winter's Night, the band first Christmas album was released. One of the tracks on the album "A Holly Jolly Christmas" was released to Country radio and AC radio. A music video for the single was made.

Shortly after the release of On This Winter's Night, the group started working on their fifth studio. Golden was released on May 7, 2013. "Downtown" was the album's first single and peaked at number two on Country radio and number one on the US Country Airplay chart. It was certified platinum by the RIAA. The second single was "Goodbye Town". In late 2013, the deluxe edition re-issue of Golden was released which included the third single "Compass". "Compass" was met with positive reviews and went to number one on the Country Airplay chart. Throughout 2014, the band toured the album on the Take Me Downtown Tour.

In May 2014, "Bartender" was released as the first single off their sixth studio album. "Bartender" became their third number one hit on the Country Airplay chart and is certified Platinum. 747 was released on September 30, 2014. "Freestyle" and "Long Stretch of Love" are the second and third singles off 747 respectively.

In October 2015, they appeared on Good Morning America to announce they would be taking some down time after their Wheels Up Tour finished. They still continued to perform shows together throughout 2016.

In January 2017, they released "You Look Good", the lead single off their upcoming seventh studio album Heart Break. The album will be released on June 9, 2017, and will support it on the You Look Good Tour.

In June 2020, the band announced they were changing their name to Lady A in light of the original name's Confederate origins, as "Antebellum" refers to the period before the Civil War.

== Personal life ==
On December 19, 2011, Haywood became engaged to Kelli Cashiola after seven months of dating. Haywood and Cashiola married on April 14, 2012, in Nashville, Tennessee On April 21, 2014, the couple announced that they were expecting a baby boy in September Their son, Cash Van Haywood, was born on September 7, 2014. Their second child, a daughter, Lillie Renee, was born on December 22, 2017.
