= Charles Kelley =

American country singer (born 1981)

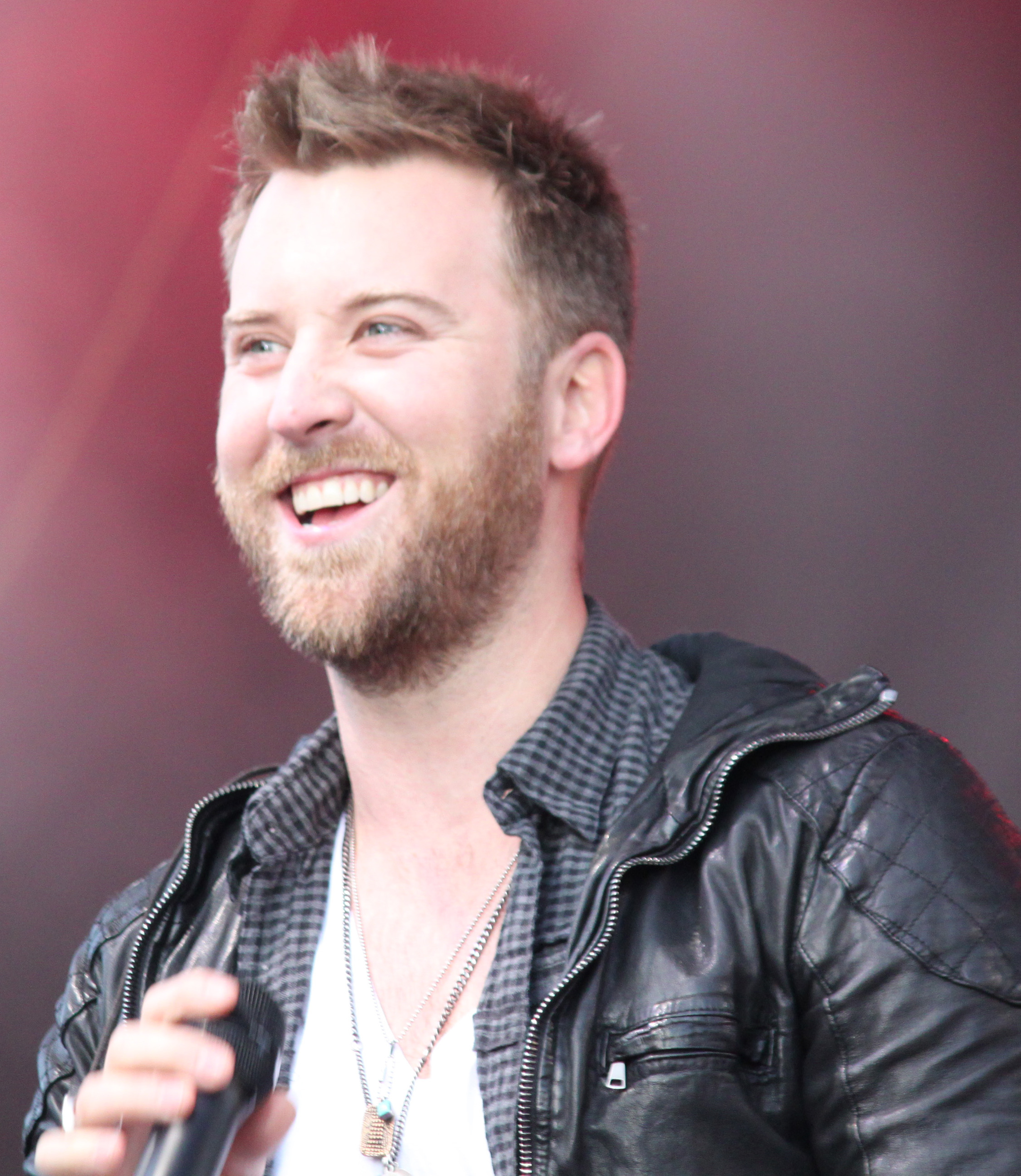
- Kelley performing in 2012
- Born: Charles Burgess Kelley; September 11, 1981 (age 45); Augusta, Georgia, U.S.
- Occupations: Musician; singer
- Years active: 1995–present
- Spouse: Cassie McConnell (m. 2009)
- Children: 2
- Musical career
- Genres: Country; country pop
- Instruments: Vocals; drums; guitar; ukulele; percussion; keyboards
- Labels: Capitol Nashville; Big Machine; Southern Accent
- Member of: Lady A
- Website: charleskelley.com

Charles Burgess Kelley (born September 11, 1981) is an American country music singer who is the co-lead vocalist and founding member of the country music trio Lady A, which was formed in 2006 and are signed to Big Machine Records. He has also released two solo albums.

== Early life and career ==
Kelley was born in Augusta, Georgia, the youngest of three sons of Gayle and John W. Kelley, a now retired cardiologist. He began his musical career at the age of 11. His older brother, Josh Kelley, is also a musician and singer. As teenagers, Charles, Josh and oldest brother John formed a band called Inside Blue; the band released a five-song CD that received attention of a major label. In middle school, Kelley met Dave Haywood and, at the age of 14, they wrote their first song. They both graduated from Lakeside High School in Evans, Georgia.

Kelley attended the University of Georgia in Athens, Georgia, where he was a member of the Nu Zeta chapter of the Lambda Chi Alpha fraternity. He graduated in 2004 with a degree in finance.

Before moving to Nashville, Tennessee, in mid-2005 to pursue a musical career, Kelley worked in his brother John's construction business in Winston-Salem, North Carolina, as an accountant for an affiliated waste management company. Kelley started his music career after his brother Josh, who was a pop musician at the time, bought a house in Nashville and convinced him to come live there so they could write songs together.

== Musical career ==
=== Lady A ===
Kelley, Hillary Scott, and Dave Haywood founded the country music group Lady A as Lady Antebellum in 2006 and released their debut album in April 2008. The trio either wrote or co-wrote ten of the eleven songs on the album, which featured production by Paul Worley and Victoria Shaw. The album included the trio's debut hit, "Love Don't Live Here", along with the singles, "Lookin' for a Good Time" and "I Run to You", which became their first number one hit on Billboard's Hot Country Songs chart in July 2009. It was certified platinum by the RIAA in October 2009. In 2008, they returned to Charles' and Dave's former high school alma mater, Lakeside High School, and performed a short concert in the gymnasium.

In January 2010, they released their second album, Need You Now, which included the five-week number one and crossover hit, "Need You Now". It also peaked at number two on the all-genre Billboard Hot 100 and is 6× certified Platinum. All three members of the band co-wrote eight of the eleven songs on the album and produced alongside Worley. The album generated the number one hits, "American Honey" and "Our Kind of Love", and the top ten single, "Hello World", and was certified triple platinum in October 2010.

In May 2011, the group released "Just a Kiss" as the lead single from their third studio album, Own the Night, which was released on September 13, 2011, and became their fifth number one hit on the Hot Country Songs chart. "Just a Kiss" was certified 2× Platinum by the RIAA. It charted on the Hot 100 for 42 weeks. The second single "We Owned the Night" also became a number one hit and was certified Gold. The third single "Dancin' Away with My Heart" was also certified Gold and peaked at number two. "Wanted You More" was released as the fourth and final single from the album. It was their first single since "Lookin' for a Good Time" to miss the top ten. The band supported the album with their second headlining tour, the Own the Night Tour which was also their first arena and world tour.

On October 22, 2012, On This Winter's Night, the band's first Christmas album was released. One of the tracks on the album "A Holly Jolly Christmas" was released to Country radio and AC radio. A music video for the single was released.

Shortly after the release of On This Winter's Night, they started working on their fifth studio album. Golden was released on May 7, 2013. "Downtown" was the album's first single and peaked at number two on Country radio and number one on the US Country Airplay chart. It was certified platinum by the RIAA. The second single was "Goodbye Town". In late 2013, the deluxe edition reissue of Golden was released which included the third single "Compass". "Compass" was met with positive reviews and went number one on the Country Airplay chart. In 2014, the band toured the album on the Take Me Downtown Tour and sold-out shows every night.

In May 2014, "Bartender" was released as the first single off their sixth studio album. "Bartender" became their third number on the Country Airplay chart and is certified Platinum. 747 was released on September 30, 2014. "Freestyle" and "Long Stretch of Love" are the second and third singles off 747 respectively.

In October 2015, the group appeared on Good Morning America to announce they would go on hiatus from performing at the conclusion of their Wheels Up Tour. They continued to do shows together throughout 2016.

In January 2017, Lady Antebellum released "You Look Good", the lead single off their seventh studio album Heart Break. The album was released on June 9, 2017, and supported it on the You Look Good Tour.

In June 2020, the band changed their name to Lady A in light of the original name's Confederate origins.

=== Solo career ===
During the band's break, Kelley focused on a solo project and said that Lady Antebellum is his priority but he wanted to try working alone out. On September 28, 2015, he released his debut solo single "The Driver" which features Dierks Bentley and Eric Paslay. Kelley revealed on GMA that he started working on his solo project six months prior to his single's release. "The Driver" received a Grammy nomination for Best Country Duo/Group Performance for the 58th Annual Grammy Awards. His solo debut studio album The Driver was released on February 5, 2016. He released his second solo album, Songs for a New Moon on June 25, 2025.

=== Other projects ===
Kelley's other works consist of co-writing songs for other artists, mainly with Lady A bandmate, Dave Haywood. One of those songs was "Do I" on labelmate Luke Bryan's 2009 album, Doin' My Thing. Written in late 2008, the song was released to radio in April 2009 and peaked at number two on Billboard's Hot Country Songs chart in December of that year. The song also featured Lady Antebellum's Hillary Scott on background vocals.

In 2006, prior to forming the band, Kelley released a solo album called 2 to 9's.

In 2009, Kelley and Haywood penned a song called "It's Only" for Danny Gokey's debut album, My Best Days, with "I Run to You" cowriter, Tom Douglas. That same year, the two also wrote "Love Song" with Blake Shelton and Miranda Lambert, which Lambert would later record for her third studio album, Revolution, and Kelley would sing background on.

In 2010, Kelley and Haywood wrote "Kiss Me Slowly" with Will Anderson, lead singer of the pop rock band, Parachute. The song made it on to Parachute's second studio album, The Way It Was, and was released to iTunes in the weeks leading up to the release of the album. That same year, Kelley, along with Scott and Haywood, recorded a duet with Maroon 5 called "Out of Goodbyes" as Lady Antebellum. The song was included on Maroon 5's third studio album, Hands All Over, but was never released as a single.

In addition, Kelley has co-written numerous songs for his brother, Josh Kelley. Those songs are "Just Say the Word" and "Pop Game" on Josh's 2006 album, Just Say the Word, which were written by the brothers with Haywood; "Lift Me Up" and "Stay Awake" on 2008's Special Company; and "Georgia Clay" and "Ain't Lettin' Go" on his 2011 country debut, Georgia Clay.

Kelley and Haywood co-wrote the semi-autobiographical track "Better Than This" on (Encore), the 2013 re-issue of country singer Hunter Hayes' self-titled debut album.

== Personal life ==
Kelley is married to music representative Cassie McConnell. The couple married in a Nashville courthouse in late June 2009 as a legal formality before having a destination wedding in the Bahamas. After the wedding, Lady A tweeted a photo of Kelley showing off his wedding ring, saying, "What is that you see on Charles' hand... yep a wedding ring!!!" McConnell represents several country musicians, including her brother-in-law, Josh Kelley. The couple officially married on July 6, 2009. On August 7, 2015, the couple announced that McConnell was pregnant with their first child due in February 2016. On August 28, 2015, his wife Cassie appeared on Good Morning America to reveal her fertility struggle and also announced that the child would be a boy. Their first son, Ward, was born on February 11, 2016. Their second son, Archer was born on September 16, 2025.

As a result of his brother Josh's marriage, Kelley is the brother in-law of actress Katherine Heigl.

Kelley had the lyrics, "All your life, you were only waiting for this moment to arise," from The Beatles song, "Blackbird", tattooed on his right forearm in early 2009. In 2010, Kelley had a second tattoo, a design of the "flower of life", on his upper left arm.

In addition to being an avid golfer, Kelley is a motorcycle enthusiast and owns a 2006 Harley Softail Custom.

In August 2022, Lady A announced that they were postponing their Request Line Tour to 2023, so that Kelley could focus on his sobriety. On December 23, 2022, Kelley released "As Far As You Could", a song about his struggles with alcohol.

=== Health ===
In September 2026, Kelley revealed that he had been diagnosed with multiple myeloma, a rare form of blood cancer, after going to the doctor for rib fractures.

== Discography ==
- Lady Antebellum (2008)
- Need You Now (2010)
- Own the Night (2011)
- On This Winter's Night (2012)
- Golden (2013)
- 747 (2014)
- Heart Break (2017)
- Ocean (2019)
- What a Song Can Do (2021)
- On This Winter's Night Vol.2 (2025)

=== Studio albums ===
Title	Album details	Peak chart positions				Sales
Title	Album details	US	US Country	AUS	CAN	Sales
The Driver	Release date: February 5, 2016; Label: Capitol Nashville; Format: CD, digital download	35	2	35	43	US: 38,000
Songs for a New Moon	Release date: June 25, 2025; Label: Southern Accent; Format: CD, digital download	—	—	—	—	

=== Singles ===
Year	Single	Peak chart positions			Sales	Album
Year	Single	US AC	US Country	US Country Airplay	Sales	Album
2015	"The Driver" (featuring Dierks Bentley and Eric Paslay)	—	37	44	US: 61,000	The Driver
2016	"Lonely Girl"	—	—	52		The Driver
2022	"Georgia On My Mind"	—	—	—		Non-album singles
2022	"As Far as You Could"	—	—	—		Non-album singles
2025	"Old Piano" (with Alyssa Bonagura)	—	—	—		Non-album singles
2025	"Can't Lose You"/"Here with Me"	11 —	— —	— —		TBA
2025	"Driving and Listening to Music"/"Run"	— —	— —	— —		TBA
2026	"Can't Be Alone Tonight"	21	—	—		TBA

=== Other charted songs ===
Year	Single	Peak positions	Album
Year	Single	US Country	Album
2016	"The Only One Who Gets Me"	39	The Driver

=== Guest singles ===
Year	Single	Artist	US Country Airplay	Certifications	Album
2017	"Young Americans"	Colt Ford (with Josh Kelley)	—		Love Hope Faith
2018	"Straight to Hell"	Darius Rucker (with Jason Aldean and Luke Bryan)	40	RIAA: Gold	When Was the Last Time
2024	"How Do You Do That"	Karley Scott Collings (featuring Josh Kelley)	—		
2025	"Nothing On"	Kelleigh Brannen (featuring Josh Kelley)	—		

=== Music videos ===
Year	Video	Director
2015	"The Driver" (featuring Dierks Bentley and Eric Paslay)	TK McKamy
2016	"Lonely Girl"	Shaun Silva
2017	"Young Americans" (with Josh Kelley and Colt Ford)	Wayne Miller
2018	"Straight to Hell" (with Darius Rucker, Luke Bryan and Jason Aldean)	TK McKamy

== Awards and nominations ==
=== with Lady A ===
Since Lady A won the Country Music Association Awards New Artist of the Year award in 2008, they have accumulated seven more awards, including their first Grammy in 2010 for Best Country Performance by Duo or Group with Vocals. At the 2009 CMAs, the group ended Rascal Flatts' six-year reign as Vocal Group of the Year. At the 2010 CMAs, the group became the first artist in CMA Award history to receive the Single of the Year honor for two consecutive years.

At the 53rd Annual Grammy Awards, the trio won the Song of the Year. They won Top Vocal Group at the 2012 Academy of Country Music Awards on April 1, 2012.

=== Solo career ===
Year	Awards	Award	Outcome
2016	Grammy Awards	Best Country Duo/Group Performance – "The Driver" (with Dierks Bentley and Eric Paslay)	Nominated
