= Need You Now (Lady Antebellum song) =

2009 song by Lady Antebellum

- US single cover

Single by Lady Antebellum

from the album Need You Now
- Released: August 11, 2009
- Studio: Warner Studios (Nashville, TN)
- Genre: Country
- Length: 4:37 (album version); 3:56 (single version)
- Label: Capitol Nashville
- Songwriters: Hillary Scott; Charles Kelley; Dave Haywood; Josh Kear
- Producers: Lady A; Paul Worley

Lady Antebellum singles chronology
"I Run to You" (2009)	"Need You Now" (2009)	"American Honey" (2010)

Alternative cover
- International single cover

Music video
- "Lady Antebellum - Need You Now" on YouTube

"Need You Now" is a song recorded by American country music trio Lady Antebellum (now known as Lady A). The band co-wrote the song with Josh Kear, and produced it with Paul Worley. It served as the lead single and title track to their second studio album of the same name, and was first released in the US on August 11, 2009, and it features lead vocals from both Scott and Kelley. The song also served as their debut single in the UK and Europe, where it was released May 3, 2010. It won four Grammy Awards in 2011, including for Song of the Year and Record of the Year.

The song spent five weeks at No. 1 on the Billboard Hot Country Songs chart in late 2009. Thereafter, "Need You Now" crossed over onto various pop and adult contemporary music charts, becoming a top five hit in Canada, Ireland, and New Zealand, as well as a top ten hit in the Netherlands and Norway. The song won Single of the Year and Song of the Year at the 2010 Academy of Country Music Awards, as well as Group Video of the Year at the 2010 CMT Music Awards. For the chart week of March 30, 2010, the song became the group's highest-charting single on the Billboard Hot 100, reaching No. 2, the best position for a country song by a band on that chart since Lonestar's "Amazed" topped the tally at the beginning of the decade. It spent 60 weeks on the chart. The single has been certified 12× platinum by the Recording Industry Association of America (RIAA).

A music video was shot for the song, directed by Dave McClister. In the video the song has an extended piano intro, and features all members of the group acting out scenes related to the storyline. The song was initially released only to the country radio format in the United States and Canada on August 24, 2009, but was remixed and re-released to all other formats domestically and internationally at the beginning of 2010. The song gained prominence internationally, in Europe and South America. The trio re-recorded the song again in Simlish to accompany the release of the Sims 3 expansion pack Ambitions. By April 17, 2011, the song became the ninth most downloaded song in history, moving five million copies, and surpassed Taylor Swift's "Love Story" as the most downloaded country song in history. It has since sold over 6 million copies in the US.

== Content ==
The lyrics describe placing a call to someone in the middle of the night due to being lonely and longing for companionship. Hillary Scott commented on the song, saying that "All three of us know what it's like to get to that point where you feel lonely enough that you make a late-night phone call that you very well could regret the next day." Charles Kelley told The Boot that the band's record executives initially had concerns regarding using the lyrics "I'm a little drunk", but he convinced the executives to leave the content in the song.

== Music video ==
David McClister directed the "Need You Now" music video, using a treatment he wrote in 10 minutes.

The video features all three members of Lady Antebellum acting out scenes pertaining to the storyline. It begins in a hallway of a hotel where Charles Kelley is sitting against a wall and Hillary Scott is in her room, with Dave Haywood playing the piano. Kelley goes to a cafe and has a coffee, where Haywood arrives with his love interest. Scott then leaves her room and hails a taxi. Kelley leaves the cafe and goes outside to walk to a costume ball, to which Scott is also traveling. When they arrive at the ball, they both see their love interests wearing masks and embrace them. Haywood soon arrives at the ball with his love interest. The video ends with all three members embracing their love interests. The video was filmed at the King Edward Hotel in Toronto, Ontario.

Of the changes between the song and its music video, one of the most noted is Kelley drinking coffee instead of whiskey, since the song states the character is intoxicated. In response, McClister admitted he simply did not want the video to be a literal adaptation of the song, as he felt sitting in a diner in the middle of the night was lonelier.

== Chart performance ==
"Need You Now" (2010)
A 27-second sample of Lady Antebellum's "Need You Now." The song is a country ballad.

The song became the trio's second number one hit on the Hot Country Songs chart dated November 28, 2009, where it stayed for five weeks, making it the first song to hold the number one position for more than four weeks since Taylor Swift's "Our Song" spent six weeks at number one between December 2007 and January 2008. No other song would spend more than four weeks at number one until January 2016, when Thomas Rhett's "Die a Happy Man" spent six weeks at the top.

In the Billboard Hot 100 chart, the song peaked at number two and stayed there for two weeks, making it their highest-charting single on that chart and their first Top 5. The song also peaked at No. 2 on the Canadian Hot 100, making it their highest-charting and first Top 5 single there as well. "Need You Now" is only the second country song to reach number one on the Billboard Adult Top 40 chart, the first being Faith Hill's "Breathe", which reached that same position in 2000. For the Billboard tracking period of March 29 – April 4, 2010, "Need You Now" broke the record held by Hoobastank's hit "The Reason" for most spins in one week on the Adult Top 40 chart. The song debuted at No. 28 on the UK Singles Chart in its first week of release. It was covered in a live performance for Queen Elizabeth II's Diamond Jubilee Concert in June 2012 by English singers Gary Barlow and Cheryl Cole which saw the song re-enter the UK Charts. Over a month later, it climbed to No. 15, its highest UK chart position and after 53 weeks in the chart.

On December 9, 2010, the song was named the No. 2 Hot 100 song of the year by Billboard, behind "Tik Tok" by Kesha, marking the highest position a country song has ever reached since Faith Hill's "Breathe" was ranked No. 1 in the year-end chart of the year 2000.

In April 2011, "Need You Now" replaced Taylor Swift's "Love Story" as the best-selling country song of all time in the U.S. It is also the second country song to sell over 5 million digital copies (after Swift's "Love Story"). It has sold over 6 million copies by January 2013, the first country song to do so. As of June 2016, it had sold 6.7 million units in the U.S.

Due to the band winning four Grammys, "Need You Now" debuted at No. 32 on the German Singles Chart in February 2011, 10 months after the digital release of the single. Before that, the song did not sell enough to enter the chart.

== Critical reception ==
"Need You Now" has received critical acclaim from music critics and is considered one of the best country songs of the 2000s. It won the 2011 Grammy Award for Record of the Year and Song of the Year.

The song received a "thumbs up" review from Jim Malec of the 9513. He said that although Charles Kelley's voice had a "surprisingly stuffy tone," lead singer Hillary Scott's voice fit perfectly for "dark" songs like "Need You Now." He said that both singers had a rawness in their voices that made the song feel "real".

The track received a positive review from Ken Tucker of Billboard, who said, "the song finds alto Scott trading lead vocals with a soulful Kelley, and it will connect with anyone who's ever dumped a significant other and regretted it in the early morning hours."

Bobby Peacock of Roughstock gave a positive review as well, comparing its sound favorably to that of "I Run to You." He also thought the traded-off lead vocals gave the song "more depth," and that Kelley and Scott sang more strongly than on the debut album.

Critics in Europe and North America have pointed to similarities between "Need You Now" and "Eye in the Sky" by the Alan Parsons Project.

== Cover versions and live performances ==
In December 2010, Adele and Darius Rucker performed the song at the CMT Artists of the Year.

In February 2011, Lea Michele and Mark Salling covered the song during the second season of Glee during the episode The Sue Sylvester Shuffle.

Gary Barlow and Cheryl performed the song at the Diamond Jubilee Concert at Buckingham Palace on June 4, 2012.

Mia Silva performed a Portuguese-language cover version entitled "Preciso de Voce" on her 2011 album Saudade Magoa.

In 2017, Shane Filan of Westlife included a version of the song on his album Love Always. This was released as a promotional single in East Asia (with a new arrangement and a duet with Filipino bossa nova artist Sitti), and it charted on iTunes Top Songs in Laos, the Philippines, Indonesia, Vietnam, Cambodia, and Malaysia.

== Track listing ==
- Digital download
1. "Need You Now" – 3:57
- Other versions
- "Need You Now" (Jason Nevins Elektrotek radio edit) – 3:31
- "Need You Now" (Jason Nevins Hands Up radio edit) – 3:33
- "Need You Now" (Jason Nevins Rhythmic radio edit) – 3:29
- "Need You Now" (DJ Dark Intensity remix) – 4:22
- 52nd Annual Grammy Awards
- "Need You Now"
- 53rd Annual Grammy Awards
- "If You Don't Know Me by Now/American Honey/Need You Now"

== Credits and personnel ==
Adapted from the album liner notes.

- Chad Cromwell – drums
- Jason "Slim" Gambill – electric guitar
- Dave Haywood – background vocals, acoustic guitar
- Charles Kelley – lead vocals
- Rob McNelley – electric guitar (solo)
- Michael Rojas – piano, synthesizer
- Hillary Scott – lead vocals
- Paul Worley – acoustic guitar, electric guitar
- Craig Young – bass guitar

== Awards and nominations ==
Year	Association	Category	Result
2010	Academy of Country Music	Single Record of the Year	Won
2010	Academy of Country Music	Song of the Year	Won
2010	Academy of Country Music	Video of the Year	Nominated
2010	CMT Music Awards	Group Video of the Year	Won
2010	CMT Music Awards	Video of the Year	Nominated
2010	Teen Choice Awards	Choice Music: Country Song	Nominated
2010	Country Music Association Awards	Single of the Year	Won
2010	Country Music Association Awards	Music Video of the Year	Nominated
2010	American Country Awards	Single of the Year	Won
2010	American Country Awards	Single by a Duo/Group	Won
2010	American Country Awards	Music Video of the Year	Nominated
2010	American Country Awards	Video by Duo/Group	Won
2011	Grammy Awards	Record of the Year	Won
2011	Grammy Awards	Song of the Year	Won
2011	Grammy Awards	Best Country Performance by a Duo or Group with Vocals	Won
2011	Grammy Awards	Best Country Song	Won

== Charts ==
=== Weekly charts ===
Chart (2009–2012)	Peak position
Australia (ARIA)	27
Austria (Ö3 Austria Top 40)	18
Belgium (Ultratop 50 Flanders)	13
Belgium (Ultratop 50 Wallonia)	37
Canada Hot 100 (Billboard)	2
Canada AC (Billboard)	1
Canada CHR/Top 40 (Billboard)	6
Canada Country (Billboard)	1
Canada Hot AC (Billboard)	1
Denmark (Tracklisten)	17
France (SNEP)	56
Finland (Suomen virallinen lista)	12
Germany (GfK)	32
Ireland (IRMA)	3
Israel International Airplay (Media Forest)	1
Japan (Japan Hot 100)	12
Netherlands (Dutch Top 40)	7
Netherlands (Single Top 100)	7
New Zealand (Recorded Music NZ)	5
Norway (VG-lista)	8
Scottish Singles Sales (Official Charts)	17
Slovakia Airplay (ČNS IFPI)	11
Spain (Promusicae)	30
Sweden (Sverigetopplistan)	13
Switzerland (Schweizer Hitparade)	11
UK Singles (Official Charts)	15
US Billboard Hot 100	2
US Adult Contemporary (Billboard)	1
US Adult Pop Airplay (Billboard)	1
US Dance Club Songs (Billboard)	15
US Dance Airplay (Billboard)	9
US Hot Country Songs (Billboard)	1
US Pop Airplay (Billboard)	2

=== Monthly charts ===
Chart (2010)	Position
Brazil (Brasil Hot 100 Airplay)	15
Brazil (Brasil Hot Pop Songs)	4

=== Year-end charts ===
Chart (2009)	Position
US Country Songs (Billboard)	48

Chart (2010)	Position
Canada (Canadian Hot 100)	9
Japan Adult Contemporary (Billboard Japan)	11
Japan (RIAJ Digital Track Chart)	80
Netherlands (Dutch Top 40)	29
Netherlands (Single Top 100)	18
New Zealand (Recorded Music NZ)	48
Sweden (Sverigetopplistan)	49
Switzerland (Schweizer Hitparade)	50
US Billboard Hot 100	2
US Adult Contemporary (Billboard)	1
US Adult Top 40 (Billboard)	3
US Country Songs (Billboard)	48
US Mainstream Top 40 (Billboard)	24

Chart (2011)	Position
US Adult Contemporary (Billboard)	29

Chart (2012)	Position
UK Singles (OCC)	94

=== Decade-end charts ===
Chart (2010–2019)	Position
US Billboard Hot 100	68

== Certifications ==
Region	Certification	Certified units/sales
Australia (ARIA)	3× Platinum	210,000^{^}
Brazil (Pro-Música Brasil)	Diamond	250,000^{‡}
Denmark (IFPI Danmark)	Platinum	90,000^{‡}
Germany (BVMI)	Gold	150,000^{‡}
New Zealand (RMNZ)	4× Platinum	120,000^{‡}
Spain (Promusicae)	Gold	30,000^{‡}
Sweden (GLF)	Platinum	40,000^{‡}
United Kingdom (BPI)	3× Platinum	1,800,000^{‡}
United States (RIAA)	12× Platinum	12,000,000^{‡} / 6,700,000
^{^} Shipments figures based on certification alone.^{‡} Sales+streaming figures based on certification alone.

== Release history ==
Region	Date	Format	Label	Ref.
United States	August 11, 2009	Digital download	Capitol Nashville	
United States	August 24, 2009	Country radio	Capitol Nashville	
United States	January 3, 2010	Adult contemporary radio	Capitol Nashville; Capitol	
United States	January 24, 2010	Hot adult contemporary radio	Capitol Nashville; Capitol	
Germany	April 23, 2010	Digital download	Capitol Nashville	
Italy	April 23, 2010	Digital download	Capitol Nashville	
United Kingdom	May 3, 2010	Digital download	Parlophone	
Canada	December 29, 2010	Digital download (Jason Nevins Dance Remix)	Capitol Nashville	
United States	December 29, 2010	Digital download (Jason Nevins Dance Remix)	Capitol Nashville	

== See also ==
- List of best-selling singles
- List of best-selling singles in the United States
- List of Billboard Adult Contemporary number ones of 2010
