= List of Lady A concert tours =

The following is a comprehensive list of American country music group, Lady A's concert tours. Lady A has embarked on eight headlining concerts tours, one co-headlining concert tour, and one Las Vegas residency.

== Need You Now Tour ==
The Need You Now Tour was the first headlining concert tour by Lady Antebellum, supporting their sophomore studio album Need You Now. The tour began on September 20, 2010. David Nail was the opening act.

== Own the Night Tour ==
Own the Night Tour
- Tour by Lady Antebellum
- Associated album: Own the Night
- Start date: November 11, 2011
- End date: October 3, 2012
- Legs: 5
- No. of shows: 85 in North America; 12 in Europe; 7 in Australia; 104 total

Lady Antebellum concert chronology
- Need You Now Tour (2010); Own the Night Tour (2011–12); Take Me Downtown Tour (2013)

The Own the Night Tour was the second headlining concert tour by Lady Antebellum, supporting their third studio album Own the Night. It began on November 11, 2011, in Knoxville, Tennessee and ended on October 3, 2012, in Sydney, Australia. This was their first world tour visiting Europe and Australia.

=== Background ===
The tour was announced on August 15, 2011. The second leg of the tour was announced on October 18, 2011. The tour visited North America, Europe and Australia.

=== Opening acts ===
- Frankie Ballard (England & Ireland)
- The Band Perry (Australia)
- Luke Bryan (Australia & North America leg 3)
- Edens Edge (North America leg 1)
- Gloriana (Australia & North America leg 2)
- Josh Kelley (North America leg 1)
- Randy Montana (North America leg 1)
- Kacey Musgraves (England & Ireland)
- David Nail (filled in for Thompson Square in Detroit and Evansville)
- Thomas Rhett (North America leg 3)
- Darius Rucker (North America leg 2)
- Thompson Square (North America leg 2)

=== Setlist ===
2011 Setlist
1. "We Owned the Night"
2. "Stars Tonight"
3. "Our Kind of Love"
4. "Dancin' Away With My Heart"
5. "Wanted You More"
6. "Love Don't Live Here"
7. "When You Were Mine"
8. "Hello World"
9. "American Honey"
10. "Midnight Rider" (The Allman Brothers Band cover, performed w/the opening acts)
11. "Singing Me Home"
12. "As You Turn Away"
13. "Just a Kiss"
14. "Perfect Day"
15. "I Run to You"
16. "Need You Now"

Encore

17. "Lookin' for a Good Time"
2012 Setlist
1. "We Owned the Night"
2. "Stars Tonight"
3. "Our Kind of Love"
4. "Dancin' Away with My Heart"
5. "Wanted You More"
6. "Perfect Day"
7. "Love Don't Live Here"
8. "Just a Kiss"
9. "Hello World"
10. "Midnight Rider" (The Allman Brothers Band cover)
11. "American Honey"
12. "I Run to You"
13. "Lookin' for a Good Time"

Encore

14. "Need You Now"

=== Tour dates ===
Date	City	Country	Venue	Opening acts
North America Leg 1
November 11, 2011	Knoxville	United States	Knoxville Civic Coliseum	Josh Kelley; Randy Montana; Edens Edge
November 12, 2011	Macon	United States	Macon Centerplex	Josh Kelley; Randy Montana; Edens Edge
November 13, 2011	Pikeville	United States	Eastern Kentucky Expo Center	Josh Kelley; Randy Montana; Edens Edge
November 16, 2011	El Paso	United States	El Paso County Coliseum	Josh Kelley; Randy Montana; Edens Edge
November 17, 2011	Phoenix	United States	Grand Canyon University	Josh Kelley; Randy Montana; Edens Edge
November 18, 2011	Las Vegas	United States	The Joint	Josh Kelley; Randy Montana; Edens Edge
November 25, 2011	Huntsville	United States	Von Braun Civic Center	Josh Kelley; Randy Montana; Edens Edge
November 26, 2011	Florence	United States	Florence Civic Center	Josh Kelley; Randy Montana; Edens Edge
November 27, 2011	Savannah	United States	Savannah Civic Center	Josh Kelley; Randy Montana; Edens Edge
December 1, 2011	Colorado Springs	United States	Colorado Springs World Arena	Josh Kelley; Randy Montana; Edens Edge
December 2, 2011	Lubbock	United States	City Bank Coliseum	Josh Kelley; Randy Montana; Edens Edge
December 3, 2011	Wichita Falls	United States	Kay Yeager Coliseum	Josh Kelley; Randy Montana; Edens Edge
December 4, 2011	Belton	United States	Bell County Expo Center	Josh Kelley; Randy Montana; Edens Edge
December 8, 2011	La Crosse	United States	La Crosse Center	Josh Kelley; Randy Montana; Edens Edge
December 9, 2011	Sioux City	United States	Tyson Events Center	Josh Kelley; Randy Montana; Edens Edge
December 10, 2011	Springfield	United States	JQH Arena	Josh Kelley; Randy Montana; Edens Edge
December 11, 2011	Murray	United States	CFSB Center	Josh Kelley; Randy Montana; Edens Edge
December 15, 2011	Amherst	United States	Mullins Center	Josh Kelley; Randy Montana; Edens Edge
December 16, 2011	Uncasville	United States	Mohegan Sun Arena	Josh Kelley; Randy Montana; Edens Edge
December 17, 2011	Roanoke	United States	Roanoke Civic Center	Josh Kelley; Randy Montana; Edens Edge
December 18, 2011	Morgantown	United States	WVU Coliseum	Josh Kelley; Randy Montana; Edens Edge
North America Leg 2
January 27, 2012	Tulsa	United States	BOK Center	Darius Rucker; Thompson Square
January 28, 2012	Des Moines	United States	Wells Fargo Arena	Darius Rucker; Thompson Square
January 29, 2012	Bloomington	United States	U.S. Cellular Coliseum	Darius Rucker; Thompson Square
February 3, 2012	Huntington	United States	Big Sandy Superstore Arena	Darius Rucker; Thompson Square
February 4, 2012	State College	United States	Bryce Jordan Center	Darius Rucker; Thompson Square
February 14, 2012	Salt Lake City	United States	EnergySolutions Arena	Darius Rucker; Thompson Square
February 15, 2012	Denver	United States	Pepsi Center	Darius Rucker; Thompson Square
February 18, 2012	Dallas	United States	American Airlines Center	Darius Rucker; Thompson Square
February 22, 2012	Nashville	United States	Bridgestone Arena	Darius Rucker; Thompson Square
February 25, 2012	Auburn Hills	United States	The Palace of Auburn Hills	Darius Rucker; David Nail; Gloriana
February 26, 2012	Evansville	United States	Ford Center	Darius Rucker; David Nail; Gloriana
March 2, 2012	New Orleans	United States	Lakefront Arena	Darius Rucker; Thompson Square
March 3, 2012	Columbus	United States	Columbus Civic Center	Darius Rucker; Thompson Square
March 9, 2012	Rosemont	United States	Allstate Arena	Darius Rucker; Thompson Square
March 10, 2012	Council Bluffs	United States	Mid-America Center	Darius Rucker; Thompson Square
March 11, 2012	Minneapolis	United States	Target Center	Darius Rucker; Thompson Square
March 13, 2012	Winnipeg	Canada	MTS Centre	Darius Rucker; Thompson Square
March 14, 2012	Saskatoon	Canada	Credit Union Centre	Darius Rucker; Thompson Square
March 16, 2012	Calgary	Canada	Scotiabank Saddledome	Darius Rucker; Thompson Square
March 17, 2012	Edmonton	Canada	Rexall Place	Darius Rucker; Thompson Square
March 19, 2012	Vancouver	Canada	Pacific Coliseum	Darius Rucker; Thompson Square
March 20, 2012	Seattle	United States	KeyArena	Darius Rucker; Thompson Square
March 21, 2012	Eugene	United States	Matthew Knight Arena	Darius Rucker; Thompson Square
March 23, 2012	San Jose	United States	HP Pavilion at San Jose	Darius Rucker; Thompson Square
March 24, 2012	Chula Vista	United States	Cricket Wireless Amphitheatre	Darius Rucker; Thompson Square
March 27, 2012	Los Angeles	United States	Staples Center	Darius Rucker; Thompson Square
March 28, 2012	Fresno	United States	Save Mart Center	Darius Rucker; Thompson Square
March 29, 2012	Sacramento	United States	Power Balance Pavilion	Darius Rucker; Thompson Square
April 5, 2012	Moline	United States	iWireless Center	Darius Rucker; Thompson Square
April 6, 2012	Kansas City	United States	Sprint Center	Darius Rucker; Thompson Square
April 7, 2012	Norman	United States	Lloyd Noble Center	Darius Rucker; Thompson Square
May 3, 2012	New York City	United States	Radio City Music Hall	Darius Rucker; Thompson Square
May 4, 2012	New York City	United States	Radio City Music Hall	Darius Rucker; Thompson Square
May 5, 2012	Worcester	United States	DCU Center	Darius Rucker; Thompson Square
May 6, 2012	Hershey	United States	Giant Center	Darius Rucker; Thompson Square
May 10, 2012	Jacksonville	United States	Jacksonville Veterans Memorial Arena	Darius Rucker; Thompson Square
May 11, 2012	Tampa	United States	1-800-ASK-GARY Amphitheatre	Darius Rucker; Thompson Square
May 12, 2012	West Palm Beach	United States	Cruzan Amphitheatre	Darius Rucker; Thompson Square
May 16, 2012	Louisville	United States	KFC Yum! Center	Darius Rucker; Thompson Square
May 18, 2012	Hartford	United States	Comcast Theatre	Darius Rucker; Thompson Square
May 19, 2012	Camden	United States	Susquehanna Bank Center	Darius Rucker; Thompson Square
May 20, 2012	Columbia	United States	Merriweather Post Pavilion	Darius Rucker; Thompson Square
May 22, 2012	Augusta	United States	James Brown Arena	Darius Rucker; Thompson Square
May 23, 2012	Augusta	United States	James Brown Arena	Darius Rucker; Thompson Square
May 31, 2012	Cincinnati	United States	Riverbend Music Center	Darius Rucker; Thompson Square
June 1, 2012	Cuyahoga Falls	United States	Blossom Music Center	Darius Rucker; Thompson Square
June 2, 2012	Burgettstown	United States	First Niagara Pavilion	Darius Rucker; Thompson Square
June 3, 2012	Hopewell	United States	Marvin Sands Performing Arts Center	Darius Rucker; Thompson Square
June 8, 2012	Raleigh	United States	Time Warner Cable Music Pavilion	Darius Rucker; Thompson Square
June 9, 2012	Charlotte	United States	Verizon Wireless Amphitheatre	Darius Rucker; Thompson Square
June 10, 2012	Virginia Beach	United States	Farm Bureau Live	Darius Rucker; Thompson Square
June 13, 2012	Bethel	United States	Bethel Woods Center for the Arts	Darius Rucker; Thompson Square
June 14, 2012	Montreal	Canada	Bell Centre	Darius Rucker; Thompson Square
June 15, 2012	Ottawa	Canada	Scotiabank Place	Darius Rucker; Thompson Square
June 16, 2012	Toronto	Canada	Molson Canadian Amphitheatre	Darius Rucker; Thompson Square
June 21, 2012	Birmingham	United States	Verizon Wireless Music Center	Darius Rucker; Thompson Square
June 22, 2012	Duluth	United States	Arena at Gwinnett Center	Darius Rucker; Thompson Square
June 23, 2012	Greenville	United States	Bi-Lo Center	Darius Rucker; Thompson Square
June 24, 2012	Noblesville	United States	Klipsch Music Center	Darius Rucker; Thompson Square
June 27, 2012	North Little Rock	United States	Verizon Arena	Darius Rucker; Thompson Square
June 28, 2012	Southaven	United States	Snowden Grove Amphitheatre	Darius Rucker; Thompson Square
June 29, 2012	Maryland Heights	United States	Verizon Wireless Amphitheatre	Darius Rucker; Thompson Square
June 30, 2012	Milwaukee	United States	Summerfest	Darius Rucker; Thompson Square
Europe
July 11, 2012	Dublin	Ireland	Olympia Theatre	Kacey Musgraves; Miranda Lambert; Jake Owen; The Band Perry
July 13, 2012	Glasgow	Scotland	Clyde Auditorium	Kacey Musgraves; Miranda Lambert; Jake Owen; The Band Perry
July 14, 2012	London	England	Hyde Park	Kacey Musgraves; Miranda Lambert; Jake Owen; The Band Perry
July 15, 2012	Manchester	England	O_{2} Apollo Manchester	Kacey Musgraves; Miranda Lambert; Jake Owen; The Band Perry
July 16, 2012	London	England	Hammersmith Apollo	Kacey Musgraves; Miranda Lambert; Jake Owen; The Band Perry
July 17, 2012	Birmingham	England	O_{2} Academy Birmingham	Kacey Musgraves; Miranda Lambert; Jake Owen; The Band Perry
July 19, 2012	Zürich	Switzerland	Kunsteisbahn Dolder	Kacey Musgraves; Miranda Lambert; Jake Owen; The Band Perry
July 20, 2012	Frankfurt	Germany	Jahrhunderthalle	Kacey Musgraves; Miranda Lambert; Jake Owen; The Band Perry
July 21, 2012	Munich	Germany	Tollwood Festival	Kacey Musgraves; Miranda Lambert; Jake Owen; The Band Perry
July 23, 2012	Copenhagen	Denmark	Falconer Theatre	Kacey Musgraves; Miranda Lambert; Jake Owen; The Band Perry
July 24, 2012	Gothenburg	Sweden	Tradgarn	Kacey Musgraves; Miranda Lambert; Jake Owen; The Band Perry
July 26, 2012	Seljord	Norway	Countryfestivalen	Kacey Musgraves; Miranda Lambert; Jake Owen; The Band Perry
July 27, 2012	Stockholm	Sweden	Cirkus	Kacey Musgraves; Miranda Lambert; Jake Owen; The Band Perry
North America Leg 3
September 22, 2012	Honolulu	United States	Neal S. Blaisdell Center	Luke Bryan; Thomas Rhett; Jake Owen
Australia
September 25, 2012	Melbourne	Australia	Palais Theatre	Luke Bryan; The Band Perry; Jake Owen
September 26, 2012	Melbourne	Australia	Palais Theatre	Luke Bryan; The Band Perry; Jake Owen
September 28, 2012	Brisbane	Australia	Brisbane Convention & Exhibition Centre	Luke Bryan; The Band Perry; Jake Owen
September 29, 2012	Brisbane	Australia	Brisbane Convention & Exhibition Centre	Luke Bryan; The Band Perry; Jake Owen
October 1, 2012	Sydney	Australia	Sydney Opera House	Luke Bryan; The Band Perry; Thomas Rhett
October 2, 2012	Sydney	Australia	Sydney Opera House	Gloriana
October 3, 2012	Sydney	Australia	Sydney Opera House	Gloriana

Touring band

- Clint Chandler – Mandolin
- Dennis Edwards – Bass guitar
- Jason "Silm" Gambill – Guitar
- Jonathan Long – Accordion, musical director, piano, tambourine
- Chris Tyrrell – Drums

=== Tour documentary ===
The tour documentary was filmed on June 27, 2012, in North Little Rock, Arkansas at the Verizon Arena.

=== Critical reception ===
Mike Hammond, Program Director for WIVK out of Knoxville says, "Lady A has taken their tour to the next level." Their energy, enthusiasm, stage presence, big screen, the music, the stage, etc.This is definitely on the must see list this fall."

== Take Me Downtown Tour ==
Take Me Downtown Tour
- Tour by Lady Antebellum
- Associated album: Golden
- Start date: January 10, 2014
- End date: September 28, 2014
- Legs: 1
- No. of shows: 72 total

Lady Antebellum concert chronology
- Own the Night Tour (2011–12); Take Me Downtown Tour (2014); Wheels Up Tour (2015)

The Take Me Downtown Tour was the third headlining tour by Lady Antebellum. The tour began on January 10, 2014, in Peoria, Illinois and ended on September 28, 2014, in the Dominican Republic. The first leg of the tour was announced in July 2013 and the second leg was announced on August 27, 2013. The tour was in support of their fifth studio album, Golden.

The first leg of the tour was originally going to begin on November 8, 2013, but was postponed until January 10, 2014. Lady Antebellum's comment about the postponement was, "To accommodate the new release and in order give you guys the best show possible, we've had to move things around on our tour schedule." The first leg visited sixty cities. It was also announced on the Lady Antebellum site on January 17, 2014, that the tour would be extended to eighty dates. Those dates were added to the summer portion of the tour. On May 19, 2014, it was announced that the group would headline a show on the beach in Atlantic City, New Jersey on August 3 as part of free beach concerts.

=== Opening acts ===
- Kip Moore (winter dates)
- Kacey Musgraves (winter/spring dates)
- Billy Currington (select summer dates)
- Jana Kramer (select winter dates)
- Joe Nichols (select summer dates)
- David Nail (select dates)
- Alex & Sierra (Atlantic City

=== Setlist ===
The following setlist is representative of the shows on select dates. It is not representative of all shows for the duration of the tour.

North America leg 1 setlist
1. "Compass" (start on "B stage")
2. Better Off Now (That You're Gone)"
3. "Our Kind of Love"
4. "Get to Me"
5. "Just a Kiss"
6. "Love Don't Live Here"
7. "American Honey"
8. "It Ain't Pretty"
9. "I Run to You"
10. "Dancin' Away with My Heart"
11. "Wanted You More"
12. "Goodbye Town"
13. "Hello World"
14. "And the Radio Played"
15. "Fly Away in the Morning" (with that evening's openers)
16. "Downtown"
17. "Lookin' for a Good Time"
18. "We Owned the Night"

Encore

19. "Need You Now"
20. "Wake Me Up" (Avicii cover)
21. "Cups" (Anna Kendrick cover)
North America leg 2 setlist
1. "Compass"
2. "Better Off Now (That You're Gone)"
3. "Our Kind of Love"
4. "Bartender"
5. "Just a Kiss"
6. "Perfect Day"
7. "American Honey"
8. "It Ain't Pretty"
9. "I Run to You"
10. "Dancin' Away with My Heart" (start of acoustic set on "B" stage)
11. "Wanted You More"
12. "Goodbye Town"
13. "Hello World"
14. "Love Don't Live Here" (back to main stage)
15. "It's a Great Day to Be Alive" (Travis Tritt cover)
16. "Downtown"
17. "Lookin' for a Good Time"
18. "We Owned the Night"

Encore

19. "Need You Now"
20. "Wake Me Up" (Avicii cover)
21. "Cups" (Anna Kendrick cover)

=== Tour dates ===
Date	City	Country	Venue	Opening acts	Attendance	Revenue
North America leg 1
January 10, 2014	Peoria	United States	Peoria Civic Center	Kip Moore; Kacey Musgraves; Thomas Rhett; Lauren Alaina	—N/a	—N/a
January 11, 2014	Toledo	United States	Huntington Center	Kip Moore; Kacey Musgraves; Thomas Rhett; Lauren Alaina	—N/a	—N/a
January 12, 2014	Roanoke	United States	Roanoke Civic Center	Kip Moore; Kacey Musgraves; Thomas Rhett; Lauren Alaina	—N/a	—N/a
January 18, 2014	Fargo	United States	Fargodome	Kip Moore; Kacey Musgraves; Thomas Rhett; Lauren Alaina	—N/a	—N/a
January 19, 2014	Rapid City	United States	Rushmore Plaza Civic Center	Kip Moore; Kacey Musgraves; Thomas Rhett; Lauren Alaina	—N/a	—N/a
January 23, 2014	Denver	United States	Pepsi Center	Kip Moore; Kacey Musgraves; Thomas Rhett; Lauren Alaina	—N/a	—N/a
January 24, 2014	Salt Lake City	United States	EnergySolutions Arena	Kip Moore; Kacey Musgraves; Thomas Rhett; Lauren Alaina	—N/a	—N/a
January 25, 2014	Bozeman	United States	Brick Breeden Fieldhouse	Kip Moore; Kacey Musgraves; Thomas Rhett; Lauren Alaina	8,109 / 8,109	$426,711
January 30, 2014	Philadelphia	United States	Wells Fargo Center	Kip Moore; Kacey Musgraves; Thomas Rhett; Lauren Alaina	—N/a	—N/a
January 31, 2014	Boston	United States	TD Garden	Kip Moore; Kacey Musgraves; Thomas Rhett; Lauren Alaina	10,921 / 10,921	$673,922
February 1, 2014	Uncasville	United States	Mohegan Sun Arena	Kip Moore; Kacey Musgraves; Thomas Rhett; Lauren Alaina	7,044 / 7,044	$531,856
February 7, 2014	Minneapolis	United States	Target Center	Kip Moore; Kacey Musgraves; Thomas Rhett; Lauren Alaina	10,590 / 10,590	$490,744
February 9, 2014	Grand Rapids	United States	Van Andel Arena	Kip Moore; Kacey Musgraves; Thomas Rhett; Lauren Alaina	9,731 / 9,731	$392,479
February 13, 2014	St. Louis	United States	Chaifetz Arena	Kip Moore; Kacey Musgraves; Thomas Rhett; Lauren Alaina	7,000 / 7,500	$336,227
February 14, 2014	Wichita	United States	Intrust Bank Arena	Kip Moore; Kacey Musgraves; Thomas Rhett; Lauren Alaina	—N/a	—N/a
February 15, 2014	Kansas City	United States	Sprint Center	Kip Moore; Kacey Musgraves; Thomas Rhett; Lauren Alaina	—N/a	—N/a
February 21, 2014	Fairfax	United States	Patriot Center	Kip Moore; Kacey Musgraves; Thomas Rhett; Lauren Alaina	6,973 / 6,973	$380,539
February 22, 2014	Greenville	United States	Bon Secours Wellness Arena	Kip Moore; Kacey Musgraves; Thomas Rhett; Lauren Alaina	8,320 / 8,320	$362,909
February 26, 2014	Rosemont	United States	Allstate Arena	Kip Moore; Kacey Musgraves; Thomas Rhett; Lauren Alaina	8,500 / 8,500	$431,269
February 28, 2014	Toronto	Canada	Air Canada Centre	Kip Moore; Kacey Musgraves; Thomas Rhett; Lauren Alaina	9,090 / 9,090	$653,946
March 1, 2014	London	Canada	Budweiser Gardens	Kip Moore; Kacey Musgraves; Thomas Rhett; Lauren Alaina	8,070 / 8,070	$559,036
March 5, 2014	Winnipeg	Canada	MTS Centre	Kip Moore; Kacey Musgraves; Thomas Rhett; Lauren Alaina	—N/a	—N/a
March 6, 2014	Saskatoon	Canada	Credit Union Centre	Kip Moore; Kacey Musgraves; Thomas Rhett; Lauren Alaina	—N/a	—N/a
March 7, 2014	Edmonton	Canada	Rexall Place	Kip Moore; Kacey Musgraves; Thomas Rhett; Lauren Alaina	—N/a	—N/a
March 8, 2014	Calgary	Canada	Scotiabank Saddledome	Kip Moore; Kacey Musgraves; Thomas Rhett; Lauren Alaina	—N/a	—N/a
March 10, 2014	Vancouver	Canada	Pacific National Exhibition	Kip Moore; Kacey Musgraves; Thomas Rhett; Lauren Alaina	—N/a	—N/a
March 12, 2014	Boise	United States	Taco Bell Arena	Kip Moore; Kacey Musgraves; Thomas Rhett; Lauren Alaina	6,602 / 6,602	$365,150
March 14, 2014	Reno	United States	Reno Events Center	Kip Moore; Kacey Musgraves; Thomas Rhett; Lauren Alaina	5,947 / 5,947	$506,207
March 15, 2014	Ontario	United States	Citizens Business Bank Arena	Kip Moore; Kacey Musgraves; Thomas Rhett; Lauren Alaina	8,285 / 8,285	$486,795
March 16, 2014	Fresno	United States	Save Mart Arena	Kip Moore; Kacey Musgraves; Thomas Rhett; Lauren Alaina	10,102 / 10,102	$374,000
March 21, 2014	Las Vegas	United States	Mandalay Bay Events Center	Kip Moore; Kacey Musgraves; Thomas Rhett; Lauren Alaina	—N/a	—N/a
March 22, 2014	Chula Vista	United States	Sleep Train Amphitheatre	Kip Moore; Kacey Musgraves; Thomas Rhett; Lauren Alaina	—N/a	—N/a
March 23, 2014	Phoenix	United States	Ak-Chin Pavilion	Kip Moore; Kacey Musgraves; Thomas Rhett; Lauren Alaina	—N/a	—N/a
March 27, 2014	Omaha	United States	CenturyLink Center Omaha	Kip Moore; Kacey Musgraves; Thomas Rhett; Lauren Alaina	—N/a	—N/a
March 28, 2014	Tulsa	United States	BOK Center	Kip Moore; Kacey Musgraves; Thomas Rhett; Lauren Alaina	8,423 / 8,423	$400,413
March 29, 2014	Austin	United States	Frank Erwin Center	Kip Moore; Kacey Musgraves; Thomas Rhett; Lauren Alaina	—N/a	—N/a
April 10, 2014	Evansville	United States	Ford Center	Kip Moore; Kacey Musgraves; Thomas Rhett; Lauren Alaina	—N/a	—N/a
April 11, 2014	Atlanta	United States	Aaron's Amphitheatre	Kip Moore; Kacey Musgraves; Thomas Rhett; Lauren Alaina	—N/a	—N/a
April 12, 2014	Birmingham	United States	Oak Mountain Amphitheatre	Kip Moore; Kacey Musgraves; Thomas Rhett; Lauren Alaina	—N/a	—N/a
North America leg 2
April 25, 2014	Raleigh	United States	Walnut Creek Amphitheatre	Billy Currington; Kacey Musgraves; Lauren Alaina; Justin Moore	—N/a	—N/a
April 26, 2014	Charlotte	United States	PNC Music Pavilion	Billy Currington; Kacey Musgraves; Lauren Alaina; Justin Moore	—N/a	—N/a
April 27, 2014	Knoxville	United States	Thompson–Boling Arena	Billy Currington; Kacey Musgraves; Lauren Alaina; Justin Moore	8,121 / 8,121	$303,957
May 30, 2014	Cincinnati	United States	Riverbend Music Center	Billy Currington; Joe Nichols; Brett Eldredge	—N/a	—N/a
May 31, 2014	Cuyahoga Falls	United States	Blossom Music Center	Billy Currington; Joe Nichols; Brett Eldredge	—N/a	—N/a
June 15, 2014	Mountain View	United States	Shoreline Amphitheater	Billy Currington; Joe Nichols; Brett Eldredge	—N/a	—N/a
June 20, 2014 (Note: The show on June 20, 2014, was a part of Country Jam USA.)	Mack	United States	Country Jam USA	Billy Currington; Joe Nichols; Brett Eldredge	—N/a	—N/a
June 21, 2014	Sheridan	United States	Trails End Concert Park	Billy Currington; Joe Nichols; Brett Eldredge	—N/a	—N/a
June 27, 2014 (Note: The show on June 27, 2014 was a part of Nebraskaland Days.)	North Platte	United States	Nebraskaland Days	Billy Currington; Joe Nichols; Brett Eldredge	—N/a	—N/a
July 4, 2014 (Note: The show on July 4, 2014, was a part of the Cavendish Beach Music Festival.)	Cavendish	Canada	Cavendish Beach Music Festival	Billy Currington; Joe Nichols; Brett Eldredge	—N/a	—N/a
July 6, 2014	Ottawa	Canada	Ottawa Bluesfest	Billy Currington; Joe Nichols; Brett Eldredge	—N/a	—N/a
July 19, 2014 (Note: The show on July 19, 2014, was a part of Cheyenne Frontier Days.)	Cheyenne	United States	Cheyenne Frontier Days	Billy Currington; Joe Nichols; Brett Eldredge	—N/a	—N/a
July 22, 2014 (Note: The show on July 22, 2014, was a part of the California Mid State Fair.)	Paso Robles	United States	California Mid State Fair	Billy Currington; Joe Nichols; Brett Eldredge	—N/a	—N/a
July 24, 2014	Noblesville	United States	Klipsch Music Center	Billy Currington; Joe Nichols; Brett Eldredge	—N/a	—N/a
July 25, 2014 (Note: The show on July 25, 2014, was a part of the Ohio State Fair.)	Columbus	United States	Celeste Center	Billy Currington; Joe Nichols; Brett Eldredge	—N/a	—N/a
July 26, 2014 (Note: The show on July 26, 2014, was a part of the Delaware State Fair.)	Harrington	United States	Delaware State Fair	Billy Currington; Joe Nichols; Brett Eldredge	—N/a	—N/a
July 27, 2014	Wantagh	United States	Nikon at Jones Beach Theater	Billy Currington; Joe Nichols; Brett Eldredge	—N/a	—N/a
July 30, 2014 (Note: The show on July 30, 2014, was a part of the Mississippi Valley Fair.)	Davenport	United States	Mississippi Valley Fair	Billy Currington; Joe Nichols; Brett Eldredge	—N/a	—N/a
August 2, 2014 (Note: The Show on August 2, 2014, was a part of the Watershed Festival.)	George	United States	Watershed Festival		—N/a	—N/a
August 3, 2014	Atlantic City	United States	Atlantic City Beach	Alex & Sierra; Cole Swindell; Canaan Smith	65,000 / 65,000	—N/a
August 7, 2014	Aurora	United States	Riveredge Park	Joe Nichols	—N/a	—N/a
August 8, 2014	Hinckley	United States	Grand Casino Hinckley Amphitheater	Joe Nichols	—N/a	—N/a
August 9, 2014 (Note: The show on July 9, 2014, was a part of the Wisconsin State Fair.)	West Allis	United States	Wisconsin State Fair	Joe Nichols	—N/a	—N/a
August 13, 2014	Hamburg	United States	Erie County Fair	Joe Nichols	—N/a	—N/a
August 14, 2014	Louisville	United States	Freedom Hall	Joe Nichols	—N/a	—N/a
August 16, 2014 (Note: The show on August 16, 2014, was a part of the Iowa State Fair.)	Des Moines	United States	Iowa State Fair	Joe Nichols	—N/a	—N/a
August 22, 2014	Clarkston	United States	DTE Energy Music Theatre	Billy Currington; Joe Nichols; Justin Moore	12,239 / 14,834	$409,968
August 23, 2014	Burgettstown	United States	First Niagara Pavilion	Billy Currington; Joe Nichols; Justin Moore	—N/a	—N/a
August 28, 2014 (Note: The show on August 28, 2014, was a part of the Great Allentown Fair.)	Allentown	United States	Allentown Fair	Joe Nichols	—N/a	—N/a
August 29, 2014	Hopewell	United States	CMAC	Billy Currington; Joe Nichols; Justin Moore	—N/a	—N/a
August 30, 2014	Bangor	United States	Darling's Waterfront Pavilion	Billy Currington; Joe Nichols; Justin Moore	—N/a	—N/a
August 31, 2014	Gilford	United States	Bank of New Hampshire Pavilion	Billy Currington; Joe Nichols; Justin Moore	7,655 / 7,655	$456,006
September 6, 2014 (Note: The show on September 6, 2014, was a part of the York Fair.)	York	United States	York Fair	Joe Nichols	—N/a	—N/a
September 7, 2014 (Note: The show on September 7, 2014, was a part of the Allegan County Fair.)	~~Allegan~~ Canceled	United States	~~Allegan County Fair~~ Canceled	Joe Nichols	—N/a	—N/a
September 28, 2014	Punta Cana	Dominican Republic	Hard Rock Hotel	Josh Turner; Jake Owen	—N/a	—N/a
Total					218,902 / 221,497 (98%)	$10,820,168

Cancelled tour dates

- Springfield, Missouri
- Southaven, Mississippi
- Allegan, Michigan (due to the birth of Dave Haywood's baby)

Rescheduled tour dates

Moved from March 27 at Chesapeake Energy Arena to June 27 at Downtown OKC Airpark.

== Wheels Up Tour ==
The Wheels Up Tour was the fourth headlining concert tour by Lady Antebellum, supporting their sixth studio album 747. It began on February 28, 2015, in Oslo, Norway and ended on October 3, 2015, in Las Vegas, Nevada.

== You Look Good World Tour ==
The You Look Good World Tour was the fifth headlining concert tour by Lady Antebellum, supporting their seventh studio album Heart Break. It began on May 26, 2017, in Bakersfield, California and ended on October 15, 2017, in Johannesburg, South Africa. This was the first tour that they visited Africa.

== Summer Plays On Tour ==
Summer Plays On Tour
- Tour by Lady Antebellum and Darius Rucker
- Location: North America
- Associated album: Heart Break; When Was the Last Time
- Start date: July 19, 2018
- End date: October 6, 2018
- Legs: 1
- No. of shows: 30
Lady Antebellum tour chronology
You Look Good World Tour (2017)	Summer Plays On Tour (2018)	Our Kind of Vegas (2019)
Darius Rucker tour chronology
Good for a Good Time Tour (2016)	Summer Plays On Tour (2018)

The Summer Plays On Tour is a current co-headlining concert tour by Lady Antebellum and American singer Darius Rucker. It supports their seventh studio album Heart Break, and Rucker's seventh studio album When Was the Last Time. It began on July 19, 2018, in Toronto, Canada and ended on October 6, 2018, in Bristow, Virginia.

=== Background and show ===
The tour was first announced in January 2018. Charles Kelley of Lady Antebellum and Rucker both expressed their excitement of touring with each other. Kelley saying, "Darius is one of our closet friends, and so we just feel really excited to get to share this tour and those memories on and off stage with him."

Both acts perform full sets along with a few collaborations.

=== Opening act ===
- Russell Dickerson

=== Setlists ===
Lady Antebellum

1. "You Look Good"
2. "Bartender"
3. "I Run to You"
4. "New Rules"/"Heart Break"
5. "Dancin' Away with My Heart"
6. "Compass"/"Meet in the Middle" (Diamond Rio cover)
7. "Our Kind of Love"
8. "American Honey"
9. "Raining on Sunday" (Keith Urban cover)
10. "Just a Kiss"
11. "Downtown"
12. "Lookin' for a Good Time"
13. "Need You Now"
14. "We Owned the Night"
15. "Hold My Hand" (Hootie & the Blowfish cover, performed with Rucker)
16. "Strawberry Wine" Deanna Carter cover, performed with Rucker and Russell Dickerson)
17. "Love Don't Live Here" performed with Rucker and Russell Dickerson)

Darius Rucker

1. "Homegrown Honey"
2. "Radio"
3. "Don't Think I Don't Think About It"
4. "This"
5. "If I Told You"
6. "Alright"
7. "For the First Time"
8. "Let Her Cry" (Hootie & the Blowfish song)
9. "It Won't Be Like This for Long"
10. "Come Back Song"
11. "Hands on Me"
12. "Straight to Hell" (Drivin N Cryin cover, performed with Charles Kelley)
13. "Only Wanna Be With You" (Hootie & the Blowfish song)
14. "Wagon Wheel" (Old Crow Medicine Show cover)

=== Tour dates ===
Date	City	Country	Venue	Attendance	Revenue
July 19, 2018	Toronto	Canada	Budweiser Stage	13,500/13,500	—N/a
July 20, 2018	Cuyahoga Falls	United States	Blossom Music Center	—N/a	—N/a
July 21, 2018 (Note: Only Lady Antebellum performed at the July 21, 2018, show in Darien, New York.)	Darien Center	United States	Darien Lake Performing Arts Center	—N/a	—N/a
July 26, 2018	Bethel	United States	Bethel Woods Center for the Arts	—N/a	—N/a
July 27, 2018	Gilford	United States	Bank of New Hampshire Pavilion	7,588 / 7,558	$550,555
July 28, 2018	Hartford	United States	Xfinity Theatre	—N/a	—N/a
August 2, 2018	Columbia	United States	Merriweather Post Pavilion	—N/a	—N/a
August 3, 2018	Holmdel	United States	PNC Bank Arts Center	—N/a	—N/a
August 4, 2018	Wantagh	United States	Jones Beach Theater	—N/a	—N/a
August 16, 2018	Mountain View	United States	Shoreline Amphitheatre	—N/a	—N/a
August 17, 2018	Wheatland	United States	Toyota Amphitheatre	—N/a	—N/a
August 19, 2018	Auburn	United States	White River Amphitheatre	—N/a	—N/a
August 23, 2018	Phoenix	United States	Ak-Chin Pavilion	—N/a	—N/a
August 24, 2018	Irvine	United States	FivePoint Amphitheatre	—N/a	—N/a
August 25, 2018	Chula Vista	United States	Mattress Firm Amphitheatre	—N/a	—N/a
September 1, 2018	Milwaukee	United States	American Family Insurance Amphitheater	—N/a	—N/a
September 6, 2018	Cincinnati	United States	Riverbend Music Center	—N/a	—N/a
September 7, 2018	Clarkston	United States	DTE Energy Music Theatre	—N/a	—N/a
September 8, 2018	Burgettstown	United States	KeyBank Pavilion	—N/a	—N/a
September 13, 2018	Maryland Heights	United States	Hollywood Casino Amphitheatre	—N/a	—N/a
September 14, 2018	Noblesville	United States	Ruoff Home Mortgage Music Center	—N/a	—N/a
September 15, 2018	Tinley Park	United States	Hollywood Casino Amphitheatre	—N/a	—N/a
September 20, 2018	Virginia Beach	United States	Veterans United Home Loans Amphitheater	—N/a	—N/a
September 21, 2018	Camden	United States	BB&T Pavilion	—N/a	—N/a
September 22, 2018	Mansfield	United States	Xfinty Center	—N/a	—N/a
September 27, 2018	Alpharetta	United States	Verizon Wireless Amphitheatre at Encore Park	—N/a	—N/a
September 28, 2018	Tampa	United States	MidFlorida Credit Union Amphitheatre	—N/a	—N/a
September 29, 2018	West Palm Beach	United States	Coral Sky Amphitheatre	—N/a	—N/a
October 4, 2018	Raleigh	United States	Coastal Credit Union Music Park	—N/a	—N/a
October 5, 2018	Charlotte	United States	PNC Music Pavilion	—N/a	—N/a
October 6, 2018	Bristow	United States	Jiffy Lube Live	—N/a	—N/a

== What A Song Can Do Tour ==
What a Song Can Do Tour
- Tour by Lady A
- Location: United States
- Associated album: What a Song Can Do
- Start date: July 29, 2021
- End date: October 10, 2021
- Legs: 1
- No. of shows: 34
Lady Antebellum tour chronology
Our Kind of Vegas (2019)	What A Song Can Do Tour (2021)	Request a Line Tour (2023)

The What a Song Can Do Tour was Lady A's sixth headlining concert tour. It began on July 29, 2021, in Uncasville, Connecticut and finished on October 10, 2021, in Gilford, New Hampshire. This was their first headlining tour since 2017, and first arena and amphitheater tour since 2018. The tour was in support of the ninth studio album What a Song Can Do.

=== Opening acts ===
- Carly Pearce
- Niko Moon
- Tenille Arts

=== Tour dates ===
Date	City	Country	Venue
July 29, 2021	Uncasville	United States	Mohegan Sun Arena
July 30, 2021	Wantagh	United States	Jones Beach Theater
August 6, 2021	Bonner Springs	United States	Azura Amphitheater
August 7, 2021	Rogers	United States	Walmart Arkansas Music Pavilion
August 8, 2021	Maryland Heights	United States	Hollywood Casino Amphitheatre
August 13, 2021	Clarkston	United States	DTE Energy Music Theatre
August 14, 2021	Syracuse	United States	St. Joseph's Health Amphitheater
August 15, 2021	Boston	United States	Leader Bank Pavilion
August 19, 2021	Orange Beach	United States	The Wharf Amphitheater
August 20, 2021	Jacksonville	United States	Daily's Place
August 21, 2021	West Palm Beach	United States	iTHINK Financial Amphitheatre
August 28, 2021	Tuscaloosa	United States	Tuscaloosa Amphitheater
August 29, 2021	Evansville	United States	Ford Center
September 2, 2021	Newport	United States	Ovation Concert Venue
September 3, 2021	Highland Park	United States	Ravinia Festival
September 4, 2021	Columbus	United States	Express Live!
September 5, 2021	Pittsburgh	United States	Stage AE
September 9, 2021	Albuquerque	United States	Isleta Amphitheater
September 10, 2021	Norman	United States	Lloyd Noble Center
September 11, 2021	New Braunfels	United States	Whitewater Amphitheatre
September 16, 2021	Phoenix	United States	Ak-Chin Pavilion
September 17, 2021	Irvine	United States	FivePoint Amphitheatre
September 18, 2021	Mountain View	United States	Shoreline Amphitheatre
September 23, 2021	Greenwood Village	United States	Fiddler's Green Amphitheatre
September 24, 2021	West Valley City	United States	USANA Amphitheatre
September 25, 2021	Las Vegas	United States	The Theater at Virgins Hotels
September 30, 2021	Wilmington	United States	Live Oak Bank Pavilion
October 1, 2021	Simpsonville	United States	CCNB at Heritage Park Amphitheatre
October 2, 2021	Alpharetta	United States	Ameris Bank Amphitheatre
October 8, 2021	Erie	United States	Erie Insurance Arena
October 9, 2021	Albany	United States	Times Union Center
October 10, 2021	Gilford	United States	Bank of New Hampshire Pavilion

== Request a Line Tour ==
Request a Line Tour
- Tour by Lady A
- Location: United States
- Associated album: What a Song Can Do
- Start date: April 14, 2023
- End date: October 28, 2023
- Legs: 1
- No. of shows: 23
Lady Antebellum tour chronology
What a Song Can Do Tour (2021)	Request Line Tour (2023)

The Request a Line Tour is Lady A's seventh headlining concert tour. It began on April 14, 2023, in Nashville, Tennessee, and finish on October 28, 2023, in Washington, D.C. It is in support of their ninth studio album What a Song Can Do (2021).

=== Opening act ===
- Dave Barnes

=== Tour dates ===
Date	City	Country	Venue
April 14, 2023	Nashville	United States	Ryman Auditorium
April 15, 2023	Nashville	United States	Ryman Auditorium
April 16, 2023	Nashville	United States	Ryman Auditorium
April 20, 2023	Chicago	United States	
April 21, 2023	Louisville	United States	
April 22, 2023	Indianapolis	United States	
May 6, 2023	Laughlin	United States	Laughlin Events Center
May 12, 2023	Indio	United States	Fantasy Springs Resort Casino
May 13, 2023	Pamona	United States	L.A. County Fair
June 1, 2023	Tulsa	United States	Paradise Cove at River Spirit
June 2, 2023	Dallas	United States	Majestic Theatre
June 3, 2023	Memphis	United States	Radians Amphitheater
June 22, 2023	Greenville	United States	Peace Concert Hall
June 23, 2023	Greensboro	United States	Stephen Tanger Center for the Performing Arts
June 24, 2023	Charleston	United States	Rivers Performance Hall
June 29, 2023	St. Petersburg	United States	Mahaffey Theater
July 1, 2023	Fort Lauderdale	United States	Au-Rene Theater
July 13, 2023	Emmett Charter Township	United States	FireKeepers Casino Hotel
July 24, 2023	Buffalo	United States	Shea's Performing Arts Center
October 20, 2023	Boston	United States	MGM Music Hall at Fenway
October 21, 2023	Philadelphia	United States	The Met
October 26, 2023	New York City	United States	Beacon Theatre
October 28, 2023	Washington, D.C.	United States	The Anthem

== This Winter's Night Tour (2025) ==
The This Winter's Night Tour was Lady A's eighth headlining concert tour. The twelve-date holiday tour began on December 5, 2025, in Atlanta, Georgia and finished on December 23, 2025, in Nashville, Tennessee.

== Concert residencies ==
Year	Title	Dates	Number of performances	Release format(s)
2019	Our Kind of Vegas	February 8 – August 31, 2019	15	
