= You Look Good World Tour =

2017 concert tour by Lady A

- Tour by Lady A
- Tour poster
- Associated album: Heart Break
- Start date: May 26, 2017
- End date: October 15, 2017
- Legs: 3
- No. of shows: 46

Lady A concert chronology
- Wheels Up Tour (2015); You Look Good Tour (2017); Summer Plays On Tour (2018)

The You Look Good World Tour was the fifth headlining concert tour by American country music trio, Lady A. The tour was in support of their seventh studio album, Heart Break (2017). It began on May 26, 2017, in Bakersfield, California and finished on October 15, 2017, in Johannesburg, South Africa. The North American leg was a part of the 2017 Live Nation Country Megaticket.

== Background ==
After taking a year off from releasing new music and touring; in January 2017, Lady Antebellum announced that would be going on tour in 2017, as well as releasing new music. They plan to play sixty-five shows in six countries including going back to Europe and trekking to South Africa for the first time. South African tour dates were announced on March 1, 2017 and European dates were announced on March 7.

The official hotel sponsor of the tour is Hilton in which they will give their Hilton Honor members "access to original content and once in a lifetime experiences."

== Show ==
Lady Antebellum opens up the show with their hit "Downtown" followed by "Our Kind of Love". Next is a new track off Heart Break, "This City". During this performance up on the screen there is a sign that says "Welcome to" followed by the city they're performing in that night. Halfway through Hillary Scott performs her own hit "Thy Will" accompanied by Dave Haywood on keys. Horns and additional percussion are brought in for "You Look Good". They also perform past hits, new material off Heart Break, and covers such as "You're Still the One", "Something Like That" and "Crazy in Love". The encore is made up of "Bartender" and "Need You Now".

== Opening acts ==
- Kelsea Ballerini
- Lindsay Ell
- Jason Benoit
- Refentse Morake
- Gabrielle Shonk
- Brett Young

== Setlist ==
1. "Downtown"
2. "Our Kind of Love"
3. "This City"
4. "Dancin' Away with My Heart"
5. "Heart Break"
6. "Compass"/"We Owned the Night"
7. "American Honey"
8. "I Run to You"
9. "Good Time to Be Alive" (mixed with Bill Withers’ "Lean On Me")
10. "Thy Will" (Hillary Scott and the Scott Family song)
11. "Hello World" (Chorus only)
12. "You're Still the One" (Shania Twain cover)
13. "Just a Kiss"
14. "You Look Good"
15. "Lookin' for a Good Time"
16. "Something Like That" (Tim McGraw cover)
17. "Crazy in Love" (Beyoncé cover)
18. "Love Don't Live Here"

Encore

19. "Bartender"
20. "Need You Now"
Notes
- On June 24, 2017, George Washington University's "Green Machine" pep band made a special appearance at the Bristow, Virginia show, during "You Look Good".
- On October 5, 7, 9 and 10, 2017, the trio performed Learning to Fly in honour of Tom Petty
- On October 4, 2017, in Manchester, they performed Somebody Else's Heart in place of Thy Will
- On October 7, 2017, in Glasgow, they performed Hurt in place of Thy Will

== Tour dates ==
Date	City	Country	Venue	Opening act(s)
North America
May 26, 2017	Bakersfield	United States	Rabobank Arena	Kelsea Ballerini; Brett Young; Lindsay Ell
May 27, 2017	Mountain View	United States	Shoreline Amphitheatre	Kelsea Ballerini; Brett Young; Lindsay Ell
May 28, 2017	Wheatland	United States	Toyota Amphitheatre	Kelsea Ballerini; Brett Young; Lindsay Ell
June 1, 2017	Albuquerque	United States	Isleta Amphitheater	Kelsea Ballerini; Brett Young; Lindsay Ell
June 2, 2017	Phoenix	United States	Ak-Chin Pavilion	Kelsea Ballerini; Brett Young; Lindsay Ell
June 3, 2017	Los Angeles	United States	Hollywood Bowl	Kelsea Ballerini; Brett Young; Lindsay Ell
June 4, 2017	Chula Vista	United States	Sleep Train Amphitheatre	Kelsea Ballerini; Brett Young; Lindsay Ell
June 15, 2017	Raleigh	United States	Coastal Credit Union Music Park	Kelsea Ballerini; Brett Young; Lindsay Ell
June 16, 2017	Charlotte	United States	PNC Music Pavilion	Kelsea Ballerini; Brett Young; Lindsay Ell
June 17, 2017	Virginia Beach	United States	Veterans United Home Loans Amphitheater	Kelsea Ballerini; Brett Young; Lindsay Ell
June 23, 2017	Camden	United States	BB&T Pavilion	Kelsea Ballerini; Brett Young; Lindsay Ell
June 24, 2017	Bristow	United States	Jiffy Lube Live	Kelsea Ballerini; Brett Young; Lindsay Ell
June 25, 2017	Cincinnati	United States	Riverbend Music Center	Kelsea Ballerini; Brett Young; Lindsay Ell
June 29, 2017	Toronto	Canada	Budweiser Stage	Kelsea Ballerini; Brett Young; Lindsay Ell
June 30, 2017 (Note: This show was a part of WYCD's Hoedown.)	Clarktson	United States	DTE Energy Music Theatre	Kelsea Ballerini; Brett Young; Lindsay Ell
July 1, 2017	Noblesville	United States	Klipsch Music Center	Kelsea Ballerini; Brett Young; Lindsay Ell
July 10, 2017 (Note: This concert on July 10, 2017, is a part of Quebec City Summer Festival in Quebec City, Quebec.)	Quebec City	Canada	Plains of Abraham	Kelsea Ballerini; Gabrielle Shonk
July 12, 2017 (Note: This concert on July 12, 2017, is a part of Rock the Park in London, Ontario.)	London	Canada	Harris Park	Kelsea Ballerini; Brett Young; Jason Benoit
July 13, 2017	Syracuse	United States	Lakeview Amphitheater	Kelsea Ballerini; Brett Young; Lindsay Ell
July 14, 2017	Wantagh	United States	Nikon at Jones Beach Theater	Kelsea Ballerini; Brett Young; Lindsay Ell
July 15, 2017 (Note: This concert on July 15, 2017, is a part of Jamboree in the Hills.)	Belmont	United States	Jamboree in the Hills	—
July 21, 2017	Cuyahoga Falls	United States	Blossom Music Center	Kelsea Ballerini; Brett Young; Lindsay Ell
July 22, 2017	Hartford	United States	Xfinity Theatre	Kelsea Ballerini; Brett Young; Lindsay Ell
July 23, 2017	Gilford	United States	Bank of New Hampshire Pavilion	Kelsea Ballerini; Brett Young; Lindsay Ell
July 28, 2017	Tampa	United States	MidFlorida Credit Union Amphitheatre	Kelsea Ballerini; Brett Young; Lindsay Ell
July 29, 2017	West Palm Beach	United States	Perfect Vodka Amphitheatre	Kelsea Ballerini; Brett Young; Lindsay Ell
August 3, 2017 (Note: This concert on August 3, 2017, is a part of WE Fest.)	Detroit Lakes	United States	Soo Pass Ranch	—
August 5, 2017	Rogers	United States	Walmart Arkansas Music Pavilion	Kelsea Ballerini; Brett Young; Lindsay Ell
August 10, 2017	Darien Lake	United States	Daien Lake PAC	Kelsea Ballerini; Brett Young; Lindsay Ell
August 11, 2017	Holmdel	United States	PNC Bank Arts Center	Kelsea Ballerini; Brett Young; Lindsay Ell
August 12, 2017	Mansfield	United States	Xfinity Center	Kelsea Ballerini; Brett Young; Lindsay Ell
August 18, 2017	Maryland Heights	United States	Hollywood Casino Amphitheatre	Kelsea Ballerini; Brett Young; Lindsay Ell
August 26, 2017	Dallas	United States	Starplex Pavilion	Kelsea Ballerini; Brett Young; Lindsay Ell
August 30, 2017	West Valley City	United States	USANA Amphitheatre	Kelsea Ballerini; Brett Young; Lindsay Ell
September 1, 2017	Nampa	United States	Ford Amphitheatre	Kelsea Ballerini; Brett Young; Lindsay Ell
September 2, 2017 (Note: This concert on September 2, 2017, is a part of the Washington State Fair.)	Puyallup	United States	Washington State Fair	Kelsea Ballerini; Brett Young; Lindsay Ell
September 3, 2017	Ridgefield	United States	Sunlight Supply Amphitheater	Kelsea Ballerini; Brett Young; Lindsay Ell
September 7, 2017	Pelham	United States	Oak Mountain Amphitheatre	Kelsea Ballerini; Brett Young; Lindsay Ell
September 8, 2017	Alpharetta	United States	Verizon Wireless Amphitheatre at Encore Park	Kelsea Ballerini; Brett Young; Lindsay Ell
September 9, 2017	Nashville	United States	Bridgestone Arena	Kelsea Ballerini; Brett Young; Lindsay Ell
Europe
October 1, 2017	Amsterdam	Netherlands	AFAS Live	Kelsea Ballerini; Lindsay Ell
October 4, 2017	Manchester	England	Manchester Arena	Kelsea Ballerini; Brett Young; Lindsay Ell
October 5, 2017	Dublin	Ireland	3Arena	Kelsea Ballerini; Brett Young; Lindsay Ell
October 7, 2017	Glasgow	Scotland	The SSE Hydro	Kelsea Ballerini; Brett Young; Lindsay Ell
October 9, 2017	Birmingham	England	Barclaycard Arena	Kelsea Ballerini; Brett Young; Lindsay Ell
October 10, 2017	London	England	The O_{2}	Kelsea Ballerini; Brett Young; Lindsay Ell
Africa
October 13, 2017	Cape Town	South Africa	Grand Arena	Refentse Morake
October 15, 2017	Johannesburg	South Africa	Ticketpro Dome	Refentse Morake

List of festivals

=== Box office score data ===
City	Venue	Attendance	Revenue
Los Angeles	Hollywood Bowl	14,437 / 17,578	$1,061,738
London	The O_{2}	9,383 / 12,005	$599,935
Total			

== Critical reception ==
Jared Allen of Volume Magazine says that "Lady Antebellum blows Charlotte away with brass and brilliance;" "You Look Good" sounds better than live than on recording.
