= Wheels Up Tour =

2015 concert tour by Lady Antebellum

- Tour by Lady Antebellum
- Promotional poster for the tour
- Associated album: 747
- Start date: February 28, 2015
- End date: October 3, 2015
- Legs: 3
- No. of shows: 65
- Box office: $23.2 million

Lady Antebellum concert chronology
- Take Me Downtown Tour (2014); Wheels Up Tour (2015); You Look Good World Tour (2017)

The Wheels Up Tour was the fourth headlining tour by American country music trio, Lady Antebellum. The tour was in support of their sixth studio album, 747 (2014) that began on February 28, 2015, in Oslo, Norway, and concluded on October 3, 2015, in Las Vegas. It was the forty-fifth ranked show of 2015, according to Pollstar and grossed $23.2 million.

== Background ==
On January 6, 2015, while appearing on The Talk, the trio first announced the tour with cities being announced shortly after. Lady Antebellum will take the tour to Europe, Australia and North America. In North America the tour will be a part of Live Nation's Country Megaticket. The tour's name "Wheels Up" is played off from the title of the band's current album, 747, like a plane taking off.

Band member Charles Kelley says about the tour, "The magic of being with fans from all over the country is really why we're ultimately all here." "Being able to play off each other on that stage is honestly where we have the most fun, and I have a feeling the crowd will already be on their feet when we get out there after starting the night with Hunter and Sam!"

== Production ==
For the show's production it was designed to match the music of Lady Antebellum, according to production designer, Bruce Rodgers. He also went on to stay that their music inspired it. The stage is designed to give a 3D look by using an oval shaped portal, a video screen, a latticework of LED lights, and three lighting pods that can play at different elevations.

== Concert synopsis ==
The show begins with the instrumental of "Long Stretch of Love" with the video screen being the only thing lit up. The image on the screen is filled with colors such as blue and purple, in the middle is a speaker that moves along to the music. After nearly a minute of this the middle screen begins to rise and all three screens go dark. As it rises a bright light emerges and then when the light diminishes Scott, Haywood, and Kelley emerge through where the middle video screen was and start singing "Long Stretch of Love". The screen then descends back down. Lady Antebellum ends the night with "We Owned the Night".

== Opening acts ==
- Kelsea Ballerini (North America)
- The Band Perry (Europe)
- Lee Brice (Australia)
- Kristian Bush (Australia)
- Brandy Clark (Australia)
- Troy Cassar-Daley (Australia)
- Brantley Gilbert (Europe)
- Hunter Hayes (North America)
- Sam Hunt (North America)
- Kip Moore (Europe)
- Maddie & Tae (Europe & Australia)
- Thompson Square (Europe)

== Setlist ==
Europe & Australia

Some songs not performed at every show

1. "Bartender"
2. "Long Stretch of Love"
3. "Our Kind of Love"
4. "Just a Kiss"
5. "Love Don't Live Here"
6. "Just a Girl"
7. "American Honey"
8. "Lie with Me"
9. "Compass"
10. "Lookin' for a Good Time"
11. "One Great Mystery" (acoustic)
12. Medley: "Dancin' Away with My Heart"/"Wanted You More"/"Goodbye Town"/"Hello World"
13. "Islands in the Stream" (Kenny Rogers & Dolly Parton cover)
14. "Downtown"
15. "I Run to You"
16. "Freestyle"
17. "American Woman" (The Guess Who cover)
18. "We Owned the Night"

Encore

19. "Need You Now"
20. "Wake Me Up" (Avicii cover)
21. "Cups (When I'm Gone)" (cover)
North America Before June 24th
1. "Long Stretch of Love"
2. "Bartender"
3. "American Honey"
4. "Freestyle"
5. "Our Kind of Love"
6. "Just a Kiss" (Dave on Piano)
7. "Compass" (performed with Hunter Hayes on Guitar)
8. "Perfect Day"

Heading To B-Stage

9. "Love Don't Live Here"

B-Stage

10. "One Great Mystery"
11. "Thinking Out Loud" (Ed Sheeran cover)
12. "Let's Get It On" (Marvin Gaye cover)
13. "Dancing Away with My Heart"

Heading To Main Stage

14. "I Run to You"

Main stage

15. "Downtown"
16. "Any Man of Mine" (Shania Twain cover)
17. "Walk This Way" (Aerosmith cover, performed w/Sam Hunt & Hunter Hayes)
18. "Lookin' for a Good Time"

Encore

19. "747"
20. "Need You Now"
21. "We Owned the Night"
North America After June 24th
1. "Long Stretch of Love"
2. "Bartender"
3. "American Honey"
4. "Freestyle"
5. "Our Kind of Love"
6. "Just a Kiss" (Dave on Piano)
7. "Compass" (performed with Hunter Hayes on Guitar)
8. "Perfect Day"

Heading To B-Stage

9. "Love Don't Live Here"

B-Stage

10. "One Great Mystery"
11. "Thinking Out Loud" (Ed Sheeran cover)
12. "Let's Get It On" (Marvin Gaye cover)
13. "Dancing Away with My Heart"

Heading To Main Stage

14. "I Run to You"

Main Stage

15. "Downtown"
16. "Any Man of Mine" (Shania Twain cover)
17. "Walk This Way" (Aerosmith cover, performed w/Sam Hunt & Hunter Hayes)
18. "Lookin' for a Good Time"

Encore 1

19. "747"
20. "Need You Now"
21. "We Owned the Night"

Encore 2

22. "Landslide" (Fleetwood Mac cover)

== Tour dates ==
Date	City	Country	Venue	Opening act(s)	Attendance	Revenue
Europe
February 28, 2015^{[A]}	Oslo	Norway	Spektrum	Gloriana; Kelsea Ballerini	15,290 / 15,290	—N/a
March 1, 2015^{[A]}	Stockholm	Sweden	Ericsson Globe	The Band Perry; Kelsea Ballerini	20,000 / 20,000	—N/a
March 5, 2015^{[A]}	Glasgow	Scotland	Clyde Auditorium	Kip Moore; Brandy Clark	3,000 / 3,000	—N/a
March 7, 2015^{[A]}	Dublin	Ireland	3Arena	Jason Aldean; Brantley Gilbert; Kip Moore	14,500/14,500	—N/a
March 8, 2015^{[A]}	London	England	The O_{2} Arena	Jason Aldean; Brantley Gilbert; Kip Moore	27,707 / 30,022	$2,865,170
Australia
March 13, 2015 ^{[B]}	Ipswich	Australia	CMC Rocks Queensland Festival	Lee Brice; Troy Cassar-Daley	—N/a	—N/a
March 15, 2015	Sydney	Australia	Sydney Entertainment Centre	Kristian Bush; Maddie & Tae	6,513 / 7,397	$616,301
March 17, 2015	Melbourne	Australia	Rod Laver Arena	Kristian Bush; Maddie & Tae	6,805 / 7,389	$505,024
North America
May 1, 2015	Lubbock	United States	United Supermarkets Arena	Hunter Hayes; Sam Hunt	—N/a	—N/a
May 2, 2015	Dallas	United States	Gexa Energy Pavilion	Hunter Hayes; Sam Hunt	—N/a	—N/a
May 3, 2015	The Woodlands	United States	Cynthia Woods Mitchell Pavilion	Hunter Hayes; Sam Hunt	—N/a	—N/a
May 8, 2015	Bossier City	United States	CenturyLink Center	Hunter Hayes; Sam Hunt	—N/a	—N/a
May 9, 2015	Lafayette	United States	Cajundome	Sam Hunt; Kelsea Ballerini	—N/a	—N/a
May 15, 2015	Maryland Heights	United States	Hollywood Casino Amphitheatre	Hunter Hayes; Sam Hunt	—N/a	—N/a
May 16, 2015	Noblesville	United States	Klipsch Music Center	Hunter Hayes; Sam Hunt	—N/a	—N/a
May 17, 2015	Cincinnati	United States	Riverbend Music Center	Hunter Hayes; Sam Hunt	—N/a	—N/a
May 29, 2015	Wantagh	United States	Nikon at Jones Beach Theater	Hunter Hayes; Sam Hunt	—N/a	—N/a
May 30, 2015	Mansfield	United States	Xfinity Center	Hunter Hayes; Sam Hunt	—N/a	—N/a
May 31, 2015	Saratoga Springs	United States	Saratoga Performing Arts Center	Hunter Hayes; Sam Hunt	—N/a	—N/a
June 4, 2015	Bangor	United States	Darling's Waterfront Pavilion	Hunter Hayes; Kelsea Ballerini	—N/a	—N/a
June 5, 2015	Holmdel	United States	PNC Bank Arts Center	Hunter Hayes; Sam Hunt	—N/a	—N/a
June 6, 2015	Bristow	United States	Jiffy Lube Live	Hunter Hayes; Sam Hunt	—N/a	—N/a
June 7, 2015 ^{[C]}	Myrtle Beach	United States	Carolina Country Music Festival	—N/a	—N/a	—N/a
June 14, 2015	Rogers	United States	Walmart Arkansas Music Pavilion	Hunter Hayes; Kelsea Ballerini	—N/a	—N/a
June 18, 2015	Toronto	Canada	Molson Canadian Amphitheatre	Hunter Hayes; Sam Hunt	—N/a	—N/a
June 19, 2015	Clarkston	United States	DTE Energy Music Theatre	Hunter Hayes; Sam Hunt	14,536 / 14,898	$514,491
June 20, 2015	Cuyahoga Falls	United States	Blossom Music Center	Hunter Hayes; Sam Hunt	20,444 / 20,444	$727,401
June 25, 2015	Wheatland	United States	Toyota Amphitheatre	Hunter Hayes; Sam Hunt	—N/a	—N/a
June 26, 2015	Mountain View	United States	Shoreline Amphitheatre	Hunter Hayes; Sam Hunt	—N/a	—N/a
June 27, 2015	Irvine	United States	Irvine Meadows Amphitheatre	Hunter Hayes; Sam Hunt	—N/a	—N/a
July 10, 2015	Chula Vista	United States	Sleep Train Amphitheatre	Hunter Hayes; Sam Hunt	—N/a	—N/a
July 11, 2015	Phoenix	United States	Ak-Chin Pavilion	Hunter Hayes; Sam Hunt	—N/a	—N/a
July 12, 2015	Albuquerque	United States	Isleta Amphitheater	Hunter Hayes; Sam Hunt	—N/a	—N/a
July 16, 2015	Austin	United States	Austin360 Amphitheatre	Hunter Hayes; Sam Hunt	—N/a	—N/a
July 17, 2015	Biloxi	United States	Mississippi Coast Coliseum	Hunter Hayes; Sam Hunt	—N/a	—N/a
July 18, 2015	Atlanta	United States	Aaron's Amphitheatre	Hunter Hayes; Sam Hunt	—N/a	—N/a
July 24, 2015	Sioux Falls	United States	Denny Sanford Premier Center	Hunter Hayes; Sam Hunt	9,973 / 9,973	$550,614
July 25, 2015	Wichita	United States	Intrust Bank Arena	Hunter Hayes; Sam Hunt	6,372 / 11,780	$355,364
July 26, 2015	Englewood	United States	Fiddler's Green Amphitheatre	Hunter Hayes; Sam Hunt	—N/a	—N/a
July 29, 2015	West Valley City	United States	USANA Amphitheatre	Hunter Hayes; Sam Hunt	—N/a	—N/a
July 31, 2015^{[D]}	Merritt	Canada	Rockin' River Country Music Festival	—N/a	—N/a	—N/a
August 1, 2015	Lethbridge	Canada	Enmax Centre	The Never Ending; Kelsea Ballerini	—N/a	—N/a
August 2, 2015^{[E]}	Camrose	Canada	Big Valley Jamboree	—N/a	—N/a	—N/a
August 7, 2015	Charlotte	United States	PNC Music Pavilion	Hunter Hayes; Sam Hunt	—N/a	—N/a
August 8, 2015	Raleigh	United States	Walnut Creek Amphitheatre	Hunter Hayes; Sam Hunt	—N/a	—N/a
August 9, 2015	Virginia Beach	United States	Farm Bureau Live	Hunter Hayes; Sam Hunt	—N/a	—N/a
August 14, 2015	Hershey	United States	Giant Center	Hunter Hayes; Sam Hunt	—N/a	—N/a
August 15, 2015	Hartford	United States	Xfinity Theatre	Hunter Hayes; Sam Hunt	—N/a	—N/a
August 16, 2015	Gilford	United States	Bank of New Hampshire Pavilion	Hunter Hayes; Sam Hunt	8,090 / 8,090	$537,790
August 20, 2015	Omaha	United States	CenturyLink Center Omaha	Hunter Hayes; Sam Hunt	—N/a	—N/a
August 21, 2015	Bonner Springs	United States	Cricket Wireless Amphitheater	Hunter Hayes; Sam Hunt	—N/a	—N/a
August 22, 2015	Tinley Park	United States	First Midwest Bank Amphitheatre	Hunter Hayes; Sam Hunt	—N/a	—N/a
August 28, 2015	Endicott	United States	Dick's Sporting Goods Open	Sam Hunt; Kelsea Ballerini	—N/a	—N/a
August 29, 2015^{[F]}	Lima	United States	Allen County Fair	Sam Hunt; Kelsea Ballerini	—N/a	—N/a
September 3, 2015	Pelham	United States	Oak Mountain Amphitheater	Hunter Hayes; Sam Hunt	—N/a	—N/a
September 4, 2015^{[G]}	Panama City	United States	Pepsi Gulf Coast Jam	Hunter Hayes; Sam Hunt; Thomas Rhett	—N/a	—N/a
September 5, 2015	Tampa	United States	MidFlorida Credit Union Amphitheatre	Hunter Hayes; Sam Hunt	—N/a	—N/a
September 6, 2015	West Palm Beach	United States	Perfect Vodka Amphitheatre	Hunter Hayes; Sam Hunt	—N/a	—N/a
September 10, 2015	Lexington	United States	Rupp Arena	Hunter Hayes; Sam Hunt	—N/a	—N/a
September 11, 2015	Nashville	United States	Bridgestone Arena	Hunter Hayes; Sam Hunt	15,032 / 15,032	$666,076
September 12, 2015	Greenville	United States	Bon Secours Wellness Arena	Hunter Hayes; Kelsea Ballerini	—N/a	—N/a
September 15, 2015	Saint Leonard	United States	Bayside Toyota Pavilion	—N/a	—N/a	—N/a
September 17, 2015	Allegan	United States	Allegan County Fair	Sam Hunt	—N/a	—N/a
September 18, 2015	Burgettstown	United States	First Niagara Pavilion	Hunter Hayes; Sam Hunt	—N/a	—N/a
September 19, 2015	Camden	United States	Susquehanna Bank Center	Hunter Hayes; Sam Hunt	—N/a	—N/a
October 3, 2015	Las Vegas	United States	Route 91 Harvest Festival	Joe Nichols; Jon Pardi	—N/a	—N/a
Total					147,818 / 157,371 (94%)	6,610,830

Canceled shows

- June 13, 2015: Southaven — BankPlus Amphitheater
  (Canceled due to scheduling conflicts)

List of festivals & fairs
^{A} These concerts were a part of the Country 2 Country music festival.
^{B} This concert was a part of the CMC Rocks Queensland Festival.
^{C} This concert was a part of the Carolina Country Music Festival.
^{D} This concert is a part of the Rockin' River Country Music Festival.
^{E} This concert is a part of the Big Valley Jamboree.
^{F} This concert is a part of the Allen County Fair.
^{G} This concert is a part of the Pepsi Gulf Coast Jam.

== Live DVD ==
The Lady Antebellum: Wheels Up Tour was released to DVD on November 13, 2015. It was shot during their June 27 show in Irvine, California.

== Personnel ==
Band

- Dave Haywood: Guitar, mandolin, piano, vocals
- Charles Kelley: Vocals
- Hillary Scott: Vocals
- Clint Chandler: Mandolin
- Dennis Edwards: Bass guitar
- Jason "Slim" Gambill: Acoustic guitar, electric guitar
- Jonathon Long: Accordion, musical director, piano
- Chris Tyrrell: Drums

Crew

- Brett "Scoop" Blanden: FOH Engineer
- Arlo Guthrie: Lightning design
- Bruce Rodgers: Production design

Other

Red Light Management: Management
