= Live Oak Bank Pavilion =

Entertainment Venue in Wilmington, NC

- Interactive map of Live Oak Bank Pavilion
- Former names: North Waterfront Park (2021); Riverfront Park Amphitheater (2021)
- Address: 10 Cowan Street; Wilmington, North Carolina 28401
- Coordinates: 34°14′56″N 77°57′04″W
- Owner: City of Wilmington
- Operator: Live Nation
- Capacity: 7,200
- Type: Amphitheater

Construction
- Opened: July 16, 2021

Website
- Venue website

The Live Oak Bank Pavilion (originally North Waterfront Park) is an amphitheatre in Wilmington, North Carolina. It is the largest music venue in Wilmington, and located next the Cape Fear River. It opened in July 2021. The venue is operated by Live Nation and owned by the City of Wilmington. The amphitheatre has a capacity of 7,200: 2,400 seated, and lawn space of 4,800.

== History ==
Originally the venue was called North Waterfront Park then in April 2021, it was renamed Riverfront Park Amphitheater. Three months later in July the venue was renamed once again after a new naming rights deal with Wilmington based Live Oak Bank. The amphitheatre opened on July 16, 2021, with inaugural act Widespread Panic playing sold three shows in a row.

== Events ==
List of events held at the Amphitheatre
Artist	Event	Date	Opening act(s)
311	Live from the Ride Tour	September 4, 2021	Iration & Iya Terra
Avett Brothers	North Carolina Azalea Festival 2021	August 20, 2021	—N/a
Avett Brothers	North Carolina Azalea Festival 2021	August 21, 2021	—N/a
Bon Iver	USS–S Tour	April 12, 2022	Dijon
Brantley Gilbert	North Carolina Azalea Festival 2022	April 7, 2022	—N/a
Brett Eldredge	Good Day Tour	October 14, 2021	Morgan Evans
Chatham County Line	–	August 21, 2021	—N/a
Chicago	Chicago Live in Concert	October 12, 2021	—N/a
Counting Crows	Butter Miracle Tour	September 29, 2021	Frank Turner
Cypress Hill & Big Daddy Kane	North Carolina Azalea Festival 2022	April 9, 2022	—N/a
Girl Named Tom	North Carolina Azalea Festival 2022	April 6, 2022	—N/a
Glass Animals	Dreamland Tour	September 5, 2021	Binki
Gov't Mule	Summer Tour 2021	September 23, 2021	Trombone Shorty & Margo Price
GRiZ	GRizmas in July	July 30, 2021	Eazybaked & Kilamanzegp
Harry Connick Jr.	Time to Play Tour	August 25, 2021	—N/a
Lady A	What A Song Can Do Tour	September 30, 2021	Carly Pearce, Niko Moon, Tenille Arts
Miranda Lambert	Wildcard Tour	August 7, 2021	Matt Stell & Elvie Shane
REO Speedwagon	North Carolina Azalea Festival 2022	April 8, 2022	Mother's Finest
Santana	Blessings and Miracles Tour	September 15, 2021	—N/a
Sublime with Rome, Michael Franti & Spearhead	North Carolina Azalea Festival 2021	August 19, 2021	—N/a
Tedeschi Trucks Band	Live in 25	October 22, 2025	Little Feat
Train	2021 Tour	August 10, 2021	Vertical Horizon
Trevor Noah	Back to Abnormal Tour	September 25, 2021	—N/a
Trey Anastasio Band	2021 Tour	September 24, 2021	—N/a
Widespread Panic	Widespread Panic Tour 2021	July 16, 2021	—N/a
Widespread Panic	Widespread Panic Tour 2021	July 17, 2021	—N/a
Widespread Panic	Widespread Panic Tour 2021	July 18, 2021	—N/a

== See also ==
- List of contemporary amphitheaters
- Live Nation
