= Heart Break (Lady Antebellum album) =

Studio album by Lady Antebellum
- Released: June 9, 2017
- Recorded: 2016–17
- Genre: Country
- Length: 43:49
- Label: Capitol Nashville
- Producer: busbee

Lady Antebellum chronology
747 (2014)	Heart Break (2017)	Ocean (2019)

Singles from Heart Break
- 1. "You Look Good" Released: January 19, 2017; 2. "Heart Break" Released: September 25, 2017

Heart Break is the seventh studio album by American country pop trio Lady Antebellum. It was released on June 9, 2017, through Capitol Records Nashville. The album serves as the "spiritual follow-up" to 2010's Need You Now and is their first release since 2014's 747, with its three-year gap being the longest between two albums by the group to date.

Heart Break was supported by two singles: The first single "You Look Good" was released in January 2017 as the record's lead single and has since become the group's thirteenth top 10 single on the Hot Country Songs chart. The second single "Heart Break" was released in September 2017. The album debuted at number four on the US Billboard 200 chart, earning 53,000 album-equivalent units in its first week.

== Background ==
In 2015, Lady Antebellum began experiencing declining success with the singles released from their sixth studio album, 747 (2014), which the band attributes to a "fatigue" amongst fans and radio programmers. After the completion of their accompanying Wheels Up Tour, the group announced a short hiatus from both recording and touring. During this time, the members all worked on individual projects – Charles Kelley and Hillary Scott on their solo debuts The Driver and Love Remains, respectively, and Dave Haywood on the production of Post Monroe's debut EP. When the group returned to work on their next album, they spent a month in Los Angeles, California and recruited pop producer busbee to oversee the project. The album was written and recorded primarily in Florida and California, due to the group feeling creatively stifled in Nashville.

== Singles ==
"You Look Good" was released to digital retailers on January 19, 2017, as the album's first single. The song impacted American country radio on January 23. "You Look Good" scored a "hot shot debut" of number 27 on the Country Airplay chart dated February 4, 2017, and has since peaked within the top 20. The song entered the Hot Country Songs chart at number 41. Following the group's performance of the single at the 2017 ACM Awards on April 2, 2017, "You Look Good" rose twelve positions to number 9 (on the chart dated April 22, 2017). This earned Lady Antebellum their thirteenth top 10 hit on that chart, and first since "Bartender" in 2014. The song rose to number 8 on the Hot Country Songs chart (on the chart dated July 1, 2017). On the chart dated July 15, 2017, "You Look Good" rose into the top 10 of the Country Airplay chart. It has since peaked at number 4.

The title track, "Heart Break", was released as a digital promotional single on May 12, 2017. It was released to American country radio stations on September 25, 2017, as the second official single.

=== Promotional singles ===
The second promotional single, "Somebody Else's Heart", was released on May 19, 2017.

The third promotional single, "This City", was released on May 26, 2017.

The fourth promotional single, "Hurt", was released on June 2, 2017.

== Accolades ==
Year	Association	Category	Result
2017	Country Music Association Awards	Album of the Year	Nominated
2018	Grammy Awards	Best Country Album	Nominated
2018	Grammy Awards	Best Country Duo/Group Performance – "You Look Good"	Nominated

== Commercial performance ==
Heart Break debuted at number four on the US Billboard 200 chart, earning 53,000 album-equivalent units (including 47,000 copies as pure album sales) in its first week. This became Lady Antebellum's eighth US top-ten debut. The album also debuted at number one on the US Top Country Albums chart, becoming the group's fifth number one on the chart. As of December 2018, the album has sold 170,200 copies in the United States.

== Track listing ==
No.	Title	Writer(s)	Lead Vocals	Length
1.	"Heart Break"	Dave Haywood; Charles Kelley; Hillary Scott; Jesse Frasure; Nicolle Galyon	Hillary Scott	3:07
2.	"You Look Good"	busbee; Ryan Hurd; Hillary Lindsey	Charles Kelley; Scott	3:01
3.	"Somebody Else's Heart"	Haywood; Kelley; Scott; busbee; Shane McAnally	Kelley; Scott	3:32
4.	"This City"	Haywood; Kelley; Scott; Sara Haze; Will Weatherly	Scott	3:04
5.	"Hurt"	Jon Green; Melissa Peirce; Ben West	Scott	3:46
6.	"Army"	Haywood; Kelley; Scott; busbee; Galyon	Kelley	3:17
7.	"Good Time to Be Alive"	Haywood; Kelley; Scott; busbee; Weatherly; Emily Weisband	Kelley; Scott	3:11
8.	"Think About You"	Haywood; Scott; Haze; Weatherly	Scott	3:09
9.	"Big Love in a Small Town"	Haywood; Kelley; Scott; Galyon; Jordan Reynolds	Kelley; Scott	3:46
10.	"The Stars"	Haywood; Kelley; Scott; busbee	Scott; Kelley	3:23
11.	"Teenage Heart"	Haywood; Kelley; Scott; Green	Kelley	3:40
12.	"Home"	Haywood; Kelley; Scott; busbee	Kelley; Scott	2:58
13.	"Famous"	Haywood; Kelley; Scott; Eric Paslay	Scott	3:50
Total length:				43:49

== Personnel ==
Adapted from AllMusic.

Lady Antebellum

- Dave Haywood – banjo, bouzouki, acoustic guitar, electric guitar, mandolin, background vocals
- Charles Kelley – lead vocals, background vocals, acoustic guitar
- Hillary Scott – lead vocals, background vocals

Additional musicians

- Eric Barvinder – viola
- Charlie Bisharat – violin
- Jacob Braun – cello
- busbee – bass guitar, Hammond B-3 organ, mellotron, piano, synthesizer, background vocals
- Paul Bushnell – bass guitar
- David Campbell – string arrangements
- Matt Chamberlain – cymbals, drums, percussion
- Paul Franklin – pedal steel guitar
- Jesse Frasure – synthesizer
- Jon Green – keyboards, percussion, background vocals
- Sara Haze – background vocals
- Sean Hurley – bass guitar, background vocals
- Songa Lee – violin
- Russ Pahl – pedal steel guitar
- Garrett Parales – electric guitar
- Jordan Reynolds – piano
- Michelle Richards – violin
- Justin Schipper – Dobro
- Aaron Sterling – drums, percussion, tom-toms, background vocals
- Mark Trussell – acoustic guitar, electric guitar, synthesizer
- Nick Vayenas – trombone, trumpet
- Josefina Vergara – violin
- Will Weatherly – synthesizer, background vocals
- Emily Weisband – background vocals
- Derek Wells – banjo, dobro, electronic mandolin, electric guitar, mandolin, background vocals
- Ben West – synthesizer

Production and artwork

- Adam Ayan – mastering
- Sean R. Badum – assistant engineer
- busbee – engineer, producer, programming
- Matt Chamberlin – programming
- Dave Clauss – digital editing, programming
- Callie Cunningham – art direction
- Eric Ray Davis – photography
- John Edwards – assistant engineer
- Jesse Frasure – programming
- Douglas Gledhill – design, layout
- Dave Haywood – art direction
- Charles Kelley – art direction
- Ryan McCann – design, layout
- Daniel Miller – art direction
- Justin Niebank – mixing
- Charlie Paakkari – engineer
- Justin Schipper – engineer
- Hillary Scott – art direction
- Melissa Spillman – production assistant
- Mark Trussell – engineer
- Nick Vayenas – engineer
- Will Weatherly – programming
- Brian David Willis – digital editing

== Charts ==
=== Weekly charts ===
Chart (2017)	Peak position
Australian Albums (ARIA)	6
Belgian Albums (Ultratop Flanders)	120
Belgian Albums (Ultratop Wallonia)	140
Canadian Albums (Billboard)	6
Dutch Albums (Album Top 100)	64
German Albums (Offizielle Top 100)	83
Irish Albums (IRMA)	44
New Zealand Heatseekers Albums (RMNZ)	1
Scottish Albums (OCC)	9
Swiss Albums (Schweizer Hitparade)	18
UK Albums (OCC)	14
UK Country Albums (OCC)	2
US Billboard 200	4
US Top Country Albums (Billboard)	1

=== Year-end charts ===
Chart (2017)	Position
Australian Country Albums (ARIA)	11
US Billboard 200	200
US Top Country Albums (Billboard)	37
