= You Look Good =

Single by Lady Antebellum

from the album Heart Break
- Released: January 19, 2017
- Genre: Country pop
- Length: 3:03
- Label: Capitol Nashville
- Songwriters: Hillary Lindsey; Ryan Hurd; busbee
- Producer: busbee

Lady Antebellum singles chronology
"Something Better" (2015)	"You Look Good" (2017)	"Heart Break" (2017)

"You Look Good" is a song recorded by American country music group Lady Antebellum and serves as the first single from the group's seventh studio album, Heart Break (2017), and it features lead vocals from both Scott and Kelley. It was released on January 19, 2017 through Capitol Records Nashville and impacted American country radio on January 23. The song was written by Hillary Lindsey, Ryan Hurd, and its producer, busbee.

== Background and release ==
In 2015, Lady Antebellum began experiencing declining success with the singles released from their sixth studio album, 747 (2014), which the band attributes to a "fatigue" amongst fans and radio programmers. After the completion of their accompanying Wheels Up Tour, the group announced a short hiatus from recording or touring. During this time, the members all worked on individual projects – Charles Kelley and Hillary Scott on their solo debuts The Driver and Love Remains, respectively, and Dave Haywood on the production of Post Monroe's debut EP. When the group returned to work on their next album, they spent a month in Los Angeles, California and recruited pop producer busbee to oversee the project.

"You Look Good" was reportedly on hold for Thomas Rhett before being picked up and recorded by Lady Antebellum. The song was released January 19, 2017. "You Look Good" serves as the group's first new release since 2014 following their hiatus.

== Composition ==
"You Look Good" is primarily a country pop song with influences of funk, jazz, and soul. The song incorporates a "brassy" horn section, a career first for the group. Billy Dukes of Taste of Country noted that "You Look Good" is the group's third consecutive lead single to "[stretch] the perception of who they are."

== Critical reception ==
Billy Dukes of Taste of Country praised the energy of the song, writing, "any time Hillary Scott can match [Charles Kelley's] easy swagger they look — and sound — good. In fact, Lady Antebellum rarely loses when the two vocalists are committed to the same vocal emotion." David Watt of All Noise wrote that "You Look Good" is "a good song with a... fresh sound and it has proved the claims... made by the band about their... [desire] to innovate."

== Commercial performance ==
"You Look Good" debuted at number 27 on the Billboard Country Airplay chart dated February 4, 2017 as the week's "hot shot debut." It also debuted at number 41 on the magazine's Hot Country Songs chart dated February 4, 2017. The song sold 4,000 copies in its first day of availability. After Lady Antebellum's performance at the ACM Awards, the song sold 41,000 copies, up 320% from the week before. It has sold 408,000 copies in the US as of September 2017.

== Music video ==
The group released an official lyric video to accompany the song on January 19, 2017. Chronicling the months spent working on Heart Break, the video includes Polaroid photos and video footage of this time period and shows Charles, Hillary, and Dave "goofing off." The video ends with a clip of the group from 2006 before the release of their debut because, as Haywood told Billboard, they "wanted to get back that feeling we felt back in 2006 when we started" during the recording process of this album.

An official music video was released in June 2017. Directed by Shane Drake, it was filmed back-to-back with the video for their next single, "Heart Break" on location in San Juan, Puerto Rico. The same lead actress and actor from this video star in the next video. This one shows the group performing the song in a sweaty nightclub full of locals, ending with a "To Be Continued..." moniker.

== Chart performance ==
Chart (2017)	Peak position
Canada Hot 100 (Billboard)	99
Canada Country (Billboard)	8
US Billboard Hot 100	59
US Country Airplay (Billboard)	4
US Hot Country Songs (Billboard)	8

=== Year-end charts ===
Chart (2017)	Position
Canada Country (Billboard)	15
US Country Airplay (Billboard)	3
US Hot Country Songs (Billboard)	9

== Certifications ==
Region	Certification	Certified units/sales
Canada (Music Canada)	Gold	40,000^{‡}
^{‡} Sales+streaming figures based on certification alone.

== Release history ==
List of releases, showing region, release date, format, and record label.
Country	Date	Format	Label	Ref.
Worldwide	January 19, 2017	Digital download	Capitol Nashville; Decca	
United States	January 23, 2017	Country radio	Capitol Nashville	
