= Freestyle (Lady Antebellum song) =

Single by Lady Antebellum

from the album 747
- Released: October 20, 2014
- Recorded: 2014
- Genre: Country pop; Southern rock
- Length: 3:04
- Label: Capitol Nashville
- Songwriter(s): Dave Haywood; Charles Kelley; Hillary Scott; Shane McAnally
- Producer(s): Nathan Chapman; Lady Antebellum

Lady Antebellum singles chronology
"Bartender'" (2014)	"Freestyle" (2014)	"Long Stretch of Love" (2015)

"Freestyle" is a song written and recorded by American country music trio Lady Antebellum. It was written Dave Haywood, Charles Kelley, Hillary Scott and Shane McAnally, and co-produced by Nathan Chapman. The song served as the second single for the trio's sixth studio album, 747 and was released on October 20, 2014, and it features lead vocals from Kelley.

== Background and composition ==
During the group's 2014 tour, Charles Kelley told Rolling Stone, "Songs like 'Freestyle'" was a departure for them but "it's been proven to us over the past couple of years — is that when we do take chances, the fans have responded really well."

== Critical reception ==
Giving it a "C+", Bob Paxman of Country Weekly praised the song's "catchy" production, but felt that Lady Antebellum was "nearly unrecognizable" due to the rapid-fire lyric delivery. He also criticized the lyrics for having "buzzwords and imagery" that were "scattered".

== Music video ==
The music video for "Freestyle" was released in October 2014 and comedian and dancer Nathan Barnatt appears in the video. Part of the video was filmed at the Gramercy Theatre in Manhattan.

=== Synopsis ===
Barnatt plays his stage name "Keith Apicary", who is determined to meet Lady Antebellum in person. After falling short of meeting them, he comes up with a way to get past security by putting on a cowboy hat and a Lady Antebellum T-shirt. He eventually meets his goal when Charles (Kelley) invites him backstage where he meets the band.

== Chart performance ==
Chart (2014–2015)	Peak position
Canada Country (Billboard)	17
US Bubbling Under Hot 100 (Billboard)	1
US Country Airplay (Billboard)	16
US Hot Country Songs (Billboard)	24

=== Year-end charts ===
Chart (2015)	Position
US Country Airplay (Billboard)	75
US Hot Country Songs (Billboard)	93

== Release history ==
Country	Date	Format	Ref.
Worldwide	September 28, 2014	Streamed audio	
United States	September 28, 2014	Digital download	
United States	October 20, 2014	Country radio	
