= Heart Break (Lady Antebellum song) =

Single by Lady Antebellum

from the album Heart Break
- Released: September 25, 2017
- Genre: Country pop
- Length: 3:08
- Label: Capitol Nashville
- Songwriter(s): Dave Haywood; Charles Kelley; Hillary Scott; Jesse Frasure; Nicolle Galyon
- Producer(s): busbee

Lady Antebellum singles chronology
"You Look Good" (2017)	"Heart Break" (2017)	"What If I Never Get Over You" (2019)

"Heart Break" is a song recorded by American country music group Lady Antebellum and serves as the title track from the group's seventh studio album, of the same name (2017). The group co-wrote the song with Jesse Frasure and Nicolle Galyon. It was released to American country radio on September 25, 2017 as the album's second and final single, and it features lead vocals from Scott.

== Content ==
The title of the song is a play on the concept of heartbreak, with a message of "letting your heart take a break" in between relationships and taking time to recover one's self. "Heart Break" is about being "happily single" and subverts expectations with its title.

== Release and promotion ==
"Heart Break" was released to digital retailers on May 12, 2017 as the first promotional single from the album. The group performed the song on The Tonight Show Starring Jimmy Fallon on June 14, 2017 and on Good Morning America, amongst other songs, on July 14, 2017. The song was announced as the second radio single on September 11, 2017. It officially impacts country radio on September 25, 2017. "Heart Break" was included on the setlist for the trio's You Look Good World Tour.

== Critical reception ==
Matt Bjorke of Roughstock called "Heart Break" "perhaps the best potential follow-up to "You Look Good" as a radio moment," and praised the song's message of independence. Annie Reuter of Sounds Like Nashville wrote that the track is "one of the more memorable songs" on the album for its distinct storytelling. Cillea Houghton of Taste of Country wrote that the song "celebrates singledom with a chill vibe and a perky, pop-driven sound," and that it sets the tone for the rest of the album, which she reviewed favorably.

== Music video ==
The video for the song was directed by Shane Drake, and filmed over three days in San Juan, Puerto Rico, back-to-back with the video for "You Look Good". The video features the same actor and actress playing the lead roles from the previous video, and is considered a sequel to the previous video. However, unlike the video for "You Look Good," this video features more of a storyline and less of a performance.

It starts with the female searching through her purse for cash. She tells her husband she is going to the store, and he asks if she needs cash, to which she replies "I'm fine, thanks." She is then seen driving away, and looks over her shoulder as two police cars with their sirens blaring pass her on the opposite side of the road. She shrugs her shoulders as if nothing is wrong.

The song then begins, and Hillary is shown singing the first few lines while halfway in a bedroom doorway, Charles is playing guitar in a gated garage, and Dave is also playing guitar in an alleyway. As the song reaches its first chorus, the woman is seen walking around the center of San Juan in sunglasses and a flowing crop top and her purse over her shoulder. She goes to buy flowers, but bumps into her husband and happily walks away.

She then returns home, puts the vase on the kitchen table, and goes on her balcony, only to see her husband walk past. She is then seen in her bedroom getting ready to go out for the evening, and is then seen walking down an alleyway to a nightclub where Lady Antebellum are performing (the same nightclub from "You Look Good") and runs into her husband at the bar. Lady A are then seen singing the final chorus at an empty bar.

She then leaves the nightclub, unaware that her husband is following her. She returns home and sits down on her balcony with a glass of wine in hand as Lady A finish the song at the empty bar and make a toast.

The husband, meanwhile, is then seen in an alleyway with an envelope of photos of his wife. He gives the photos to another man, who looks at them and replies "She looks happy," implying that he really is her husband, and the man who was following her around was sent by him to spy on her. The final shot is of her sleeping in her bed in the light of day, which is used as a possible cliffhanger.

== Chart performance ==
"Heart Break" sold 7,000 copies in the first week following its promotional digital release. It resultantly debuted at number 49 on the Hot Country Songs chart dated June 3, 2017. Following its release as an official single, "Heart Break" entered the Country Airplay chart at number 57 on the chart dated October 14, 2017. On the chart dated December 2, 2017, the song re-entered the Hot Country Songs chart at number 47. After performing "Heart Break" on the ACM Awards, it sold 12,000 copies, a boost of 1,102% over the previous week.

== Charts ==
=== Weekly charts ===
Chart (2017–2018)	Peak position
Canada Country (Billboard)	33
US Bubbling Under Hot 100 Singles (Billboard)	5
US Country Airplay (Billboard)	15
US Hot Country Songs (Billboard)	22

=== Year-end charts ===
Chart (2018)	Position
US Country Airplay (Billboard)	47
US Hot Country Songs (Billboard)	55
