= Long Stretch of Love =

Single by Lady Antebellum

from the album 747
- Released: February 6, 2015
- Recorded: 2014
- Genre: Country; country rock
- Length: 2:51
- Label: Capitol Nashville
- Songwriter(s): Hillary Scott; Charles Kelley; Dave Haywood; Josh Kear
- Producer(s): Nathan Chapman; Lady Antebellum

Lady Antebellum singles chronology
"Freestyle" (2014)	"Long Stretch of Love" (2015)	"Something Better" (2015)

Long Stretch of Love is a song recorded by American country music group Lady Antebellum and serves as the third and final single from the group's sixth studio album, 747 (2014). It was released to radio in the UK on February 6, 2015 and then to American country radio on March 23, 2015, and it features lead vocals from both Hillary Scott and Charles Kelley, who wrote the song with Dave Haywood and Josh Kear.

== Content ==
The song is an upbeat country rock song with "brash kick drum, thumping bass, and crunchy electric guitar riffs". Lyrically, it is about "commitment to love and sticking with it through the ups and downs". All three members of Lady Antebellum co-wrote the song with Josh Kear, and co-produced it with Nathan Chapman. Kear told Nash Country Weekly magazine that he had a track started for a writing session with the band, and when he presented it to them, co-lead singer Charles Kelley "hit on the verse melody pretty quickly, and the verses were all four of us throwing in ideas until the lyric matched the intensity of the track."

The main riff is played on a Woodrow, an Appalachian instrument manufactured only in Asheville, North Carolina, which is described as having a sound "halfway between a dulcimer and a banjo." Kear chose to use the instrument in the song after buying one in Asheville. Dan Williams, who invented the Woodrow, played the instrument with Lady Antebellum when they performed the song at the Country Music Association telecast on April 19, 2015.

== Critical reception ==
Giving the song a "B", Tammy Ragusa of Nash Country Weekly (then Country Weekly) wrote that the song was "driving, edgy, and electric…occasionally to the detriment of the band's thick and beautiful harmonies" but added that "the combination does add to the aggressive nature of the lyrics". An uncredited review from Taste of Country was also favorable, saying that "A forgotten tension between Charles Kelley and Hillary Scott reappears during this uptempo love song. It's the same chemistry that always left fans wondering 'Are they?' before it became obvious they weren’t." and "Scott mostly plays lead on the chorus, but unlike many of Lady A's most recent singles, the song feels like a true three-part collaboration."

== Commercial performance ==
"Long Stretch of Love" debuted at number fifty-seven on the Billboard Country Airplay chart for the week ending April 4, 2015. It has since reached a peak of sixteen. The song debuted at number forty on the Hot Country Songs chart for the week ending July 11, 2015.

== Music video ==
A music video was directed by Justin Key and premiered in April 2015. This video was shot during their sold-out show at The O_{2} Arena in London. At the beginning of the video you can hear Charles, Hillary, and Dave talking about performing live, selling out a show at The O_{2} and playing in one of their favorite cities, London. The video also shows backstage footage of the band. A second music video was directed by TK McKamy and premiered in July 2015.

== Chart performance ==
Chart (2015)	Peak position
Canada Country (Billboard)	34
US Bubbling Under Hot 100 (Billboard)	6
US Country Airplay (Billboard)	16
US Hot Country Songs (Billboard)	23

=== Year-end charts ===
Chart (2015)	Position
US Country Airplay (Billboard)	72
US Hot Country Songs (Billboard)	79

== Release history ==
Country	Date	Format	Label	Ref.
United Kingdom	February 6, 2015	Radio airplay	Parlophone	
United States	March 23, 2015	Country radio	Capitol Nashville	
