= 747 (album) =

Studio album by Lady Antebellum
- Released: September 30, 2014
- Recorded: 2013–2014
- Genres: Country; country rock
- Length: 37:57
- Label: Capitol Nashville
- Producers: Nathan Chapman; Lady Antebellum; Eric Kinney; Dave Thomson; busbee

Lady Antebellum chronology
Golden (2013)	747 (2014)	Heart Break (2017)

Singles from 747
- 1. "Bartender" Released: May 19, 2014; 2. "Freestyle" Released: October 20, 2014; 3. "Long Stretch of Love" Released: February 7, 2015

747 is the sixth studio album by American country music group Lady Antebellum, released on September 30, 2014, by Capitol Nashville. The production on the album was handled by Nathan Chapman, Eric Kinney, Dave Thomson, busbee and Lady Antebellum. The following three songs were released as singles from the album: "Bartender" (which was released in May 2014 and reached number one on the US Country Airplay chart in early September 2014), "Freestyle" and "Long Stretch of Love".

747 received generally positive reviews from music critics, who praised it for exploring a more diverse sound and affirming their pop crossover appeal. The album was also a moderate commercial success, selling 74,000 copies in its first week and debuting at number two on both the US Billboard 200 and the US Top Country Albums charts, thus becoming the band's first album not to top either chart. It also entered the top ten on the all-genre album charts in Australia and Canada.

== Content ==
Group member Hillary Scott told Billboard that they chose to name the album after the track "747" because "The track itself has this pushing, driving spirit about it that sums up our attitude right now. We are pushing ourselves as a band and as songwriters...taking ourselves out of our comfort zone and not taking ourselves too seriously. There's an urgency and an energy to it that we've never released before." The group produced the album with Nathan Chapman making it their first album not to be co-produced with longtime collaborator Paul Worley.

A deluxe version of the album was also released, containing three bonus tracks. One of these tracks, "Falling for You," was originally released on the soundtrack to the 2014 romantic drama The Best of Me. "Slow Rollin'" was originally recorded by Canadian country artist Dallas Smith.

== Promotion ==
=== Tour ===
The group announced their international fourth headlining tour, the Wheels Up Tour, in January 2015. Sponsored in part by Quicken Loans, the tour is scheduled to begin in Oslo, Norway on February 28, 2015 and end in Camden, New Jersey in the United States on September 19, 2015. Hunter Hayes and Sam Hunt are the opening acts for the North American shows, with Brandy Clark, Kip Moore, Lee Brice, Troy Cassar-Daley, Kristian Bush, and Maddie & Tae opening for various international stops.

=== Singles ===
"Bartender" was released as the album's lead single on May 19, 2014. The song reached number four on the Billboard Hot Country Songs and also topped the Country Airplay and Canada Country charts in the fall of 2014. In October 2014, a "pop mix" of the song was serviced to hot adult contemporary radio. It peaked at number 25 on the Adult Pop Songs chart, their first song to crossover to the adult contemporary format since "Just a Kiss" in 2011.

The album's second single, "Freestyle", was initially made available to digital retailers on September 28, 2014 as the first promotional single from the album and was subsequently sent to country radio on October 20, 2014 as the second official single. "Freestyle" peaked at number 24 on Hot Country Songs (their lowest peak on the chart in either of its formats) and at number 16 on Country Airplay (their second-lowest peak, behind 2012's "Wanted You More" at No. 20). It became the group's first single to not enter the Billboard Hot 100, though it did peak at number 1 on the Bubbling Under Hot 100 Singles extension chart; it also failed to enter the Canadian Hot 100, their first to do so since "Lookin' for a Good Time" in 2008.

"Long Stretch of Love" is the album's third official single, and second to be released to the UK. It was released in the UK on February 7, 2015 and then to country radio in the US on March 23, 2015.

=== Other songs ===
"Lie with Me" was released as a radio-only promotional single in the UK in January or February 2015, serving as the album's lead single in that market.

== Critical reception ==
Professional ratings
Aggregate scores
Source	Rating
Metacritic	66/100
Review scores
Source	Rating
AllMusic	3.5/5 stars
Billboard	4/5 stars
Los Angeles Times	1.5/4 stars
The Michigan Daily	(B)
The Boston Globe	(Negative)

The album received generally positive reviews from contemporary music critics. At Metacritic, which assigns a normalized rating out of 100 to reviews from mainstream critics, the album received an average score of 66, based on 5 reviews, which indicates "generally favorable reviews". Stephen Thomas Erlewine of AllMusic rated the album three-and-a-half stars out of five, writing that the album's pop-leaning sound "showcases the trio at its best" and that 747 gives the impression that the band has embraced its crossover status. Jill Menze of Billboard also noted the band's confidence on the record and attributed it to the more upbeat feel of the material. "The group's move away from its comfort zone is a worthy venture," writes Menze. "Lady A has always demonstrated the potential to deliver a little something more [and on] 747, we finally get a glimpse of it." Billy Dukes of Taste of Country praised the band for mixing things up on 747 and deviating from the middle of the road vibe of prior releases: "Over their last few albums, Charles Kelley and company had fallen back to the middle... ’747′ provides depth, variety and most importantly, a vibe Lady Antebellum can call their own." Dukes also compared the sound on 747 favorably to the repertoire of Fleetwood Mac, noting "Golden" collaborator Stevie Nicks's influence.

Michael McCall of MSN Entertainment described the album as having "a cohesive, celebratory feel that brings out the best in [the group] members" and praised the band for pursuing a sound that sets them apart from other country acts. Gregory Hicks of The Michigan Daily wrote a positive review applauding the band for consistently delivering enjoyable country pop, but suggested that their sonic transformation on 747 was not as ambitious or pronounced as it has been made out to be. "As a typical Lady A-formulaic manufactured record," Hicks explains, "it’s an attractive, emotionally grasping LP... But don’t expect the album to cop an attitude in its sound."

In a more critical review, reporter Mikael Wood of The Los Angeles Times felt the album was too heavy on "zippy pop-country arrangements" and that the trio's trademark harmonies suffered at the expense of tempo. Marc Hirsh of The Boston Globe found the album's sequencing to be ineffective, drawing particular attention to the way the album "seems to simply stop" due to a lack of finality in the closing track, "Just a Girl", and criticized the band for being formulaic in their approach.

== Commercial performance ==
747 received early predictions that the album would debut in the top ten and sell around 70,000 units. The album debuted at number two on the US Billboard 200 chart, selling 74,000 copies in its first week. This became Lady Antebellum's sixth US top-ten debut. The album also debuted at number two on the US Top Country Albums chart. As of September 2015, the album has sold 285,900 copies in the United States.

In Canada, the album debuted at number three on the Canadian Albums Chart, selling 8,000 copies in its first week. On November 4, 2014, the album was certified gold by Music Canada for sales of over 40,000 copies.

== Track listing ==
No.	Title	Writer(s)	Lead Vocals	Length
1.	"Long Stretch of Love"	Hillary Scott; Charles Kelley; Dave Haywood; Josh Kear	Charles Kelley, Hillary Scott	2:51
2.	"Bartender"	Scott; Kelley; Haywood; Rodney Clawson	Scott	3:18
3.	"Lie with Me"	Marc Beeson; Abe Stoklasa	Kelley, Scott	3:21
4.	"Freestyle"	Scott; Kelley; Haywood; Shane McAnally	Kelley	3:04
5.	"Down South"	Stephanie Chapman; Christian Rada; Dave Thompson	Scott	4:17
6.	"One Great Mystery"	Scott; Kelley; Haywood; Kear	Scott, Kelly	3:34
7.	"Sounded Good at the Time"	Scott; Kelley; Haywood; Brad Warren; Brett Warren	Scott	3:06
8.	"She Is"	Ben Rector; Jeff Pardo	Kelley	3:21
9.	"Damn You Seventeen"	Luke Laird; Clawson; McAnally	Scott, Kelley	4:01
10.	"747"	Gordie Sampson; Caitlyn Smith; Cary Barlowe	Kelley	3:27
11.	"Just a Girl"	Scott; Kelley; Haywood; McAnally	Scott	3:37
Total length:				37:57

747 — Deluxe edition bonus tracks
No.	Title	Writer(s)	Lead Vocals	Length
12.	"Slow Rollin'"	Clawson; Laird	Kelley	3:44
13.	"All Nighter"	Nicolle Galyon; David Hodges; Jimmy Robbins	Scott, Kelley	3:00
14.	"Falling for You"	Scott; Kelley; Haywood; Busbee	Scott, Kelley	3:54
Total length:				48:35

== Personnel ==
Lady Antebellum

- Dave Haywood – background vocals, acoustic guitar, bouzouki, electric guitar, mandolin
- Charles Kelley – lead vocals, background vocals, tambourine
- Hillary Scott – lead vocals, background vocals

Design

- Amy Fucci – design
- Mary Hilliard Harrington – art direction
- Daniel Miller – art direction
- Nino Muñoz – photography
- Karen Naff – art direction
- Josh Newman – art direction, design

Musicians

- Steve Bryant – bass guitar
- Tom Bukovac – electric guitar
- Sarah Buxton – background vocals
- Nathan Chapman – acoustic guitar, banjo, electric guitar, keyboards, mandolin, programming
- Stuart Duncan – fiddle
- Steve Fishell – steel guitar
- Shannon Forrest – drums, percussion
- Josh Kear – programming
- Eric Kinney – keyboards, programming
- Tim Lauer – keyboards
- Tom Lombardo – acoustic guitar, electric guitar
- Rob McNelley – electric guitar
- Michael Rhodes – bass guitar
- Michael Rojas – Hammond B-3 organ, keyboards
- Michael Stuckey – programming
- Dave Thompson – banjo, bass guitar, electric guitar, keyboards, percussion, programming

Production

- Sam Flora and Corrine Parish – lyrics
- Chuck Ainlay – engineering
- Keith Armstrong – mixing assistant
- Kyle Connors – assistant engineer
- Sean R. Badum – engineering
- Jason Campbell – production coordination
- Nathan Chapman – engineering, production
- Ted Jensen – mastering
- Nick Kallstrom – engineering
- Eric Kinney – engineering, production
- Lady Antebellum – production
- Chris Lord-Alge – mixing
- Ernesto Olivera – engineering
- Dave Thompson – engineering, production
- Chris Wilkinson – assistant engineering, engineering
- Brian David Willis – engineering

== Charts ==
=== Weekly charts ===
Chart (2014–15)	Peak position
Australian Albums (ARIA)	4
Belgian Albums (Ultratop Flanders)	125
Canadian Albums (Billboard)	3
Dutch Albums (Album Top 100)	78
German Albums (Offizielle Top 100)	68
New Zealand Albums (RMNZ)	22
Swiss Albums (Schweizer Hitparade)	24
UK Albums (Official Charts)	12
UK Country Albums (Official Charts)	1
US Billboard 200	2
US Top Country Albums (Billboard)	2

=== Year-end charts ===
Chart (2014)	Position
Australian Country Albums (ARIA)	5
US Billboard 200	133
US Top Country Albums (Billboard)	31
Chart (2015)	Position
Australian Country Albums (ARIA)	10
US Billboard 200	191
US Top Country Albums (Billboard)	29

=== Singles ===
Year	Single	Peak chart positions					Certifications (sales threshold)
Year	Single	US Country	US Country Airplay	US	CAN Country	CAN	Certifications (sales threshold)
2014	"Bartender"	4	1	31	1	29	CAN: Platinum; US: Platinum
2014	"Freestyle"	24	16	101	17	—	
2015	"Long Stretch of Love"	23	16	106	34	—	
"—" denotes releases that did not chart or were not released to that region

== Certifications ==
Region	Certification	Certified units/sales
Canada (Music Canada)	Gold	40,000^{^}
New Zealand (RMNZ)	Platinum	15,000^{‡}
United States	—	300,000
^{^} Shipments figures based on certification alone.
