= Maine Savings Amphitheater =

Open-air amphitheater

Coordinates: 44.79456°N 68.77323°W

- Waterfront Concerts Bangor
- Interactive map of Maine Savings Amphitheater
- Full name: Maine Savings Amphitheater
- Former names: Bangor Waterfront Pavilion (2010-13); Darling’s Waterfront Pavilion (2013-2022)
- Address: 1 Railroad St; Bangor, ME 04401; Bangor; USA
- Location: Waterfront Park
- Owner: City of Bangor
- Operator: Waterfront Concerts Live Nation
- Seating type: Reserved Seating, General Admission, Standing room, Premium Suites / VIP Seating, Club seating / bar and balcony
- Capacity: up to 16,500
- Executive suites: 4 Club Suites, 10 Corporate Suites, 60 Box Seats, 1 Backstage Premium Seat Club
- Type: Outdoor Amphitheatre, Music venue, Concert Venue, Amphitheater
- Event: Contemporary

Construction
- Opened: July 27, 2010
- Renovated: 2013
- Expanded: 2018
- Cost: $30 million (est.)
- Architect: Ervin Architecture
- Main contractor: Thornton Construction Lindsey Foundations Inc Hampden Electrical

The Maine Savings Amphitheater (previously known as the Bangor Waterfront Pavilion, and Darling's Waterfront Pavilion) is an open-air amphitheater located within the Waterfront Park in Bangor, Maine. The venue is a temporary structure built alongside the Penobscot River. The venue typically operates from July until October.

It is home to the Waterfront Concert Series.

== About ==
The amphitheater opened July 27, 2010, with a concert by Celtic Woman. Owned by the city of Bangor, the venue can house up to 15,000 spectators depending on configuration. In 2012, a proposal was submitted to the City Council to make the amphitheater a permanent venue. The council voted to keep the venue but declined its transition to a permanent stage. Renovation were made in 2013 to maintain the grounds, adhere to noise ordinances and expand the venue from 8,000 to 16,500. The venue features flexible stage front area that can be configured for reserve or general admission seating, 6,400 permanent stadium seats, and general admission lawn space.

A University of Maine study in 2013 showed that the economic impact of the Waterfront Concert series totaled more than $30 million since 2010.
