= BankNH Pavilion =

Concert venue in New Hampshire, U.S.

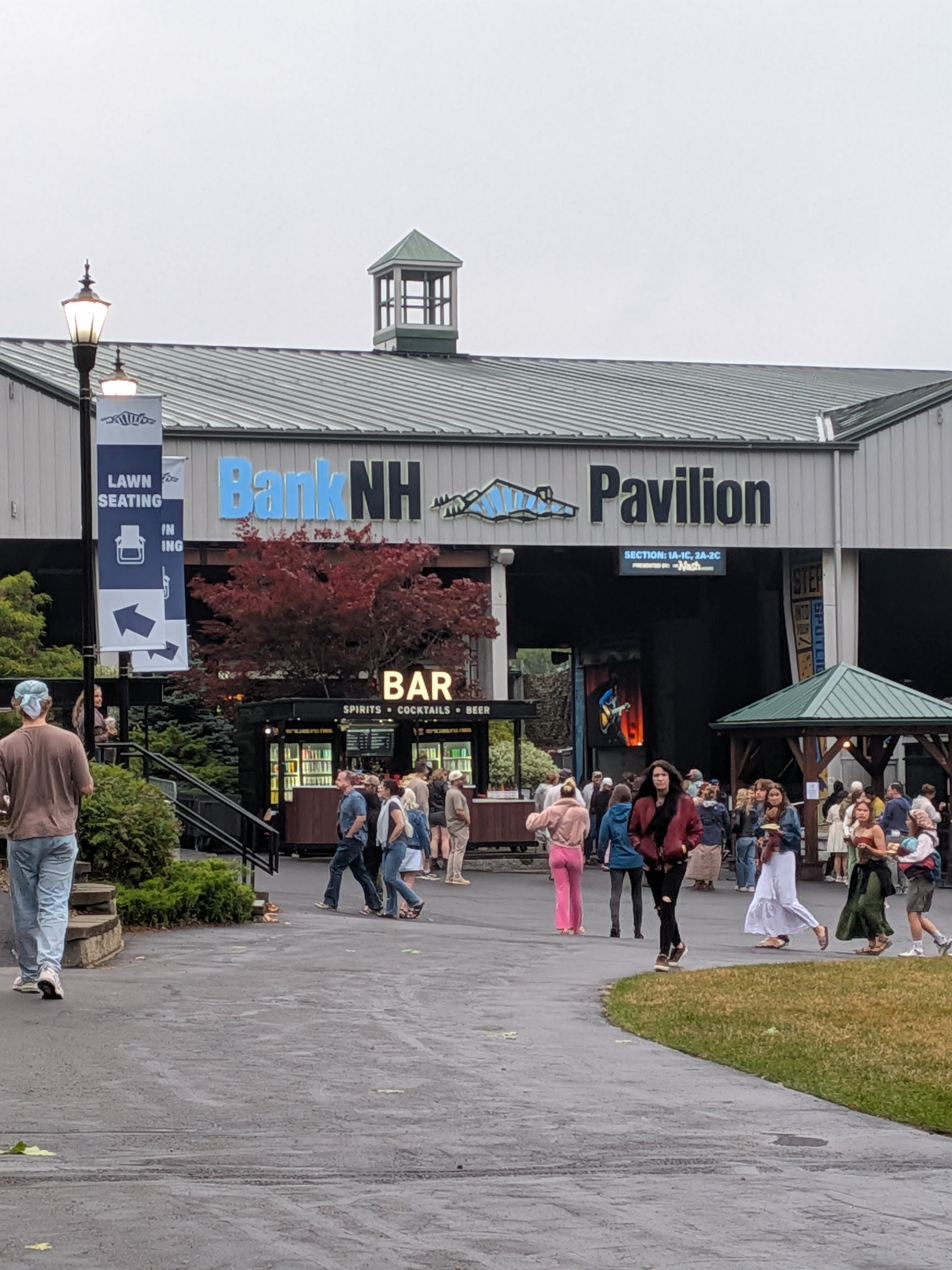
- entrance
- Interactive map of BankNH Pavilion
- Former names: Meadowbrook Farm (1996–2001); Meadowbrook Musical Arts Center (2001–07); Meadowbrook U.S. Cellular Pavilion (2007–13); Bank of New Hampshire Pavilion (2013–2023); BankNH Pavilion (2023–present)
- Address: 72 Meadowbrook Ln; Gilford, New Hampshire, U.S.
- Coordinates: 43°34′48″N 71°24′47″W
- Owner: Meadowbrook Amphitheater Holdings
- Operator: Live Nation
- Capacity: 9,000

Construction
- Opened: August 16, 1996

Website
- www.banknhpavilion.com

BankNH Pavilion (originally known as Meadowbrook Farm) is an outdoor amphitheatre located near Lake Winnipesaukee in Gilford, New Hampshire, United States. Opening in 1996, the venue seats nearly 9,000 guests. It seats 5,997 under a covered pavilion, 540 reserved lawn seats and 2,850 general admission lawn seats.

== History ==
The land was originally owned by the Miller family, which used the property for summer vacations, weekend excursions, and general family entertainment. By the early 1900s, cottages began to pop up on the property. The family continued to use the land to hold family concerts and gatherings for many years ahead. While ownership of the land where the venue is located changed hands, the Miller family today still owns property next to the pavilion.

In early 1996, Meadowbrook was created as a summer concert venue. Originally known as "Meadowbrook Farm", the venue consisted of a temporary stage, 2,500 portable seats and a lawn that held 2,000 people. The venue was renamed five years later to the "Meadowbrook Musical Arts Center", to better reflect the growing direction of the farm. A permanent stage soon replaced the temporary one. In 2002, the venue began its most major renovation to date. A pavilion roof was installed, along with 3,097 reserved seats (with capabilities to remove seats if necessary for general admission shows), 540 reserved lawn seats, and 2,850 general admission lawn seats.

In 2005, Meadowbrook added its Second Stage, a tented area with a full-service bar where local bands play for concertgoers prior to and following the actual concert. In 2007, U.S. Cellular signed a naming agreement with the venue, which became the "Meadowbrook U.S. Cellular Pavilion". Also in 2007, Meadowbrook was nominated for Venue of the Year by the Academy of Country Music. In 2013, Meadowbrook began an expansion that added nearly 3,000 covered seats, two new parking lots and a second road into the venue. The amphitheater was renamed "Bank of New Hampshire Pavilion" in April of that year.

Sugarland currently holds the venue's attendance record. Their September 5, 2010 performance there - with Ellis Paul opening - was the second time in two years that a Sugarland show was a sell-out.

In 2021, the Pavilion made national news when the Gilford Police Department issued an arrest warrant for artist Marilyn Manson in response to an incident in which Manson allegedly spit on a videographer while performing at the Pavilion in 2019.

In 2023, the Pavilion underwent another rebrand and is now called the BankNH Pavilion.

== See also ==
- List of contemporary amphitheatres
