= Bartender (Lady Antebellum song) =

Single by Lady Antebellum

from the album 747
- Released: May 19, 2014
- Recorded: 2013–14
- Genre: Country pop; pop rock
- Length: 3:18
- Label: Capitol Nashville
- Songwriters: Dave Haywood; Charles Kelley; Hillary Scott; Rodney Clawson
- Producers: Nathan Chapman; Lady Antebellum

Lady Antebellum singles chronology
"Compass" (2013)	"Bartender" (2014)	"Freestyle" (2014)

"Bartender" is a song written and recorded by American country music trio Lady Antebellum. Written by group members Dave Haywood, Charles Kelley, and Hillary Scott along with Rodney Clawson, and co-produced with Nathan Chapman, the song was released to country radio by Capitol Nashville on May 12, 2014, as the lead single from the group's sixth studio album, 747, and it features lead vocals from Scott. It was released to iTunes the following week, on May 19, 2014. In its first week at radio, "Bartender" was the second most-added song of the week (with 72), behind "Small Town Throwdown" by Brantley Gilbert featuring Justin Moore and Thomas Rhett.

== Music video ==
The music video was directed by Shane Drake and premiered on the Today Show on June 19, 2014. It co-stars model Kate Upton and Veep/Arrested Development actor Tony Hale.

=== Synopsis ===
The video begins with a woman (Upton) sitting in front of a vanity, receiving a phone call from a friend (Scott). The friend invites her to go out to a bar together with some friends to "forget his name."

At the bar they receive and go through many rounds challenges by the bartender (Hale). They beat the bartender and celebrate. There are cuts to performance scenes of the band during the video.

All three members are performing in the chandelier.

== Live performances ==
Lady Antebellum debuted the song during the American Idol season thirteen finale on May 21, 2014. Two days later on the 23, they performed the song on Good Morning America. They have also performed "Bartender" on the Late Show with David Letterman and the 2014 CMT Music Awards on June 4, 2014. They performed "Bartender" on CMA Festival: Country's Night on August 5, 2014. On September 30, 2014, the trio performed the song on the Today Show.

== Critical reception ==
Matt Bjorke of Roughstock rated the song four stars out of five and spoke positively of the "fresh, new sound" the group is exploring. "The sing-song-y nature of ['Bartender's bridge and chorus] give the song some bite and make it the kind of song that should've always followed up 'Need You Now'" said Bjorke. "'Bartender' starts a new and exciting chapter in Lady Antebellum's career and gives us something to really look forward to with their follow-up to last year's Golden". Melinda Newman of HitFix placed "Bartender" at number 4 (of 21) on the website's Top Summer Songs of 2014, writing that "the upbeat melody and the time-honored tradition of drinking to forget, not to mention the banjo at the end, make this tune too much fun to be a downer".

== Chart performance ==
"Bartender" debuted at No. 43 on the Billboard Country Airplay chart for the week ending May 31, 2014, soon reaching the top spot. It also debuted at No. 40 on Billboard Adult Pop Songs in November, their first song to manage crossing over to adult contemporary radio since "Just a Kiss" and reaching No. 25 to date. The song was certified Gold by the RIAA on September 11, 2014 and was certified Platinum on September 23, 2014. The song reached its millionth sales mark in the US in November 2014, and as of January 2015, it has sold 1,118,000 downloads. In Canada, the song was also certified Platinum, indicating digital downloads in excess of 80,000 units.

== Charts and certifications ==
=== Weekly charts ===
Chart (2014)	Peak position
Canada Hot 100 (Billboard)	29
Canada Country (Billboard)	1
US Billboard Hot 100	31
US Country Airplay (Billboard)	1
US Hot Country Songs (Billboard)	4
US Adult Pop Airplay (Billboard)	25

=== Year-end charts ===
Chart (2014)	Position
Canada Canadian Hot 100	82
US Billboard Hot 100	81
US Country Airplay (Billboard)	18
US Hot Country Songs (Billboard)	7

=== Certifications ===
Region	Certification	Certified units/sales
Canada (Music Canada)	Platinum	80,000^{*}
United States (RIAA)	Platinum	1,118,000
^{*} Sales figures based on certification alone.

== Release history ==
Country	Date	Format	Ref.
United States	May 12, 2014	Country radio	
Canada	May 19, 2014	Digital download	
United States	May 19, 2014	Digital download	
United States	October 13, 2014	Hot adult contemporary	
