= Songland =

American songwriting competition series

- Genre: Reality competition
- Created by: David A. Stewart
- Directed by: Ivan Dudynsky
- Starring: Ester Dean; Shane McAnally; Ryan Tedder
- Composer: Jared Gutstadt
- Country of origin: United States
- Original language: English
- No. of seasons: 2
- No. of episodes: 21

Production
- Executive producers: Audrey Morrissey; Ivan Dudynsky; Adam Levine; Dave Stewart; Chad Hines
- Running time: 43 minutes
- Production companies: Universal Television Alternative Studio; 222 Productions; Live Animals Productions; Dave Stewart Entertainment

Original release
- Network: NBC
- Release: May 28, 2019 – June 15, 2020

Songland is an American songwriting competition series that aired on NBC from May 28, 2019, to June 15, 2020. The show, produced in cooperation with the Universal Television Alternative Studio, 222 Productions, Live Animals Productions and Dave Stewart, sets out to give undiscovered songwriters a chance to create a hit. It gives the viewers a look at the creative process in action. Contestants are selected to work with producers and a recording artist to release a song. The show tries to elevate the traditional role of the songwriter in the process of creating music from "unpleasant secret" to being the celebrated "magic ingredient". Stewart, a musician and composer formerly of Eurythmics, conceived Songland.

The show premiered in May 2019, with three producer-hosts: producer and songwriter Ester Dean; producer and OneRepublic frontman Ryan Tedder; and songwriter Shane McAnally. In September 2019, the series was renewed, and the second season premiered in April 2020.

According to Heavy.com, many of the first season's songs picked by the guest artists for release hit No. 1 on an iTunes chart. Songland was the top new show of summer 2019 "in the key adults 18-49 demographic and among total viewers, according to Nielsen's "most current" metric, which counts a week's worth of delayed viewing per episode where available".

== Premise ==
Each episode, producers Ryan Tedder, Ester Dean and Shane McAnally team up with songwriters to create the next big hit to be recorded by the guest performing artist. Four seemingly unknown songwriters audition songs they have written live for the producers and that episode's guest star(s). They do so in Songland's makeshift recording studio equipped with sound mixing equipment, and sometimes with live musicians and extra singers. They immediately get feedback for the song's lyrics, message, and musical construction, often with specific ways to improve the track. Reviewer Nancy Stetson commented:

It's enlightening to see how a song can change just by slowing it down or speeding it up, or moving the chorus, or emphasizing the beat or shuffling parts around.

From four prospective songs, three are chosen and matched up with one each of the three producers to develop a final version for approval; those re-worked songs are then sung again with one chosen as the winner. The winning track is released the same night as the episode is aired, with the viewers witnessing a song produced for consumption in roughly 45 minutes.

== Production ==
Musician and composer David A. Stewart, formerly of Eurythmics, conceived Songland. Songland attempts to rework the often thankless and grueling job of songwriting. The general public rarely notes who wrote the lyrics, or the music that catches attention, instead the credit is generally given to the singer, the typical narrative being that they're anonymous "cogs in the well-oiled pop (music) machine". A song is optioned, sometimes passed to other artists, who may wait months or years to record it, or just a hook from it, and all for the singer's own glory. The show tries to elevate the traditional role of the songwriter in the process of creating music from "unpleasant secret" to being the celebrated "magic ingredient".

The show premiered in May 2019, with three producer-hosts: producer and songwriter Ester Dean; producer and lead singer of OneRepublic Ryan Tedder; and songwriter Shane McAnally. In 2016, an entertainment lawyer advised prospective songwriters from signing the show's contract as they would be giving it the rights to their work whether chosen or not. The show responded, "We wish to be abundantly clear that by signing the casting application, songwriters do not transfer ownership of any of their original songs. This show is truly a celebration of songwriters and their craft."

== Episodes ==
Color key:

Songwriter's track won, the recording is released by the musical guest
Songwriter was in the top three
Songwriter eliminated before final round

=== Season 1 (2019) ===
==== Episode 1 (May 28, 2019) ====
- Musical guest: John Legend

Order	Songwriter	Song	Producer	Result
1	Max Embers	"Back Home" (retitled "Lookin' Up")	Ryan Tedder	Top 3
2	Tebby Burrows	"We Need Love"	Shane McAnally	Winner
3	Sam James	"Shinedown"	—N/a	Eliminated
4	Ollie Gabriel	"Something New"	Ester Dean	Top 3

Notes: John Legend chose the song from Bahamian-born and Miami-based Tebby Burrows because he felt that, of the four songs, it had "the biggest journey from where it was to where it is now." "We Need Love" hit No. 1 on the iTunes R&B chart.

==== Episode 2 (June 4, 2019) ====
- Musical guest: will.i.am

Order	Songwriter	Song	Producer	Result
1	Josh Logan	"Boxes"	Shane McAnally	Top 3
2	Charisma	"Invincible"	Ryan Tedder	Top 3
3	Adam Friedman	"Be Nice"	Ester Dean	Winner
4	Ray Goren	"Oh Lord"	—N/a	Eliminated

Notes: will.i.am opted to record all three finalist songs; at the end of the episode he announced that he would remove three songs from Black Eyed Peas' next album Translation (2020), to add "Be Nice", as well as "Boxes" and "Invincible". He also told fourth place Ray Goren that "Oh Lord" is "a career-making song he should record for himself", and that he would be a featured singer on Goren's track. "Be Nice" hit No. 1 on the iTunes Rock Charts.

==== Episode 3 (June 11, 2019) ====
- Musical guest: Kelsea Ballerini

Order	Songwriter	Song	Producer	Result
1	Jack Newsome	"Lying (Next to You)"	Shane McAnally	Top 3
2	Jess Jocoy	"Easy"	—N/a	Eliminated
3	Daniel Feels	"Crush"	Ester Dean	Top 3
4	Darius Coleman	"Better Luck Next Time"	Ryan Tedder	Winner

Notes: Kelsea Ballerini is the first country music artist on the show, and said that she is attracted to songs that provoke a strong reaction in her, whether that reaction is dancing or crying. She added that Darius Coleman had created a country hook whether he intended to or not. "Better Luck Next Time" charted No. 1 on the iTunes Pop Chart, and No. 2 on the iTunes Overall Charts.

==== Episode 4 (June 18, 2019) ====
- Musical guest: Jonas Brothers

Order	Songwriter	Song	Producer	Result
1	Able Heart	"Greenlight"	Ester Dean	Winner
2	Remmi	"Flickering" (retitled "Do You Think of Me?")	Ryan Tedder	Top 3
3	Ori	"No Pressure"	—N/a	Eliminated
4	Rynn	"Crowded Places"	Shane McAnally	Top 3

Notes: Philadelphia songwriter and beatmaker Able Heart has been a ghost-writer up until the show; he also had never sung live. The Jonas Brothers' "Greenlight" went to #1 on the U.S. iTunes sales charts, and hit No. 1 on the iTunes Overall Charts.

==== Episode 5 (June 25, 2019) ====
- Musical guest: Meghan Trainor

Order	Songwriter	Song	Producer	Result
1	Brandin Jay	"No Money Alright" (retitled "We Got Us")	Ester Dean	Top 3
2	Kole	"Hurt Me"	Ryan Tedder	Winner
3	Zachary Kale	"All Over Again"	—N/a	Eliminated
4	Josh Wood	"Alone"	Shane McAnally	Top 3

Notes: Trainor picked the song because of its lyrics "about the aftermath of a breakup and making sure you always rise above the drama" being empowering. "Hurt Me" is "a fun and sassy dance-pop cut" with "a hooky jam".

==== Episode 6 (July 2, 2019) ====
- Musical guest: Aloe Blacc

Order	Songwriter	Song	Producer	Result
1	Kyle Williams	"Getting Started"	Ryan Tedder	Winner
2	Afika	"Chosen"	—N/a	Eliminated
3	TVTE	"Call for a Hero"	Ester Dean	Top 3
4	Steve Fee	"Same Blood"	Shane McAnally	Top 3, released as a single

Notes: The winning song, "Getting Started" by Kyle Williams a.k.a. producer Willyecho, was used for the Fast & Furious spin-off Hobbs & Shaw (August 2019) directed by David Leitch, who helped decide on the song which features rapper JID. They were looking for a “song that is motivational and inspiring with swagger”. Aloe Blacc also chose to record "Same Blood" by Steve Fee. "Chosen", the fourth-place finisher from Afika, was also released. TVTE's "Call for a Hero" was retitled "Hero" for the official version.

==== Episode 7 (August 14, 2019) ====
- Musical guest: Macklemore

Order	Songwriter	Song	Producer	Result
1	IRO	"Shadow"	Shane McAnally	Winner
2	Pop Culture	"City Kids" (retitled "Unforgettable")	Ryan Tedder	Top 3
3	Chris Jobe	"It Could Have Been You"	—N/a	Eliminated
4	Casey Cook	"Judgements"	Ester Dean	Top 3

Notes: Macklemore released the single "Shadow" as a collaboration with Iro, it reached No. 1 on the iTunes Hip-Hop/Rap Chart.

==== Episode 8 (August 21, 2019) ====
- Musical guest: Old Dominion

Order	Songwriter	Song	Producer	Result
1	Katelyn Tarver	"Young"	Shane McAnally	Winner
2	Jacobi.e	"Westside" (retitled "Where the Road Ends")	Ryan Tedder	Top 3
3	MACI	"Take a Ride"	—N/a	Eliminated
4	Jake Scott	"Is This Love?" (retitled "Journey")	Ester Dean	Top 3

Notes: The winning song "Young" is featured on Jeep commercial. Katelyn Tarver, the winning songwriter, also starred in the commercial.

==== Episode 9 (August 28, 2019) ====
- Musical guest: Leona Lewis

Order	Songwriter	Song	Producer	Result
1	Olivia Lane	"Perfect Skin"	Ester Dean	Top 3
2	Rozee	"Fighting For Us" (retitled "Solo Quiero (Somebody to Love)"/"All I Want")	Ryan Tedder	Winner
3	Rafferty	"A Heart Full of Love" (retitled "When You Fall In Love")	Shane McAnally	Top 3
4	Annabel Lee	"Ugliest Love"	—N/a	Eliminated

Notes: "Solo Quiero (Somebody to Love)" by Leona Lewis, Cali y El Dandee and Juan Magán reached No. 1 on the iTunes Latino chart. The song has also peaked at number one on several US Billboard Latin charts, including the Latin Digital Song Sales.

==== Episode 10 (September 4, 2019) ====
- Musical guest: Charlie Puth

Order	Songwriter	Song	Producer	Result
1	Sam DeRosa	"Pill for This"	Shane McAnally	Top 3
2	Zach Sorgen	"Habits" (retitled "Bad Habit")	Ryan Tedder	Winner
3	Paris Williams	"Pity Party"	—N/a	Eliminated
4	Joel Adams	"Hate Love"	Ester Dean	Top 3

Notes: Even though Charlie Puth picked Zach Sorgen's song "Bad Habit", he did not release a version instead opting to give the song back to Sorgen to release himself.

==== Episode 11 (September 11, 2019) ====
- Musical guest: OneRepublic

With Tedder serving as the musical guest, Jason Evigan served as a guest producer.

Order	Songwriter	Song	Producer	Result
1	JT Roach	"Somebody to Love"	Shane McAnally	Winner
2	Madi	"Darkest Days"	Ester Dean	Top 3
3	Tyler James Bellinger	"Giving You Up"	—N/a	Eliminated
4	Brigetta	"Be Somebody"	Jason Evigan	Top 3

Notes: OneRepublic's "Somebody to Love" went to #1 on the U.S. iTunes sales charts, two days after the official release. The song was included on the group's album Human (2021), as the promotional single.

Winning Producers (Season 1)

Producer	Wins
Shane McAnally	4
Ester Dean	2
Ryan Tedder	5

=== Season 2 (2020) ===
==== Episode 1 (April 13, 2020) ====
- Musical guest: Lady Antebellum

Order	Songwriter	Song	Producer	Result
1	Tim Halperin	"Losing You"	Ryan Tedder	Top 3
2	Steven Battey	"Feels Good to Me"	—N/a	Eliminated
3	Madeline Merlo	"I’ll Drink to That" (retitled "Champagne Night")	Shane McAnally	Winner
4	Ryan Innes	"Long Way Home"	Ester Dean	Top 3

Notes:

- "Champagne Night" hit the number one spot on the US iTunes sales chart, and remained in the top ten the following week.
- "Long Way Home", written by Ryan Innes, was later chosen as an original song for The Voice winner Todd Tilghman during the season 18 finale, with Shane McAnally and Ester Dean co-producing. The song also reached the number one spot on the US iTunes sales chart upon its release. "Long Way Home" eventually became Tilghman's coronation song following his victory the day after its release.

==== Episode 2 (April 20, 2020) ====
- Musical guest: Luis Fonsi

Order	Songwriter	Song	Producer	Result
1	Dyson	"Conditions" (retitled "Lost in Translation")	Shane McAnally	Top 3
2	Pipobeats	"Sway"	Ryan Tedder	Winner
3	Lauren Martinez	"I Don't Want to Know"	Ester Dean	Top 3
4	Corii	"What If"	—N/a	Eliminated

Notes: “Sway” hit the number one spot on the US iTunes sales chart. Season 1 contestant IRO returned to provide vocals on Dyson's "Lost In Translation" for the final presentation phase. Luis Fonsi became the first Puerto Rico singer-songwriter on the show.

==== Episode 3 (April 27, 2020) ====
- Musical guest: H.E.R.

Order	Songwriter	Song	Producer	Result
1	Axel Mansoor	"Scary"	Ester Dean	Top 3
2	Milly	"Safe Place"	—N/a	Eliminated
3	Jocelyn Alice	"How Could You Not Know?"	Shane McAnally	Top 3
4	Raquel Castro	"Wrong Places"	Ryan Tedder	Winner

==== Episode 4 (May 4, 2020) ====
- Musical guest: Martina McBride

Order	Songwriter	Song	Producer	Result
1	CKAY	"Hero"	Shane McAnally	Top 3
2	Halie	"Girls Like Me"	Ester Dean	Winner
3	WOLVES	"Miracle"	—N/a	Eliminated
4	Jeffrey James	"We Can Be (Heroes)" (retitled "We Can Be Heroes")	Ryan Tedder	Top 3

==== Episode 5 (May 11, 2020) ====
- Musical guest: Julia Michaels

Order	Songwriter	Song	Producer	Result
1	Keegan Bost	"Glad You Came" (retitled "Give It to You")	Ryan Tedder	Winner
2	Jenna Lotti	"Sad Girls"	Shane McAnally	Top 3
3	Jeremy Shayne	"Too Late”	—N/a	Eliminated
4	Dan Burke	"Numb"	Ester Dean	Top 3

==== Episode 6 (May 18, 2020) ====
- Musical guest: Florida Georgia Line

Order	Songwriter	Song	Producer	Result
1	Shawn Austin	"Ain’t Going Nowhere" (retitled "Lean On")	Ester Dean	Top 3
2	Lukr	"Hopes High" (retitled "What You're Puttin' Down")	Ryan Tedder	Top 3
3	Victoria Banks	"That's a Country Song"	—N/a	Eliminated
4	Griffen Palmer	"Second Guessing"	Shane McAnally	Winner

==== Episode 7 (May 25, 2020) ====
- Musical guest: Boyz II Men

Order	Songwriter	Song	Producer	Result
1	Zak Waters	"Bad Things"	Ryan Tedder	Top 3
2	Juan & Lisa Winans	"Maybe" (retitled "What If It's Love")	Shane McAnally	Top 3
3	Charles Infamous	"Jukebox"	—N/a	Eliminated
4	ChrisLee	"Love Struck"	Ester Dean	Winner

Notes: Boyz II Men opted to record all three finalist songs.

==== Episode 8 (June 1, 2020) ====
- Musical guest: Bebe Rexha

Order	Songwriter	Song	Producer	Result
1	Greg Scott	"Miracle"	Ryan Tedder	Split Winner
2	Alyssa Newton	"Made for Something"	—N/a	Eliminated
3	Anna Graceman	"Gold" (retitled "Bones")	Shane McAnally	Split Winner
4	Josh Vida	"Crazy Enough" (retitled "Sideline")	Ester Dean	Top 3

Notes: In a first for the series, Rexha combined "Miracle" by Scott and "Bones" by Graceman for the winning song that was set be used to promote the 2020 Summer Olympics before it was replaced with "Remember This" by Jonas Brothers. Season 1 contestant Sam DeRosa returned to provide vocals on Scott's "Miracle" for the final presentation phase.

==== Episode 9 (June 8, 2020) ====
- Musical guest: Ben Platt

Order	Songwriter	Song	Producer	Result
1	David Davis	"Everything It Took to Get to You" (retitled "Everything I Did to Get to You")	Ryan Tedder	Winner
2	Kylie Rothfield	"Lonely" (retitled "Ghost")	Ester Dean	Top 3
3	Caroline Kole	"Fool’s Gold"	Shane McAnally	Top 3
4	Anna Hamilton	"Deathbed"	—N/a	Eliminated

==== Episode 10 (June 15, 2020) ====
- Musical guest: Usher

Order	Songwriter	Song	Producer	Result
1	Miranda Glory	"Salty" (retitled "No Cap (Missing You)")	Ryan Tedder	Top 3
2	Ryan Cam	"Staying Over" (retitled "California")	Ester Dean	Winner
3	David Wade	"Horse ‘N Carriage" (retitled "Personal")	Shane McAnally	Top 3
4	Fatherdude	"Billions"	—N/a	Eliminated

Winning Producers (Season 2)

Producer	Wins
Shane McAnally	3
Ester Dean	3
Ryan Tedder	5

== The Voice 2020 finale crossover ==
For the finale of The Voice, Songland songwriters and producers Shane McAnally, Ester Dean, and Ryan Tedder were recruited to help each of the five finalists with original songs. The contestants, because of the COVID-19 pandemic, consulted and performed remotely.

Singer	Songwriter	Song	Producer	Result
Micah Iverson ft. Team Kelly Clarkson	Troy Ogletree, Jason Strong	"Butterflies"	Shane McAnally	Fifth place
CammWess ft. Team John Legend	CammWess, John Legend	"Save It For Tomorrow"	Ryan Tedder	Fourth place
Thunderstorm Artis ft. Team Nick Jonas	Thunderstorm Artis	"Sedona"	Ryan Tedder	Third place
Toneisha Harris ft. Team Blake Shelton	Toneisha Harris	"My Superhero"	Shane McAnally	Runner-up (Note: The Voice Twitter page confirmed Toneisha Harris placed second, leaving Thunderstorm Artis in third place.)
Todd Tilghman ft. Team Blake Shelton	Shane McAnally, Ester Dean and Ryan Innes	"Long Way Home"	Shane McAnally and Ester Dean	Winner

Notes: Todd Tilghman from Team Blake Shelton became the first and the only contestant of the eighteenth season to reach top ten on iTunes. His original song's studio recording hit #1 on iTunes Overall Chart and iTunes Country Chart.

== List of songs premiered on Songland ==
This is a list of songs that appeared on the show that have been released by the guest artists, or through the songwriters. Sounds Like Nashville noted, “All of the songs from Songland are available digitally for purchase or streaming”.

Episode	Song	Performer	Songwriter
1.1	"We Need Love"	John Legend	Tebby Burrows
1.1	"Lookin' Up"	Max Embers	
1.1	"Something New"	Ollie Gabriel	
1.2	"Be Nice"	The Black Eyed Peas feat. Snoop Dogg	Adam Friedman
1.2	"Boxes"	The Black Eyed Peas	Josh Logan
1.2	"Invincible"	The Black Eyed Peas	Charisma
1.2	"Oh Lord"	Ray Goren	
1.3	"Better Luck Next Time"	Kelsea Ballerini	Darius Coleman
1.3	"Lying (Next to You)"	Jack Newsome	
1.3	"Crush"	Daniel Feels & Annie Schindel	Daniel Feels
1.3	"Easy"	Jess Jocoy	
1.4	"Greenlight"	Jonas Brothers	Able Heart
1.4	"Do You Think of Me?"	Remmi	
1.4	"Crowded Places"	Rynn	
1.5	"Hurt Me"	Meghan Trainor	Kole
1.5	"We Got Us"	Brandin Jay	
1.5	"Alone"	Josh Wood	
1.5	"All Over Again"	Zachary Kale	
1.6	"Getting Started"	Aloe Blacc feat. JID	Kyle Williams
1.6	"Same Blood"	Aloe Blacc	Steve Fee
1.6	"Chosen"	Afika	
1.6	"Hero"	TVTE	
1.7	"Shadow"	Macklemore feat. Iro	Iro
1.7	"Judgements"	Casey Cook	
1.7	"Unforgettable"	Pop Culture	
1.7	"It Could've Been You"	Chris Jobe	
1.8	"Young"	Old Dominion	Katelyn Tarver
1.8	"Journey"	Jake Scott	
1.8	"Take a Ride"	MACI	
1.9	"Solo Quiero (Somebody to Love)"	Leona Lewis, Cali y El Dandee & Juan Magán	Rozee
1.9	"Perfect Skin"	Olivia Lane	
1.9	"When You Fall In Love"	Rafferty	
1.9	"Ugliest Love"	Annabel Lee	
1.10	"Bad Habit"	Zach Sorgen	
1.10	"Pill for This"	Sam DeRosa	
1.10	"Hate Love"	Joel Adams	
1.11	"Somebody to Love"	OneRepublic	JT Roach
1.11	"Be Somebody"	Brigetta	
1.11	"Darkest Days"	MADI	
1.11	"Giving You Up"	Tyler James Bellinger	
2.1	"Champagne Night"	Lady Antebellum	Madeline Merlo
2.1	"Long Way Home"	Todd Tilghman	Ryan Innes
2.1	"Losing You"	Tim Halperin	
2.2	"Sway"	Luis Fonsi	Pipobeats
2.2	"Lost in Translation"	Dyson	
2.2	"I Don't Want to Know"	Lauren Martinez	
2.2	"What If"	Corii feat. Bruce Wiegner	Corii
2.3	"Wrong Places"	H.E.R.	Raquel Castro
2.3	"Scary"	Axel Mansoor	
2.3	"How Could You Not Know?"	Jocelyn Alice	
2.4	"Girls Like Me"	Martina McBride	Halie
2.4	"Hero"	CKAY	
2.4	"We Can Be Heroes"	Jeffrey James	
2.5	"Give It to You"	Julia Michaels	Keegan Bost
2.5	"Sad Girls"	Jenna Lotti	
2.5	"Numb"	Dan Burke	
2.6	"Second Guessing"	Florida Georgia Line	Griffen Palmer
2.6	"Lean On"	Shawn Austin	
2.6	"What You're Puttin' Down"	Lukr	
2.7	"Love Struck"	Boyz II Men	ChrisLee
2.7	"Bad Things"	Boyz II Men	Zak Waters
2.7	"What If It's Love"	Boyz II Men	Juan & Lisa Winans
2.7	"Jukebox"	Charles Infamous feat. Tuck Ryan	Charles Infamous
2.8	"Miracle"	Bebe Rexha	Greg Scott & Anna Graceman
2.8	"Sideline"	Josh Vida	
2.8	"Made for Something"	Alyssa Newton	
2.9	"Everything I Did to Get to You"	Ben Platt	David Davis
2.9	"Ghost"	Kylie Rothfield	
2.9	"Fool’s Gold"	Caroline Kole	
2.10	"California"	Usher feat. Tyga	Ryan Cam
2.10	"No Cap (Missing You)"	Miranda Glory	
2.10	"Personal"	David Wade	
2.10	"Billions"	Fatherdude	

== Artists' appearances on other television shows ==
- Sam James was a contestant on the third season of The Voice, but was eliminated in the Knockout Rounds.
- Josh Logan was a contestant on season five of The Voice, but was eliminated in the Live Shows.
- Katelyn Tarver was a contestant on American Juniors. She is also known for her recurring role as Jo Taylor on Big Time Rush.
- Joel Adams previously competed on season four of The X Factor Australia, but was eliminated during the bootcamp round.
- Tim Halperin was a contestant on season ten of American Idol, but was eliminated in the Top 24.
- Ryan Innes was a contestant on season four of The Voice, but was eliminated in the Knockout Rounds.
- Raquel Castro was a contestant on the first season of The Voice, but was eliminated in the Live Shows.
- Anna Graceman was a finalist on season six of America's Got Talent.
- Kylie Rothfield was a contestant on season eleven of The Voice, but was eliminated during the Live Playoffs.
- Halie would later compete on the first season of American Song Contest, representing Missouri.
- Caroline Kole would later compete on season twenty-one of American Idol.
- Corii would later compete on season twenty-four of The Voice.

== Ratings ==
=== Season 1 ===
Viewership and ratings per episode of Songland
No.	Title	Air date	Timeslot (ET)	Rating/share (18–49)	Viewers (millions)	DVR (18–49)	DVR viewers (millions)	Total (18–49)	Total viewers (millions)
1	"John Legend"	May 28, 2019	Tuesday 10:00 p.m.	1.1/6	5.51	0.4	1.39	1.5	6.90
2	"will.i.am"	June 4, 2019	Tuesday 10:00 p.m.	1.0/6	4.53	0.3	1.19	1.3	5.72
3	"Kelsea Ballerini"	June 11, 2019	Tuesday 10:00 p.m.	0.9/5	4.15	0.3	1.16	1.2	5.31
4	"Jonas Brothers"	June 18, 2019	Tuesday 10:00 p.m.	0.9/5	4.53	0.4	1.28	1.3	5.79
5	"Meghan Trainor"	June 25, 2019	Tuesday 10:00 p.m.	0.9/5	4.27	0.3	1.06	1.2	5.34
6	"Aloe Blacc"	July 2, 2019	Tuesday 10:00 p.m.	0.7/4	3.45	0.3	1.02	1.0	4.48
7	"Macklemore"	August 14, 2019	Wednesday 9:00 p.m.	0.7/4	3.28	0.2	0.78	0.9	4.06
8	"Old Dominion"	August 21, 2019	Wednesday 9:00 p.m.	0.7/4	3.44	0.2	0.75	0.9	4.20
9	"Leona Lewis"	August 28, 2019	Wednesday 9:00 p.m.	0.7/4	3.34	0.2	0.76	0.9	4.10
10	"Charlie Puth"	September 4, 2019	Wednesday 9:00 p.m.	0.8/5	3.96	0.2	0.67	1.0	4.63
11	"OneRepublic"	September 11, 2019	Wednesday 9:00 p.m.	0.8/4	3.68	0.2	0.67	1.0	4.35

=== Season 2 ===
Viewership and ratings per episode of Songland
No.	Title	Air date	Timeslot (ET)	Rating/share (18–49)	Viewers (millions)	DVR (18–49)	DVR viewers (millions)	Total (18–49)	Total viewers (millions)
1	"Lady Antebellum"	April 13, 2020	Monday 10:00 p.m.	0.8/5	4.54	0.3	1.12	1.1	5.67
2	"Luis Fonsi"	April 20, 2020	Monday 10:00 p.m.	0.8/4	4.14	0.3	1.05	1.1	5.19
3	"H.E.R."	April 27, 2020	Monday 10:00 p.m.	0.6/3	3.30	0.2	0.93	0.8	4.15
4	"Martina McBride"	May 4, 2020	Monday 10:00 p.m.	0.6/4	3.65	0.3	1.02	0.9	4.67
5	"Julia Michaels"	May 11, 2020	Monday 10:00 p.m.	0.6/4	3.49	0.3	0.93	0.9	4.43
6	"Florida Georgia Line"	May 18, 2020	Monday 10:00 p.m.	0.7/4	3.82	0.2	0.96	0.9	4.79
7	"Boyz II Men"	May 25, 2020	Monday 10:00 p.m.	0.5/3	2.28	0.3	1.06	0.8	3.34
8	"Bebe Rexha"	June 1, 2020	Monday 10:00 p.m.	0.6/4	2.67	0.2	0.94	0.8	3.51
9	"Ben Platt"	June 8, 2020	Monday 10:00 p.m.	0.5/3	2.34	0.2	0.97	0.7	3.31
10	"Usher"	June 15, 2020	Monday 10:00 p.m.	0.5/4	2.42	0.3	1.01	0.8	3.43

== International adaptations ==
Songland Thailand premiered on TrueID on October 20, 2020. It is produced by GMM Grammy and Online Creator Club.
