= Bad Habits (Usher song) =

2020 song by Usher

Single by Usher
- Released: September 10, 2020
- Length: 4:17
- Label: Brand Usher; RCA
- Songwriters: Usher; Theron Thomas; Pierre Medor; Keith Thomas
- Producers: Pierre Medor; Lxrd Rossi

Usher singles chronology
"I Cry" (2020)	"Bad Habits" (2020)	"Too Much" (2020)

Music video
- "Bad Habits" on YouTube

"Bad Habits" is a song by American singer Usher. It was released as a single on September 10, 2020, via RCA Records. The song was written by Usher, Pierre Medor, Theron Thomas, and Keith Thomas, and samples Zapp's 1986 hit song "Computer Love". It was produced by Lxrd Rossi and Medor. A music video for the song, directed by Chris Robinson, was released simultaneously with the single.

== Background and release ==
"Bad Habits" is Usher's fourth song release of 2020, following the singles "I Cry", "SexBeat", and "Don't Waste My Time" featuring Ella Mai. Both "Don't Waste My Time" and "Bad Habits" peaked at number one on the Billboard Adult R&B Songs chart. The music video on YouTube has received over 35 million views as of May 2024.

== Charts ==
Chart performance for "Bad Habits"
Chart (2020–2021)	Peak position
UK Singles Downloads (Official Charts)	84
US Bubbling Under Hot 100 (Billboard)	17
US Hot R&B/Hip-Hop Songs (Billboard)	49

== Certifications ==
Certifications for "Bad Habits"
Region	Certification	Certified units/sales
United States (RIAA)	Gold	500,000^{‡}
^{‡} Sales+streaming figures based on certification alone.
