= Ocean (Lady Antebellum album) =

Studio album by Lady Antebellum
- Released: November 15, 2019
- Genre: Country pop
- Length: 47:38
- Label: BMLG Records
- Producer: Dann Huff

Lady Antebellum chronology
Heart Break (2017)	Ocean (2019)	What a Song Can Do (2021)

Singles from Ocean
- 1. "What If I Never Get Over You" Released: May 17, 2019; 2. "Ocean" Released: October 7, 2019; 3. "What I'm Leaving For" Released: February 18, 2020; 4. "Champagne Night" Released: April 13, 2020

Ocean is the eighth studio album by American country pop trio Lady Antebellum, and the final one released under that name before it was shortened to "Lady A". The album was released on November 15, 2019, through BMLG Records. This is their first album with the label, and first to be produced by Dann Huff. A deluxe edition of the album was released November 20, 2020, under their new name "Lady A".

== Background ==
In August 2018, Lady Antebellum signed with Nashville Harbor Records & Entertainment after their recording contract with Capitol Nashville ended. In March 2019, while performing in London, the trio announced that they were working on new music.

== Singles ==
"What If I Never Get Over You" was released on May 17, 2019, as the album's lead single. The song debuted at number 14 on the Hot Country Songs chart, and at number 25 on the Country Airplay chart. As of September 2019, it has sold 68,000 units in the United States. The song topped the Country Airplay chart in January 2020, becoming their first number one since 2014.

The title track was released on September 20, 2019 as a promotional single, and was sent to adult contemporary radio as the album's second single on October 7, 2019.

"What I'm Leaving For" was released as a promotional single on October 25, 2019 and was released to country radio on February 18, 2020 as the third official single. A ballad about leaving one's family to go to work, it was later pulled from radio in the wake of the COVID-19 pandemic.

"Pictures", "Boots", and "Be Patient with My Love" were also released as promotional singles ahead of the album.

== Commercial performance ==
Ocean debuted at number two on the US Top Country Albums earning 29,000 equivalent album units (including 21,000 copies as pure album sales) in its first week, according to Nielsen Music. The album also debuted at number 11 on the US Billboard 200 chart, becoming the group's first album to miss the top-ten. As of February 2020, the album has earned with 172,000 album-equivalent units in the US. As of March 2020, the album has sold 62,400 copies in the United States.

== Track listing ==
Adapted from Taste of Country and Lady Antebellum's Instagram.

No.	Title	Writer(s)	Length
1.	"What If I Never Get Over You"	Sam Ellis; Ryan Hurd; Laura Veltz; Jon Green	3:26
2.	"Pictures"	Dave Haywood; Charles Kelley; Hillary Scott; Sarah Buxton; Corey Crowder	2:58
3.	"Crazy Love"	Kelley; Nathan Chapman	3:25
4.	"You Can Do You"	Haywood; Kelley; Crowder; Jordan Schmidt	4:08
5.	"What I'm Leaving For"	Ellis; Veltz; Micah Premnath	3:23
6.	"Be Patient with My Love"	Kelley; Dave Barnes; Ben West	5:06
7.	"Alright"	Haywood; Kelley; Scott; busbee; Justin Ebach	3:16
8.	"Let It Be Love"	Scott; Jordan Reynolds; Amy Wadge	3:38
9.	"On a Night Like This"	Barnes	3:23
10.	"Boots"	Kelley; Ross Copperman	3:33
11.	"The Thing That Wrecks You" (featuring Little Big Town)	Daniel Tashian; Tenille Townes; Kate York	4:35
12.	"Mansion"	Chris DeStefano; Hillary Lindsey; Josh Miller	3:12
13.	"Ocean"	Buxton; Tofer Brown; Abe Stoklasa	3:30
Total length:			47:38

Ocean - Deluxe Edition
No.	Title	Writer(s)	Length
14.	"Heroes" (featuring Thomas Rhett)	Kelley; Rhett; Julian Bunetta; Sean Douglas; Jesse Frasure; Joe London	3:57
15.	"Champagne Night" (from Songland)	Scott; Kelley; Haywood; Madeline Merlo; Shane McAnally; Tina Parol; David Thomson; Patricia Conroy	3:05
16.	"Underwater"	Corey Sanders; Green; Veltz	3:17
17.	"Let It Be Love" (at Home version)	Scott; Reynolds; Wadge	3:41
18.	"Champagne Night" (Tiki Bar version)	Scott; Kelley; Haywood; Merlo; McAnally; Parol; Thomson; Conroy	3:05
19.	"What If I Never Get Over You" (Live from 3rd and Lindsley)	Ellis; Hurd; Veltz; Green	3:31
Total length:			68:14

== Personnel ==
Adapted from AllMusic

=== Lady Antebellum ===
- Dave Haywood – acoustic guitar, background vocals, banjo, creative director, keyboards, mandolin, resonator guitar, harmonica
- Charles Kelley – background vocals, creative director, lead vocals
- Hillary Scott – background vocals, creative director, lead vocals

=== Additional musicians ===
- David Angell – violin
- Monisa Angell – viola
- David Davidson – violin
- Stuart Duncan – fiddle
- Conni Ellisor – violin
- Karen Fairchild – featuring vocals (11)
- Paul Franklin – steel guitar
- Dann Huff – accordion, acoustic guitar, banjo, bass guitar, bouzouki, dobro, Fender Rhodes, resonator guitar, Hammond B3, keyboards, mandolin, percussion, piano, soloist, synthesizer, synthesizer piano, synthesizer strings
- Charlie Judge – Hammond B3, keyboards, lap steel guitar, piano, synthesizer piano, synthesizer strings
- Anthony La Marchina – cello
- Elizabeth Lamb – viola
- Gordon Mote – piano
- Carole Rabinowitz – cello
- Thomas Rhett – featuring vocals (14)
- Kimberly Schlapman – featuring vocals (11)
- Jimmie Lee Sloas – bass
- Aaron Sterling – drums, percussion
- Phillip Sweet – featuring vocals (11)
- Ilya Toshinskiy – acoustic guitar, banjo, dobro, resonator guitar, mandolin, soloist
- Derek Wells – electric guitar
- Jimi Westbrook – featuring vocals (11)
- Kris Wilkinson – string arrangement
- Kristin Wilkinson – viola
- Karen Winkleman – violin
- Alex Wright – Hammond B3, steel guitar, Wurlitzer

=== Production ===
- Adam Ayan – mixing
- Drew Bollman – engineer
- Nathan Chapman – programming
- Ross Copperman – programming
- Cory Crowder – programming
- Shawn Daugherty – assistant
- Josh Ditty – assistant
- Parker Foote – graphic design
- Mike "Frog" Griffith – production coordination
- Dann Huff – digital editing, producer, programming
- Charlie Judge – programming
- Seth Morton – engineer
- Abby Murdock – graphic design
- Joshua Sage Newman – graphic design
- Justin Niebank – mixing, programming
- Ryon Nishimori – graphic design
- Doug Rich – copy coordination
- Dove Shore – photography
- Chris Small – digital editing
- Janice Soled – copy coordination
- Ben West – programming
- Alex Wright – programming

== Charts ==
=== Weekly charts ===
Weekly chart performance for Ocean
Chart (2019)	Peak position
Australian Albums (ARIA)	7
Canadian Albums (Billboard)	17
Scottish Albums (Official Charts)	10
Swiss Albums (Schweizer Hitparade)	24
UK Albums (Official Charts)	29
UK Country Albums (Official Charts)	1
US Billboard 200	11
US Top Country Albums (Billboard)	2

=== Year-end charts ===
2020 year-end chart performance for Ocean
Chart (2020)	Position
US Top Album Sales (Billboard)	92
US Top Country Albums (Billboard)	48
