= Jack Newsome =

American singer, songwriter and record producer

- Born: April 17, 1996 (age 30)
- Origin: Rumson, New Jersey, the United States
- Genres: Pop; EDM
- Occupations: Singer; songwriter; record producer
- Years active: 2007–present
- Label: Smack Songs

Jack Newsome (born April 17, 1996) is an American singer, songwriter, and record producer. Newsome was a member of the band NY5, and subsequently the Berlin-based band New District, but ultimately chose to pursue his solo career and education at the Berklee College of Music. In 2016, he released the debut extended play, Medicine. He first gained recognition as a solo artist when he contributed the vocals for "Affection" by Said the Sky and Origami with five million views on YouTube. As a songwriter and producer, he has worked with a range of artists, including Meghan Trainor, Ryan Tedder, Grey, and Sean Kingston.

In June 2019, Newsome achieved national recognition when he appeared on the reality songwriting competition series, Songland, in which he performed "Lying (Next to You)". Following the appearance, he signed with Smack Songs as a singer-songwriter in November 2019.

== Early life ==
Jack Newsome was born April 17, 1996, in Rumson, New Jersey, the United States, to Doug and Kimberly. Newsome started playing music at the age of six, and independently released the song "The Holiday Call" in 2007. Since the release of the single "Fly" in 2010, he continuously released several materials, including the studio album, Songs from the Garage (2011).

== Career ==
=== 2012-2015: NY5 and New District ===
During junior year of high school, Newsome joined the Manhattan-based boy band, NY5, along with the four other members including Dylan Hartigan, who later competed on the fourteenth season of The Voice. The band released the debut single, "NYC Girls" in July 2013, but soon went inactive. After the disbandment of NY5, Newsome moved to Berlin, Germany to work with the boy band, New District, however decided to pursue his solo career and study at Berklee College of Music in Boston. Later, New District was nominated at the 2016 Teen Choice Awards for the Next Big Thing category.

=== 2016-present: Solo career ===
In February 2016, Newsome opened for Phillip Phillips at The Stone Pony along with A Great Big World and Matt Nathanson. Newsome independently released his debut extended play, Medicine in March 2016. The following single, "Bellevue" was well-received by several music media, including Kick Kick Snare and Girl's Life. In 2017, Newsome moved to Los Angeles and made money working as a session singer, while contributing the vocals for Said the Sky and Origami song, "Affection" (2018) and writing songs for the artists such as Plvtinum and Matt Sato.

In June 2019, Newsome appeared in the third episode of the songwriting competition series, Songland, where he wrote and performed "Lying (Next to You)", co-written by Ryan Tedder, Ester Dean, Elsa Curran, Christina Galligan, Andrew DeRoberts, and Shane McAnally, who also produced the song. Although the song was not chosen by the guest artist, Kelsea Ballerini, the appearance earned him national recognition and led him to write Meghan Trainor song, "Hurt Me". "Lying (Next to You)" has been streamed more than a million times on Spotify as of September 2020. Following the appearance, Newsome signed with the label, Smack Songs as a singer-songwriter. His first single from the label, "All My Friends Are Falling in Love" was released in February 2020. The song was used in the American reality television series, Love Island in September 2020.

== Discography ==
=== Albums ===
==== Studio albums ====
Title	Details
Songs from the Garage	Released: November 1, 2011; Label: Self-released; Format: digital download, streaming

=== Extended plays ===
Title	Details
Medicine	Released: March 29, 2016; Label: Self-released; Format: digital download, streaming
Prologue	Released: May 8, 2020; Label: Smack Productions; Format: digital download, streaming
All Dressed Up	Released: June 4, 2020; Label: Self-released; Format: digital download, streaming

==== Singles ====
===== As a lead artist =====
Title	Year	Album
"NYC Girls" (as a member of NY5)	2013	Non-album singles
"Lying (Next to You)" (from Songland)	2019	Non-album singles
"Best I Can"	2019	Prologue
"Not Going Out Tonight"	2019	Prologue
"All My Friends Are Falling in Love"	2020	Prologue
"Died in Your Arms"	2020	Prologue
"Give It Back"	2020	Prologue
"I Remember" (with Inverness)	2020	TBA
"The Year the World Stood Still"	2021	All Dressed Up
"Arms"	2021	All Dressed Up
"Friends"	2021	All Dressed Up
"Sorry for Your Loss"	2021	TBA
"F it ILY" (with Chymes)	2021	TBA

===== As a featured artist =====
Title	Year	Album
"How Much" (Branch & Broo featuring Jack Newsome)	2019	TBA
"Home Alright" (Terry Zhong featuring Jack Newsome)	2020	After Hours

===== Promotional singles =====
Title	Year	Album
"The Holiday Call"	2007	Non-album singles
"Fly"	2010	Songs from the Garage
"Control Freak" (featuring Jessica Eckhoff)	2010	Non-album singles
"Dancer"	2010	Songs from the Garage
"Spring Soaring"	2011	Non-album singles
"Transformation"	2011	Songs from the Garage
"You"	2012	Non-album singles
"Bellevue"	2016	Non-album singles
"Easy on Me"	2020	TBA
"Boomerang"	2020	TBA
"My Forever" (featuring Ashley Sorrell)	2020	TBA

=== Other appearances ===
Title	Year	Album
"Affection" (Said the Sky and Origami featuring Jack Newsome)	2018	Wide-Eyed
"Holdin’ My Own" (Said the Sky featuring Jack Newsome)	2022	Sentiment

=== Music videos ===
List of music videos and showing year released
Title	Year	Ref.
"NYC Girls" (as a member of NY5)	2013	
"Medicine"	2016	
"Tension" (Cameo appearance) (Pretty Sister featuring White Gold)	2018	
"Died in Your Arms"	2020	
"Arms"	2021	

== Songwriting and production credits ==
indicates a song that was released as a single.

Title	Year	Artist(s)	Album	Credits
"Do You Say My Name"	2018	Matt Sato	Non-album singles	Writer
"Better Off"	2019	Plvtinum	Non-album singles	Writer
"Okay"	2019	Peter Fenn	Non-album singles	Writer
"Hurt Me"	2019	Meghan Trainor	Non-album singles	Writer
"Look at What We've Done"	2019	Peter Thomas	Attachment	Backing vocals
"High of U"	2019	Darius Coleman	TBA	Writer, producer
"Table for 2"	2019	Alok and Iro	Non-album singles	Vocal producer
"Stay Here"	2019	Alex Sampson	TBA	Writer, producer
"Is It Love?"	2020	Jordy	Psycho	Writer
"Carry On"	2020	Gabriel Kane	Non-album singles	Writer
"U Remind Me"	2020	Zolita	Non-album singles	Producer
"Cold Shoulder"	2020	Alex Sampson	TBA	Writer, producer
"Could've, Should've, Would've"	2020	Brigetta	TBA	Writer, producer
"Never Been in Love"	2020	Gatlin	Sugarcoated	Writer
"Paper House"	2020	Grant Knoche	Color Me Blue	Writer
"For the Night"	2020	Grey	TBA	Writer
"18"	2020	Grant Knoche	Color Me Blue	Writer
"Loveline"	2020	Zolita	Evil Angel	Producer
"Squeeze"	2020	Indiana Massara	TBA	Writer, producer
"State of Wonder" (featuring Anthony Russo and Kang Daniel)	2021	Inverness	Monstercat Instinct, Vol. 7	Writer
"Not Your Girl"	2021	Tiera	Tiera	Writer
"The Intro"	2021	Grant Knoche	TBA	Writer

== Filmography ==
Television
Year	Title	Role	Notes
2019	Songland	Contestant	Episode 3, Season 1

== Awards and nominations ==
Year	Organization	Work	Category	Result	Ref.
2015	International Acoustic Music Awards	"Hooked on Me"	Best Male Country Song	Won	
2015	International Acoustic Music Awards	Himself	Grand Prize	Won	
2019	Songland	"Lying (Next to You)"	Episode 3, Season 1	Top 3	
