= List of songs written and produced by Ester Dean =

This is a list of songs co-written and produced by American singer, songwriter, and producer Ester Dean.

Year	Artist	Song	Album	Producer	References
2006	Bayje (aka Kat Doray)	"The Greatest Gift"	—N/a		
2007	A Girl Called Jane	"He's Alive"	—N/a		
2007	Dear Jayne	"Talkin' Bout Himself"	Voice Message		
2007	Mýa	"Ridin'"	Liberation		
2008	Karina Pasian	"Go Back"	First Love		
2008	Keyshia Cole	"Make Me Over"	A Different Me		
2008	Girlicious	"Like Me"	Girlicious		
2008	Girlicious	"My Boo"	Girlicious		
2008	Girlicious	"It’s Mine"	Girlicious		
2008	Gucci Mane	"White Girl (I Think I Love Her)" (feat. Ester Dean)	—N/a		
2008	T.I.	"Remember Me" (feat. Mary J. Blige)	Paper Trail		
2008	Teyana Taylor	"Google Me"	From a Planet Called Harlem		
2009	Mary J. Blige	"The One" (feat. Drake)	Stronger with Each Tear		
2009	Mary J. Blige	"I Am"	Stronger with Each Tear		
2009	Mary J. Blige	"I Love U (Yes I Do)"	Stronger with Each Tear		
2009	Mary J. Blige	"Stay"	Stronger with Each Tear		
2009	Mary J. Blige	"Stronger"	Stronger with Each Tear / Music Inspired by More than a Game		
2009	Chris Brown	"So Cold"	Graffiti		
2009	Chris Brown	"Gotta Be Ur Man"	Graffiti		
2009	Chris Brown	"I Love U" (feat. Ester Dean)	Graffiti		
2009	Bayje	"20 Miles To Graceland"	—N/a		
2009	Bayje	"Missin' You Gone"	—N/a		
2009	Bayje	"Preach"	—N/a		
2009	Bayje	"Still In Love"	—N/a		
2009	Ciara	"Never Ever" (feat. Young Jeezy)	Fantasy Ride		
2009	Esmée Denters	"Outta Here"	Outta Here		
2009	Flo Rida	"Jump" (feat. Nelly Furtado)	R.O.O.T.S.		
2009	Keri Hilson	"Change Me" (feat. Akon)	In a Perfect World...		
2009	Keri Hilson	"Make Love"	In a Perfect World...		
2009	Paradiso Girls	"Patron Tequila" (feat. Lil Jon and Eve)	Crazy Horse		
2009	Rihanna	"Rude Boy"	Rated R		
2009	Juelz Santana	"Back to the Crib" (feat. Chris Brown)	Born to Lose, Built to Win		
2009	The Pussycat Dolls	"Jai Ho! (You Are My Destiny)" (with A. R. Rahman feat. Nicole Scherzinger)	Doll Domination		
2009	The Pussycat Dolls	"Whatcha Think About That" (feat. Missy Elliott)	Doll Domination		
2009	The Pussycat Dolls	"Bad Girl"	Confessions of a Shopaholic		
2009	Trey Songz	"Takes Time to Love"	Confessions of a Shopaholic		
2009	K. Michelle	"Fakin' It" (feat. Missy Elliott)	Pain Medicine		
2009	Robin Thicke	"Sex Therapy"	Sex Therapy: The Session		
2009	Robin Thicke	"Shakin' It 4 Daddy" (feat. Nicki Minaj)	Sex Therapy: The Session		
2010	Christina Aguilera	"Not Myself Tonight"	Bionic		
2010	Christina Aguilera	"Woohoo" (feat. Nicki Minaj)	Bionic		
2010	Christina Aguilera	"I Hate Boys"	Bionic		
2010	Christina Aguilera	"Vanity"	Bionic	Yes	
2010	Christina Aguilera	"The Beautiful People"	Burlesque: Original Motion Picture Soundtrack		
2010	Chris Brown	"Invented Head"	In My Zone (Rhythm & Streets)	Yes	
2010	Ciara	"Turn It Up" (feat. Usher)	Basic Instinct		
2010	Dr. Dre	"Under Pressure" (feat. Jay-Z)	—N/a		
2010	Flo Rida	"21" (feat. Laza Morgan)	Only One Flo (Part 1)	Yes	
2010	Keri Hilson	"Toy Soldier"	No Boys Allowed		
2010	Keri Hilson	"Lose Control / Let Me Down" (feat. Nelly)	No Boys Allowed		
2010	Sean Kingston	"Letting Go (Dutty Love)" (feat. Nicki Minaj)	Back 2 Life		
2010	Ludacris	"I Know You Got a Man" (feat. Flo Rida and Ester Dean)	Battle of the Sexes		
2010	Nicki Minaj	"Super Bass"	Pink Friday		
2010	Monica	"Here I Am"	Still Standing		
2010	Monica	"Nothing Like" (feat. Ester Dean)	—N/a		
2010	Nelly	"Long Gone" (feat. Chris Brown and Plies)	5.0		
2010	Katy Perry	"Firework"	Teenage Dream		
2010	Katy Perry	"Peacock"	Teenage Dream		
2010	Rihanna	"What's My Name?" (feat. Drake)	Loud		
2010	Rihanna	"S&M"	Loud		
2010	Rihanna	"Complicated"	Loud	Yes	
2010	Kelly Rowland	"Rose Colored Glasses"	Here I Am		
2010	Kelly Rowland	"Lay It on Me" (feat. Big Sean)	Here I Am		
2010	Kelly Rowland	"I'm Dat Chick"	Here I Am		
2010	Jesse McCartney	"Up" (feat. Dapo)	Step Up 3D		
2010	Trey Songz	"Already Taken"	Step Up 3D		
2010	Soulja Boy	"Grammy" (feat. Ester Dean)	The DeAndre Way		
2010	Sophia Fresh	"Change My Number"	So Phreakin' Fresh		
2010	Tinie Tempah	"Love Suicide" (feat. Ester Dean)	Disc-Overy		
2010	Usher	"Love 'Em All"	Raymond v. Raymond		
2010	Usher	"Guilty" (feat. T.I.)	Raymond v. Raymond		
2010	Usher	"Get In My Car" (feat. Bun B)	Raymond v. Raymond		
2010	Usher	"Lil Freak" (feat. Nicki Minaj)	Raymond v. Raymond		
2010	Usher	"Hot Tottie" (feat. Jay-Z)	Versus		
2011	Beyoncé	"Start Over"	4		
2011	Beyoncé	"Countdown"	4		
2011	Bridget Kelly	"My Heart"	—N/a		
2011	Kelly Clarkson	"Mr. Know It All"	Stronger	Yes	
2011	David Guetta	"Turn Me On" (feat. Nicki Minaj)	Nothing but the Beat / Pink Friday: Roman Reloaded		
2011	Mary J. Blige	"This Love Is for You"	My Life II... The Journey Continues (Act 1)		
2011	Mary J. Blige	"One Life"	My Life II... The Journey Continues (Act 1)		
2011	Mary J. Blige	"Queen"	—N/a		
2011	Mary J. Blige	"Break Up To Make Up"	—N/a		
2011	Mary J. Blige	"Hero"	—N/a		
2011	Ginuwine	"First Time" (Piano Mix)	Elgin	Yes	
2011	Girlicious	"Set It Off"	—N/a		
2011	Neon Hitch	"Bad Dog"	—N/a		
2011	Jennifer Hudson	"Gone"	I Remember Me		
2011	Jennifer Hudson	"Stay"	I Remember Me		
2011	Lloyd	"Lay It Down"	King of Hearts		
2011	Scotty McCreery	"I Love You This Big"	Clear as Day		
2011	Rihanna	"You da One"	Talk That Talk		
2011	Rihanna	"Where Have You Been"	Talk That Talk		
2011	Rihanna	"Talk That Talk" (feat. Jay-Z)	Talk That Talk		
2011	Rihanna	"We All Want Love"	Talk That Talk		
2011	Rihanna	"Drunk on Love"	Talk That Talk		
2011	Rihanna	"Roc Me Out"	Talk That Talk		
2011	Rihanna	"Farewell"	Talk That Talk		
2011	Rihanna	"Fool in Love"	Talk That Talk	Yes	
2011	Nicole Scherzinger	"Right There"	Killer Love		
2011	Nicole Scherzinger	"Wet"	Killer Love		
2011	Britney Spears	"(Drop Dead) Beautiful" (feat. Sabi)	Femme Fatale		
2011	Britney Spears	"Selfish"	Femme Fatale		
2011	Britney Spears	"I Need A Change"	—N/a		
2011	Sabi	"Wild Heart"	All I Want		
2011	Pia Toscano	"This Time"	—N/a	Yes	
2011	Young Jeezy	"Momma Told Me"	Mixtape Monster 103 Edition	Yes	
2012	50 Cent	"Hard Rock" (feat. Ester Dean)	The 50th Law of Power		
2012	Keke Palmer	"We Are" (feat. Ray Romano, John Leguizamo, Denis Leary, Queen Latifah, Jennifer Lopez, Nicki Minaj, Drake, Heather Morris and Ester Dean)	Ice Age: Continental Drift	Yes	
2012	MGK	"Invincible" (feat. Ester Dean)	Lace Up		
2012	Destinee & Paris	"Sweet Sara"	—N/a		
2012	Destinee & Paris	"Pretend"	—N/a		
2012	Rita Ora	"Love and War" (feat. J. Cole)	Ora		
2012	Rita Ora	"Fair"	—N/a		
2012	Sean Paul	"How Deep Is Your Love" (feat. Kelly Rowland)	Tomahawk Technique		
2012	Keyshia Cole	"Forever" (feat. T.I.)	Woman to Woman		
2012	Nicki Minaj	"Right by My Side" (feat. Chris Brown)	Pink Friday: Roman Reloaded		
2012	Nicki Minaj	"Beautiful Sinner"	Pink Friday: Roman Reloaded		
2012	Priyanka Chopra	"In My City" (feat. will.i.am)	—N/a		
2012	Rihanna	"Lost in Paradise"	Unapologetic		
2012	Rihanna	"Right Now"	Unapologetic		
2012	Sophia Fresh	"Love (What Did I Do)"	—N/a		
2012	RichGirl	"Can't Shake"	—N/a		
2012	Little Mix	"Always Be Together"	DNA		
2013	B.o.B	"Wide Open" (feat. Ester Dean)	Underground Luxury		
2013	Cassie	"Bad Bitches" (feat. Ester Dean)	RockaByeBaby		
2013	Selena Gomez	"Come & Get It"	Stars Dance		
2013	Jessica Sanchez	"Right To Fall"	Me, You & the Music		
2013	Loreen	"We Got the Power"	Heal (2013 version)		
2013	Mindless Behavior	"I'm Falling"	All Around the World		
2013	Pitbull	"That High" (feat. Kelly Rowland)	Meltdown		
2014	G.R.L.	"Ugly Heart"	G.R.L.		
2014	Karmin	"I Want It All"	Pulses		
2014	David Guetta	"Hey Mama" (feat. Nicki Minaj, Bebe Rexha & Afrojack)	Listen		
2014	David Guetta	"No Money No Love" (with Showtek feat. Elliphant and Ms. Dynamite)	Listen		
2014	Nicki Minaj	"Pills N Potions"	The Pinkprint		
2014	Nicki Minaj	"All Things Go"	The Pinkprint		
2014	Nicki Minaj	"The Night Is Still Young"	The Pinkprint		
2014	Nicki Minaj	"Grand Piano"	The Pinkprint		
2014	Nicki Minaj	"I Lied"	The Pinkprint		
2015	Kevin McHale	"Realize"	Gemini		
2015	Florence + the Machine	"Long & Lost"	How Big, How Blue, How Beautiful		
2015	Rihanna	"Dancing in the Dark"	Home: Original Motion Picture Soundtrack		
2015	Becky G	"Lovin' So Hard"	—N/a		
2015	Ciara	"That’s How I’m Feelin'" (feat. Pitbull & Missy Elliott)	Jackie		
2018	Afrojack (feat. Jewelz & Sparks)	"When You're Gone"	Press play	Yes	
2019	Ciara	"Thinkin Bout You "	Beauty Marks		
2019	Jonas Brothers (by Able Heart)	"Greenlight"			
2019	Leona Lewis, Cali y El Dandee and Juan Magán	"Solo Quiero (Somebody to Love)"	—N/a		
2020	City Girls	"That Old Man"	City On Lock		
