= California (Usher song) =

2020 single by Usher

Single by Usher featuring Tyga
- Released: June 15, 2020
- Recorded: 2020
- Genre: Pop
- Length: 3:48
- Label: Brand Usher; RCA
- Songwriter(s): Usher Raymond; Ester Dean; Ryan Tedder; Shane McAnally; Michael Stevenson; Melvin Hough II; Rivelino Raoul Wouter; Ryan Cambetes; Kaj Nelson Blokhuis; Michael Wise
- Producer(s): Mel & Mus; Bill Zimmerman (misc.)

Usher singles chronology
"SexBeat" (2020)	"California" (2020)	"I Cry" (2020)

Tyga singles chronology
"Contact" (2020)	"California" (2020)

Songland singles chronology
"Champagne Night" (2020)	"California" (2020)

Music video
- "California" on YouTube

"California" is a song by American recording artist Usher. It features American rapper Tyga. It was released on June 15, 2020, following Usher's appearance on an episode of the television series Songland. The song was written by Usher, Tyga, Ester Dean, Ryan Tedder, Shane McAnally, Ryan Cambetes, Melvin Hough Ii, Rivelino Raoul Wouter, Kaj Nelson Blokhuis, and Michael Wise.

== Background ==
Usher appeared on the season finale of the second season of American songwriting competition series, Songland, which aired June 15, 2020.

== Music video ==
The music video was released on June 18, 2020.

== Release history ==
Region	Date	Format	Label
United States	June 15, 2020	Digital download; streaming	Brand Usher; RCA

== Charts ==
Chart (2020)	Peak position
South Africa (Radio Monitor)	72
