= Everything I Did to Get to You =

2020 single by Ben Platt

Single by Ben Platt
- Released: June 8, 2020
- Genre: Pop
- Length: 3:07
- Label: Atlantic
- Songwriters: Michael Pollack; Esther Dean; Shane McAnally; David Davis; Charlie Bryce Wallace; Robert Cutarella; Carla Carter; Keith Cullen; Devin Kennedy
- Producer: Ryan Tedder

Ben Platt singles chronology
"So Will I" (2020)	"Everything I Did to Get to You" (2020)	"Imagine" (2021)

Songland singles chronology
"Miracle" (2020)	"Everything I Did to Get to You" (2020)	"California" (2020)

Audio
- "Everything I Did to Get to You" on YouTube

"Everything I Did to Get to You" is a song by actor/singer-songwriter Ben Platt. It was released on June 8, 2020, following Platt's appearance on an episode of the television series Songland. It is a re-worked version of the song "Everything It Took to Get to You" by David Davis, Charlie Bryce Wallace, Robert Cutarella, Carla Carter, Keith Cullen, Devin Kennedy with additional writing from Michael Pollack, Esther Dean and Shane McAnally.

== Background ==
According to Davis, the song was inspired by his own personal struggles with his sexuality and he described it as a "realization about how everything it took and everything I did to get to this place of owning my story was totally worth it." On the ninth episode of the second season of Songland, Davis worked with producer Ryan Tedder to fine-tune the song to fit Platt's style, which included changing the title from "Everything It Took to Get to You" to its final one and tweaking the lyrics to make them "communicate pain and trial". This finished song was selected as the winner by Platt, who released the single on June 8, 2020 after the episode aired.

== Release history ==
Region	Date	Format	Label
United States	June 15, 2020	Digital download; streaming	Atlantic

== Charts ==
Chart (2020)	Peak position
Billboard (Digital Song Sales)	34
