= Be Nice =

2019 single by Black Eyed Peas

Single by Black Eyed Peas featuring Snoop Dogg
- Released: June 4, 2019
- Recorded: be nic3
- Studio: be nice
- Venue: be nic3
- Genre: Pop rap
- Length: 3:48
- Label: EOne Music; iamMedia
- Songwriters: Snoop Dogg; Ester Dean; Ryan Tedder; Shane McAnally; Anish Sood; Adam Friedman; Martijn Konijnenburg; Ryan Merchant; will.i.am
- Producer: will.i.am

Black Eyed Peas singles chronology
"Dopeness" (2018)	"Be Nice" (2019)	"Mami" (2019)

Snoop Dogg singles chronology
"Hallelujah" (2019)	"Be Nice" (2019)	"I Wanna Thank Me" (2019)

Songland singles chronology
"Be Nice" (2019)	"Solo Quiero (Somebody to Love)" (2019)

Music video
- "Be Nice" on YouTube

"Be Nice" is a song by hip-hop group Black Eyed Peas featuring Snoop Dogg. It marked the first collaboration between the two. Lyrically, the song is about coming together, no matter what our differences might be. The song is derived from Songland.
