= Able Heart =

American singer, songwriter and former snowboarder

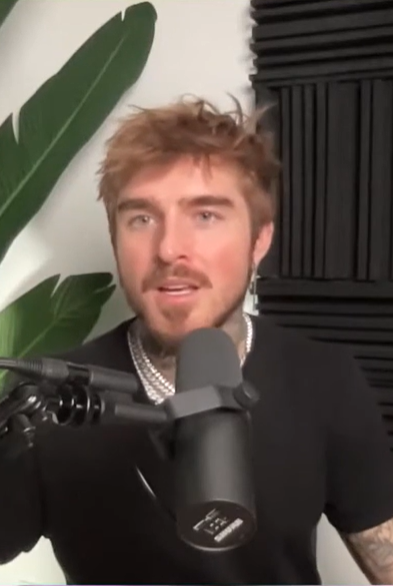
- Heart in 2023

Background information
- Born: July 14, 1991 (age 35)
- Origin: Hershey, Pennsylvania
- Genres: Rap rock
- Occupations: Singer, songwriter

Able Heart, real name John Paciolla (born July 14, 1991) is an American singer, songwriter, producer, and former snowboarder. He is best known for his manifestation-focused music. He is also known for his appearance on Songland, where his song was selected by the Jonas Brothers.

== Biography ==
He was born on July 14, 1991 in Hershey, Pennsylvania to a father who was a musician and producer. He started snowboarding and skating from a young age, and was considered a prospect for the Olympics in halfpipe. However, a fall at 15 resulted in an injury to his spine, ending this goal.

He subsequently struggled with drug addiction through his teens and early 20s, before becoming interested in music. At a treatment center in Palm Springs, he learned about EDM music, which he described as a "spiritual experience" when hearing it in New York soon after.

He subsequently went into becoming a songwriter and singer, and, after a relapse, moved to Los Angeles. He then began creating darker songs on SoundCloud under the name Able Heart, after the phrase "able to do anything your heart desires", and caught the attention of producers at Songland. His most well-known song during this period was 2018's "Let Me Drown". He also worked as a ghostwriter.

He participated in Songland's fourth episode. He selected a brighter song than his previous work, "Greenlight", described as a "rock-rap song with a twist" by Ester Dean, and has stated that he frequently cried with joy during the recording. His participation was his first live performance.

The song won the episode and was recorded by the Jonas Brothers. It was ranked No. 1 on the iTunes Top Songs Chart and reached #8 on the Bubbling Under Hot 100. He was encouraged to stop ghostwriting following that. Dean went on to describe his appearance as her highlight from Season 1. He subsequently worked with former Songland guest will.i.am.

He has subsequently become known for his manifestation-focused music, with fans ranging from the Jonas Brothers to Oprah Winfrey. This music utilizes frequencies that some believe enhance concentration and mood. He also frequently performs virtual concerts.

== Discography ==
=== Singles ===
- "Thank Me" (with Qveen Herby) (2026)
- "Perfect Timing" (with Qveen Herby) (2026)
- "Magnet (639HZ)" (2025)
- "On The Move (183HZ)" (2024)
- "Peace (432HZ)" (2023)
- "Vibe (639HZ)" (2023)
- "Shine (932Hz)" (2023)
- "Watermelon (540Hz)" (2023)
- "Money (888Hz)" (2023)
- "Live It Up" (2023)
- "Masterpiece" (2023)
- "I Promise" (with Gavin Magnus) (2023)
- "If I Died Tomorrow" (with Krysta Youngs) (2023)
- "Drugs" (2023)
- "Burning" (2023)
