= Remmi =

American musician

REMMI
- Born: Rachel Elizabeth Smith; Alexandria, Louisiana
- Years active: 2007–present
- Website: remmimusic.com

Rachel Elizabeth Smith (born February 28, 1989), known professionally as REMMI, is an American indie pop, indietronica, electropop artist from Pollock, Louisiana. She previously played under the name Rach E. Smith.

== Early years ==
Rachel Elizabeth Smith was born in Alexandria, Louisiana on February 28, 1989.

Smith first began playing music when she found her mother's old acoustic guitar in a closet at age 11. At the time, she was living in Pollock, LA, a small rural town in Grant Parish. Her first taste of music came through church. She grew up singing for Southern Baptist audiences in children's choirs and musicals in Alexandria, LA. Smith eventually began writing her own songs and began playing in smaller venues and opening for friends.

Smith's family relocated from Pollock to Orlando, Florida her second year of high school. She attended Master's Academy in Oviedo, Florida. Here, she continued to play music in churches and hone her songwriting. After high school, Smith attended UCF and USF. She was eventually asked to open on tour for contemporary christian bands and began touring nationally with her original compositions. After college, she relocated to Nashville to pursue music professionally.

== Reception ==
REMMI has collaborated with artists such as R3hab, Kshmr, Maty Noyes, Black Coast, NVDES, Lucian.

REMMI was featured on a song by experimental indie pop project NVDES called "D.Y.T. (Do Your Thing)" in 2018. This song was featured in an Apple iPhone X commercial.

REMMI appeared in episode 4 of NBC's Songland, an American songwriting competition series produced in cooperation with Universal Television Alternative Studio, Live Animals Productions, Dave Stewart Entertainment, and 222 Productions. Remmi co-wrote a song, "Do You Think of Me?", with producer Ryan Tedder (known for penning hits such as "Bleeding Love", "Halo", and "Rumour Has It") that was pitched to the Jonas Brothers for their forthcoming record. The song made it into the top 3 selected on her episode.

== Discography ==
=== EPs ===
- New America (2015)
- Stick It on the Fridge (2020)

=== Singles ===
- "Star Spangled" (2015)
- "Awake, Asleep" (2015)
- "D.Y.T. (Do Your Thing)" with NVDES (2017)
- "Minimum Wage" (2018)
- "Desperate" (2018)
- "Behind It" (2018)
- "Believe in Yourself" (2019)
- "Angström" (2019)
- "Bump It" (2019)
- “Do You Think of Me? (from Songland)” (2019)
- “Xmas” (2019)
- “It’s The End of The World as We Know It” (2020)
- “Champagne Supernova” (2020)
- “Music Is All We Have” (2020)
- “Swimming in the Chaos” (2022)
- "My Dream Life" (2022)
- "Caffeine" with Tigerlily (2023)

=== Features ===
- "Gold Chain" and "Feel Something" with Black Coast (2015, 2017)
- "Innocence" and "Never Gets Old" with Super Duper (2015, 2017)
- "Bobby K" and "Forever" with Lucian (2015, 2016)
- "Take Me Apart" with LZRD, Spirix (2016)
- "Something on Fire" with Hollow Hum (Sep 2016)
- "Stay Alive" with Hidden Citizens (2017)
- “D.Y.T. (Do Your Thing)” with NVDES (2018)
- ”Lovers” with Lokii (2018)
- “Goodbye Bad Vibes” with NVDES (2021)
- ”Like This - REMMI remix” with Becca Mancari (2021)
