= Champagne Night =

Single by Lady Antebellum

from the album Ocean (Deluxe Edition)
- Released: April 13, 2020
- Genre: Country
- Length: 3:05
- Label: Big Machine
- Songwriter(s): Madeline Merlo; Shane McAnally; Hillary Scott; Charles Kelley; Dave Haywood; Tina Parol; David Thomson; Patricia Conroy; Ryan Tedder; Esther Dean; Andrew DeRoberts
- Producer(s): Andrew DeRoberts; Shane McAnally

Lady Antebellum singles chronology
"What I'm Leaving For" (2020)	"Champagne Night" (2020)	"Who You Are to Me" (2020)

Songland singles chronology
"Solo Quiero (Somebody to Love)" (2019)	"Champagne Night" (2020)	"Everything I Did to Get to You" (2020)

Music video
- "Champagne Night" on YouTube

"Champagne Night" is a song recorded by American country music trio Lady A (then known as Lady Antebellum). It was released on April 13, 2020, following the group's appearance on an episode of the television series Songland. "Champagne Night" is a re-worked version of the song "I'll Drink to That" by Madeline Merlo, with additional writing from the group members and its producer, Shane McAnally. This is the final single released under the name Lady Antebellum, before the band changed to Lady A, in June 2020. "Champagne Night" was included on the digital only deluxe edition re-issue of the trio's eighth studio album, Ocean.

== Background ==
Lady A appeared on the first episode of the second season of American songwriting competition series, Songland, which aired April 13, 2020. Canadian singer-songwriter Madeline Merlo presented the episode's winning song, "I'll Drink to That", which she co-wrote with Tina Parol, David Thomson, Patricia Conroy. After opting to record the song, the members of Lady A made adjustments to the lyrics with its producer, Shane McAnally, and the title was changed to "Champagne Night". Following its digital release alongside the airing of the episode, the song hit number one on the American iTunes all-genre sales chart and remained in the top ten the following week. On April 20, 2020, the group released the song to country radio. This made "Champagne Night" the first winning song from Songland to be promoted as an official radio single.

== Accolades ==
Year	Association	Category	Result	Ref.
2021	Canadian Country Music Association	Songwriter of the Year	Won	

== Live performances ==
On May 11, 2020, Lady A performed "Champagne Night" for the first time on the at home edition of The Tonight Show Starring Jimmy Fallon. Another at-home performance of the song was broadcast during the Season 18 finale of The Voice on May 19, 2020. On June 3, they played the song in a television special CMT Celebrates Our Heroes: An Artists of the Year.

== Charts ==
=== Weekly charts ===
Chart (2020–2021)	Peak position
Canada (Canadian Hot 100)	67
Canada Country (Billboard)	1
US Billboard Hot 100	33
US Country Airplay (Billboard)	1
US Hot Country Songs (Billboard)	7

=== Year-end charts ===
Chart (2020)	Position
US Country Airplay (Billboard)	59
US Hot Country Songs (Billboard)	54

Chart (2021)	Position
US Country Airplay (Billboard)	57
US Hot Country Songs (Billboard)	76

== Certifications ==
Region	Certification	Certified units/sales
Canada (Music Canada)	Gold	40,000^{‡}
United States (RIAA)	Platinum	1,000,000^{‡}
^{‡} Sales+streaming figures based on certification alone.

== Release history ==
Region	Date	Format	Label	Ref.
United States	April 13, 2020	Digital download	Big Machine	
United States	April 27, 2020	Country radio	Big Machine	
