= Shadow (Macklemore song) =

2019 song by Macklemore

Single by Macklemore featuring Iro
- Released: August 14, 2019
- Recorded: 2019
- Genre: Hip hop; Celtic
- Length: 2:58
- Label: Bendo
- Songwriters: Iro; Ben Haggerty
- Producer: Shane McAnally

Macklemore singles chronology
"Summer Days" (2019)	"Shadow" (2019)	"It's Christmas Time" (2019)

Iro singles chronology
"Love Is a Temple" (2018)	"Shadow" (2019)	"Table for 2" (2019)

Audio video
- "Shadow" on YouTube

"Shadow" is a song by American rapper Macklemore featuring Iro, based on a composition originally written and performed by the songwriter Iro on the NBC songwriting competition series Songland. Macklemore selected the song as the winning entry on the August 14, 2019, episode of Songland, on which he served as guest artist.

== Background ==
Iro, a busker originally from Tel Aviv who had been living in Brooklyn for a decade at the time of the episode's filming, appeared on Songland alongside songwriters Pop Culture, Chris Jobe, and Casey Cook, competing to have their song recorded by Macklemore. Iro described "Shadow" as being about "being trapped inside your fears," with the "shadow" of the title representing a person's ego, which he said "is always following you."

According to Billboard's Robbie Daw, the episode also featured Chris Jobe's song "It Could've Been You," which dealt with gun violence; the episode aired with a network disclaimer noting it had been filmed before the mass shootings in El Paso, Texas and Dayton, Ohio earlier that month. Macklemore ultimately declined to select Jobe's song, saying he felt it addressed "a subject matter that's really delicate."

== Composition ==
On the episode, Macklemore said he initially connected with "Shadow" but noted that he writes his own verses for his songs, meaning Iro's original lyrics would not be used in Macklemore's version. The song was reworked in the studio by Songland panelist Shane McAnally, who, according to Billboard, "seized on the Irish influence" in Iro's original composition and "decided to amp it up tenfold," adding fiddles, strings, stomps, and claps to give the track "an ambiance of full Celtic drama."

== Release ==
Macklemore selected "Shadow" as the winning song from the episode, telling Iro he had "channeled something on 'Shadow' that fit me" and that he wanted Iro to feature on the recorded version. The song was released to streaming platforms including Spotify and Apple Music. On April 5, 2019, twelve days after the episode was filmed, Macklemore flew Iro to São Paulo, Brazil, where the two performed "Shadow" together live for the first time at the Lollapalooza festival.

== Commercial performance ==
"Shadow" reached number one on the iTunes Hip-Hop/Rap chart on August 15, 2019, becoming the second single from Songland's first season, after John Legend's "We Need Love," to top an iTunes genre chart. TheWrap's Margeaux Sippell described "Shadow" as the last Songland-derived single to reach number one on an iTunes chart before Leona Lewis's "Solo Quiero (Somebody to Love)" achieved the same feat on the iTunes Latino chart later that month.

== Charts ==
Chart performance for "Shadow"
Chart (2019)	Peak position
Australia (ARIA Digital Track Chart)	35
Switzerland (Schweizer Hitparade)	74
New Zealand (Recorded Music NZ)	21
US Digital Song Sales (Billboard)	23

== Credits and personnel ==
- Iro – songwriting
- Ben Haggerty – vocals, songwriting
- Shane McAnally – production
