= I Cry (Usher song) =

2020 single by Usher

Single by Usher
- Released: June 26, 2020
- Recorded: 2020
- Genre: Pop soul
- Length: 3:39
- Label: Brand Usher; RCA
- Songwriters: Usher Raymond IV; Nasri Atweh; Jeff Gitelman
- Producers: Nasri; Jeff "Gitty" Gitelman

Usher singles chronology
"California" (2020)	"I Cry" (2020)	"Bad Habits" (2020)

Music video
- "I Cry" on YouTube

"I Cry" is a song by American singer-songwriter Usher. It was released as a standalone single on June 26, 2020 by Brand Usher and RCA Records. Originally a demo, the murder of George Floyd inspired Usher to finish recording the song. Usher, a father to two sons, wanted to show men they could be emotional, especially during difficult times. Usher's proceeds from the record will be donated to The Local Initiatives Support Corporation (LISC), which will help black-owned small businesses and black-led community organizations.

== Background and release ==
Usher began using his platform to speak out on social justices in 2016 with his record "Chains" featuring Nas and Bibi Bourelly. The song and video addressed racial injustices and police brutality using interactive media.

Following the murder of George Floyd, Usher and fellow R&B singer Trey Songz joined a Black Lives Matter protest in Los Angeles, California. On June 26, 2020, Usher shared a statement with the song release on his twitter and instagram platforms encouraging men to show their emotions, especially after the murder of George Floyd. He stated, "This song was inspired by wanting to teach my sons that it is ok for a man to feel emotions deeply and to cry. Like many men, I was raised to believe that we have to be 'tough' and not show our vulnerability, which I don't want to teach them". He continued: "While I was shut in during the [COVID-19] pandemic and watching the death of George Floyd, the ongoing slaughter of black men and women, the protests and the events that unfolded, I became very connected to the wider universal feeling of hopelessness".

The music video on YouTube has received over 10 million views as of May 2024.

== Composition ==
"I Cry" has a length of three minutes and thirty-nine seconds. The song has been characterized by critics as a mid-tempo piano ballad pop soul track.

== Live performances ==
On June 27, 2020, Usher performed "I Cry" at the Global Goal: Unite for Our Future.

== Credits and personnel ==
Credits adapted from Tidal.

- Usher – lead artist, vocals, songwriting
- Jeff Gitelman – producer, songwriting, engineer
- Nasri Atweh – production, songwriting, composer
- Jeremie Inhaber – songwriting, assistant engineer
- Ashley Jacobson – assistant engineer
- Chris Galland – assistant engineer
- Robin Florent – assistant engineer
- Ben "Bengineer" Chang – engineer, vocal producer
- Emerson Mancini - mixing engineer
- Manny Marroquinerías - mixing engineer

== Release history ==
Region	Date	Format	Label
United States	June 26, 2020	Digital download; streaming	Brand Usher; RCA
