= Too Much (Marshmello and Imanbek song) =

2020 single by Marshmello and Imanbek featuring Usher

Single by Marshmello and Imanbek featuring Usher
- Released: October 23, 2020
- Genre: EDM; slap house; pop
- Length: 2:45
- Label: Joytime Collective
- Songwriters: Diederik Van Elsas; Imanbek Zeikenov; Khamari Barnes; Marshmello; Nate Cyphert; Parrish Warrington
- Producers: Marshmello; Imanbek

Marshmello singles chronology
"OK Not to Be OK" (2020)	"Too Much" (2020)	"You" (2021)

Imanbek singles chronology
"Blackout" (2020)	"Too Much" (2020)	"Kill Me Better" (2020)

Usher singles chronology
"Bad Habits" (2020)	"Too Much" (2020)	"Good Love" (2022)

Music video
- "Too Much" on YouTube

"Too Much" is a song by American record producer and DJ Marshmello and Kazakh record producer Imanbek featuring American singer Usher. It was released on October 23, 2020, via Joytime Collective.

== Content ==
The song was written by Marshmello, Imanbek, Khamari Barnes, Nate Cyphert, Vaughn Elsas and Parrish Warrington. According to a press release, "Too Much" is a "high energy" song about "being there for the one you love".

The song is written in the key of F major, with a tempo of 126 beats per minute.

== Music video ==
An accompanying music video was released on October 24, 2020, and directed by Christian Breslauer, who also produced videos for Tiësto, Roddy Ricch, Jason Derulo. The video shows "a virtual-meets-reality world built around the production". In the video, Usher wears VR glasses, and helps "a kidnapped girl from Imanbeck by Marshmello who is remote-controlled by Usher."

== Track listing ==
Digital download and streaming
No.	Title	Length
1.	"Too Much"	2:45

Digital download and streaming – Alle Farben remix
No.	Title	Length
1.	"Too Much" (Alle Farben remix)	2:26

== Charts ==
=== Weekly charts ===
Weekly chart performance for "Too Much"
Chart (2020–2021)	Peak position
CIS Airplay (TopHit)	7
Netherlands (Dutch Top 40 Tipparade)	15
New Zealand Hot Singles (RMNZ)	12
New Zealand Hot Singles (RMNZ) Alle Farben remix	31
Russia Airplay (TopHit)	4
Sweden Heatseeker (Sverigetopplistan)	17
US Hot Dance/Electronic Songs (Billboard)	8

=== Year-end charts ===
Year-end chart performance for "Too Much"
Chart (2021)	Position
CIS (TopHit)	111
Russia Airplay (TopHit)	101
US Hot Dance/Electronic Songs (Billboard)	44

== Certifications ==
Certifications for "Too Much"
Region	Certification	Certified units/sales
Brazil (Pro-Música Brasil)	Platinum	40,000^{‡}
^{‡} Sales+streaming figures based on certification alone.
