= Nvdes =

American experimental music artist

NVDES
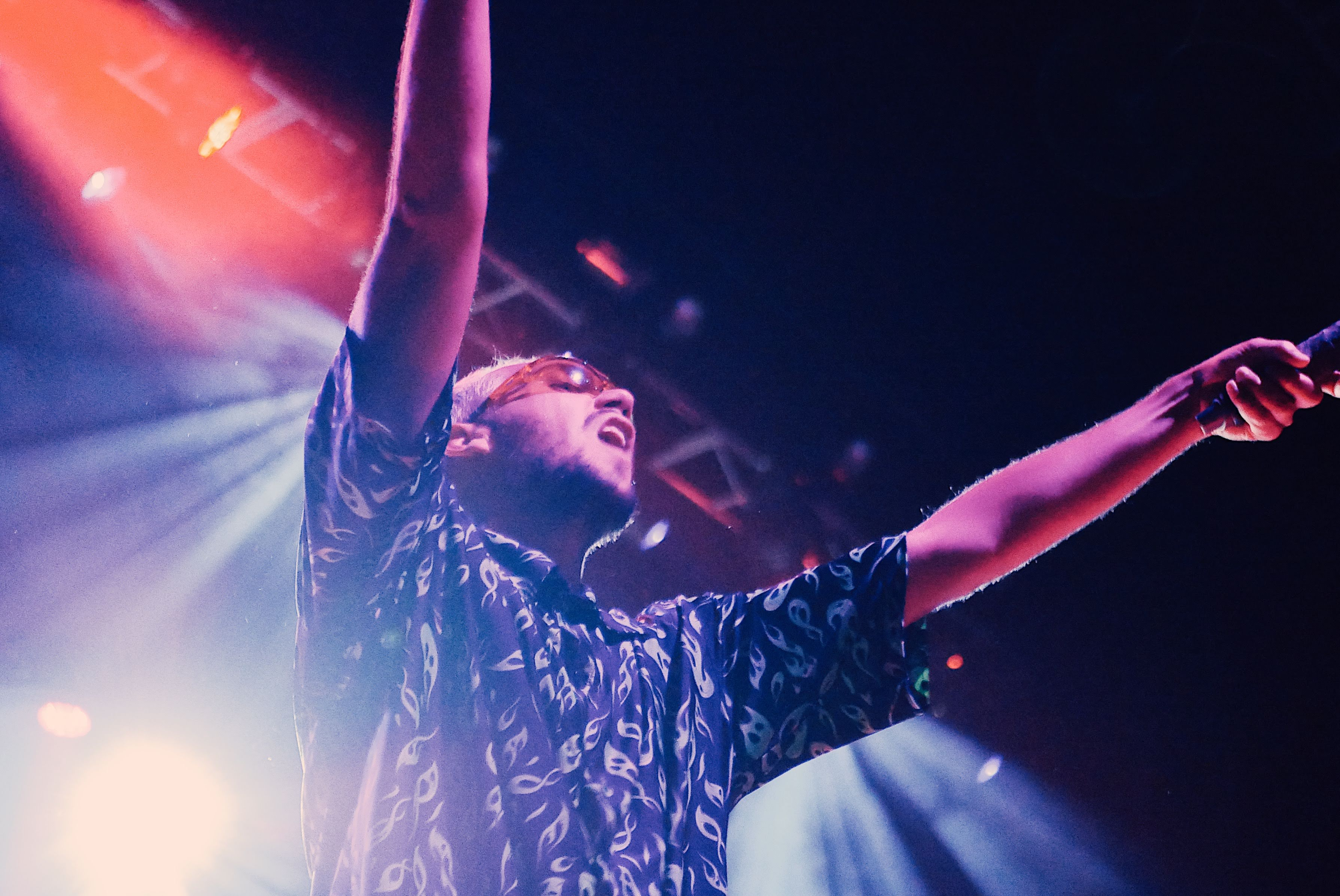
- NVDES performs live in Oakland, September 2019.

Background information
- Origin: Los Angeles, California, U.S.
- Genres: Indie pop; indietronica; electropop
- Years active: 2015–present
- Labels: Maison Nvdité; AWAL
- Members: Josh Ocean

NVDES is an experimental indie pop, indietronica, and electropop project based in Los Angeles, California. Founded by Josh Ocean in 2015, NVDES has released several singles and a visual album, Vibe City Utah (2018).

== Song usage ==
NVDES was dubbed "Apple's unofficial house band" after the band was featured in various Apple commercials over the years. In January 2018, the song "D.Y.T. (Do Your Thing)", featuring Remmi, was featured in an iPhone X commercial. The song "Brazooka" was featured in the iPhone 11 commercial in September 2019, and in April 2020, the song "Purusha" was featured in the iPhone SE commercial.

The song "Ou La La La (All Eyes On Us)" was also featured in a 2020 MIRROR by Lululemon commercial.

== Discography ==
=== Albums ===
- Vibe City Utah (2018)
- Nvdity Worldwide (2020)

=== EPs ===
- Life with Lobsters (2016)
- La NVDITÉ, Vol. 1 (2016)
- Vol. 2 (2017)

=== Singles ===
- "Before the Weekend Comes" (2015)
- "Unforgettable" (2015)
- "Fela" (2015)
- "Don't Fvck Your Neighbor" (2016)
- "The Other Side" 7", B3SCI Records (2016)
- "Can You Not" (2016)
- "8am" (2016)
- "My Mind Is" featuring Oliver Tree (2016)
- "Turning Heads" (2017)
- "Do You Think About Me" (2017)
- "D.Y.T. (Do Your Thing)" with Remmi (2017)
- "Louì" (2018)
- "Anything Goes" (2018)

=== Features ===
- "Better Places" by Pierce Fulton (2017)
