= What If I Never Get Over You =

Single by Lady Antebellum

from the album Ocean
- Released: May 17, 2019
- Recorded: March 4, 2019
- Studio: Starstruck Recording Studios (Nashville, Tennessee)
- Genre: Country
- Length: 3:26
- Label: BMLG Records
- Songwriters: Ryan Hurd; Sam Ellis; Laura Veltz; Jon Green
- Producer: Dann Huff

Lady Antebellum singles chronology
| "Heart Break" (2017) | "What If I Never Get Over You" (2019) | "Ocean" (2019) |

Music video
- "What If I Never Get Over You" on YouTube

"What If I Never Get Over You" is a song written by Ryan Hurd, Sam Ellis, Laura Veltz and Jon Green, and recorded by American country music trio Lady Antebellum. It was released to country radio on May 17, 2019, and serves as Lady Antebellum's first single on BMLG Records after signing with the label in August 2018, and it features lead vocals from both Hillary Scott and Charles Kelley. The song serves as the lead single for the group's eighth studio album, Ocean.

== Background ==
"What If I Never Get Over You" was written by singer-songwriter Ryan Hurd with Sam Ellis, Laura Veltz and Jon Green for Universal Music Publishing Nashville. The track was written to depict the "portrait of perpetual, never-ending heartbreak" Hurd imagined he would feel if he were to separate from his wife, fellow singer Maren Morris. During the development process, Veltz proposed grafting the word "what" onto the beginning of the hook and title to reflect the song's open-endedness. Originally sung by Hurd as a solo male demo, the song was pitched to Lady Antebellum by one of Nashville Harbor Records & Entertainment's senior A&R executives and adapted to a male-female duet. The group worked with producer Dann Huff for the track and recorded it on March 4, 2019 at Starstruck Recording Studios in Nashville, Tennessee.

Lady Antebellum performed the song at the 53rd Annual Country Music Association Awards alongside pop singer Halsey.

== Critical reception ==
Billy Dukes of Taste of Country wrote that the song opens a "new, more personal and revealing chapter" in the band's discography, adding that the song's production leads to a "slow rise of emotions" and enjoyable "tension" between the singers. Chris Parton of Sounds Like Nashville wrote that the song represents a return to the "rich, smooth sound" of the group's earlier hits. Both publications, as well as Rolling Stone and The Tennessean, remarked favorably upon the song's thematic and sonic similarities to Lady Antebellum's 2009 breakout hits "I Run to You" and "Need You Now", with Cindy Watts writing for the latter that, "fans can hear the difference – and the familiarity – on Lady Antebellum's new single."

== Commercial performance ==
"What If I Never Get Over You" debuted at number 14 on the Hot Country Songs chart and number 86 on the Hot 100 chart following its release. The song has since reached a peak position of 7 on the Hot Country Songs chart. On the Country Airplay chart, the song debuted at number 25 and topped the chart in January 2020, becoming the group's first number one single since "Bartender" in September 2014. "What If I Never Get Over You" has sold 154,000 copies in the United States as of February 2020.

== Music video ==
An accompanying music video directed by Sarah McColgan premiered alongside the song's release on May 17, 2019. The clip follows the story of a woman moving out of a shared home with her now ex-boyfriend with intercut scenes of the former relationship and the woman attempting to move on with a new man.

== Charts ==
=== Weekly charts ===
| Chart (2019–2020) | Peak position |
|---|---|
| Canada Hot 100 (Billboard) | 76 |
| Canada Country (Billboard) | 6 |
| US Billboard Hot 100 | 40 |
| US Hot Country Songs (Billboard) | 5 |
| US Country Airplay (Billboard) | 1 |
| US Rolling Stone Top 100 | 91 |

=== Year-end charts ===
| Chart (2019) | Position |
|---|---|
| US Country Airplay (Billboard) | 49 |
| US Hot Country Songs (Billboard) | 39 |

| Chart (2020) | Position |
|---|---|
| US Country Airplay (Billboard) | 43 |
| US Hot Country Songs (Billboard) | 40 |

== Certifications ==
Certifications for "What If I Never Get Over You"
| Region | Certification | Certified units/sales |
|---|---|---|
| Canada (Music Canada) | Platinum | 80,000^{‡} |
| United States (RIAA) | Platinum | 1,000,000^{‡} |
^{‡} Sales+streaming figures based on certification alone.
