= Solo Quiero (Somebody to Love) =

Single by Leona Lewis, Cali y El Dandee and Juan Magán
- Released: 28 August 2019
- Recorded: 2019
- Length: 2:52
- Label: Cabaletta Limited
- Songwriter(s): Alejandro Rengifo; Alessando Calemme; Andrés Torres; Ester Dean; Juan Magán; Leona Lewis; Matthew Fonson; Mauricio Rengifo; Rosalyn "Rozee" Athalie Chivonne Lockhart; Ryan Tedder; Shane McAnally
- Producer(s): Ryan Tedder; Alejandro Rengifo; Mauricio Rengifo; Andrés Torres

Leona Lewis singles chronology
"Headlights" (2018)	"Solo Quiero (Somebody to Love)" (2019)	"Kiss Me It's Christmas" (2021)

Cali y El Dandee singles chronology
"Sólo Mía" (2019)	"Solo Quiero (Somebody To Love)" (2019)

Juan Magán singles chronology
"Sobrenatural" (2019)	"Solo Quiero (Somebody To Love)" (2019)

Songland singles chronology
"Be Nice" (2019)	"Solo Quiero (Somebody to Love)" (2019)	"Champagne Night" (2020)

Music video
- "Leona Lewis, Cali Y El Dandee, Juan Magán - Solo Quiero (Somebody To Love) (From Songland)" on YouTube

"Solo Quiero (Somebody to Love)" is a song performed by British singer and songwriter Leona Lewis, Colombian Latin Pop Music urban duo Cali y El Dandee and Spanish producer, singer, remixer and DJ Juan Magán. The song was released, in the US, as a digital download on 30 August 2019 by Cabaletta Limited. The song did not enter the Billboard Hot 100, but peaked at number one on the Latin Pop Digital Song Sales. The song was written by Alejandro Rengifo, Alessando Calemme, Andrés Torres, Ester Dean, Juan Magán, Leona Lewis, Matthew Fonson, Mauricio Rengifo, Rosalyn "Rozee" Athalie Chivonne Lockhart, Ryan Tedder and Shane McAnally.

== Background ==
The song featured on the American songwriting competition series Songland. Leona Lewis was the musical guest during the ninth episode on 28 August 2019. She released this song, the winning song, as a single the same day. Three time Grammy-award nominee Leona Lewis was the first British singer-songwriter on the show. "Solo Quiero (Somebody to Love)" shot to number one on the US iTunes Latino chart after its release. Since its release, the song has also peaked at number one on several US Billboard Latin charts, including the Latin Digital Song Sales.

== Charts ==
Chart (2019)	Peak position
US Latin Pop Digital Song Sales (Billboard)	1
US Latin Digital Song Sales (Billboard)	1
US Latin Rhythm Digital Song Sales (Billboard)	1

== Release history ==
Region	Date	Format	Label
United States	28 August 2019	Digital download; streaming	Cabaletta Limited
