= Ester Dean discography =

The discography of American hip hop singer and producer Ester Dean consists of 18 singles and an extended play. Her debut single, "Drop It Low", featuring Chris Brown, peaked on the Billboard Hot 100 at number 38.

== Extended plays ==
List of extended plays, with selected chart positions, showing year released
Title	Details	
Miss Ester Dean	Released: March 23, 2015; Label: Self-released; Formats: Digital download	Track list: 1. "Keeper"; 2. "Jealous"; 3. "Any Other Way"; 4. "That Girl"; 5. "F*ck It"; 6. "New Sh*t"
"—" denotes a recording that did not chart or was not released in that territory.

== Soundtrack albums ==
List of extended plays, with selected chart positions, showing year released
Title	Details	Peak Chart Positions									Certifications
Title	Details	US	US OST	AUS	AUT	CAN	GER	IRE	NZ	UK Comp.	Certifications
Pitch Perfect: Original Motion Picture Soundtrack	Released: September 25, 2012; Label: Universal Music; Formats: Digital download, CD, LP	1	3	9	16	15	50	6	14	10	RIAA: Platinum; ARIA: Platinum
Pitch Perfect 2: Original Motion Picture Soundtrack	Released: May 12, 2015; Label: Universal Music; Formats: Digital download, CD, LP	1	1	3	11	3	12	—	8	—	
Pitch Perfect 3: Original Motion Picture Soundtrack	Released: December 15, 2017; Label: Universal Music; Formats: Digital download, CD, LP	20	2	7	—	23	—	—	—	—	

== Singles ==
List of singles, with selected chart positions, showing year released and album name
Title	Year	Peak chart positions				Album
Title	Year	US	US R&B/HH	US Pop	AUS	Album
"Drop It Low" (featuring Chris Brown)	2009	38	33	32	—	More than a Game OST
"Baby Makin' Love"	2012	—	—	—	—	—
"Bam Bam"	2012	—	—	—	—	—
"I Can't Make You Love Me"	2013	—	—	—	—	—
"How You Love It" (featuring Missy Elliott)	2013	—	—	—	—	—
"Get My Dough"	2014	—	—	—	—	—
"Twerkin 4 Birkin" (featuring Juicy J)	2014	—	—	—	—	—
"Crazy Youngsters"	2015	—	—	—	99	Pitch Perfect 2 OST
"Joy to the World"	2017	—	—	—	—	Non-album single
"—" denotes a recording that did not chart or was not released in that territory.

=== As featured artist ===
List of singles, with selected chart positions, showing year released and album name
Title	Year	Peak chart positions								Album
Title	Year	US	US R&B/HH	US Rhythm	AUT	BUL	FRA	NL	SWI	Album
"Super Bass" (Nicki Minaj featuring Ester Dean)	2011	3	6	1	42	—	—	82	58	Pink Friday
"Love Suicide" (Tinie Tempah featuring Ester Dean)	2011	—	—	—	—	10	—	20	—	Disc-Overy
"Invincible" (MGK featuring Ester Dean)	2011	— (Note: "Invincible" did not enter the US Billboard Hot 100, but peaked at number eight on the Bubbling Under Hot 100 Singles chart.)	— (Note: "Invincible" did not enter the US Hot R&B/Hip-Hop Songs chart, but peaked at number 10 on the Bubbling Under Hot R&B/Hip-Hop Singles chart.)	32	—	—	—	—	—	Lace Up
"We've Only Just Begun" (Michael Woods featuring Ester Dean)	2012	—	—		—	—	—	—	—	Non-album single
"Bellas Finals" (with the Cast of Pitch Perfect)	2012	85	—		62	—	—	—	—	Pitch Perfect: Original Motion Picture Soundtrack
"Riff Off" (with the Cast of Pitch Perfect)	2012	86	—		70	—	—	—	—	Pitch Perfect: Original Motion Picture Soundtrack
"Pool Mashup" (with the Cast of Pitch Perfect)	2012	111	—		—	—	—	—	—	Pitch Perfect: Original Motion Picture Soundtrack
"Another Life" (Afrojack and David Guetta featuring Ester Dean)	2017	—	—	—	73	—	115	64	65	Non-album single
"When You're Gone" (Afrojack and Jewelz & Sparks featuring Ester Dean)	2018	—	—	—	—	—	—	—	—	Press Play
"Rooted" (Ciara featuring Ester Dean)	2020	—	—	—	—	—	—	—	—	Non-album single
"—" denotes a recording that did not chart or was not released in that territory.

== Other appearances ==
Year	Title	Album	Other artist (s)
2009	"I Love U"	Graffiti	Chris Brown
2010	"I Know You Got a Man"	Battle of the Sexes	Ludacris, Flo Rida
2010	"Grammy"	The DeAndre Way	Soulja Boy
2011	"Let Me Take You To Rio (Blu's Arrival)"	Rio: Music from the Motion Picture	Carlinhos Brown
2011	"Take You To Rio"	Rio: Music from the Motion Picture	—
2012	"Popped Off"	Fuck Da City Up	T.I., Dr. Dre, Sly "Pyper" Jordan
2012	"Let It Grow (Celebrate the World)"	Dr. Seuss' The Lorax: Original Songs from the Motion Picture	—
2012	"We Are (Family)"	Ice Age: Continental Drift (plays during credits only)	Keke Palmer, Ray Romano, Queen Latifah, John Leguizamo, Denis Leary, Jennifer Lopez, Nicki Minaj, Drake, Heather Morris
2013	"Bad Bitches"	RockaByeBaby	Cassie
2013	"Wide Open"	Underground Luxury	B.o.B
2014	"Rio Rio"	Rio 2: Music from the Motion Picture	B.o.B
2014	"We've Only Just Begun"	FABRICLIVE 76: Calyx & TeeBee	Calyx & Teebee, Michael Woods
2016	"Textmergency"	Crazy Ex-Girlfriend: Original Television Soundtrack (Season 1, Volume 2)	Ivan Hernandez, Briga Heelen, Jeff Hiller, Scott Vance
2016	"Where Is the Rock?"	Crazy Ex-Girlfriend: Original Television Soundtrack (Season 1, Volume 2)	Ivan Hernandez, Briga Heelen, Jeff Hiller, Scott Vance

== Music videos ==
Year	Title	Director	Ref.
2009	"Drop It Low"	Joseph Kahn	
2012	"Invincible"	Isaac Rentz	
2014	"Baby Making Love"		
2015	"New Shit"		
2015	"Crazy Youngsters"		
