= SexBeat =

Single by Usher, Lil Jon and Ludacris
- Released: April 10, 2020
- Recorded: 2015
- Genre: R&B; trap
- Length: 4:46
- Label: RCA
- Songwriters: Usher Raymond; Jonathan Smith; Christopher Bridges; Luke Wylde; Antoine Harris; Luke Calleja; Jermaine Dupri
- Producers: Dawg; Lil Jon

Usher singles chronology
"Come Thru" (2020)	"SexBeat" (2020)	"California" (2020)

Lil Jon singles chronology
"Oxy" (2019)	"SexBeat" (2020)	"What We On" (2023)

Ludacris singles chronology
"Quiero Saber" (2018)	"SexBeat" (2020)	"Found You" (2020)

"SexBeat" is a song by American singer Usher alongside American rappers Lil Jon and Ludacris, released on April 10, 2020. It is the third song between the trio, following "Yeah!" and "Lovers and Friends". Produced by Lil Jon, the song was written by the artists alongside Jermaine Dupri and Antoine Harris.

== Background and release ==
On April 4, 2020, T-Pain and Lil Jon appeared on Swizz Beatz and Timbaland's Instagram Live songwriting battle show #VERZUZ that was watched by over 275,000 viewers. At the end of the battle Lil Jon played never-before-heard song called "SexBeat".

During the Live, Lil Jon revealed that the song was recorded over two years ago. Lil Jon also revealed that he had to beg Usher to allow him to play it. It was officially released for digital download and streaming on April 11, 2020.

== Credits and personnel ==
Credits adapted from Tidal.

- Usher – vocals, songwriter
- Ludacris – vocals, songwriter
- Lil Jon - vocals, songwriter, producer, mixing engineer, programmer
- Jermaine Dupri – songwriter
- Antoine Harris - songwriter
- Bobby Ross Avila - songwriter, piano, guitars
- Kronic - songwriter, misc. producer
- Colin Leonard – mastering engineer
- Bill Zimmerman – assistant engineer
- Phil Tan – mixing engineer, misc. producer
- Ben "Bengineer" Chang - recording engineer, vocal producer

== Charts ==
Chart (2020)	Peak position
New Zealand Hot Singles (Recorded Music NZ)	30
US Digital Song Sales (Billboard)	39
US R&B/Hip-Hop Airplay (Billboard)	44
US Rhythmic Airplay (Billboard)	37
