= Caroline Kole =

American singer, songwriter and musician

Caroline Kole (born Caroline Kudelko; July 2, 1997) is an American singer, songwriter, and guitarist who began performing under the stage name Suite Caroline.

== Career ==
Kole records under the Starstruck Records label and has a publishing contract with Sony/ATV. Beginning in 2013, she was on a two-year international tour with Reba McEntire, opening shows for the performer. She was also one of the singers featured on Reba McEntire's release "Pray for Peace".

In 2013, Starstruck Records released a five-track EP of Kole's, including the single "Money to Me". That release reached the number one spot on the Country Music Television (CMT) Pure Countdown. The video from her second release, "If He'd Ever Look Up", was number one for several weeks on CMT Pure, and CMT also named her a "Listen Up" Artist. Both songs have also been featured on SiriusXM satellite radio.

Kole has an endorsement arrangement with Martin Guitars. She was 12 years old when she was first promoted by the company at the NAMM Show. At age 14, she began playing at the County Music Association (CMA) Festival.

In addition to McEntire, Kole has performed on stage with Charlie Daniels, Pat Benatar, and Sheryl Crow. She has opened shows for artists such as Blake Shelton, Alan Jackson, Eric Church and Martina McBride.

"Winter", a song Kole wrote about the dolphin featured in the Warner Brothers movies Dolphin Tale and Dolphin Tale 2, appears on the soundtrack of the documentary Winter, the Dolphin that Can.

In May 2018, via Starstruck Records, Caroline Kole made her transition from country to pop with a self-titled EP release featuring the singles "Right Now", "Adamantine", and "Ghost". Kole has solidified her move to pop music with her latest July 2018 release of "What If". Her latest song released in 2019 is a single titled "Freaking Out!" This was released shortly after the two singles; "Missing Each Other" and "Easy."

In 2023, Caroline auditioned for season 21 of American Idol, where she finished in the Top 24.
