= Ester Dean =

American singer-songwriter (born 1986)

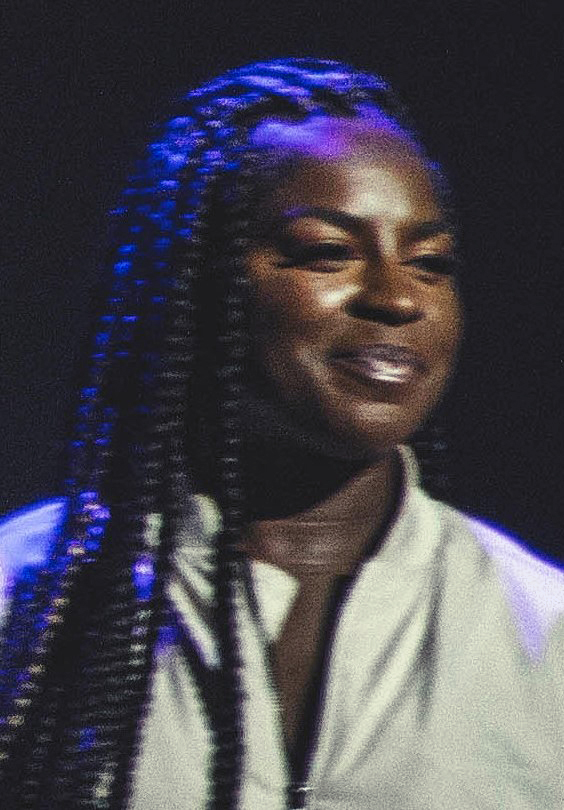
- Dean in 2017

Background information
- Born: Esther Renay Dean; 15 April 1986 (age 40); Muskogee, Oklahoma, U.S.
- Genres: R&B; pop
- Occupations: Singer-songwriter; record producer; actress
- Years active: 2006–present
- Labels: Zone 4; Interscope

Esther Renay Dean, known professionally as Ester Dean, is an American singer-songwriter, record producer, and actress. She rose to prominence as a pop songwriter in the late 2000s and wrote many songs for singers including Rihanna, Katy Perry, Britney Spears, Nicki Minaj, and Beyoncé through the 2010s. She has acted in several films, including the 2012 musical comedy Pitch Perfect and its sequels.

== Life and career ==
Esther Renay Dean was born in Muskogee, Oklahoma, to single mother Hester Dean and raised in Tulsa, Oklahoma, as the younger of five children. She is of Black Indian descent. She began singing at a young age. When Esther was 15, her mother moved her and her sister Deandria to Omaha, Nebraska, where she began working as a session singer and writing for local musicians. At the age of 20, Dean moved to Atlanta with $500 to pursue a career as a songwriter and record producer. She was discovered by music producer Christopher "Tricky" Stewart, who overheard Dean singing along in the crowd of a Gap Band concert. On the strength of her voice and songwriting ability, Tricky signed Dean for a publishing contract.

Dean later parted ways with Tricky and relocated to Los Angeles, where she was introduced to Polow da Don and signed a deal with Zone 4 Records under the aegis of Interscope Records. In 2009, Dean released her debut single as a lead artist, "Drop It Low", which featured singer Chris Brown and production by Polow da Don; the song peaked at number 38 on the US Billboard Hot 100 and became her only Top 40 single as a lead artist.

Dean's commercial breakthrough came when she collaborated with Stargate on the number one Rihanna single "Rude Boy". She continued to write hit songs for Rihanna, including "What's My Name" and "Where Have You Been", as well as Katy Perry's "Firework" and Nicki Minaj's "Super Bass".

In 2011, Dean contributed to the soundtrack for the animated film Rio by Blue Sky Studios.

She has written, and sometimes produced, Top 40 hits for artists including Rihanna, Christina Aguilera, Florence + The Machine, Beyoncé, Drake, Selena Gomez, Mary J. Blige, Kelly Clarkson, Ciara, The Pussycat Dolls, Usher, Kelly Rowland, R. Kelly, Britney Spears, and Lil Wayne.

She appeared as Cynthia Rose in Pitch Perfect, released in 2012, and reprised the role in the sequels Pitch Perfect 2 (2015) and Pitch Perfect 3 (2017).

In 2022, she was on the jury panel for American Song Contest representing Oklahoma.

== Artistry ==
=== Voice ===
Dean possesses a mezzo-soprano range. Her vocals were described by Billboard as "raw, energetic vocals [that] cover a wide range: from club banger to melodic doo-wop/hip-hop." Dean's vocals have also been described as similar to Rihanna and Nicki Minaj. "The songwriter's voice is pitched dead center between two artists. The first is frequent collaborator Rihanna...the other is Nicki Minaj when she sings."

=== Songwriting style ===
In a 2012 article in The New Yorker, Dean described her preferred method of songwriting: "I go into the booth and I scream and I sing and I yell, and sometimes it's words but most time [sic] it's not...and I just see when I get this little chill [on her upper arm, below the shoulder] and then I'm, like, 'Yeah, that's the hook.'"

== Filmography ==
=== Film ===
Year	Title	Role
2011	Rio	Boy in Gondola (voice)
2012	Ice Age: Continental Drift	Sloth Siren and Gutt's Siren (voice)
2012	Pitch Perfect	Cynthia-Rose Adams
2015	Pitch Perfect 2	Cynthia-Rose Adams
2017	Pitch Perfect 3	Cynthia-Rose Adams
2020	Trolls World Tour	Legsly (voice)

=== Television ===
Year	Title	Role	Notes
2016	Crazy Ex-Girlfriend	Vanessa	Episode: "That Text Was Not Meant for Josh!"
2016	RuPaul's Drag Race	Guest Judge (season 8)	Episode: "Bitch Perfect"
2019–2020	Songland	Herself - Judge	
2020	The Voice	Herself - Guest Judge	Episode: "Live Final Top 5 Performances"
2020–2022	Central Park	Hazel (voice)	7 episodes
2021	Clash of the Cover Bands	Herself - Judge	Season 1
2021	Trolls: Holiday in Harmony	Legsly (voice)	short Christmas special
2022	American Song Contest	Herself - Oklahoma Judge	8 episodes

== Accolades ==
Year	Ceremony	Nominated work	Category	Result	Ref.
2011	BMI R&B/Hip-Hop Awards	"Hot Tottie" (as a writer)	Award-Winning Urban Songs	Won	
2011	BMI R&B/Hip-Hop Awards	"I Am" (as a writer)	Award-Winning Urban Songs	Won	
2011	BMI R&B/Hip-Hop Awards	"Rude Boy" (as a writer)	Award-Winning Urban Songs	Won	
2011	BMI R&B/Hip-Hop Awards	"Sex Therapy" (as a writer)	Award-Winning Urban Songs	Won	
2012	Grammy Awards	Loud (as a producer and writer)	Album of the Year	Nominated	
2012	BMI Pop Awards	Herself	Songwriter of the Year	Won	
2012	BMI Pop Awards	"Firework" (as a writer)	Pop Song of the Year	Won	
2012	BMI Pop Awards	"Firework" (as a writer)	Award-Winning Pop Songs	Won	
2012	BMI Pop Awards	"Super Bass" (as a writer)	Award-Winning Pop Songs	Won	
2012	BMI Pop Awards	"Rude Boy" (as a writer)	Award-Winning Pop Songs	Won	
2012	BMI Pop Awards	"S&M" (as a writer)	Award-Winning Pop Songs	Won	
2012	BMI Pop Awards	"What's My Name?" (as a writer)	Award-Winning Pop Songs	Won	
2012	BMI R&B/Hip-Hop Awards	"Super Bass" (as a writer)	Urban Song of the Year	Won	
2012	BMI R&B/Hip-Hop Awards	"Super Bass" (as a writer)	Award-Winning Urban Songs	Won	
2012	BMI R&B/Hip-Hop Awards	"What's My Name?" (as a writer)	Award-Winning Urban Songs	Won	
2013	BMI Pop Awards	"Mr. Know It All" (as a writer)	Award-Winning Pop Songs	Won	
2013	BMI Pop Awards	"Turn Me On" (as a writer)	Award-Winning Pop Songs	Won	
2013	BMI Pop Awards	"Where Have You Been" (as a writer)	Award-Winning Pop Songs	Won	
2013	MTV Movie Awards	Pitch Perfect (shared with the cast)	Best Musical Moment	Won	
2013	Annie Awards	Ice Age: Continental Drift (as a producer)	Best Music in a Feature Production	Nominated	
2015	Hollywood Music in Media Awards	"Dancing in the Dark" (as a writer)	Best Song – Animated Film	Won	
2016	BMI London Awards	"Hey Mama" (as a writer)	Dance Award	Won	
2016	BMI London Awards	"Hey Mama" (as a writer)	Award-Winning Pop Songs	Won	
2016	BMI Pop Awards	"Hey Mama" (as a writer)	Award-Winning Pop Songs	Won	
2021	Canadian Country Music Awards	"Champagne Night" (as a writer)	Songwriter of the Year	Won	
