= Sara Evans discography =

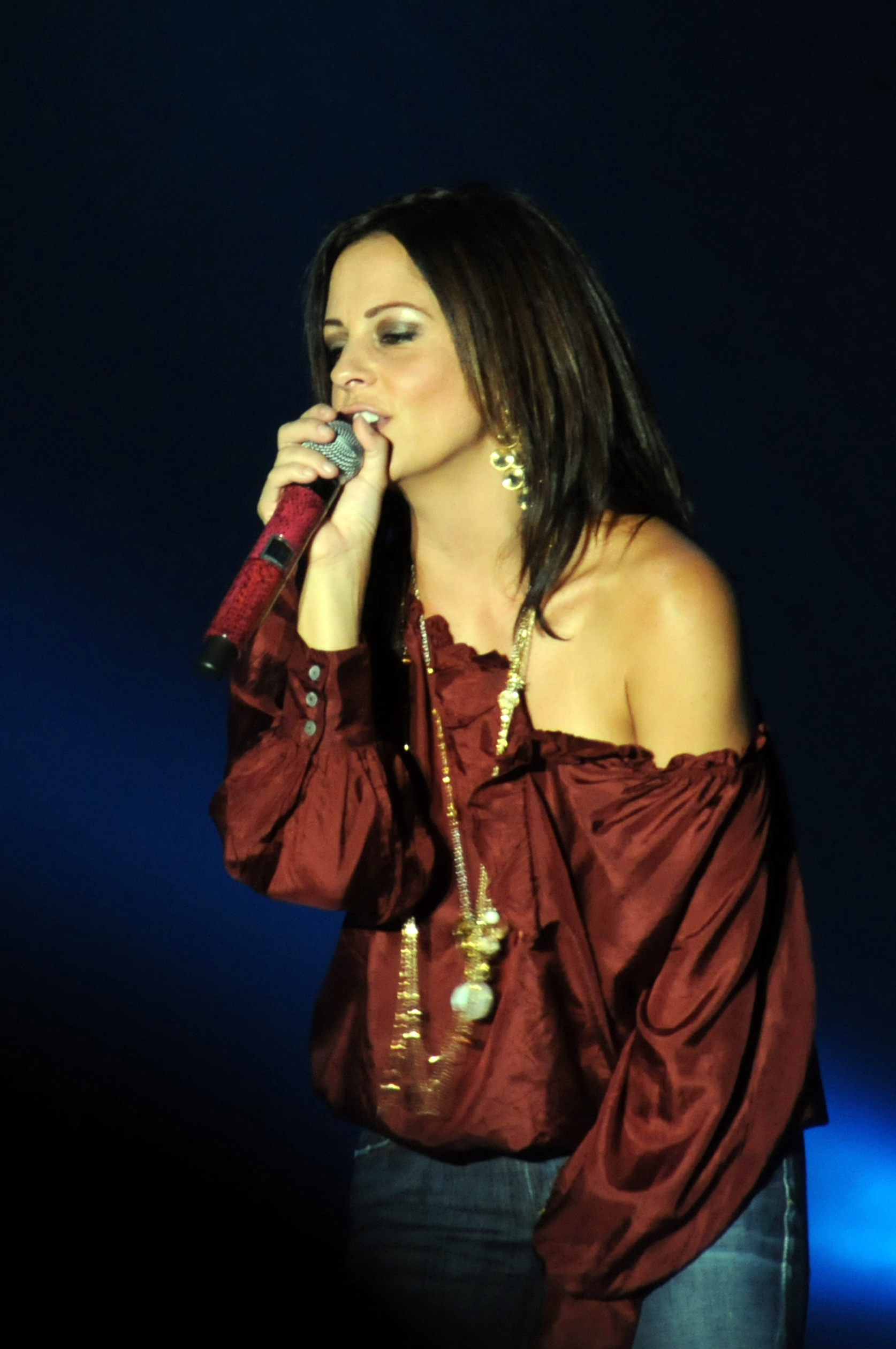
- Sara Evans performing at the Naval Amphibious Base, 2008.
- Studio albums: 11
- Extended plays: 2
- Live albums: 1
- Compilation albums: 6
- Singles: 44
- Video albums: 1
- Music videos: 23
- Other charted songs: 2
- Other appearances: 23

The discography of American country music artist Sara Evans consists of 11 studio albums, three compilation albums, two extended plays, one video album, three additional albums, 44 singles and four other charted songs. After briefly recording with "E and S Records", Evans reworked her musical direction and signed with RCA Nashville in 1997. Her debut album, Three Chords and the Truth, was released in July 1997. Although the singles were unsuccessful, it was critically acclaimed. Her second studio album was released in October 1998 entitled No Place That Far. The title track reached the top of the Billboard Hot Country Singles and Tracks chart. The success helped the album earn gold certification in the United States. Evans' third studio album, Born to Fly, was released in October 2000. Born to Fly reached number six on the Top Country Albums chart and the top-sixty of the Billboard 200. Its title track became her second number-one hit on the Hot Country Songs chart. The album also spawned the hits "I Could Not Ask for More", "Saints & Angels", and "I Keep Looking". It is the best-selling album of Evans' career, having been certified 2× platinum in the United States. In August 2003, she released the pop-inspired Restless, whose lead single "Perfect" reached the Top 5. Restless was certified platinum in the United States shortly after the success of its third single "Suds in the Bucket", which became Evans' third number one hit.

Evans' fifth studio album, Real Fine Place, was released in October 2005; it became her first record to debut at number one on the Billboard Top Country Albums chart, for selling one hundred thirty thousand copies in its first week. It also debuted at number three on the Billboard 200. "A Real Fine Place to Start" was its lead single and peaked on the top spot of the Hot Country Songs chart, while the second single "Cheatin'" reached the Top 10. After filing for divorce in 2006, Evans delayed the release of new music. Instead, a greatest hits package was issued, and its first single "As If" became a major hit. In March 2011, Evans issued Stronger, her first studio album in six years. It became her second effort to top the Billboard Top Country Albums chart and its first single, "A Little Bit Stronger" became Evans' fifth number one hit. Her seventh studio album, Slow Me Down, was released in March 2014. That album's title track peaked at number 19 on the Hot Country Songs chart, making Evans one of four female country artists to have a Top 40 hit in 2014. Evans's eighth studio album Words was released in July 2017 and debuted at number 4 on the Top Country Albums chart.

== Albums ==
=== Studio albums ===
List of albums, with selected chart positions, certifications, and other relevant details
Title	Album details	Peak chart positions				Sales	Certifications
Title	Album details	US	US Cou.	CAN Cou.	UK Cou.	Sales	Certifications
Three Chords and the Truth	Released: July 1, 1997; Label: RCA Nashville; Formats: CD, cassette	—	56	—	—		
No Place That Far	Released: October 27, 1998; Label: RCA Nashville; Formats: CD, cassette	116	11	4	—		RIAA: Gold
Born to Fly	Released: October 10, 2000; Label: RCA Nashville; Formats: CD, cassette	55	6	12	—		RIAA: 2× Platinum; MC: Gold
Restless	Released: August 19, 2003; Label: RCA Nashville; Formats: CD, cassette	20	3	—	—	US: 917,000	RIAA: Platinum
Real Fine Place	Released: October 4, 2005; Label: RCA Nashville; Formats: CD, digital download	3	1	—	—		RIAA: Platinum
Stronger	Released: March 8, 2011; Label: RCA Nashville; Formats: CD, digital download	6	1	—	4	US: 405,000	RIAA: Gold
Slow Me Down	Released: March 11, 2014; Label: RCA Nashville; Formats: CD, digital download	9	2	—	3	US: 87,000	
At Christmas (Note: At Christmas also peaked at number thirty four on the Billboard Top Holiday Albums chart in 2014.)	Released: November 17, 2014; Label: RCA Nashville; Formats: CD, digital download	135	21	—	—		
Words	Released: July 21, 2017; Label: Born to Fly; Formats: CD, digital download, LP	46	4	—	—	US: 26,800	
Copy That	Released: May 15, 2020; Label: Born to Fly; Formats: CD, digital download, LP	— (Note: Copy That reached number 44 on the Billboard Top Album Sales chart and number 30 on Billboard's Current Albums Sales chart.)	—	—	—		
Unbroke	Released: June 7, 2024; Label: Born to Fly, Melody Place; Formats: CD, digital download, LP	—	—	—	—		
"—" denotes a recording that did not chart or was not released in that territory.

=== Compilation albums ===
List of albums, with selected chart positions, certifications, and other relevant details
Title	Album details	Peak chart positions			Certifications
Title	Album details	US	US Cou.	CAN Cou.	Certifications
CMT Girls' Night Out (with Martina McBride, Mindy McCready, and Lorrie Morgan)	Released: October 12, 1999; Label: BNA; Formats: CD, cassette	—	30	8	
Feels Like Home (Note: Feels Like Home was only available for a limited time at Cracker Barrel stores.)	Released: December 6, 2005; Label: Sony BMG; Formats: CD	—	—	—	
Always There (Note: Always There was only available for a limited time at Hallmark stores, and featured the exclusive songs "You Ought to Know by Now" and "Brooklyn & Austin".)	Released: May 15, 2006; Label: Hallmark; Formats: CD	—	—	—	
The Early Years	Released: June 21, 2007; Label: E&S; Formats: CD, digital download	—	—	—	
Greatest Hits	Released: October 9, 2007; Label: RCA Nashville; Formats: CD, digital download	8	3	—	RIAA: Gold
Playlist: The Very Best of Sara Evans	Released: January 29, 2013; Label: Legacy Recordings; Formats: CD	—	73	—	
Country	Released: October 3, 2014; Label: Sony BMG; Formats: CD	—	—	—	
"—" denotes a recording that did not chart or was not released in that territory.

=== Live albums ===
List of albums, with other relevant details
Title	Extended play details
Live from City Winery Nashville (with the Barker Family Band)	Released: August 30, 2019; Label: Born to Fly; Formats: Digital download

=== Extended plays ===
List of extended plays, with other relevant details
Title	Extended play details
I'll Be Home for Christmas	Released: November 3, 2009; Label: RCA Nashville; Formats: Digital download
The Barker Family Band (with the Barker Family Band)	Released: April 12, 2019; Label: Born to Fly; Formats: Digital download

== Singles ==
=== As lead artist ===
List of singles, with selected chart positions and certifications
Title	Year	Peak chart positions					Certifications	Album
Title	Year	US	US Cou.	US Coun. Air.	CAN	CAN Cou. (Note: Chart positions from RPM Country Tracks from 1998 to 2000, Radio & Records from 2004 to 2005, and Billboard Canada Country from 2006 to present.)	Certifications	Album
"True Lies"	1997	—	59		—	—		Three Chords and the Truth
"Three Chords and the Truth"	1997	—	44		—	—		Three Chords and the Truth
"Shame About That"	1997	—	48		—	—		Three Chords and the Truth
"Cryin' Game"	1998	—	56		—	82		No Place That Far
"No Place That Far"	1998	37	1		—	4		No Place That Far
"Fool, I'm a Woman"	1999	—	32		—	33		No Place That Far
"Born to Fly"	2000	34	1		—	7 (Note: "Born to Fly" reached number 7 when RPM ceased publication in November 2000.)		Born to Fly
"I Could Not Ask for More"	2001	35	2		—	×		Born to Fly
"Saints & Angels"	2001	— (Note: "Saints & Angels" did not enter the Hot 100, but peaked at number 3 on Bubbling Under Hot 100 Singles, which acts as a 25-song extension of the Hot 100.)	16		—	×		Born to Fly
"I Keep Looking"	2002	35	5		—	×		Born to Fly
"Backseat of a Greyhound Bus"	2003	— (Note: "Backseat of a Greyhound Bus" did not enter the Hot 100, but peaked at number 3 on Bubbling Under Hot 100 Singles, which acts as a 25-song extension of the Hot 100.)	16		—	×		Restless
"Perfect"	2003	46	2		—	16		Restless
"Suds in the Bucket"	2004	33	1		—	3	RIAA: Platinum	Restless
"Tonight"	2004	—	41		—	—		Restless
"A Real Fine Place to Start"	2005	38	1		—	1	RIAA: Gold	Real Fine Place
"Cheatin'"	2005	69	9		—	5		Real Fine Place
"Coalmine"	2006	—	37		—	28		Real Fine Place
"You'll Always Be My Baby"	2006	— (Note: "You'll Always Be My Baby" did not enter the Hot 100, but peaked at number 5 on Bubbling Under Hot 100 Singles, which acts as a 25-song extension of the Hot 100.)	13		—	30		Real Fine Place
"As If"	2007	62	11		81	18		Greatest Hits
"Some Things Never Change"	2008	—	26		—	—		Greatest Hits
"Love You With All My Heart"	2008	—	—		—	—		Greatest Hits
"Low"	2008	—	59		—	—		Billy: The Early Years
"Feels Just Like a Love Song"	2009	—	59		—	—		Non-album single
"A Little Bit Stronger"	2010	34	1		75	6	RIAA: Platinum	Stronger
"My Heart Can't Tell You No"	2011	— (Note: "My Heart Can't Tell You No" did not enter the Hot 100, but peaked at number 5 on Bubbling Under Hot 100 Singles, which acts as a 25-song extension of the Hot 100.)	21		—	40		Stronger
"Anywhere"	2012	—	53		—	—		Stronger
"Slow Me Down"	2013	89	19	17	—	33		Slow Me Down
"Put My Heart Down"	2014	—	—	57	—	—		Slow Me Down
"Marquee Sign"	2017	—	—	—	—	—		Words
"All the Love You Left Me"	2018	—	—	—	—	—		Words
"Long Way Down"	2018	—	—	—	—	—		Words
"Pride"	2024	—	—	—	—	60		Unbroke
"—" denotes a recording that did not chart or was not released in that territory. "×" indicates that no relevant chart existed or was archived.

=== As a featured artist ===
List of featured singles, with selected chart positions
Title	Year	Peak chart positions			Album
Title	Year	US Bubb.	US Coun.	CAN Coun.	Album
"That's the Beat of a Heart" (with The Warren Brothers)	2000	13	22	38	King of Nothing
"Words Are Your Wheels" (as Phil Vassar and Friends)	2002	—	—	—	Non-album single
"—" denotes a recording that did not chart or was not released in that territory.

=== Promotional singles ===
List of promotional singles, with selected chart positions
Title	Year	Peak chart positions	Album	Ref.
Title	Year	US Country	Album	Ref.
"Can't Stop Loving You" (with Isaac Slade)	2014	—	Slow Me Down	
"Just Give Me a Reason" (Live)	2015	—	Non-album singles	
"Say" (Live)	2015	—	Non-album singles	
"Shut Up and Dance" (Live)	2015	—	Non-album singles	
"Infinite Love" (with Todd Chrisley)	2016	39	Non-album singles	
"If I Can't Have You"	2020	—	Copy That	
"I'm So Lonesome I Could Cry"	2020	—	Copy That	
"Hard to Say I'm Sorry"	2020	—	Copy That	
"If I Can't Have You" (remix)	2020	—	Non-album singles	
"Pink" (with Monica, Dolly Parton, Jordin Sparks and Rita Wilson)	2020	—	Non-album singles	
"Suds in the Bucket" (sped and slowed)	2023	—	Non-album singles	
"21 Days"	2024	—	Unbroke	
"Sorry Now"	2024	—	Unbroke	
"—" denotes a recording that did not chart or was not released in that territory.

== Other charted songs ==
List of other charted songs, with selected chart positions
Title	Year	Peak chart positions	Album
Title	Year	US Country	Album
"Missing Missouri"	2006	52	Real Fine Place
"I'll Be Home for Christmas"	2007	46	Hear Something Country: Christmas 2007

== Videography ==
=== Video albums ===
List of video albums, showing all relevant details
Title	Album details
The Video Collection	Released: September 19, 2006; Label: RCA Nashville; Formats: DVD

=== Music videos ===
List of music videos, showing year released and director
Title	Year	Director(s)	Ref.
"Three Chords and the Truth"	1997	Susan Johnson	
"I Don't Wanna See the Light"	1998	Susan Johnson	
"Crying Game"	1998	Susan Johnson	
"No Place That Far"	1998	Thom Oliphant	
"Fool, I'm a Woman"	1999	—N/a	
"That's the Beat of a Heart" (with The Warren Brothers)	2000	Shaun Silva	
"Born to Fly"	2000	Peter Zavadil	
"I Could Not Ask for More"	2001	Peter Zavadil	
"Saints & Angels"	2001	Peter Zavadil	
"Perfect"	2003	Bobby G	
"Suds in the Bucket"	2004	Peter Zavadil	
"A Real Fine Place to Start"	2005	Peter Zavadil	
"Cheatin'"	2005	Peter Zavadil	
"You'll Always Be My Baby"	2006	Kristin Barlowe	
"As If"	2007	Roman White	
"Low"	2008	Robby Benson; Roger Pistole	
"A Little Bit Stronger"	2010	Peter Zavadil	
"My Heart Can't Tell You No"	2011	Peter Zavadil	
"Anywhere" (Live)	2012	—N/a	
"Slow Me Down"	2013	Peter Zavadil	
"Put My Heart Down"	2014	Peter Zavadil	
"Marquee Sign"	2017	Peter Zavadil	
"Pride"	2024	Peter Zavadil	
"21 Days"	2024	Peter Zavadil	

== Other appearances ==
List of non-single guest appearances, with other performing artists, showing year released and album name
Title	Year	Other artist(s)	Album	Ref.
"Wrong Again" / "Whatever You Say"	1997	Martina McBride	Evolution	
"I Don't Wanna Play House"	1998	none	Tammy Wynette Remembered	
"The Distance Between You and Me"	1998	none	Songs of Dwight Yoakam: Will Sing for Food	
"Almost New"	1998	none	Clay Pigeons (soundtrack)	
"O Come All Ye Faithful"	1999	none	Country Christmas 1999	
"Are You Tired of Me, Darling"	2001	Ralph Stanley	Clinch Mountain Sweethearts	
"Go Tell It on the Mountain"	2001	none	Country Christmas 2001	
"Mamas Don't Let Your Babies Grow Up to Be Cowboys"	2003	Deana Carter	I've Always Been Crazy: A Tribute to Waylon Jennings	
"Sweet By and By"	2004	none	Amazing Grace 3: A Country Salute to Gospel	
"New Again"	2004	Brad Paisley	The Passion of the Christ: Original Songs Inspired by the Film	
"One's on the Way"	2005	none	Music from and Inspired by Desperate Housewives	
"Crackers"	2006	none	She Was Country When Country Wasn't Cool: A Tribute to Barbara Mandrell	
"Finder's Keepers"	2006	Pat Green	Cannonball	
"Never Alone"	2006	Jim Brickman	Escape	
"I'll Be Home for Christmas"	2007	none	Hear Something Country: Christmas 2007	
"Just a Closer Walk with Thee"	2008	none	How Great Thou Art: Gospel Favorites from the Grand Ole Opry	
"Low"	2008	none	Billy: The Early Years (soundtrack)	
"Silent Night"	2008	Elvis Presley	Christmas Duets	
"There Is a City"	2009	Bethany Olds	Glory Revealed II	
"Put My Heart Down"	2014	Will Chase	Nashville (season 3) – Put My Heart Down – Single	
"What a Fool Believes"	2014	The Doobie Brothers	Southbound	
"Trying to Find Atlantis"	2020	Jamie O'Neal	Sometimes	
"Did I Shave My Legs for This? (2021 Version)"	2021	Deana Carter; Terri Clark; Vince Gill; Ashley McBryde	Did I Shave My Legs for This? (25th Anniversary Edition)	
