= List of awards and nominations received by Sara Evans =

Sara Evans awards and nominations
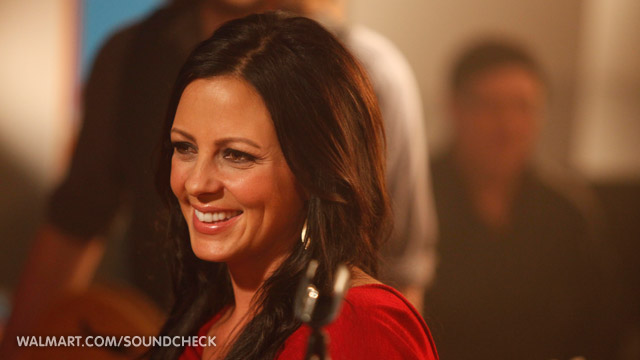
- Evans in 2011
Awards and nominations
Award	Wins	Nominations
Academy of Country Music Awards	1	10
Country Music Association Awards	1	15
American Music Awards	0	3

American country music artist Sara Evans has received more than six major industry awards and over 34 nominations. She received her first accolade from Billboard for Country Video of the Year for her single "Three Chords and the Truth". She received most of her award nominations from the Academy of Country Music and the Country Music Association. In 2001, Evans was nominated for five accolades from the Country Music Association. She would later win for Video of the Year for the single "Born to Fly". In later years she would be nominated for Female Vocalist of the Year several times. The Academy of Country Music nominated Evans for Top Female Vocalist (later called Female Vocalist of the Year) seven times. In 2005, she won the accolade. Evans has also received award nominations from the American Music Awards, American Country Awards and CMT Music Awards.

== Academy of Country Music Awards ==
Year	Nominee / work	Award	Result	Ref.
1997	Sara Evans	Top New Female Vocalist	Nominated	
1998	"No Place That Far"	Vocal Event of the Year (with Vince Gill)	Nominated	
2000	"That's the Beat of a Heart"	Vocal Event of the Year (with The Warren Brothers)	Nominated	
2000	Sara Evans	Top Female Vocalist	Nominated	
2001	Sara Evans	Top Female Vocalist	Nominated	
2003	Sara Evans	Top Female Vocalist of the Year	Nominated	
2004	Restless	Album of the Year	Nominated	
2004	Sara Evans	Top Female Vocalist	Nominated	
2005	Sara Evans	Top Female Vocalist	Won	
2006	Sara Evans	Top Female Vocalist	Nominated	
2011	Sara Evans	Female Vocalist of the Year	Nominated	

== American Country Awards ==
Year	Nominee / work	Award	Result	Ref.
2011	"A Little Bit Stronger"	Single of the Year, Female	Nominated	
2011	Sara Evans	Female Artist of the Year	Nominated	

== American Music Awards ==
Year	Nominee / work	Award	Result	Ref.
2000	Sara Evans	Favorite Country New Artist	Nominated	
2002	Sara Evans	Favorite Country Female Artist	Nominated	
2011	Sara Evans	Favorite Country Female Artist	Nominated	

== Billboard Awards ==
Year	Nominee / work	Award	Result	Ref.
1998	"Three Chords and the Truth"	Country Video of the Year	Won	

== BMI Country Awards ==
Year	Nominee / work	Award	Result	Ref.
2008	"As If"	50 Most Performed Country Songs	Won	

== CMT Music Awards ==
Year	Nominee / work	Award	Result	Ref.
2004	"Perfect"	Female Video of the Year	Nominated	
2005	"Suds in the Bucket"	Hottest Video of the Year	Nominated	
2006	"A Real Fine Place to Start"	Female Video of the Year	Nominated	
2007	"You'll Always Be My Baby"	Female Video of the Year	Nominated	
2011	"A Little Bit Stronger"	Female Video of the Year	Nominated	
2022	"Suds in the Bucket"	Comeback Song of the Year	Nominated	

== Country Music Association Awards ==
Year	Nominee / work	Award	Result	Ref.
1999	Sara Evans	Horizon Award	Nominated	
1999	"No Place That Far"	Vocal Event of the Year (with Vince Gill)	Nominated	
2000	Sara Evans	Horizon Award	Nominated	
2001	Born to Fly	Album of the Year	Nominated	
2001	Sara Evans	Female Vocalist of the Year	Nominated	
2001	"Born to Fly"	Music Video of the Year	Won	
2001	"Born to Fly"	Single of the Year	Nominated	
2001	"Born to Fly"	Song of the Year	Nominated	
2002	Sara Evans	Female Vocalist of the Year	Nominated	
2004	Sara Evans	Female Vocalist of the Year	Nominated	
2005	Sara Evans	Female Vocalist of the Year	Nominated	
2005	"New Again"	Vocal Event of the Year (with Brad Paisley)	Nominated	
2006	Sara Evans	Female Vocalist of the Year	Nominated	
2011	Sara Evans	Female Vocalist of the Year	Nominated	
2011	"A Little Bit Stronger"	Single of the Year	Nominated	

== Dove Awards ==
Year	Nominee / work	Award	Result	Ref.
2010	Glory Revealed II: The Word of God In Worship	Special Event Album	Won	

== Grand Ole Opry ==
Year	Nominee / work	Award	Result	Ref.
2023	Sara Evans	Inducted as a member of the Grand Ole Opry	Inducted	

== Radio & Records ==
Year	Nominee / work	Award	Result	Ref.
2006	Sara Evans	Reader's Poll – Female Vocalist of the Year	Won	
