= Playlist: The Very Best of Sara Evans =

Compilation album by Sara Evans
- Released: January 29, 2013
- Genre: Country
- Length: 59:31
- Label: Legacy, RCA Nashville
- Producer: Various

Sara Evans chronology
Stronger (2011)	Playlist: The Very Best of Sara Evans (2013)	Slow Me Down (2014)

Professional ratings
Review scores
Source	Rating
Allmusic	3.5/5 stars

Playlist: The Very Best of Sara Evans is the second compilation album from Sara Evans, after 2007's Greatest Hits, released as part of the Legacy Recordings Playlist series. The album features a selection of Evans' biggest hits, as well as album tracks and songs that have not previously been included on any of her albums.

== Track listing ==
No.	Title	Writer(s)	Original album	Length
1.	"Born to Fly"	Sara Evans, Marcus Hummon, Darrell Scott	Born to Fly	5:36
2.	"I Could Not Ask for More"	Diane Warren	Born to Fly	4:51
3.	"I Keep Looking"	Evans, Tom Shapiro, Tony Martin	Born to Fly	4:38
4.	"No Place That Far"	Evans, Martin, Shapiro	No Place That Far	3:39
5.	"You Don't"	Evans, Aimee Mayo, Ron Harbin	Born to Fly	5:11
6.	"A Real Fine Place to Start"	Radney Foster, George Ducas	Real Fine Place	4:00
7.	"Sweet By and By"	S. Fillmore Bennett, Joseph P. Webster	Amazing Grace 3: A Country Salute to Gospel	3:34
8.	"Three Chords and the Truth"	Evans, Harbin, Mayo	Three Chords and the Truth	3:59
9.	"Suds in the Bucket"	Billy Montana, Tammy Wagoner	Restless	3:49
10.	"Niagara"	Evans, Holly Lamar, Troy Verges, Gauch	Restless	5:34
11.	"Crackers"	Kye Fleming, Dennis Morgan	She Was Country When Country Wasn't Cool	3:44
12.	"Cheatin'"	Brett James, Don Schlitz	Real Fine Place	3:26
13.	"Never Alone" (with Jim Brickman)	Jim Brickman	Escape	3:46
14.	"Feels Just Like a Love Song"	Evans, Nathan Chapman, Chris Lindsey, Mayo		3:44
Total length:				59:31

== Chart performance ==
Chart (2013)	Peak position
US Billboard Top Country Albums	73
