= The Video Collection (Sara Evans video) =

Video by Sara Evans
- Released: September 19, 2006
- Recorded: 2000–2005
- Genre: Country; contemporary country
- Label: RCA Nashville

Sara Evans chronology
Real Fine Place (2005)	The Video Collection (2006)	Greatest Hits (2007)

The Video Collection is a video album by American country artist Sara Evans. It was released on September 19, 2006, via RCA Nashville and was issued as a DVD. It was Evans' first and only video album to date. The album included a collection of Evans' music videos during the 2000s.

== Background, content and release ==
The Video Collection contained six of Evans' music videos from her years at RCA Records. It includes videos of three of her number one hit singles: "Born to Fly" (2000), "Suds in the Bucket" (2004) and "A Real Fine Place to Start" (2005). The three remaining tracks were also singles and had previously reached the top ten of the Billboard Hot Country Songs chart: "I Could Not Ask for More" (2001), "Perfect" (2003) and "Cheatin'" (2005). Five of the album's music videos were directed by Peter Zavadil, with the exception of "Perfect", which was directed by Bobby G.

The album was released on September 19, 2006, via RCA Records, Evans' long-time label. The Video Collection was issued as a DVD video. To date it is Evans' only DVD release and her only video album. The album did not chart on any major Billboard publications following its release in 2006.

== Track listing ==
The track listing is derived from the liner notes of The Video Collection.

1. "Born to Fly"
2. "I Could Not Ask for More"
3. "Perfect"
4. "Suds in the Bucket"
5. "A Real Fine Place to Start"
6. "Cheatin'"

== Personnel ==
All credits are adapted from the album information from The Video Collection.

- Sara Evans – lead vocals
- Bobby G – director
- Peter Zavadil – director

== Release history ==
Region	Date	Format	Label	Ref.
United States	September 19, 2006	DVD	RCA Records	
