= New Again (disambiguation) =

New Again is an album and associated title track by Taking Back Sunday. The phrase may also refer to:

- "New Again" (song), a song by Kanye West from the album Donda
- "New Again", a song by American metalcore band Myka Relocate from the album The Young Souls
- "New Again", a song by Sara West from the album I'll Be Home for Christmas
