= At Christmas (Sara Evans album) =

Studio album by Sara Evans
- Released: November 17, 2014
- Recorded: 1999–2014
- Genre: Country; Christmas
- Label: RCA Nashville
- Producer: Mark Bright, Sara Evans, Patrick Leonard, John Shanks, Gordon Kennedy, Wayne Kirkpatrick, Buddy Cannon, Norro Wilson

Sara Evans chronology
Slow Me Down (2014)	At Christmas (2014)	Words (2017)

At Christmas is the eighth studio album and first full-length Christmas album by American country music artist Sara Evans. It was released on November 17, 2014 via RCA Nashville. The physical copy of the album was released exclusively through Walmart stores.

== Content ==
The album features a selection of well-known classic Christmas songs and one original song, the title track, written by Shane Stevens and Toby Lightman. "The Twelve Days of Christmas" features vocals from two of Evans' daughters, Olivia and Audrey. The final three tracks were recorded and released previously on various artist albums: "O Come All Ye Faithful" was featured on Country Christmas 1999, "Go Tell It on the Mountain" on Country Christmas 2001 and "I'll Be Home for Christmas" on Hear Something Country: Christmas 2007. The tracks were first compiled together for a digital EP release in 2009, entitled I'll Be Home for Christmas.

== Track listing ==
No.	Title	Writer(s)	Length
1.	"At Christmas"	Shane Stevens, Toby Lightman	2:54
2.	"Have Yourself a Merry Little Christmas"	Hugh Martin, Ralph Blane	3:23
3.	"The Twelve Days of Christmas" (featuring Olivia & Audrey)	Traditional	4:25
4.	"Silent Night"	Franz Xaver Gruber, Joseph Mohr	4:54
5.	"Winter Wonderland"	Felix Bernard, Richard B. Smith	2:36
6.	"O Holy Night"	Adolphe Adam, John Sullivan Dwight	4:54
7.	"Run Rudolph Run"	Johnny Marks, Marvin Brodie	3:24
8.	"I'll Be Home for Christmas"	Kim Gannon, Walter Kent	3:54
9.	"Go Tell It on the Mountain"	Traditional	3:48
10.	"O Come All Ye Faithful"	John Francis Wade, Frederick Oakeley	4:47

== Personnel ==
- Sara Evans - lead vocals
- Audrey Evans - vocals (3)
- Olivia Evans - vocals (3)
- Dan Dugmore - acoustic guitar, pedal steel guitar
- B. James Lowry - acoustic guitar
- Dean Parks - acoustic guitar
- Danny Rader - acoustic guitar
- Ilya Toshinskiy - acoustic guitar
- Jimmy Nichols - Hammond B-3 organ, harpsichord, synth pad, synth strings, Wurlitzer organ, keyboards, piano
- Larry Paxton - bass
- John Shanks - bass, guitar
- Jimmie Lee - bass
- Eddie Bayers, Jr. - drums
- Chris McHugh - drums
- Greg Morrow - drums
- J.T. Corenflos - electric guitar
- Kenny Greenberg - electric guitar
- Jerry McPherson - electric guitar
- Larry Franklin - fiddle
- Audrey Haynie - fiddle
- Jennifer Wrinkle - fiddle, background vocals
- Davey Spillane - flute, Illiad pipes
- Patrick Leonard - keyboards, piano
- Jamie Muhoberac - keyboards
- Eric Darken - percussion
- Jeff Rothschild - programming
- Sonny Garrish - steel guitar
- John Hobbs - synthesizer
- Randy McCormick - synthesizer
- Perry Coleman - background vocals
- Gordon Kennedy - background vocals
- Kim Keyes - background vocals
- Wayne Kirkpatrick - background vocals
- Melodie Crittenden - background vocals
- Louis Nunley - background vocals
- John Wesley Ryles - background vocals
- Russell Terrell - background vocals
- Dennis Wilson - background vocals

== Charts ==
Chart (2014)	Peak position
US Billboard 200	135
US Top Country Albums (Billboard)	21
US Top Holiday Albums (Billboard)	34
