= Some Things Never Change (disambiguation) =

Some Things Never Change (1997) is the album by the English rock band Supertramp.

Some Things Never Change may also refer to:

- "Some Things Never Change", (1988) a song from album Total Devo by American new wave band Devo,
- "Some Things Never Change" (Tim McGraw song) (2000)
- "Some Things Never Change" (Sara Evans song) (2008)
- "Some Things Never Change" (Dallas Smith song) (2020)
- "Some Things Never Change" (2019), a song from the Disney film Frozen II
