= Slow Me Down =

Studio album by Sara Evans
- Released: March 11, 2014
- Recorded: 2012–13
- Genres: Country; country pop
- Length: 38:12
- Label: RCA Nashville
- Producers: Mark Bright; Sara Evans

Sara Evans chronology
Playlist: The Very Best of Sara Evans (2013)	Slow Me Down (2014)	At Christmas (2014)

Singles from Slow Me Down
- 1. "Slow Me Down" Released: September 23, 2013; 2. "Put My Heart Down" Released: September 29, 2014

Slow Me Down is the seventh studio album by American country music artist Sara Evans, released in 2014 by RCA Nashville.

== Content ==
Evans co-wrote three of the album's eleven tracks and co-produced the record with Mark Bright, whom she previously worked with on 2005's Real Fine Place. The album includes a cover of Gavin DeGraw's "Not Over You," with him providing harmony vocals, and a duet with Isaac Slade of The Fray on "Can't Stop Loving You." Vince Gill, who last collaborated with Evans on her 1998 No. 1 hit "No Place That Far," sings harmony vocals on "Better Off." "Revival" was previously recorded under the title "A Little Revival" by one of its co-writers, Radney Foster ("A Real Fine Place to Start"), on his 2009 album, Revival.

The album's title track, "Slow Me Down," was released as the album's lead-off single on September 23, 2013. It debuted at #57 on the U.S. Billboard Country Airplay chart for the week of September 14, 2013, and ultimately reached a peak of number 17 in April 2014.

The second single was announced to be "Can't Stop Loving You" with a release date of July 21, 2014. For unknown reasons however, the release was pushed back to August 25, 2014 and then later cancelled completely with "Put My Heart Down" announced as the next single instead. "Put My Heart Down" was released on September 29, 2014. It debuted at number 60 on the U.S. Billboard Country Airplay chart for the week of November 8, 2014, and ultimately reached a peak of number 57, only spending four weeks on the chart. Evans appeared on ABC's Nashville to perform a duet version of "Put My Heart Down" with Will Chase (who plays Luke Wheeler on the show) on October 29, 2014.

== Critical reception ==
Professional ratings
Aggregate scores
Source	Rating
Metacritic	87/100
Review scores
Source	Rating
AllMusic	4/5 stars
Billboard	91/100
Country Weekly	A
Got Country Online	5/5 stars
The Oakland Press	3/4 stars
Roughstock	3/5 stars
USA Today	3/4 stars

Slow Me Down garnered acclaim from music critics. At Metacritic, the album has a Metascore of 87, indicating "universal acclaim". Erik Ernst of the Milwaukee Journal Sentinel gave a positive review, saying that the album "is a mostly joyful affair that finds the singer even more confident as she explores the many sides of love" on which "She's been there and has come out singing better than ever on the other side." At The Boston Globe, Sarah Rodman gave a positive review, stating that the release is better than her predecessor, and she says "the tracks that stand out have a fresh appeal." Jon Caramanica of The New York Times gave a positive review, and writes that Evans "robust and sweet voice" are what sets the album apart because "She sings with power, grace and dignity.". At USA Today, Brian Mansfield rated the album three out of four stars, stating that "In songs spanning soaring pop and stone country, Evans recounts all the ways to walk away, though she'd rather be convinced to stay", and the likes of "Gavin DeGraw, Vince Gill and Isaac Slade beckon her back." Stephen Thomas Erlewine of AllMusic rated the album four stars out of five, writing that "fans hoping that Evans will return to country music will be disappointed, but Slow Me Down is something that is rare in 2014: an unapologetic, big-scale adult pop album, constructed with grace and care." At The Oakland Press, Gary Graff rated the album three stars out of four, saying that Evans is "in fine voice and solid country-pop crossover form" on which "Evans isn’t about to be slowed down any time soon." Chuck Dauphin of Billboard rated the album a 91-out-of-100, stating that the album is spectacular making it hard to select a few highlight tracks. At Country Weekly, Tammy Ragusa graded the album an A, writing that "she has found what works best for her on the contemporary side and front-loads the project with those songs." At Got Country Online, Donna Block rated the album a perfect five stars, and according to her "Every single beat is felt, head to toe. It’s quite a feat to balance ever-changing feelings in a song, let alone throughout an album", and it shows just how Evans "maintains a vocal equilibrium from song to song" on the release. Dan MacIntosh of Roughstock rated the album three stars out of five, writing that Evans plays around with many styles on the album, but advises her "a beautiful, natural singing voice is a terrible thing to waste."

== Commercial performance ==
Slow Me Down debuted at number nine on the U.S. Billboard 200, and at number two on the U.S. Billboard Top Country Albums chart selling 27,000 copies in its first week of release. The album has sold 87,000 copies in the US as of August 2014.

== Track listing ==
No.	Title	Writer(s)	Length
1.	"Slow Me Down"	Marv Green, Heather Morgan, Jimmy Robbins	3:15
2.	"Not Over You" (featuring Gavin DeGraw)	Gavin DeGraw, Ryan Tedder	3:52
3.	"Put My Heart Down"	Nathan Chapman, Andrew Dorff, Liz Huett	3:16
4.	"Can't Stop Loving You" (duet with Isaac Slade of The Fray)	Victoria Banks, Phil Barton, Emily Shackleton	3:35
5.	"You Never Know"	Sara Evans, Shane McAnally, Josh Osborne	3:59
6.	"If I Run"	Evans, Karyn Rochelle, Shane Stevens	3:33
7.	"Sweet Spot"	Evans, Rochelle, Stevens	3:02
8.	"Good Love Is Hard to Find"	Dave Berg, busbee, Sarah Buxton	3:33
9.	"Better Off" (featuring Vince Gill)	Marla Cannon-Goodman, Rochelle	4:01
10.	"Gotta Have You"	Banks, Barton, Shackleton	3:25
11.	"Revival"	Darrell Brown, Jay Clementi, Radney Foster	4:01
Total length:			38:12

== Personnel ==
- Sara Evans – lead vocals, backing vocals
- Jimmy Nichols – keyboards, accordion
- Charlie Judge – synthesizers
- Kenny Greenberg – electric guitars
- Jerry McPherson – electric guitars
- Ilya Toshinsky – acoustic guitars, banjo, dobro
- Aubrey Haynie – fiddle, mandolin
- Jimmie Lee Sloas – bass
- Chris McHugh – drums
- Greg Morrow – drums
- Eric Darken – percussion
- Shane Stevens – whistle
- Bob Bailey – backing vocals
- Perry Coleman – backing vocals
- Vicki Hampton – backing vocals
- Jenifer Wrinkle – backing vocals
- Gavin Degraw – lead vocals on "Not Over You"
- Isaac Slade – lead vocals on "Can't Stop Loving You"
- Vince Gill – harmony vocals on "Better Off"

== Production ==
- Mark Bright – producer
- Sara Evans – producer
- Derek Bason – recording, digital editing
- Ben Fowler – recording, mixing, digital editing
- Todd Tidwell – recording
- Chris Ashburn – recording assistant
- Chris Small – recording assistant
- Matt Rausch – additional recording
- Trey Keller – digital editing
- Brian David Willis – digital editing
- Adam Ayan – mastering
- Mike "Frog" Griffith – production coordinator
- Kristin Wines – production assistant
- Robert Ascroft – photography
- Kaelin Evans – hair, make-up, styling
- Alex Stone – glam assistant
- The Collective Nashville – management

Studios

- Recorded at Blackbird Studio and Starstruck Studios (Nashville, Tennessee).
- Additional recording at The House (Nashville, Tennessee).
- Mixed at Hillywood Studios (Nashville, Tennessee).
- Mastered at Gateway Mastering (Portland, Maine).

== Chart performance ==
=== Weekly charts ===
Chart (2014)	Peak position
UK Country Albums (Official Charts)	3
US Billboard 200	9
US Top Country Albums (Billboard)	2

=== Year-end charts ===
Chart (2014)	Position
US Top Country Albums (Billboard)	51

=== Singles ===
Year	Single	Peak chart positions			
Year	Single	US Country	US Country Airplay	US	CAN Country
2013	"Slow Me Down"	19	17	89	33
2014	"Put My Heart Down"	—	57	—	—
"—" denotes releases that did not chart
