= A Little Bit Stronger =

Single by Sara Evans

from the album Stronger and Country Strong (soundtrack)
- Released: September 27, 2010
- Recorded: 2010
- Genre: Country
- Length: 4:18 (radio edit); 5:04 (album version)
- Label: RCA Nashville
- Songwriters: Luke Laird, Hillary Lindsey, Hillary Scott
- Producer: Tony Brown

Music video
- "A Little Bit Stronger" on YouTube

Sara Evans singles chronology
"Feels Just Like a Love Song" (2009)	"A Little Bit Stronger" (2010)	"My Heart Can't Tell You No" (2011)

Country Strong singles chronology
"Country Strong" (2010)	"A Little Bit Stronger" (2010)	"Me and Tennessee" (2011)

"A Little Bit Stronger" is a song written by Luke Laird, Hillary Lindsey, and Hillary Scott and recorded by American country music artist Sara Evans. It was released in September 2010 and as the first single from Evans' 2011 album Stronger. The song was also included on the soundtrack for the 2010 movie Country Strong and released as the second single from the film's soundtrack album. The song became Evans' fifth and final number one hit on the US Billboard Hot Country Songs chart in May 2011. It is also her first single to be certified Platinum by the RIAA.

Evans performed the song on April 3, 2011 during the 2011 Academy of Country Music Awards, and received a standing ovation for her performance. She also performed the song on May 24, 2011, during the finale of the twelfth season of Dancing with the Stars.

== Content ==
"A Little Bit Stronger" is a mid-tempo country ballad, backed by mandolin, steel guitar, piano, and percussion. The song's female narrator describes going through her daily routine and being constantly reminded of her former love interest ("I turned on the radio / Stupid song made me think of you"). However, she copes with the pain ("I listened to it for a minute / But then I changed it"), assuring herself that each time she pushes his memory away, she gets "a little bit stronger."

Evans debuted the new single during her 2010 fanclub party on June 10, 2010. The song was written by Luke Laird, Hillary Lindsey, Hillary Scott of Lady Antebellum, the latter of whom also performed harmony vocals on the record. The lyrics were inspired by a real-life experience from Scott, who had just dealt with a break up with a loved one.

== Critical reception ==
Blake Boldt of Engine 145 gave the song a "thumbs up" rating, complimenting the song's "flourishes of steel and piano" and the "authentic, organic vocal." Matt Bjorke of Roughstock gave the song 4 stars out of 5, complimenting the song's lighter production and Evans' vocals, which he felt "wring every bit of emotion out of the lyrics that chronicle a woman's ability to move on after a long relationship ends." Kevin John Coyne of Country Universe gave the song a C grade, stating that the song could have been better "with a stronger melody and a more refined concept." He also compared it unfavorably to Evans’ previous singles, "Fool, I'm a Woman," "Cheatin'," and "Shame About That."

== Other versions ==
The song was also recorded by Leighton Meester for the film Country Strong and is included on the soundtrack album Country Strong: More Music From the Motion Picture. Danielle Bradbery, the eventual winner of season four of The Voice, covered the song during the quarter-finals. Her version reached number 31 on the US Billboard Hot Country Songs chart.

On her 2017 album Words, Evans recorded an acoustic version of the song at NightBird Recording Studios in West Hollywood, California.

== Music video ==
The music video, directed by Peter Zavadil, was shot on August 9, 2010 in Nashville, Tennessee, and premiered on CMT's Big New Music Weekend on October 1, 2010. In the video, Evans is shown in various locations within her spacious apartment and sitting behind the wheel of a car in the rain, appearing distraught while she performs the song. Throughout the video, scenes of her recording a video blog are included. As the video progresses, Evans makes note in her video blog that she's been getting stronger with each passing day.

The video was nominated in Female Video of the Year category at the 2011 CMT Music Awards.

== Chart performance ==
"A Little Bit Stronger" debuted at #56 on the U.S. Billboard Hot Country Songs chart for the week of October 2, 2010. It also debuted on the U.S. Billboard Hot 100 at #98 for the week of January 15, 2011. It became her fifth (and to date, final) number one hit on the U.S. Billboard Hot Country Songs chart for the week dated May 14, 2011, and her first number one hit since "A Real Fine Place to Start" in September–October 2005.

=== Weekly charts ===
Chart (2010–2011)	Peak position
Canada Hot 100 (Billboard)	75
Canada Country (Billboard)	6
US Billboard Hot 100	34
US Hot Country Songs (Billboard)	1

=== Year-end charts ===
Chart (2011)	Position
US Country Songs (Billboard)	21

=== Decade-end charts ===
Chart (2010–2019)	Position
US Hot Country Songs (Billboard)	42

== Certifications ==
Region	Certification
United States (RIAA)	Platinum
