= Greatest Hits (Sara Evans album) =

Greatest hits album by Sara Evans
- Released: October 9, 2007
- Recorded: 1998–2007
- Genre: Country
- Length: 58:04
- Label: RCA Nashville
- Producer: Various

Sara Evans chronology
The Video Collection (2006)	Greatest Hits (2007)	Stronger (2011)

Singles from Greatest Hits
- 1. "As If" Released: June 1, 2007; 2. "Some Things Never Change" Released: February 2, 2008; 3. "Love You with All My Heart" Released: June 23, 2008

Professional ratings
Review scores
Source	Rating
AllMusic	3/5 stars

Greatest Hits is a 2007 compilation album by American country music singer Sara Evans. It features ten of her greatest hits from her second through fifth albums, as well as four newly recorded tracks.

== Content ==
Greatest Hits chronicles the highest-peaking singles from Evans' second through fifth studio albums: 1998's No Place That Far, 2000's Born to Fly, 2003's Restless, and 2005's Real Fine Place. All of the selections from these albums reached the Top 20 or higher on the US Billboard Hot Country Songs charts. No tracks are included from her 1997 debut album Three Chords and the Truth, which did not produce any Top 40 country hits. Among the previously released tracks are her first four number one hits: 1999's "No Place That Far", 2001's "Born to Fly", 2004's "Suds in the Bucket", and 2005's "A Real Fine Place to Start".

In addition to the previously released tracks, Greatest Hits includes four previously unreleased tracks: "As If", "Love You with All My Heart", "Pray for You", and "Some Things Never Change". In mid-2007, "As If" was released as the first single from this album, and it peaked at number 11 on the country charts. "Some Things Never Change" was released in early 2008 as the second single. This song reached number 26 on the country charts. "Love You with All My Heart," the third single, failed to chart after its release on June 23, 2008.

== Promotion ==
Evans promoted this album with her The Greatest tour from late 2007 through late 2008.

== Track listing ==
No.	Title	Writer(s)	Original album	Length
1.	"As If"	Sara Evans; Hillary Lindsey; John Shanks	New recording	3:30
2.	"Born to Fly"	S. Evans; Marcus Hummon; Darrell Scott	Born to Fly	5:36
3.	"I Could Not Ask for More"	Diane Warren	Born to Fly	4:47
4.	"Perfect"	S. Evans; Tom Shapiro; Tony Martin	Restless	4:02
5.	"Cheatin'"	Brett James; Don Schlitz	Real Fine Place	3:25
6.	"Suds in the Bucket"	Billy Montana; Tammy "Jenai" Wagoner	Restless	3:49
7.	"Saints & Angels"	Victoria Banks	Born to Fly	4:25
8.	"You'll Always Be My Baby"	S. Evans; Martin; Shapiro	Real Fine Place	4:36
9.	"I Keep Looking"	S. Evans; Shapiro; Martin	Born to Fly	4:36
10.	"No Place That Far"	S. Evans; Martin; Shapiro	No Place That Far	3:37
11.	"A Real Fine Place to Start"	Radney Foster; George Ducas	Real Fine Place	3:58
12.	"Love You with All My Heart"	S. Evans; Aimee Mayo; Shanks	New recording	4:00
13.	"Pray for You"	S. Evans; Mayo; Shanks	New recording	3:34
14.	"Some Things Never Change"	S. Evans; Matt Evans; Lindsey; Shanks	New recording	4:09
Total length:				58:04

== Personnel on new tracks ==
- Paul Bushnell - bass guitar
- Dan Dugmore - pedal steel guitar
- Matt Evans - background vocals
- Sara Evans - lead vocals, background vocals
- Vince Gill - background vocals
- Charlie Judge - keyboards, Hammond organ, piano, programming
- Abe Laboriel Jr. - drums
- Hillary Lindsey - background vocals
- Chris McHugh - drums
- Jeff Rothchild - drums, programming
- John Shanks - bass guitar, acoustic guitar, electric guitar, piano, background vocals
- Ashley Evans Simpson - background vocals
- Jonathan Yudkin - banjo, upright bass, cello, fiddle, harmonium, mandolin, viola, violin

== Chart performance ==
=== Weekly charts ===
Chart (2007)	Peak position
US Billboard 200	8
US Top Country Albums (Billboard)	3

=== Year-end charts ===
Chart (2007)	Position
US Top Country Albums (Billboard)	63
Chart (2008)	Position
US Top Country Albums (Billboard)	38

=== Singles ===
Year	Single	Peak chart positions			
Year	Single	US Country	US	US Pop	CAN
2007	"As If"	11	62	74	81
2008	"Some Things Never Change"	26	—	—	—
2008	"Love You with All My Heart"	—	—	—	—
"—" denotes releases that did not chart

== Certifications ==
Region	Certification
United States (RIAA)	Gold
