= Stronger (Sara Evans album) =

Studio album by Sara Evans
- Released: March 8, 2011
- Recorded: 2009–2010
- Genre: Country
- Length: 39:44
- Label: RCA Nashville
- Producer: Nathan Chapman and Sara Evans (1, 4, 6 & 8); Tony Brown (2, 3, 5, 7 & 10); Marti Frederiksen (9)

Sara Evans chronology
Greatest Hits (2007)	Stronger (2011)	Playlist: The Very Best of Sara Evans (2013)

Singles from Stronger
- 1. "A Little Bit Stronger" Released: September 27, 2010; 2. "My Heart Can't Tell You No" Released: June 20, 2011; 3. "Anywhere" Released: July 23, 2012

Stronger is the sixth studio album by American country music artist Sara Evans. It was released on March 8, 2011, via RCA Records Nashville. Her first since 2005's Real Fine Place, the album came after a divorce from her now ex-husband Craig Schelske. Initially set to be released in 2009, the album was delayed due to the divorce. Evans was heavily involved in the writing for the album, co-writing seven of the eleven tracks. She co-produced the album with Nathan Chapman, Tony Brown, and Marti Frederiksen.

"Feels Just Like a Love Song" was originally the lead single from the album, released in August 2009. But after only spending a single week at number 59 on the Hot Country Songs chart, Evans's label, RCA Nashville Records, pulled it from radio and delayed the album; the song was later not included on the record. The album's official lead single, "A Little Bit Stronger", became one of Evans's biggest hits, becoming her first country number one hit since "A Real Fine Place to Start" (2005), spending two weeks atop the charts. The album also spawned two more minor hits: the top-thirty hit "My Heart Can't Tell You No" and "Anywhere". Also, a bluegrass version of her second number one hit "Born to Fly".

== Background ==
Stronger is Evans' first studio album to be released in nearly six years. During this six-year period, Evans was involved in a high-profile divorce from her now ex-husband Craig Schelske. In an interview with CMT, Evans explained why she took so long to record the record saying, "I cannot be creative unless my world is right. A lot of people will say, 'You know when I was going through my divorce or when I was going through rehab or when I was going through whatever ... .' You always hear artists talk about, 'Those are the best songs I've written.' Like, I'm the total opposite".

In an interview with "The Boot", Evans spoke highly of the record saying, "I am so excited and thrilled to finally have NEW music coming out! It took me a long time to make this record for many reasons, both personally and professionally, and now it's all about to come to fruition. This new album is full of fresh new sounds from me, and many songs that I co-wrote, but it's also the signature Sara Evans sound that I hope will make the fans want to buy this record!" Also included is a song titled "Alone", and Evans has stated that she wants it released as the third single from the album, saying "There's a song called 'Alone' that is going to be the third single. It's a very country ballad, but I'm telling you, that song ... I have such high hopes that this song can really change my career".

"My Heart Can't Tell You No" was originally recorded by Rod Stewart on his 1988 album, Out of Order.

== Reception ==
=== Commercial ===
The album debuted at number six on the U.S. Billboard 200, and at number one on the U.S. Billboard Top Country Albums chart selling 55,000 copies in its first week of release. As of January 2014, the album has sold 405,000 copies in the US.

=== Critical ===
Professional ratings
Review scores
Source	Rating
Allmusic	3/5 stars
Associated Press	(mixed)
Billboard	(positive)
Country Weekly	3.5/5 stars
Entertainment Weekly	(B)
The New York Times	(positive)
Roughstock	3/5 stars
The Washington Post	(positive)

Upon its release, Stronger received generally positive reviews from most music critics. At Metacritic, which assigns a normalized rating out of 100 to reviews from mainstream critics, the album received an average score of 74, based on 5 reviews, which indicates "generally favorable reviews".

Jon Caramanica with The New York Times referred to the album as "modest" and "sharp" calling Evans an "unjustly underappreciated country singer who’s becoming more assured as she gets older". Thom Jurek with Allmusic gave the release a three star rating, noting the "traditional country" sound of the album; but also calling the release "formulaic" saying "Evans' fans will eat this up as welcome return to form. However, a more critical listen will reveal this set as a concession to Nashville's ever more restrictive, formulaic studio system". Matt Bjorke with Roughstock gave it a three star rating, saying it "features a strong mix of contemporary country music; Stronger is an album that Sara Evans fans have been longing to have. Deborah Evans Price with Billboard gave it a favorable review, stating "Stronger, Sara Evans' first studio album in six years, is proof that some things are worth waiting for."

Jessica Phillips with Country Weekly gave it a 3½ star rating, calling the track "What That Drink Cost Me" "the album’s standout ballad" and compared Evans to Trisha Yearwood and Patty Loveless. Bill Friskics-Warren with The Washington Post gave it a favorable review, also comparing her voice to that of Patty Loveless. Michael McCall with the Associated Press gave the release a mixed review, saying "the anthemic songs fall flat: On the fist-pumping "A Little Bit Stronger" and the spiritually inclined "Desperately," Evans sounds oddly detached and the arrangements sound overly dramatic" but called the track "Alone" "the album's most powerful ballad".

== Singles ==
"A Little Bit Stronger" was released as the album's first single on September 27, 2010. It became Evans' fifth number one hit on the U.S. Billboard Hot Country Songs chart and her first since "A Real Fine Place to Start" in October 2005. The album's second single "My Heart Can't Tell You No", was released on June 20, 2011, and peaked at number 21 in January 2012. "Anywhere," the third single, was released on July 23, 2012.

== Track listing ==
No.	Title	Writer(s)	Length
1.	"Desperately"	Sara Evans, Marcus Hummon	3:13
2.	"A Little Bit Stronger"	Luke Laird, Hillary Lindsey, Hillary Scott	5:04
3.	"My Heart Can't Tell You No"	Simon Climie, Dennis Morgan	4:33
4.	"Anywhere"	Matt Evans, Jaren Johnston	4:06
5.	"Alone"	Brian Henningsen, Aaron Henningsen	3:25
6.	"Ticket to Ride"	S. Evans, Leslie Satcher	4:22
7.	"Life Without Losing"	S. Evans, Barry Dean, Andrew Dorff, Laird	3:42
8.	"What That Drink Cost Me"	S. Evans, M. Evans, Nathan Chapman	4:00
9.	"Wildfire"	S. Evans, M. Evans, Kara DioGuardi, Marti Frederiksen	3:38
10.	"Born to Fly" (Bluegrass version)	S. Evans, Hummon, Darrell Scott	3:36
11.	"Cabana Boy" (iTunes bonus track)	S. Evans, M. Evans, Chapman	3:22
Total length:			39:44

== Personnel ==
Production and Technical

- Renée Bell – A&R direction
- Sara Evans – producer (1, 4, 6, 8)
- Nathan Chapman – producer (1, 4, 6, 8)
- Matt Evans – associate producer (1, 4, 6, 8)
- Tony Brown – producer (2, 3, 5, 7, 10)
- Marti Frederiksen – producer (9), recording (9), vocal overdubs (9)
- Clarke Schleicher – mixing, recording (1, 4, 6, 8), vocal overdub assistant (1, 4, 6, 8)
- Jeff Balding – vocal overdubs (1, 4, 6, 8, 9), recording (2, 3, 5, 7, 10)
- Justin Niebank – mixing (1, 4, 6, 8)
- Andrew Bazinet – mix assistant (1–8, 10)
- Drew Bollman – mix assistant (1, 4, 6, 8)
- Lane McGiboney – vocal overdub assistant (1, 4, 6, 8, 9)
- Shawn Daugherty – recording assistant (1, 4, 6, 8)
- Todd Tidwell – recording assistant (1, 4, 6, 8), additional recording and engineering (1, 4, 6, 8)
- Leland Elliott – additional recording and engineering (1, 4, 6, 8)
- P.J. Fenech – additional recording and engineering (1, 4, 6, 8), mix assistant (2, 3, 5, 7, 9, 10)
- Kyle Ford – additional recording and engineering (1, 4, 6, 8)
- Jason Kyle – additional recording and engineering (1, 4, 6, 8)
- Matt Legge – additional recording and engineering (1, 4, 6, 8)
- Dave Matthews – additional recording and engineering (1, 4, 6, 8)
- Mark Petaccia – additional recording and engineering (1, 4, 6, 8)
- Scott Velazco – additional recording and engineering (1, 4, 6, 8)
- Taylor Pollert – recording assistant (2, 3, 5, 7, 10)
- Lowell Reynolds – recording assistant (2, 3, 5, 7, 10), mix assistant (2, 3, 5, 7, 10)
- Brian David Willis – digital editing (2, 3, 5, 7, 10)
- Mickey Jack Cones – vocal digital editing (9)
- Andrew Mendelson – mastering
- Jason Campbell – production coordinator (1, 4, 6, 8)
- Amy Garges – production coordinator (2, 3, 5, 7, 10)
- Judy Forde-Blair – creative producer, album notes
- Scott McDaniel – creative director
- Tracy Baskette-Fleaner – art direction, package design
- Russ Harrington – photography
- Tammie Harris Cleek – imaging, photo production
- Kaelin Evans – wardrobe stylist
- Colleen Runne – hair stylist, make-up

Vocals and Musicians

- Sara Evans – lead vocals, backing vocals
- John Barlow Jarvis – acoustic piano, Wurlitzer electric piano
- Tony Harrell – Wurlitzer electric piano, Hammond B3 organ
- Steve Nathan – Hammond B3 organ, synthesizers
- Marti Frederiksen – Hammond B3 organ, acoustic guitar, electric guitar, bass, drums, percussion, backing vocals
- Tom Bukovac – acoustic guitar, electric guitar
- Kenny Greenberg – acoustic guitar, electric guitar
- Nathan Chapman – acoustic guitar, electric guitar, backing vocals
- Marcus Hummon – acoustic guitar, backing vocals
- Brent Mason – electric guitar
- Bryan Sutton – acoustic guitar, banjo
- Darrell Scott – banjo, backing vocals
- Jerry Douglas – dobro
- Dan Dugmore – dobro, steel guitar
- Aubrey Haynie – fiddle, mandolin
- Jimmie Lee Sloas – bass
- Glenn Worf – bass
- Matt Chamberlain – drums, percussion
- Greg Morrow – drums
- Eric Darken – percussion
- Stephanie Chapman – backing vocals
- Perry Coleman – backing vocals
- Kara DioGuardi – backing vocals
- Lesley Lyons – backing vocals
- Hillary Scott – backing vocals
- Ashley Evans-Simpson – backing vocals

== Charts ==
=== Weekly charts ===
Chart (2011)	Peak position
UK Country Albums (OCC)	4
US Billboard 200	6
US Top Country Albums (Billboard)	1

=== Year-end charts ===
Chart (2011)	Position
US Billboard 200	99
US Top Country Albums (Billboard)	23

Chart (2012)	Position
US Top Country Albums (Billboard)	53

=== Singles ===
Year	Single	Peak chart positions		
Year	Single	US Country	US	CAN
2010	"A Little Bit Stronger"	1	34	75
2011	"My Heart Can't Tell You No"^{A}	21	105	—
2012	"Anywhere"	53	—	—
"—" denotes releases that did not chart

- ^{A}Did not enter the Hot 100 but charted on Bubbling Under Hot 100 Singles.

== Certifications ==
Region	Certification	Certified units/sales
United States (RIAA)	Gold	500,000^{‡}
^{‡} Sales+streaming figures based on certification alone.
