= I'll Be Home for Christmas (EP) =

EP by Sara Evans
- Released: November 3, 2009
- Genre: Country; Christmas
- Label: RCA Nashville

Sara Evans chronology
Greatest Hits (2008)	I'll Be Home for Christmas (2009)	Stronger (2011)

I'll Be Home for Christmas is an extended play released by American country artist Sara Evans. The project was released on November 3, 2009 via RCA Records Nashville. It was Evans's first EP release and first collection of holiday music. It was released through digital retailers at the time, including iTunes.

== Content and promotion ==
In October 2009, Evans announced the release of a holiday-themed project. The record coincided with her Christmas tour that fall called "Celebrate the Season". The tour ran for several years in which she promoted her holiday EP through RCA Nashville.

The extended play consisted of four tracks, including "Go Tell It on the Mountain" and "New Again", a duet with country artist Brad Paisley. Following the album's release, Evans began her "Celebrate the Season Tour", which consisted of two sets. The first set featured Evans performing songs from her holiday collection while the second set featured some of her biggest hits.

== Track listing ==
I'll Be Home for Christmas
No.	Title	Writer(s)	Length
1.	"I'll Be Home for Christmas"	Kim Gannon; Walter Kent	3:53
2.	"O Come All Ye Faithful"	John Francis Wade; Frederick Oakeley	4:47
3.	"Go Tell It on the Mountain"	Traditional	4:30
4.	"New Again" (with Brad Paisley)	Sara Evans; Brad Paisley	6:22

== Release history ==
Region	Date	Format	Label	Ref.
United States	November 3, 2009	digital download	RCA Nashville	
