= Feels Just Like a Love Song =

Single by Sara Evans
- Released: July 20, 2009
- Recorded: 2009
- Genre: Country
- Length: 3:18 (radio edit); 3:44 (album version)
- Label: RCA Nashville
- Songwriters: Nathan Chapman; Sara Evans; Chris Lindsey; Aimee Mayo
- Producers: Nathan Chapman; Sara Evans

Sara Evans singles chronology
"Low" (2008)	"Feels Just Like a Love Song" (2009)	"A Little Bit Stronger" (2010)

"Feels Just Like a Love Song" is a song co-written and recorded by American country artist Sara Evans. It was released to country radio in July 2009, and as a digital download on August 18, 2009. "Feels Just Like a Love Song" is the twenty-third single release of Evans' career.

"Feels Just Like a Love Song" was originally intended as the lead-off single to her sixth studio album, Stronger, but the single was pulled from radio shortly after release and the album was delayed. The track was then subsequently cut from the final track listing of the record, which was released on March 8, 2011. However, it was included on the 2013 compilation album, Playlist: The Very Best of Sara Evans.

== Content ==
"Feels Just Like a Love Song" is an up-tempo country pop song, featuring banjo and electric guitar. The narrator speaks of having a picture-perfect life with the love of her life, and that it all "feels just like a love song."

The song, co-written by Sara Evans with Nathan Chapman, Chris Lindsey, and Aimee Mayo, is in reference to her life after her marriage to Jay Barker. "I'm in a place writing this album that I've never been before, ever. You can totally see that and hear that in my voice. I've never been married to Jay Barker and written an album before, and it shows."

Evans announced the single's release at her annual fan club party at Rocketown in Nashville, Tennessee, and followed the announcement with a live performance. On June 25, 2009, the entire song and its cover art were officially released on Evans' MySpace for public listening.

== Reception ==
The song has been met with mixed reviews from critics. Kevin J. Coyne of Country Universe gave the song a B− grade, saying, "She sings the fire out of a fairly decent pop-country song here, but the arrangement is an overwhelming distraction, with far too much clutter in the mix. It’s to her credit as a vocalist that she’s not drowned out completely, but she’s ill-served by the production philosophy that bigger is better." Bobby Peacock of Roughstock considered the song a "solid comeback" and compared it to one of her previous singles, "Some Things Never Change", saying, "it's not a particularly inspired lyric, but at the same time, it's far from the cringingly clichéd mess that it could have been. It's greatly elevated by Evans' consistently strong, twangy voice[.]" Karlie Justus of Engine 145 gave the song a thumbs down rating, saying, "Despite starting with a catchy Swift–like beat (the teen queen’s producer Nathan Chapman lends his services here), the tune quickly delves into a mishmash of beats fit for a Top 40 dance floor number[…]the cacophonous and confusing chorus drowns her in a sea of backup singers and instruments." She also considered the lyrics generic and disjointed.

== Chart performance ==
"Feels Just Like a Love Song" debuted at number 59 on the U.S. Billboard Hot Country Songs chart for the week of August 15, 2009.

Chart (2009)	Peak position
US Hot Country Songs (Billboard)	59
