= Amazing Grace 3: A Country Salute to Gospel =

Compilation album by various artists
- Released: June 15, 2004
- Genre: Country
- Length: 42:35
- Label: Sparrow

Professional ratings
Review scores
Source	Rating
AllMusic	2.5/5 stars

Amazing Grace 3: A Country Salute to Gospel is a Christian country album with various artists. It was released on June 15, 2004 via Sparrow Records.

== Track listing ==
No.	Title	Writer(s)	Artist(s)	Length
1.	"I'll Fly Away"	Albert E. Brumley	Keith Urban	4:47
2.	"'Tis So Sweet to Trust in Jesus"	Traditional	Cyndi Thomson	3:38
3.	"Softly and Tenderly"	Traditional	Josh Turner	3:36
4.	"Sweet By and By"	Traditional	Sara Evans	3:36
5.	"It Is No Secret"	Stuart Hamblen	Dierks Bentley	3:54
6.	"Leaning on the Everlasting Arms"	Traditional	Buddy Jewell	3:04
7.	"Nothing but the Blood"	Traditional	Steven Curtis Chapman and Mark Miller	3:29
8.	"I Need Thee Every Hour"	Traditional	Jamie O'Neal	3:19
9.	"Victory in Jesus"	Eugene M. Bartlett	Trace Adkins	4:32
10.	"Just a Closer Walk with Thee"	Traditional	Joe Nichols	4:48
11.	"He Touched Me"	William J. Gaither	The Isaacs	3:52

== Chart performance ==
Chart (2004)	Peak position
US Billboard 200	157
US Billboard Top Christian Albums	9
US Billboard Top Country Albums	28
