= Low (Sara Evans song) =

Single by Sara Evans

from the album Billy: The Early Years
- Released: September 29, 2008
- Genre: Country; contemporary bluegrass
- Length: 3:07
- Label: RCA
- Songwriter(s): Morgane Hayes; Stephanie Lewis; Shane Stevens
- Producer(s): Victoria Shaw; Paul Worley

Sara Evans singles chronology
"Love You with All My Heart" (2008)	"Low" (2008)	"Feels Just Like a Love Song" (2009)

"Low" is a song written by Morgane Hayes, Stephanie Lewis and Shane Stevens. It was first recorded by American country artist Sara Evans. It was released as a single in 2008 via RCA Records and issued on the soundtrack for the film, Billy: The Early Years. The song became a minor hit on the Billboard country songs chart and received positive reviews.

== Background ==
In a 2008 interview, Sara Evans explained her reasoning for recording "Low": "Any time you're creating music, you don't want to record the same song over and over again. You want something your fans never heard. And I never to get stale." Kevin John Coyne of Country Universe described "Low" as a song about perseverance that featured mixtures of country and bluegrass instrumentation. The song was originally composed by country music songwriters Morgane Hayes, Stephanie Lewis and Shane Stevens. "Low" was produced by Victoria Shaw and Paul Worley.

== Critical reception ==
"Low" received positive reviews from critics and writers following its release. Jared Johnson of Allmusic highlighted the song as an "album pick" in his review of its corresponding album, Billy: The Early Years. Kevin John Coyne of Country Universe praised its acoustic instrumentation and traditional style, calling it "a wonderful surprise." He also found the song's lyrics to be strong. He concluded by stating: "Evans deserves to reclaim her status as an A-list country star with this. In a career that's been full of distinctive and memorable singles, this is one of the best." Country Standard Time's Dan MacIntosh called Evans' song, "a passionate lyric to sink her teeth into." Russ Breimeier of Christianity Today described the track as "pleasant" and "modern" in his review of the album it was released on.

== Release and music video ==
"Low" was released as a single on September 29, 2008 to country radio via RCA Records. It was released as a CD single. In conjunction with its release, it was announced that "Low" would be issued as the first single in promotion of the soundtrack for the film, Billy: The Early Years. The film was based on the life of Billy Graham. To help promote the single, Evans and country artist Josh Turner attended the world premiere of the film in October 2008. "Low" appeared on the Billboard Hot Country Songs chart for two weeks in October 2008 before peaking at number 59 that same month. "Low" was Evans' first single since 2004 to peak outside of the Billboard country top 40. In October 2008, the official soundtrack album was released, which included the single. Following its release, a music video of the single was issued directed by Robby Benson and Roger Pistole.

== Track listing ==
CD single

- "Low" – 3:07

== Charts ==
Chart (2008)	Peak position
US Hot Country Songs (Billboard)	59
