= My Heart Can't Tell You No =

1988 single by Rod Stewart

Single by Rod Stewart

from the album Out of Order
- Released: September 1988
- Genre: Soft rock
- Length: 5:12
- Label: Warner Bros.
- Songwriters: Simon Climie, Dennis Morgan
- Producers: Rod Stewart, Andy Taylor

Rod Stewart singles chronology
"Forever Young" (1988)	"My Heart Can't Tell You No" (1988)	"Crazy About Her" (1989)

"My Heart Can't Tell You No" is a song written by Simon Climie and Dennis Morgan. It was first recorded and released by British pop-rock artist Rod Stewart on his 1988 album Out of Order. Originally intended as a song for country artist Barbara Mandrell, Stewart ultimately claimed the song for himself. It was later covered in 2011 by American country artist Sara Evans and released as the second single from her sixth studio album, Stronger.

== Rod Stewart version ==
"My Heart Can't Tell You No" was a Top 5 hit on the Billboard Hot 100 and adult contemporary charts, eventually reaching 4 and 3, respectively, in 1989. It was the highest-charting single from the album. In the United Kingdom, the song reached a peak position of 49, becoming his second Top 50 single from Out of Order. A music video was also produced and released for the single. In some releases of the single and the album, the song was incorrectly identified as "My Heart Can't Tell Me No".

=== Critical reception ===
Jon Grein of the Los Angeles Times called the song "obviously commercial". Cash Box called it "an appealing mid-tempo tune" and praised Stewart's vocal performance and the production. Robin Smith of Record Mirror described it as "one of those infectious singalong ballads he's always done so well".

=== Chart positions ===
==== Weekly charts ====
Chart (1988–1989)	Peak position
UK Singles (OCC)	49
US Billboard Hot 100	4
US Adult Contemporary (Billboard)	3

==== Year-end charts ====
Chart (1989)	Position
Canada Top Singles (RPM)	48
US Billboard Hot 100	50
US Adult Contemporary (Billboard)	18

== Sara Evans version ==
"My Heart Can't Tell You No"

Single by Sara Evans

from the album Stronger
- Released: June 20, 2011
- Recorded: 2010
- Genre: Country
- Length: 4:34
- Label: RCA Nashville
- Songwriters: Simon Climie, Dennis Morgan
- Producer: Tony Brown

Sara Evans singles chronology
"A Little Bit Stronger" (2010)	"My Heart Can't Tell You No" (2011)	"Anywhere" (2012)

Music video
- "My Heart Can't Tell You No" on YouTube

=== Critical reception ===
Jon Caramanica of The New York Times called Evans' version of the song a "gentle, regretful cover". Giving it four stars out of five, Bobby Peacock of Roughstock called it a "worthwhile cover" and described the production positively, although he thought that the lyrics were "slightly cluttered and underfocused". Kevin John Coyne, reviewing the song for Country Universe, gave it a D rating, calling it "watery, country-pop claptrap."

==== Reception ====
The video for "My Heart Can't Tell You No" was nominated for Female Video of the Year at the 2012 CMT Music Awards.

=== Chart positions ===
"My Heart Can't Tell You No" debuted at number 54 on the Billboard Hot Country Songs chart for the week dated June 18, 2011. It reached a peak position of 21 on the chart dated January 28, 2012. The song did not enter the Billboard Hot 100, but did peak at number 5 on the Bubbling Under Hot 100 Singles extension chart.

==== Weekly charts ====
Chart (2011–2012)	Peak position
Canada Country (Billboard)	40
US Bubbling Under Hot 100 (Billboard)	5
US Hot Country Songs (Billboard)	21

==== Year-end charts ====
Chart (2011)	Position
US Country Songs (Billboard)	94
Chart (2012)	Position
US Country Songs (Billboard)	90
