= Copy That =

Studio album by Sara Evans
- Released: May 15, 2020
- Genres: Country; pop
- Length: 53:31
- Label: Born to Fly
- Producers: Sara Evans; Jarrad K.

Sara Evans chronology
Live from City Winery Nashville (2019)	Copy That (2020)	Unbroke (2024)

Singles from Copy That
- 1. "If I Can't Have You" Released: March 20, 2020

Copy That is the tenth studio album by American country artist Sara Evans. The album was released on May 15, 2020, via Born to Fly Records and was produced by Jarrad K. The project was Evans's first studio album to consist entirely of covers material. A collection of thirteen songs were chosen for the album and it included two additional artists on the album.

== Background ==
Copy That was produced by Evans and Jarrad K. In his previous work, Jarrad K. also produced music by the Goo Goo Dolls and Weezer. Evans was interested in working with him after hearing his production work on Ruston Kelly's album, Dying Star. The pair began a working relationship that also involved assistance from Evans's children in song selection and production. The Evans family and Jarrad K. chose material that was rooted in the music of Evans's childhood. She performed on a regular basis with her brothers and sisters in a covers band, singing a variety of musical genres. "I grew up onstage in bars, doing the 9 p.m. to 1 a.m. shows, covering songs," Evans recalled. Many of the songs she performed as a child were chosen for the album project.

== Content ==
The album consists of 13 tracks containing a variety of musical styles. This includes three country songs, including Hank Williams's "I'm So Lonesome I Could Cry". In an interview with The Boot Evans commented on the track, "“I've never recorded a Hank Williams song before so I chose, ‘I’m So Lonesome I Could Cry.’ That song is completely in my wheelhouse, I am the most comfortable singing that kind of music and it's real old time-y country. Bluegrass-y Patty Loveless kind of style."

The album also includes covers of Patsy Cline's "She's Got You" and Yvonne Elliman's "If I Can't Have You". The song features guitar work from Evans's oldest child, Avery Barker. Pop music covers are also found on the record. This includes The Pretenders's "Don't Get Me Wrong" and "Come on Eileen" by Dexys Midnight Runners. Rock covers are also included, such as "6th Avenue Heartache" by The Wallflowers. Evans recorded the track as an ode to the band's session drummer Matt Chamberlain. She first hired Chamberlain for her 2001 album Born to Fly because she liked his drumming on the original record of "6th Avenue Heartache."

On the album, Evans collaborates with artists on several different albums tracks. This includes Phillip Sweet (part of the country group Little Big Town) and Old Crow Medicine Show. Evans commented on her collaboration with the Old Crow Medicine Show in an interview with Billboard about the project. "I'm comfortable singing everything, but that just makes me so happy. We called Old Crow Medicine Show, they were the band for that song, and it just sounds like you're literally stepping back to the 1950s."

== Critical reception ==
Professional ratings
Review scores
Source	Rating
Allmusic	2.5/5 stars
Digital Journal	A
PopMatters	Favorable
Rolling Stone	Mixed
The Tennessean	Favorable

Copy That received a mixture of reviews from critics upon its release. Stephen Thomas Erlewine of Allmusic gave the album only 2.5 out of 5 stars. Erlewine questioned Evans's originality as an artist on most of the song selections. "Copy That is a clever title for a covers album, but it also raises the question of whether these new cover versions are mere Xeroxes of the original," he commented. Erlewine did highlight "If I Can't Have You," "It's Too Late" and "I'm So Lonesome I Could Cry" as album highlights. Rolling Stone mentioned that some choices of material were "off the wall." Writer Jon Freeman highlighted the tracks "Come on Eileen" and "If I Can't Have You" as examples of this.

Other reviewers praised the effort. Michael Bialas of PopMatters called Copy That, "a popping fresh collection of 13 cover songs that showcase her powerful pipes and broad musical tastes established while she was a child singer from New Franklin, Missouri, playing four-hour shows in her family band." Markos Papadatos of Digital Journal called it "her greatest album to date." Copy That was also reviewed favorably by The Tennessean. Reviewer Matthew Leimkuehler commented that Evans "shines" on the record.

== Release and commercial performance ==
To promote the new release, Evans issued "If I Can't Have You" as the first single. It was released digitally on March 20, 2020. "It's got great lyrics. It’s so dramatic: If I can’t have you, I don't want anybody. I've always loved it and something about that song just makes me think of my childhood," Evans said about the song. Before the album's official release, Evans issued three additional tracks for promotion: "Whenever I Call You "Friend"", "I'm So Lonesome I Could Cry" and "Hard to Say I'm Sorry". The album was officially released on May 15, 2020. Copy That was Evans's first studio recording to not chart on the Billboard Top Country Albums list. However, the project did chart on the Billboard Top Album Sales survey, where it reached number 44. It also peaked at number 30 on the Billboard Top Current Album Sales chart.

== Track listing ==
No.	Title	Writer(s)	Original artist(s)	Length
1.	"If I Can't Have You"	Barry Gibb; Maurice Gibb; Robin Gibb	Yvonne Elliman	3:10
2.	"Don't Get Me Wrong"	Chrissie Hynde	The Pretenders	3:57
3.	"Come on Eileen"	Billy Adams; Jim Peterson; Kevin Rowland	Dexys Midnight Runners	4:05
4.	"Crazy Love"	Rusty Young	Poco	3:01
5.	"Whenever I Call You "Friend"" (featuring Phillip Sweet)	Kenny Loggins; Melissa Manchester	Kenny Loggins and Stevie Nicks	4:07
6.	"It's Too Late"	Carole King; Toni Stern	Carole King	3:35
7.	"Monday Morning"	Lindsey Buckingham	Fleetwood Mac	2:49
8.	"All We Ever Do Is Say Goodbye"	John Mayer	John Mayer	4:36
9.	"I'm So Lonesome I Could Cry" (featuring Old Crow Medicine Show)	Hank Williams	Hank Williams	3:56
10.	"6th Avenue Heartache"	Jakob Dylan	The Wallflowers	5:52
11.	"My Sharona"	Berton Averre; Doug Fieger	The Knack	3:52
12.	"She's Got You"	Hank Cochran	Patsy Cline	5:01
13.	"Hard to Say I'm Sorry (Note: "Hard to Say I'm Sorry" contains "Get Away" (originally performed by Chicago and written by Peter Cetera, David Foster, and Robert Lamm) and a short sample of "September" (written by Maurice White, Al McKay and Allee Willis and originally performed by Earth, Wind & Fire).)"	Peter Cetera; David Foster	Chicago	5:22
Total length:				53:31

== Personnel ==
All credits are adapted from Genius.

Musical personnel

- Audrey Barker – background vocals
- Olivia Barker – background vocals
- Avery Barker – electric guitar, gang vocals
- Eli Beaird – bass
- Nick Bockrath – guitar
- Jacob Bryant – trumpet
- Caitlyn Burris – gang vocals
- Sara Evans – lead vocals, background vocals
- Billy Justineau – keys, piano
- Jarrad K. – electric guitar

- Lesley Lyons – background vocals
- Molly Lyons – background vocals
- Greg McCarn – gang vocals
- Old Crow Medicine Show – featured artist
- Samantha Rose – gang vocals
- Eric Slick – drums
- Parker Stacey – gang vocals
- Phillip Sweet – featured artist
- Ben Thompson – banjo, gang vocals

Technical personnel

- Matt Combs – strings
- Sara Evans – producer
- Jarrad K. – producer

== Charts ==
Chart (2020)	Peak position
US Top Album Sales (Billboard)	44
US Current Album Sales (Billboard)	30

== Release history ==
Region	Date	Format	Label	Ref.
United States	May 15, 2020	Compact disc; music download; Vinyl	Born to Fly Records	
