= Anywhere (Sara Evans song) =

Single by Sara Evans

from the album Stronger
- Released: June 23, 2012
- Recorded: 2009–2010
- Genre: Country; contemporary country
- Length: 4:06
- Label: RCA Nashville
- Songwriter(s): Matt Evans; Jaren Johnston
- Producer(s): Nathan Chapman; Matt Evans

Sara Evans singles chronology
"My Heart Can't Tell You No" (2011)	"Anywhere" (2012)	"Slow Me Down" (2014)

"Anywhere" is a song written by Matt Evans and Jaren Johnston. It was originally recorded by American country artist Sara Evans for her 2011 studio album, Stronger. In 2012, it was spawned as the third and final single off the album. That year, "Anywhere" became a minor hit on the Billboard country songs chart.

== Background and content ==
"Anywhere" was composed by Matt Evans and Jaren Johnston. Matt is the brother of Sara Evans and is also a part of her touring band. Billy Dukes of Taste of Country called the track to be "a carefree, top-down, who-cares-where-we-end-up sort of driving love song," comparing it to material previously recorded by Jo Dee Messina. The track was recorded between 2009 and 2010 in sessions held by record producer Nathan Chapman and Matt Evans. "Anywhere" was among Evans' only songs to be co-produced her brother.

== Critical reception ==
"Anywhere" received mixed reviews from critics and music writers. Thom Jurek of Allmusic compared it to rock material by John Mellencamp, further commenting that it "walks the line between country and stadium rock with its anthemic chorus." Ben Foster of Country Universe negatively compared the track to that of "Heads Carolina, Tails California" by Jo Dee Messina. Foster especially disliked the song's hook and believed it lack any type of emotional depth found in more of Evans' singles: "You call that a hook? That is so not a hook. It says nothing. It doesn’t tap into any sort of emotion, or convey anything beyond what it says on paper. It’s just… there. It’s hardly worth building a four-minute song around, plus stretching a three-syllable word over four seconds just makes it sound grating." When comparing the song to her 2011 album, Jim Malec of American Noise called the song to be "derivative" and "formulaic."

== Release and music video ==
"Anywhere" was released as a single to country music radio on June 23, 2012, via RCA Nashville. It was the third and final single issued off her 2011 studio album, Stronger. The song spent a total of four weeks on the Billboard Hot Country Songs during the summer of 2012. In August, the single peaked at number 53 on the country songs chart. It was Evans' seventh charted single to peak outside the Billboard country top 40. Her next single would not reach the country songs chart until late 2013.

== Charts ==
Chart (2012)	Peak position
US Hot Country Songs (Billboard)	53
