= Words (Sara Evans album) =

Studio album by Sara Evans
- Released: July 21, 2017
- Genre: Country
- Length: 51:55
- Label: Born to Fly
- Producer: Mark Bright; Sara Evans

Sara Evans chronology
Slow Me Down (2014)	Words (2017)	The Barker Family Band (2019)

Singles from Words
- 1. "Marquee Sign" Released: June 9, 2017; 2. "All the Love You Left Me" Released: January 29, 2018; 3. "Long Way Down" Released: November 2018

Words is the ninth studio album by American country music singer Sara Evans. She released it independently on July 21, 2017 via her own Born to Fly Records. The lead single is "Marquee Sign".

== Content ==
The album features fourteen songs, all of which have at least one female writer. Evans said that this was unintentional. She also told Billboard that "Eighty percent of this album will make you cry, and twenty percent will make you so happy. It's really deep with incredible lyrics. That's why I decided to call the album Words." Evans wrote one of the songs, "Letting You Go", about her son Avery. An acoustic version of Evans' Number One hit "A Little Bit Stronger" was also included as its final track.

"Long Way Down" was previously recorded by The SteelDrivers on their 2015 album, The Muscle Shoals Recordings.

== Critical reception ==
Rating it 4 out of 5 stars, Stephen Thomas Erlewine of AllMusic wrote that "it never flaunts its diversity; instead, its eclecticism is casual, with Evans sliding from stripped-back country-folk to breezy modern pop with ease" and "there's a measured assurance to her performances that lends the album warmth." Matt Bjorke of Roughstock was positive, stating that "it finds her refreshed and sounding better than she did on her past couple of releases".

== Commercial performance ==
The album debuted at No. 4 on the Top Country Albums chart and No. 2 on the Independent Albums chart, selling 9,900 copies in the first week. It has sold 26,800 copies in the United States as of March 2018.

== Track listing ==
No.	Title	Writer(s)	Length
1.	"Long Way Down"	Liz Hengber, Tammy Rogers, Jerry Salley	4:14
2.	"Marquee Sign"	Evans, Heather Morgan, Jimmy Robbins	4:00
3.	"Diving in Deep"	Hillary Lindsey, Steve McEwan, Gordie Sampson	2:36
4.	"All the Love You Left Me"	Lindsey, Sampson, Ben West	4:17
5.	"Like the Way You Love Me"	Evans, Jason Massey	3:04
6.	"Rain and Fire"	Charles Harmon, Claude Kelly	3:38
7.	"Night Light"	Jaida Dreyer, Daniel Tashian	3:38
8.	"I Need a River"	Marcus Hummon, Sonya Isaacs, Darrell Scott	4:22
9.	"I Don't Trust Myself"	McEwan, Sampson, Caitlyn Smith	3:34
10.	"Make Room at the Bottom"	Brett James, Ashley Monroe	3:12
11.	"Words"	David Hodges, Robbins, Jake Scott	2:48
12.	"I Want You"	Thomas Lee Brown, Victoria McCants, Travis Sayles, Shane Stevens	3:41
13.	"Letting You Go"	Victoria Banks, Evans, Emily Shackelton	4:11
14.	"A Little Bit Stronger" (acoustic)	Luke Laird, Lindsey, Hillary Scott	4:40
Total length:			51:55

== Personnel ==
- Sara Evans – lead vocals, backing vocals
- Gordon Mote – acoustic piano, synthesizers, synth pads, Hammond B3 organ, strings, marimba
- J.T. Corenflos – electric guitars, guitar solos
- Ilya Toshinsky – acoustic guitar, electric guitars, banjo, bouzouki, dobro, mandolin
- Aubrey Haynie – fiddle, mandolin
- Jimmie Lee Sloas – bass
- Matt Chamberlain – drums, congas, cymbals, hand drums, percussion, shaker, tambourine
- Lesley Evans Lyons – backing vocals
- Olivia Evans – backing vocals
- Matt Evans – backing vocals
- Ashley Evans Simpson – backing vocals
- Shane Stevens – backing vocals

== Charts ==
Chart (2017)	Peak position
US Billboard 200	46
US Top Country Albums (Billboard)	4
US Independent Albums (Billboard)	2
