= As If (Sara Evans song) =

Single by Sara Evans

from the album Greatest Hits
- Released: June 25, 2007
- Genre: Country; country pop
- Length: 3:32
- Label: RCA Nashville
- Songwriters: Sara Evans; Hillary Lindsey; John Shanks
- Producer: John Shanks

Sara Evans singles chronology
"You'll Always Be My Baby" (2006)	"As If" (2007)	"Some Things Never Change" (2008)

Music video
- "As If" at CMT.com

"As If" is a song recorded by American country music artist Sara Evans for her 2007 Greatest Hits compilation album. Written by Evans, Hillary Lindsey, and John Shanks and produced by the latter, it was released on June 25, 2007 as the lead single from the compilation. It became her 12th top-20 hit, peaking at number 11 on the US Hot Country Songs chart. On Mediabase's Country Aircheck chart, the song reached number ten.

== Content ==
"As If" is a moderate up-tempo song co-written by Sara Evans with Hillary Lindsey and John Shanks, backed primarily with percussion and electric guitar. The narrator describes being in love, hoping that no matter what, the feelings she shares for her man will never fade. In the end they eventually do, but she's acting "as if" they will not.

== Critical reception ==
Kevin J. Coyne of Country Universe gave the song an A rating. "It’s no surprise to me that it’s a charming record, perfectly produced and expertly sung. And, as usual, it’s just offbeat enough to be genuinely different from anything else on the radio."

== Music video ==
A music video was released for the song, directed by Roman White. The video shows Evans in a store, shopping for the perfect man, which she then takes home to live with her. She is then shown performing the song while her new men do the house work in the background. Evans ends up going through three men before finding that the right guy for her is the UPS man (who delivers each of her men to her house) she has seen all along.

The video was ranked #23 on the 2008 version of CMT's 40 Sexiest Videos.

== Charts ==
"As If" debuted at number 52 on the US Billboard Hot Country Songs chart on June 23, 2007 with 883,000 impressions.

Chart (2007)	Peak position
Canada Hot 100 (Billboard)	81
Canada Country (Billboard)	18
US Billboard Hot 100	62
US Hot Country Songs (Billboard)	11
US Billboard Pop 100	74
US Country Aircheck (Mediabase)	10

=== Year-end charts ===
Chart (2007)	Position
US Country Songs (Billboard)	60
