= Some Things Never Change (Sara Evans song) =

Single by Sara Evans

from the album Greatest Hits
- Released: February 4,2008
- Genre: Country
- Length: 4:09
- Label: RCA Nashville
- Songwriter(s): Sara Evans; Matt Evans; Hillary Lindsey; John Shanks
- Producer(s): John Shanks

Sara Evans singles chronology
"As If" (2007)	"Some Things Never Change" (2008)	"Love You with All My Heart" (2008)

"Some Things Never Change" is a song co-written and recorded by American country music singer Sara Evans. It was released in February 2008 as the second single from her Greatest Hits compilation album. The song reached number 26 on the US Billboard Hot Country Songs chart. Evans wrote this song with her brother Matt Evans, Hillary Lindsey, and John Shanks.

== Content ==
This song is a celebration of home, family, and such simple pleasures as seeing the kids get off the bus at the end of the school day. The song's title, "some things never change", is based on how the central character realizes that, while things may change in the world around her, the basics of love between family will never change.

== Chart performance ==
Chart (2008)	Peak position
US Hot Country Songs (Billboard)	26
