= You'll Always Be My Baby =

Single by Sara Evans

from the album Real Fine Place
- Released: September 5, 2006
- Genre: Country
- Length: 4:37
- Label: RCA Nashville
- Songwriters: Sara Evans, Tony Martin, Tom Shapiro
- Producers: Sara Evans, Mark Bright

Sara Evans singles chronology
"Coalmine" (2006)	"You'll Always Be My Baby" (2006)	"As If" (2007)

"You'll Always Be My Baby" is a song co-written and recorded by American country music artist Sara Evans. It was released in September 5, 2006 as the fourth and final single from her 2005 album Real Fine Place. The song peaked at number 13 on the US Billboard Hot Country Songs chart. The song is also included on Evans' 2007 Greatest Hits album. Evans wrote this song with Tony Martin and Tom Shapiro.

Evans released a gift book featuring this song's lyrics as well as pictures of Evans with her three children, and her mother.

== Content ==
The first verse of the song describes Evans as a young girl making a mistake and being afraid of disappointing her father. The second verse describes Evans as a young adult having a sexual encounter and afraid of disappointing God. However, the refrain remarks that the both of them still love her. In the third verse, Evans reflects on being the mother of a young son, and praying that she will be just as loving when her son makes mistakes.

Evans' father, Jack Evans, sings backing vocals on the song.

== Music video ==
A music video was directed by Kristin Barlowe. It premiered on CMT on September 14, 2006. The video for the song showed Evans in an old house, while a father and daughter talked about how she let him down. The father hugs his daughter and dances with her. The next scene showed a young woman and man in a car with Evans standing in front of the car singing about how she regrets a night of passion with a man. In the last scene, Evans is with a man and a little boy (played by her then-husband Craig Schleske and son), singing about how she will raise her own son.

== Chart performance ==
Chart (2006–2007)	Peak position
US Hot Country Songs (Billboard)	13
US Billboard Bubbling Under Hot 100	5
