= Cheatin' (song) =

Single by Sara Evans

from the album Real Fine Place
- Released: October 31, 2005
- Genre: Country pop
- Length: 3:26
- Label: RCA Nashville
- Songwriters: Brett James; Don Schlitz
- Producers: Mark Bright; Sara Evans

Sara Evans singles chronology
"A Real Fine Place to Start" (2005)	"Cheatin'" (2005)	"Coalmine" (2006)

"Cheatin'" is a song written by Brett James and Don Schlitz and recorded by American country music artist Sara Evans. It was released in October 2005 as the second single from Evans’ 2005 album Real Fine Place. The song peaked at No. 9 on the US Billboard Hot Country Songs chart in early 2006, and was later included on Evans' Greatest Hits album.

== Content ==
This moderate-tempo song is about a woman who is angry about her husband cheating on her. The song talks about all the problems that the husband faces for leaving his wife for his mistress, including living in a trailer park and driving an old beat-up car. The mistress then leaves him, after spending all of his money.

== Music video ==
The music video, directed by Peter Zavadil, shows scenes of the ex-husband, played by David Allan Donah, sitting in his trailer and working at a bowling alley, very unhappy with his new lifestyle. It is implied through the lyrics that Evans ended up with nearly all of his possessions after the divorce. He eventually turns to gambling and crime after falling deep into debt, resulting in his eviction from the trailer. Evans appears regularly in the music video performing with a microphone stand inside and outside the trailer.

The music video reached number 1 on CMT's Top Twenty Countdown for the week of March 30, 2006.

== Chart performance ==
Chart (2005–2006)	Peak position
US Hot Country Songs (Billboard)	9
US Billboard Hot 100	69

=== Year-end charts ===
Chart (2006)	Position
US Country Songs (Billboard)	43
