= Born to Fly (song) =

2000 single by Sara Evans

Single by Sara Evans

from the album Born to Fly
- B-side: "I Could Not Ask for More"
- Released: June 26, 2000
- Genre: Country
- Length: 3:35 (single edit); 5:36 (album version)
- Label: RCA Nashville
- Songwriters: Sara Evans, Marcus Hummon, Darrell Scott
- Producers: Sara Evans, Paul Worley

Sara Evans singles chronology
"That's the Beat of a Heart" (2000)	"Born to Fly" (2000)	"I Could Not Ask for More" (2001)

Music video
- "Born to Fly" at CMT.com

"Born to Fly" is a song co-written and recorded by American country music artist Sara Evans. It was released in June 2000 as the first single and title track from her 2000 album of the same name. It became Evans' second number one hit on the U.S. Billboard Hot Country Singles & Tracks (now Hot Country Songs) chart in January 2001. Evans wrote this song with Marcus Hummon and Darrell Scott.

== Content ==
"Born to Fly" is an uptempo country song that is backed primarily with fiddles. The song's narrator is portrayed as a person wanting to expand their horizons and dreams of being somebody, who is tired of being stuck in the same place, and wants to get out. The song makes analogies to a bird spreading its wings and flying to its new destination.

The album version features a long instrumental outro for the song.

A bluegrass version of the song can be found on her 2011 album, Stronger.

== Music video ==
The accompanying music video for the song, Sara's first of many to be directed by Peter Zavadil, shows Evans portraying Dorothy, the main character from The Wizard of Oz motion picture. The video also features many of the same story elements as the movie, such as a tornado, a wicked witch, and a little black dog. The video won the CMA Award for Video of the Year in 2001, Evans' first (and only as of 2020).

The video was ranked #34 on CMT's 100 Greatest Videos.

== Cover versions ==
- Country singer Lauren Alaina covered this song on the tenth season of American Idol.
- Danielle Bradbery covered this song on the fourth season of The Voice.

== Chart performance ==
"Born to Fly" debuted at number 59 on the U.S. Billboard Hot Country Singles & Tracks for the week of July 1, 2000.

Chart (2000–2001)	Peak position
Canada Country Singles (RPM)	7 (Note: "Born to Fly" had not yet peaked when RPM ceased publication in November 2000.)
US Hot Country Songs (Billboard)	1
US Billboard Hot 100	34

=== Year-end charts ===
Chart (2000)	Position
US Country Songs (Billboard)	55

Chart (2001)	Position
US Country Songs (Billboard)	39
