= Real Fine Place =

Studio album by Sara Evans
- Released: October 4, 2005
- Recorded: 2004–2005
- Studio: Starstruck Studios (Nashville, Tennessee); The Sound Kitchen (Franklin, Tennessee).
- Genre: Country
- Length: 52:56
- Label: RCA Nashville
- Producer: Sara Evans; Mark Bright

Sara Evans chronology
Restless (2003)	Real Fine Place (2005)	The Video Collection (2006)

Singles from Real Fine Place
- 1. "A Real Fine Place to Start" Released: May 9, 2005; 2. "Cheatin'" Released: October 31, 2005; 3. "Coalmine" Released: April 22, 2006; 4. "You'll Always Be My Baby" Released: September 5, 2006

Professional ratings
Review scores
Source	Rating
Allmusic	4/5 stars

Real Fine Place is the fifth studio album by American country music artist Sara Evans. It was released in October 2005 via RCA Records Nashville. It is the follow-up album to the platinum Restless. It features Evans's fourth number one hit "A Real Fine Place to Start", the Top 10 hit "Cheatin'", the Top 20 hit "You'll Always Be My Baby", and the Top 40 hit "Coalmine". The album debuted at number 3 on the US Billboard 200 chart, selling 124,720 copies in its first week. The album was certified platinum by the Recording Industry Association of America (RIAA) for U.S. shipments of a million copies.

== Content ==
The track "A Real Fine Place to Start" was co-written by Radney Foster, who previously recorded it for his 2002 album Another Way to Go. Evans's rendition of the song was released as this album's first single and became her fourth number one hit on the US Billboard Hot Country Songs chart in mid-2005. Also released as singles from this album were "Cheatin'", "Coalmine", and "You'll Always Be My Baby", which respectively reached numbers 9, 37, and 13 on the country charts. "Missing Missouri" also reached number 52 based on unsolicited airplay. Several members of Evans's family sing backing vocals: her mother and father, Patricia Boggs, and Jack Evans; her brother, Matt Evans, who also serves as production assistant; and her sisters, Lesley Evans Lyons and Ashley Evans Simpson.

"Supernatural" was originally recorded by Susan Ashton on her 1999 album Closer.

== Track listing ==
Standard edition
No.	Title	Writer(s)	Length
1.	"Coalmine"	Roxie Dean; Ron Harbin; Richie McDonald	3:26
2.	"A Real Fine Place to Start"	Radney Foster; George Ducas	3:58
3.	"Cheatin'"	Brett James; Don Schlitz	3:26
4.	"New Hometown"	Sara Evans; Matt Evans; Shaye Smith	3:54
5.	"You'll Always Be My Baby"	S. Evans; Tony Martin; Tom Shapiro	4:37
6.	"Supernatural"	Marcus Hummon; Mark Prentice	4:38
7.	"Roll Me Back in Time"	Sheryl Crow; John Shanks	4:55
8.	"The Secrets That We Keep"	S. Evans; Chris Lindsey; Aimee Mayo	3:40
9.	"Bible Song"	Lori McKenna	4:46
10.	"Tell Me"	S. Evans; Holly Lamar; Troy Verges	3:54
11.	"Missing Missouri"	Mark Kerr; Trent Tomlinson; Danny Wells	4:15
12.	"Momma's Night Out"	S. Evans; Hummon; Darrell Scott	2:52
13.	"These Four Walls"	S. Evans; M. Evans; Verges	4:35
Total length:			52:56

Target bonus tracks
No.	Title	Writer(s)	Length
14.	"Caged"	S. Evans; Hummon	3:31
15.	"Best Days Are Coming"	Ed Hill; Smith	4:02
16.	"You"	James; Verges	3:34
17.	"Suds in the Bucket" (live)	Billy Montana; Tammy "Jenai" Wagoner	4:02

== Personnel ==
According to liner notes.

- Sara Evans – lead vocals, backing vocals
- Tim Akers – keyboards, acoustic piano, accordion, penny whistle
- Steve Nathan – keyboards, acoustic piano, Hammond organ
- Paul Franklin – keyboards, slide guitar, steel guitar
- Marcus Hummon – acoustic guitar
- Darrell Scott – acoustic guitar
- Bryan Sutton – acoustic guitar
- Biff Watson – acoustic guitar
- Tom Bukovac – electric guitars
- J.T. Corenflos – electric guitars
- Gary Morse – steel guitar
- Randy Scruggs – banjo
- Aubrey Haynie – fiddle, mandolin
- David LaBruyere – bass
- Glenn Worf – bass
- Matt Chamberlain – drums
- David Huff – drum programming
- Eric Darken – percussion, Jew's harp
- Jim Horn – baritone saxophone (12), horn arrangements (12)
- Jeff Coffin – tenor saxophone (12)
- Randy Leago – tenor saxophone (12)
- Chris Dunn – trombone (12)
- John Hinchey – trombone (12)
- Steve Herrman – trumpet (12)
- Steve Patrick – trumpet (12)
- Quentin Ware – trumpet (12)
- Chris McDonald – string arrangements and conductor
- Carl Gorodetzky – string contractor
- The Nashville String Machine – strings
- LaTara Conley – backing vocals
- Kim Fleming – backing vocals
- Vicki Hampton – backing vocals
- Wes Hightower – backing vocals
- Troy Johnson – backing vocals
- Janelle Means – backing vocals
- Desmond Pringle – backing vocals
- Kevin Whalum – backing vocals
- Matt Evans – backing vocals (1, 2, 9, 10)
- Lesley Evans Lyons – backing vocals (4, 7, 9, 10, 13)
- Ashley Evans Simpson – backing vocals (4, 7, 9, 10, 13)
- Jack Evans – backing vocals (5)
- Patricia Boggs – backing vocals (13)

== Production ==
- Sara Evans – producer
- Mark Bright – producer
- Derek Bason – recording, mixing
- J.R. Rodriguez – additional recording, recording assistant, mix assistant
- Chris Ashburn – recording assistant, mix assistant
- Scott Kidd – recording assistant, mix assistant
- Hank Williams – mastering at MasterMix (Nashville, Tennessee)
- Mike "Frog" Griffith – production coordinator
- Matt Evans – production assistant
- Astrid Herbold May – art direction, design
- S. Wade Hunt – cover design
- Russ Harrington – photography
- Debbie Dover – hair stylist
- Colleen Runne – make-up
- Claudia Fowler – wardrobe stylist

== Chart performance ==
=== Weekly charts ===
Chart (2005)	Peak position
US Billboard 200	3
US Top Country Albums (Billboard)	1

=== Year-end charts ===
Chart (2005)	Position
US Top Country Albums (Billboard)	46
Chart (2006)	Position
US Billboard 200	188
US Top Country Albums (Billboard)	30
Chart (2007)	Position
US Top Country Albums (Billboard)	75

=== Singles ===
Year	Single	Peak chart positions		Certifications
Year	Single	US Country	US	Certifications
2005	"A Real Fine Place to Start"	1	38	* RIAA: Gold
2005	"Cheatin'"	9	69	
2006	"Coalmine"	37	—	
2006	"You'll Always Be My Baby"	13	105	
"—" denotes releases that did not chart

== Certifications ==
Region	Certification
United States (RIAA)	Platinum
