= Sara Evans =

American country singer (born 1971)

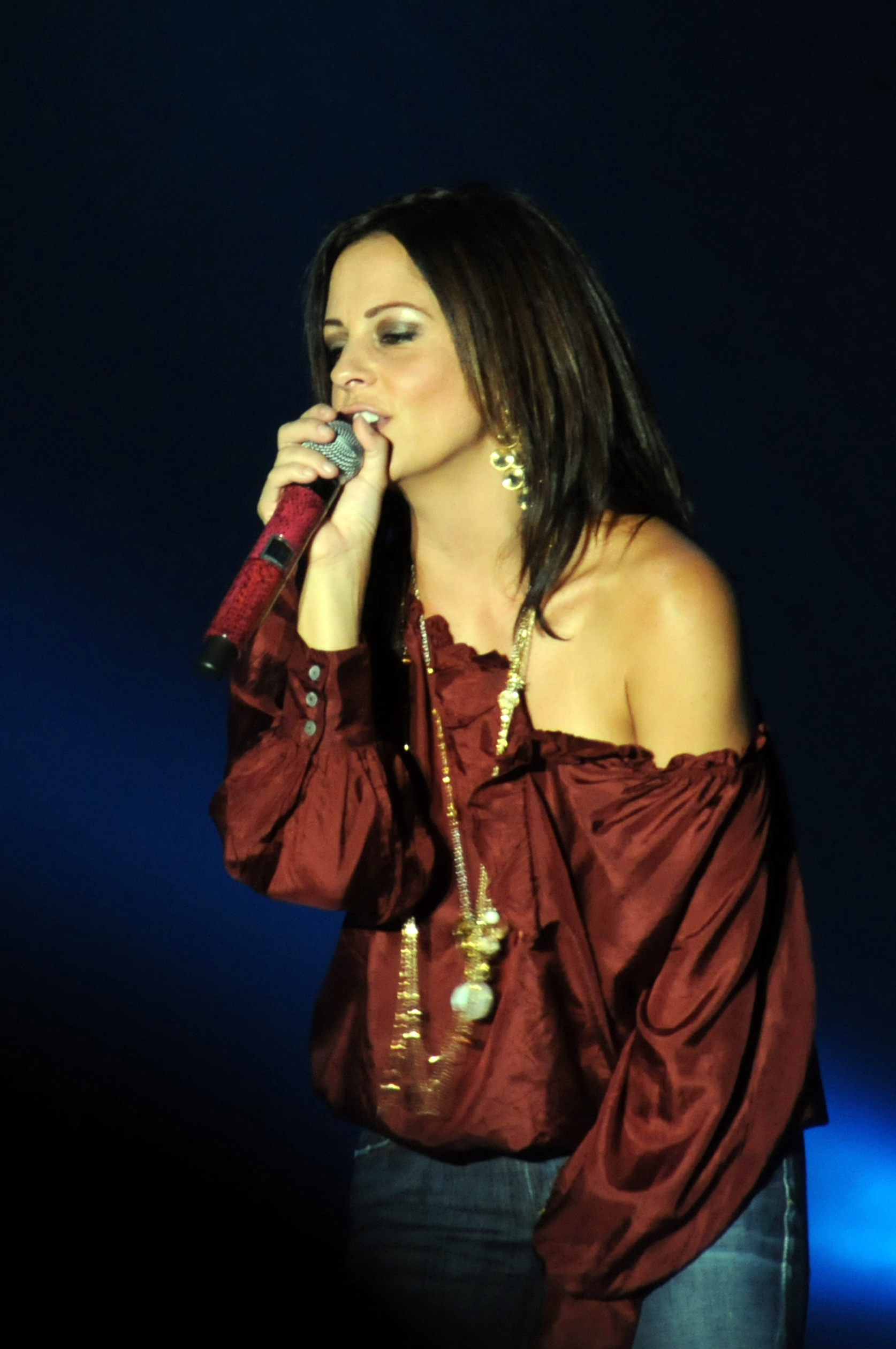
- Sara Evans performing at the Naval Amphibious Base, 2008.
- Born: Sara Lynn Evans; February 5, 1971 (age 55); Boonville, Missouri, U.S.
- Occupations: Singer; songwriter; record producer; author; actress
- Years active: 1997–present
- Spouses: Craig Schelske (m. 1993; div. 2007) Jay Barker (m. 2008)
- Children: 3
- Musical career
- Genre: Country
- Instrument: Vocals
- Labels: RCA Nashville; Born to Fly; Melody Place
- Website: saraevans.com

Sara Lynn Evans (/ˈsɛərə/; born February 5, 1971) is an American country music singer, songwriter, and record producer. She had five songs reach the number one spot on the Billboard country songs chart and has sold over six million albums. Nine additional singles have reached the top ten of the Billboard country chart, including "I Could Not Ask for More", "I Keep Looking", and "Cheatin'". Among her top 20 charting singles are "Saints & Angels", "Backseat of a Greyhound Bus", and "As If". She has won accolades from the Academy of Country Music and the Country Music Association. She has also been nominated for several more accolades from both associations, including Female Vocalist of the Year and Single of the Year.

Evans grew up in New Franklin, Missouri, and started performing alongside her siblings in The Evans Family Band. The group performed throughout her childhood and early teenage years in her local area. During her teenage years, Evans and her older brother Matt formed their own band before moving to Nashville in 1991 to pursue a country music career. In Nashville, Evans met her first husband Craig Schelske and briefly moved to Aumsville, Oregon, before returning to Nashville. Upon moving back to Nashville, Evans found work as a demo singer, which led to her signing a recording contract with RCA Records. Her first album Three Chords and the Truth was released in 1997. It was followed by No Place That Far (1998), whose second single of the same name topped the Billboard country chart.

Evans reached her peak success in the 2000s with the albums Born to Fly (2000), Restless (2003) and Real Fine Place (2005). The albums sold over one million copies each and included the number one country singles "Born to Fly", "Suds in the Bucket" and "A Real Fine Place to Start". In 2006, Evans appeared as a contestant on Dancing with the Stars before subsequently dropping out. Evans took steps back from her recording career to focus on her family life, only releasing a Greatest Hits package in 2008. She re-launched her career in 2011 with her sixth studio album Stronger. It was supported by the two-week number one single "A Little Bit Stronger". After the release of Slow Me Down (2014), Evans left RCA and formed her own record label. In 2017, she released her first album through the label, Words.

== Early life ==
Sara Lynn Evans was born in Boonville, Missouri, on February 5, 1971. She was raised in New Franklin, Missouri by parents Pat and Jack Evans. She was one of seven children (which also included her half siblings after her mother remarried). The Evans family was raised on a 400-acre farm that included several crops and livestock. To make ends meet, her mother became a school bus driver while her father became a pressman for the Columbia Daily Tribune newspaper. Evans's family discovered she had a natural singing ability after she started singing along with her two older brothers who were taking guitar lessons. This prompted Evans's mother to put her siblings into a band which they later called The Evans Family Band. Evans started performing lead vocals in the band when she was six years old. She later learned to perform guitar, mandolin, and drums.

Evans was raised on a farm in New Franklin. When she was eight years old, Evans was hit by a car after crossing the highway that faced her family's farm. She was thrown onto the hood of the car and eventually landed in a grassy field along the highway. She had suffered a concussion and a leg injury. Due to the severity of her injuries, Evans was sent to the University of Missouri Hospital, located 30 miles from her hometown. To avoid having a deformed left leg, doctors had to drill pins into Evans's knee. She was unable to move from her hospital bed for six weeks. According to Evans, the accident itself and being tied to the hospital bed resulted in her having post-traumatic stress disorder. "I had severe PTSD and anxiety, but it was the '80s, and I didn't have a name for it," she explained.

In 1983, Evans's parents divorced. Her mother remarried in 1985 and the couple had two more children (Evans's half sisters). After her mother remarried, the family moved to a tobacco farm, also located in New Franklin. The Evans Family Band continued performing as well. The group often performed on weekends and later had a manager. When she was about ten years old, Evans recorded a song called "I'm Gonna Be the Only Female Fiddle Player in Charlie Daniels Band". She then traveled to Nashville alongside her manager to promote the song at Fan Fair. Evans later performed on a local program called Country Stampede and briefly formed a band with her brother Matt. In 1989, Evans graduated high school. She accepted a full scholarship to study music at Central Methodist University in Fayette, Missouri. However, she left after one semester once realizing she wanted to pursue a country music career. She returned to her mother's New Franklin farm where she got a job at the Holiday Inn as a waitress. With the money saved from waiting tables, Evans and her brother Matt moved to Nashville in 1991.

After moving to Nashville, Evans got a job waiting tables during the breakfast shift at another Holiday Inn restaurant. At the restaurant she would meet her first husband who was also a waiter at the Holiday Inn. The couple started dating and temporarily moved to Aumsville, Oregon, in 1992. In Oregon, she performed billed as Sara Evans & North Santiam. The couple married while in Oregon and spent three years there before returning to Nashville in the mid-1990s. Through her lawyer, Evans got a job as a demo singer. Among the demos she recorded was a cover of Buck Owens's "I've Got a Tiger by the Tail", which was originally intended to be sent to Patty Loveless. Her demo was heard by Nashville songwriter Harlan Howard who was impressed by Evans's traditional country singing style. Howard convinced executives at RCA Records to hear Evans sing. In a live audition for RCA executive Joe Galante, Evans sang three songs. The same day, Evans was offered a recording contract from RCA Records. She accepted and signed a seven-album deal with the label.

== Career ==
=== 1997–1999: Three Chords and the Truth and early success ===
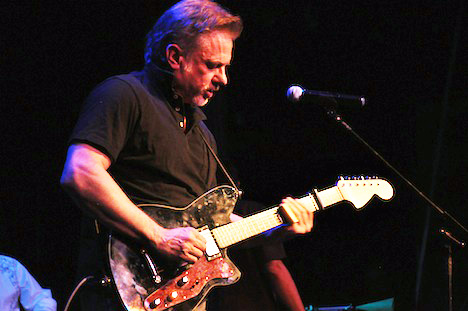
Pete Anderson produced Evans's debut album.

Evans quit her job following the signing of her contract. She chose to have her album produced by Pete Anderson, a producer and guitarist best known for his work with Dwight Yoakam. To record the album, she moved to Los Angeles. In July 1997, Three Chords and the Truth was released on RCA. The album's sound centered around traditional honky tonk country and drew critical acclaim. Allmusic's James Chrispell positively commented, "This disc rings out with an air of originality helped along by great tunes and solid backup musicianship." Billboard commented, "At once a preserver of the best of country's history and a progressive writer and singer forging a timeless contemporary country sound, she invites favorable comparisons to the best country divas." However, the album was not commercially successful. The disc peaked at number 56 on the Billboard country albums chart. Its three singles—in order of release, True Lies, the title track, and "Shame About That"—peaked outside the Billboard country songs top 40. According to Evans, country radio refused to play the singles, claiming they were "too country". "It was the most disheartening experience of my life–at least to this point," she reflected in her memoir.

In an effort to have commercial success, Evans went back into the studio to record her next album. She intended to cut an album that was contemporary yet "without compromising" her musical interests. The result was No Place That Far, released in October 1998 on RCA. The project peaked at number 11 on the Billboard country albums chart. While its lead single ("Cryin' Game") peaked outside the country top 40, its second single (the title track) reached the number one spot on the Billboard country songs chart. Its success was due to the buy-in from country radio programmers who were invited to a private showcase of her new repertoire in Cincinnati, Ohio. "By the end of the show, they were all eating out of my hands and singing my praises," Evans recounted. The album's final single "Fool, I'm a Woman" only reached number 32 on the country songs chart, which disappointed Evans. "It felt like I was constantly starting over, like in Groundhog Day, with these people at country radio," she commented. To rebuild career momentum, Evans hired a co-manager. Evans also discovered she was pregnant with her first child during this time. This caused friction with her record label who encouraged her to "lose the baby weight as soon as possible".

=== 2000–2005: Peak success ===
Evans was motivated to make shifts in her career after watching Faith Hill's "Breathe" music video. "I'm going to lose this weight, grow my hair long, and make the best album Nashville has ever heard," she recounted. She was drawn to the bluegrass sound by Dixie Chicks and sought out their producer, Paul Worley. She also sought out rock session musician Matt Chamberlain to play drums. Together, they would craft Evans's third studio album. In October 2000, Born to Fly was released on RCA Nashville. Evans co-produced the project with Worley. The disc became Evans's breakout album, certifying double platinum by the Recording Industry Association of America (RIAA) for sales of over two million copies in the United States. Critic Thom Jurek took notice of the record. He described Evans as having the "confidence and authority of a seasoned veteran who is in control of her work." Born to Fly peaked at number six on the Billboard country albums chart and number 55 on the Billboard 200.

"Born to Fly"
Rock session drummer Matt Chamberlain played on the introduction of Evans' 2000 single "Born to Fly". Chamberlain and producer Paul Worley helped establish Evans' musical sound.

Four singles were released from Born to Fly. First was the title track, which Evans co-wrote with Darrell Scott and Marcus Hummon. This reached the number one spot on the Billboard country singles chart and number 34 on the Hot 100. Next was a cover of Edwin McCain's "I Could Not Ask for More", followed by "Saints & Angels" and "I Keep Looking", the latter a top-five country hit in 2002. In 2001, Evans received five nominations from the Country Music Association Awards. This included Female Vocalist of the Year and Album of the Year. She later won Music Video of the Year for Born to Fly's title track. The Academy of Country Music Awards also nominated her for Top Female Vocalist. With her new success, Evans joined Reba McEntire, Martina McBride, Jamie O'Neal, and Carolyn Dawn Johnson on the all-women headlining Girls Night Out Tour in 2001.

In August 2003, her fourth studio album Restless was released, with Evans and Worley continuing to co-produce. Restless was met with mixed reviews. Writer Edward Morris described it as being "more pop than country in sound and attitude". James Christopher Monger found it to be "slick and predictable". Restless debuted at number three on the Top Country Albums chart reached number 20 on the Billboard 200 and certified platinum in the United States. While the lead single "Backseat of a Greyhound Bus", reached the top 20, its second single, "Perfect", climbed to the number two spot on Billboard country chart. The album's third single was the traditionally-sounding "Suds in the Bucket". The song was not intended to be part of the project's track list but Evans pushed for its inclusion. It became her third number one song on the Billboard country chart. The fourth and final single "Tonight" was less successful, peaking outside the top 40 of Hot Country Songs in 2005. Evans was subsequently nominated for several awards by the Academy of Country Music in both 2003 and 2004 She received similar nominations from the Country Music Association. In 2004, she co-headlined the Mud & Suds Tour with Brad Paisley.

In 2005, Evans released a cover of Radney Foster's "A Real Fine Place to Start". It became her fourth number one song on the Billboard country survey and her fourth song to reach the Top 40 on Hot 100. It would serve as the title track to her fifth studio album Real Fine Place, which was released in October 2005. Unlike her previous albums, Evans co-produced with Mark Bright. Sue Keough of BBC called it "the perfect balance between radio-friendly country pop and the rootsy sounds she offered with her 1997 debut Three Chords And The Truth." Meanwhile, Slant Magazine's Jonathan Keefe gave it 2.5 stars, calling its notoriety in her catalog "less than essential". Despite mixed reviews, the disc was her first to top the Billboard country albums chart. It also debuted at number three on the Billboard 200. Like its predecessors, it also certified platinum in sales. Real Fine Place also included the single "Cheatin'", which reached the number nine spot on the country chart. While the follow-up single "Coalmine" faltered on the charts, follow-up "You'll Always Be My Baby" reached number 13 in 2006. She would also win the Top Female Vocalist award from the Academy of Country Music.

=== 2006–2009: Setbacks and music hiatus ===
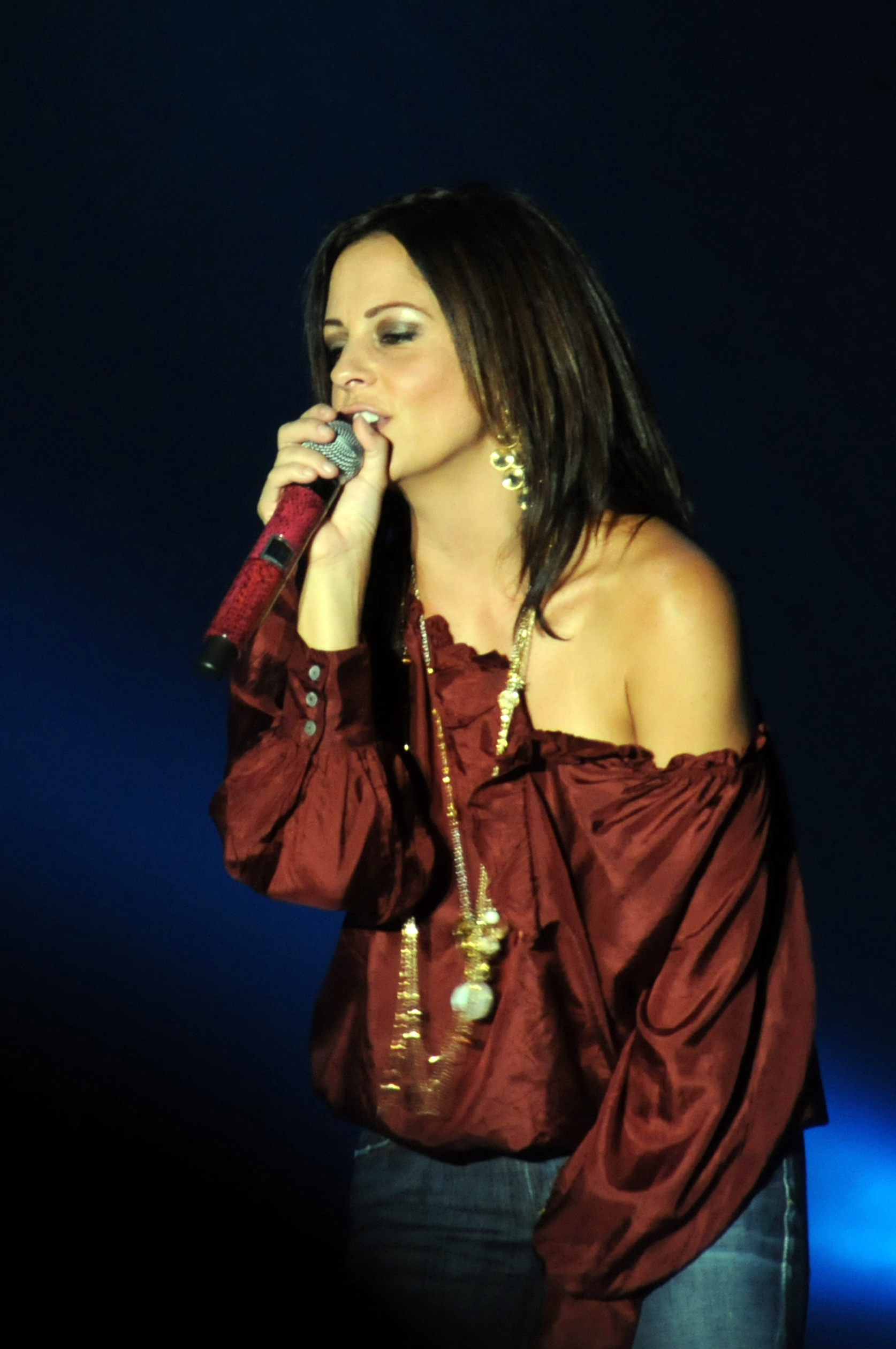
Evans in concert, 2008

By 2006, Evans had reached the height of her career. She was headlining her own tours, and made almost 300 appearances in one year. In August of that year, Evans joined the cast of Dancing with the Stars which aired on the ABC network. She made her first appearance on the show in September alongside dancing partner Tony Dovolani. Evans moved her family to Beverly Hills, California where the show rented her a home while she competed on the program. "It was absolutely exhausting and totally invigorating at the same time," she reflected in her memoir. At the same time, Evans's marriage to husband Craig Schelske was ending. The stress in her personal life caused Evans to suffer from anxiety and panic attacks. A month following her first appearance, she announced her departure from the show after filing for divorce from Schelske. "I had to quit working altogether, focus on my children, and really figure out what I was going to do," she later explained.

Evans's divorce received widespread media attention between 2006 and 2007. These personal events delayed plans for the recording of a studio album for several years. However, Evans did continue to sporadically release new music. In 2007, RCA released her first compilation album of Greatest Hits. The project reached number three on the Billboard country albums chart and number eight on the Billboard 200. The disc featured twelve of her most popular recordings, along with four new tracks co-written by Evans. AllMusic's Thom Jurek gave the album three stars, criticizing its production and choice of material. Three of its new songs were released as singles. Its lead single "As If" reached number 11 on the Billboard country songs chart. It was followed by the top 40 entry "Some Things Never Change". Later that year, she co-hosted the Country Music Association Awards.

In May 2008, Evans appeared on CMT Crossroads, a music show on CMT which paired country music artists with pop music artists for collaborative performance. On her episode, she collaborated with pop band Maroon 5 to sing songs from both artists' catalogs. In September 2008, Evans recorded the theme song to film Billy: The Early Years. Released as a single, "Low" briefly charted on the Hot Country Songs chart. In June 2009, ABC Daytime and SOAPnet sponsored a tour, headlined by Evans, that featured performances throughout the middle of the year. Evans's next single was "Feels Just Like a Love Song", which only peaked at number 59 on the country songs chart. She ended 2009 by releasing an extended play of Christmas music titled I'll Be Home for Christmas. The release coincided with a two-month holiday tour.

=== 2010–2015: Comeback and career re-launch with Stronger ===
In 2010, Evans collaborated with author Rachel Hauck to write The Sweet By and By. Its follow up book, Softly and Tenderly, was released in January 2011. Both novels focused on Christian themes and the main characters explored their religious relationships. Evans also returned to music in 2011. She enlisted record producer Nathan Chapman to help re-launch her career. Evans also started searching for material and eventually found the song "A Little Bit Stronger". The song was co-written by Lady Antebellum lead singer Hillary Scott, who allowed Evans to record the song after that band did not cut it. It was issued as a single in 2010 and topped the Hot Country Songs chart in 2011. "A Little Bit Stronger" became her first number one single since 2005 and spent two weeks at the top. It was released on Evans's corresponding sixth studio album, Stronger. The album debuted at number one on the Billboard Top Country Albums list and number six on the Billboard 200. Stronger later certified gold in the United States.

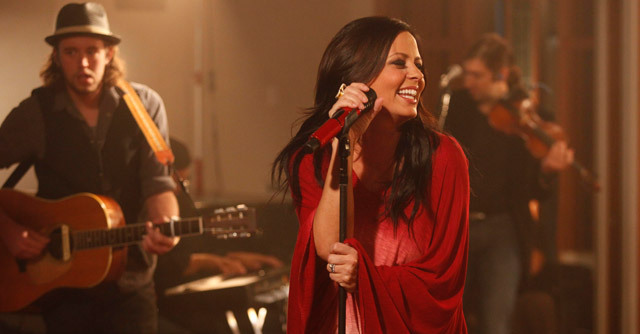
Evans performing on Walmart Soundcheck, 2011

In mid-2011, Evans served as the opening act for Rascal Flatts on their Flatts Fest tour. The duo continued touring through 2012. Also in 2011, "A Little Bit Stronger" was nominated for Single of the Year by the Country Music Association Awards. The program also nominated Evans for Female Vocalist of the Year. The Academy of Country Music Awards also nominated Evans for Female Vocalist of the Year in 2011.

Evans felt pressure to sustain the commercial success from her comeback. "I've worked my ass off," she told Country Music Television. Evans had hoped to have "two or three big hits" off of Stronger. The follow-up single, a cover of Rod Stewart's "My Heart Can't Tell You No", only reached number 21 on the Billboard country chart. It was followed by a third single, "Anywhere", which peaked outside the top 40 in 2012. Evans also released her third novel in 2012 titled Love Lifted Me. The book was co-written again with Rachel Hauck and followed a similar story to that of her previous book releases. Evans also sang the National Anthem at Game two of the 2012 NBA Finals. Evans also sang the National Anthem at the start of Game 2 of the 2015 World Series between the Kansas City Royals and the New York Mets.

In November 2012, Evans went back into the recording studio alongside Mark Bright to prepare for her next album project. A year later RCA released the single "Slow Me Down". According to Evans, the single required more promotion due to the popularity of Bro-country which had taken chart positions away from women. "I did something like forty-four free shows that year, on top of my regular touring dates," her memoir recalled. Nevertheless, "Slow Me Down" peaked in the top 20, climbing to number 19 on the Billboard country songs chart and number 17 on the Billboard Country Airplay chart. (Note: The Billboard Hot Country Songs chart was split into Hot Country Songs and Country Airplay in 2012, with the latter taking the original chart's methodology of only tabulating radio airplay.) Her seventh album of the same name was released in March 2014 on RCA. The album reached number two on the Country Albums list and number nine on the Billboard 200. It was named among the "Best of 2014" in AllMusic's year-end ranking and ranked number ten on Billboard's "Best Country Albums of 2014".

In October 2014, Evans appeared on ABC's Nashville, playing herself. She performed a duet version of her next single, "Put My Heart Down", with Will Chase, who performed in-character as Luke Wheeler. Evans herself helped inspire the creation of the series lead Rayna Jaymes, as the writers consulted with her about her experiences as a working mother in the country music industry so that Rayna's character would come across as authentic. In November 2014, Evans released her first full studio album of Christmas music titled At Christmas. The project featured covers of Christmas songs along with original tunes. She later promoted the project on ABC's annual CMA Country Christmas television special. In August 2015, Evans made a second appearance on CMT Crossroads, this time performing alongside rock band REO Speedwagon.

=== 2016–present: New record label and career transition ===
After spending her entire recording career on RCA, Evans left the label in February 2016. Six months later, she announced that she would be signing a contract with Sugar Hill Records. However the label underwent a restructuring and Evans ultimately decided to leave the contract. In the same year, Evans appeared on the season finale of USA Network's Chrisley Knows Best. She performed a new track called "Infinite Love". The song was a duet with one of the show's cast members, Todd Chrisley. A recording by the pair appeared in 2016 that charted in the top 40 of the Billboard country chart. Evans and several of her siblings also competed against the Chrisley family on the 2016 season finale of ABC's game show Celebrity Family Feud.

Evans had become increasingly frustrated with the country radio's lack of support for female artists. "No one seemed to respect all my previous success that I'd worked years to achieve," she recalled in her memoir. The frustration prompted Evans to launch her own label titled Born to Fly Records. Sony RED partnered with the label to distribute the company's music. "Now I'm in the driver's seat, and every decision is made between my managers and me," she commented. The label released Words, her ninth studio record, in July 2017. All fourteen of the album's tracks included credits from female songwriters. AllMusic's Stephen Thomas Erlewine commented that, "Words offers a sharp and welcome contrast to the bustling digital era." Mark Kennedy of the Associated Press praised the album and concluded, "Artistic freedom has never sounded so good." Words peaked at number four on the Billboard country albums chart and number 46 on the Billboard 200. Despite heavy promotion, its lead single ("Marquee Sign") failed to make a chart appearance.

In 2019, Evans collaborated with her son and daughter to release an EP named The Barker Family Band. The project featured harmonies from Evans and her children performing covers of songs by Aretha Franklin and Fleetwood Mac. A corresponding live album was recorded at City Winery in Nashville. Both projects were promoted through a mini tour that included five show dates in May 2019. In May 2020, Evans released her tenth studio project titled Copy That. The project was a collection of classic country and pop covers from different decades. The album received mixed reviews. AllMusic's Stephen Thomas Erlewine commented, "Copy That is a clever title for a covers album, but it also raises the question of whether these new cover versions are mere Xeroxes of the original." Meanwhile, Jeffrey B. Remz of Country Standard Time found it to be "just too syrupy" in his review. In September 2020, Evans released a memoir that discussed highlights from her life and career. The book was published by Howard Books.

In 2023, Evans competed in season nine of The Masked Singer as "Mustang". She was eliminated during the season premiere alongside Dick Van Dyke as "Gnome". During this time, Evans stated that she started working on her next studio album that resembled neotraditional country sound. In 2023, Evans signed with Melody Place Records. The same year she accepted an invitation to become an official member of the Grand Ole Opry. Her first Melody Place album was issued in June 2024 titled Unbroke. The project chronicled her marital conflicts and reconciliation with her second husband. The album's lead single "Pride" was issued in March 2024. Evans also created her own podcast titled Diving in Deep with Sara Evans which was also released in spring 2024.

== Artistry ==
=== Musical styles ===
Evans has embedded different styles of country music into her songs throughout her career. In her early career, Evans incorporated a traditional country sound on the albums Three Chords and the Truth and No Place That Far. Box Paxman explained, "Evans was hailed for her neo-traditional vocal style and obvious respect for country's past". When Evans released 2000's Born to Fly, her sound shifted towards a contemporary country musical identity. "Born to Fly marks an uptown shift in Evans' musical landscape. With Worley at the helm, the singer has made a much more contemporary record than her previous outings," commented Lisa Young of CMT. Thom Jurek from AllMusic noted a similar theme while reviewing the disc: "Born to Fly emphasizes the more contemporary sounds on the recording, while placing some of the rootsy bluegrass back in the mix."

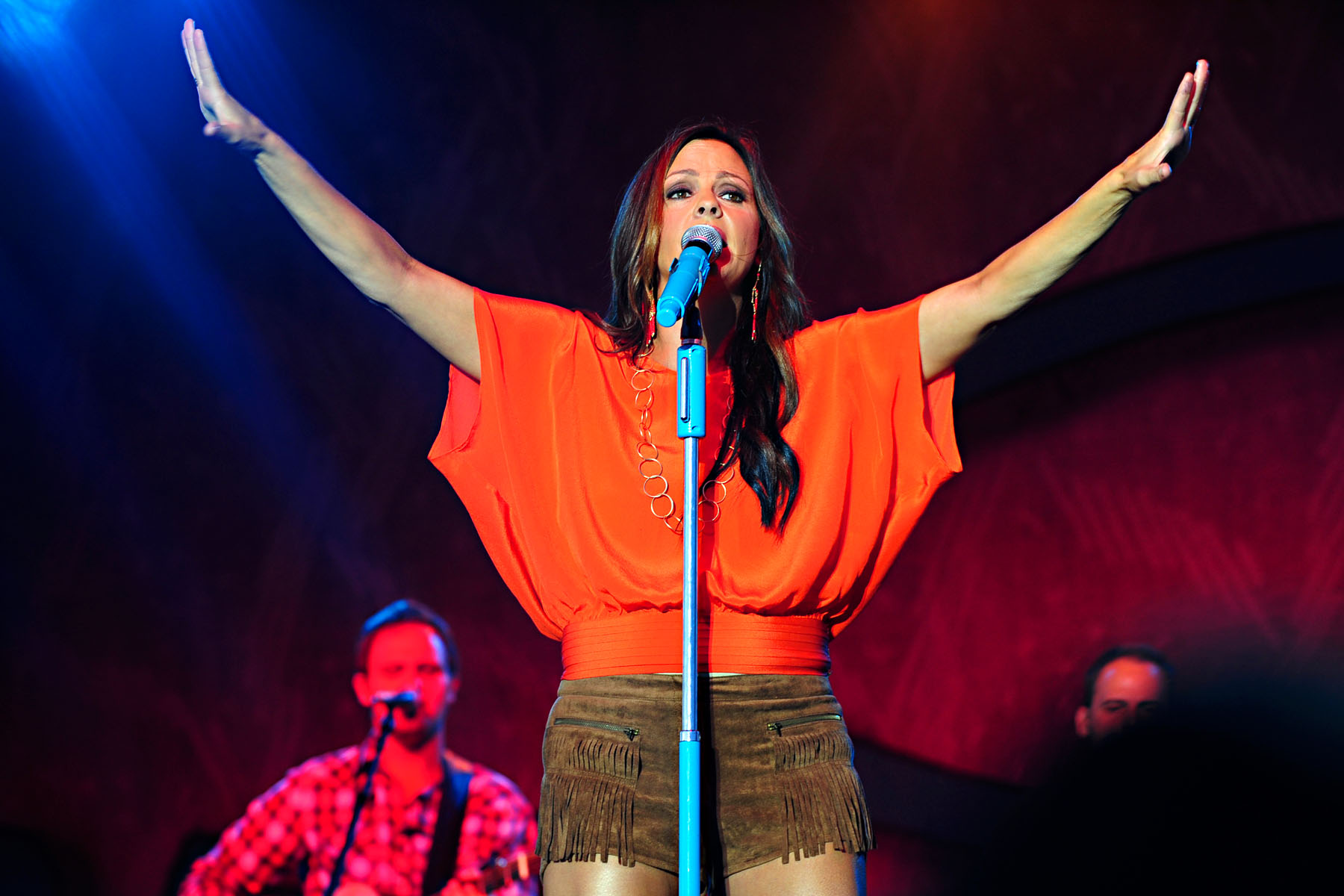
Evans performing for the military in 2012

When the genre shifted back to a traditional country style, Evans followed suit with 2005's Real Fine Place. Writer Jacquilynne Schlesier found Evans to be a "natural choice to lead the parade" considering the acclaim she received from her debut album. Critic Johnny Loftus also found a traditional element to her 2005 transition, commenting that, "Real Fine Place is sure to lure traditional country fans with Evans' rich vocal presence and the album's assertion that the simplest things in life are its truest."

As the genre shifted towards a pop and rock-inspired sound, Evans's music also made the shift. In his review of 2011's Stronger, Jurek highlighted how Evans was attentive to the changing trends: "Contemporary country music has undergone a tumultuous shift in terms of its production style and songwriting trends. Though her life experiences--good and bad--have kept her from recording, Evans reveals here she's been paying close attention." Ken Tucker of NPR found Evans to have fondness for pop and that she found more confidence singing it her later career: "It's undeniable that on her last album, 2011's Stronger, and this new one [2014's] Slow Me Down, Evans has located a new undercurrent of steely firmness that has only strengthened her singing." After leaving RCA Records, Evans began experimenting with other musical styles, particularly on the 2020 album Copy That. Reflecting on her current musical style, Evans commented, "For the first time in my career, I felt like I didn't have to stay in any certain genre". When promoting her eleventh album Unbroke, Evans cited a desire to return to more traditional country sounds and lyrics.

=== Voice ===
Writers and critics have highlighted the power of Evans's voice. Ken Tucker of NPR commented, "Sara Evans is a singer with a big voice who knows what to do with it. Her phrasing is conversational; she rarely tries to goose the emotion in a song by stretching out syllables or leaping registers." In reviewing a live show, Emily Yahr of The Washington Post described Evans as having a "crystal-clear powerhouse twang." Other journalists have noted that Evans's singing has a specific identity. AllMusic's John Bush described her as having "an instantly recognizable contralto" while The Boot wrote, "Evans has built a hugely successful career on the strength of her song choices, as well as her readily identifiable voice."

== Personal life ==
=== First marriage, children and divorce ===
Evans married Craig Schelske in 1993. At the time of their marriage, Schelske was an aspiring musician. In 2002, Schelske ran in the Republican primary for Oregon's 5th congressional district but was unsuccessful. After Evans became commercially successful, the couple moved into a home located in Franklin, Tennessee. They also had a residence outside Aumsville, Oregon, and a residence in Missouri. In 1999, Evans gave birth to their first son, Avery Jack. She had a daughter named Olivia Margaret in 2003, and a second daughter named Audrey Elizabeth one year later. Evans's children are also musical; both Avery and Olivia have performed in her touring band, the former as a guitarist and the latter as a vocalist. Her daughter debuted in 2021, and her son currently tours as part of Thomas Rhett's band. In September 2025, Evans became a grandmother when her younger daughter Audrey and her boyfriend John Headley welcomed their first child, a son.

After her 2006 departure from Dancing with the Stars, it was disclosed that Evans had filed for divorce from Schelske. In court documents, Evans accused Schelske of unemployment, alcoholism, infidelity, watching adult entertainment with their children present, maintaining sexually explicit photographs of himself and others, and verbal abuse. Schelske denied all of his wife's claims. He explained that the "interrupted adult entertainment viewing" was inadvertent and involved both Schelske and Evans. Schelske also claimed that his explicit photograph collection was limited to images of the married couple, and counterclaimed that Evans had numerous personal problems. Schelske accused Evans of having multiple affairs with fellow musicians, including Kenny Chesney. A representative for Chesney called the allegations "ridiculous".

On September 28, 2007, the divorce between Evans and Schelske became final. The divorce agreement established a joint custody plan for their three children, a split of marital assets, and an alimony agreement whereby Evans would pay Schelske at least $500,000 over 10 years. Subsequently, Evans's ex-nanny sued her for $3 million, claiming that Evans had smeared her name by accusing her of an affair with Schelske. The lawsuit was settled in July 2009 for $500,000. Following their divorce, Evans obtained two temporary restraining orders against Schelske in 2010 and 2011, restricting him from making any derogatory statements to the media about Evans or their former marriage.

Schelske also sued Evans's Nashville attorney John Hollins Sr. and his firm (Hollins, Wagster, Yarbrough, Weatherly & Raybin, P.C.) for "slander, false light and other damages" after Hollins gave an October 2006 interview to People magazine regarding Evans's divorce claims. That lawsuit resulted in an undisclosed financial settlement and a written apology from Hollins in 2011, which stated in part: "My firm and I represented Sara Evans in a highly contested divorce from Craig Schelske... to the best of my ability. I regret that my actions on behalf of Sara Evans caused Mr. Schelske harm in any way." Schelske issued a public statement thanking God, family, and friends for staying alongside during the period and stating: "Sara is not my enemy... Hollins... he's the one who did this."

"I was balancing motherhood, a failing marriage, three young kids on the road with me, and an extremely demanding career. I was determined not to let country radio have any excuse not to play me. I didn't see any signs that I was headed for a crash."

— Evans on the events leading to several personal challenges

=== Second marriage ===
Through her marriage counselor, Evans would meet her second husband, Jay Barker. The pair first began exchanging emails in 2007 and started a romantic relationship shortly afterward. Barker was a former University of Alabama quarterback and, at the time of their meeting, was a radio host. The pair married in Franklin on June 14, 2008; their children were their attendants. Barker shared custody of four children with his ex-wife, totaling seven kids when both families were present. "We are truly a family. We don't think of it as 'blended'; they are just our kids. But we also understand our roles. If I'm around when Sara's kids' father is around, I give him his place as their dad," Barker explained in 2011. The family later settled in Mountain Brook, Alabama, which is a suburb of Birmingham.

In 2019, the family returned to Nashville so that Evans could live in closer proximity to the country music business. On January 15, 2022, Barker was arrested for aggravated assault, after he allegedly attempted to use his car to hit Evans while she was a passenger in a friend's car after leaving a party. The arrest affidavit has the couple listed as separated, and that Evans had filed for divorce prior to the incident in August 2021, citing "irreconcilable differences and inappropriate marital conduct". Barker responded on social media to his arrest claiming that the reports "do not adequately capture the full context and complex fabric of our lives". Barker was released from the Davidson County Jail on a $10,000 bond and was scheduled for a court appearance in March 2022. In June 2022, Barker entered a plea deal and was sentenced to a year of probation. Around that time, a divorce between Evans and Barker was "in progress", according to Billboard.

In a March 2024 interview, Evans stated that the couple had reconciled and were living together again. She stated that both of them had been in therapy together (and separately) to work on their relationship. Evans expressed anxiety about how people would view her getting back together with Barker and stressed that her decision to stay with him was not meant as a prescription for any relationship facing similar circumstances.

=== Personal setbacks and challenges ===
Evans has suffered from panic attacks and anxiety at different points in her life. In her memoir, Evans described having a "meltdown" in December 2005 once realizing her first marriage was ending. She recounted having "terrifying thoughts" of being kidnapped and losing control of herself. Evans refused to leave her Nashville home for ten days and was afraid to "walk from one room to another". She was also briefly brought into the hospital and diagnosed with "exhaustion". Evans found solace in her Christian faith and began working with a pastor, who helped her gain control of her mental health. "He encouraged me to just stay home for the time being and get rest and let God do the rest," she remembered. Evans also prescribed an anxiolytic.

In December 2012, Evans was nearly killed in a plane crash in Minnesota. Following a successful takeoff, the aircraft's gyroscope malfunctioned, causing her private plane to fly upside down. "I knew we had not been in the air long, so we were probably seconds from dying. I completely accepted it. It was so strange and peaceful," her memoir recalled. The pilots were able to recenter the plane despite its one wing breaking. The pilots then made an emergency landing in Fargo, North Dakota.

=== Advocacy ===
Evans is a spokesperson for the National Eating Disorders Association and has spoken out widely on this subject. She was influenced to become their spokesperson after having a close friend suffer from anorexia. "Thankfully, I have never suffered from an eating disorder but am well aware of our society’s obsession with body image," she told CMT. She also hosted a charity event, Fashion for Every Body, which featured a fashion show, silent auction, and performance by Evans. A libertarian Republican, Evans showed support for Texas Congressman Ron Paul in the 2008 United States presidential election and was the headliner at his Ron Paul's Rally for the Republic on September 2, 2008, in Minneapolis, Minnesota, the same day as the 2008 Republican National Convention in neighboring St. Paul, Minnesota.

== Discography ==
Studio albums

- Three Chords and the Truth (1997)
- No Place That Far (1998)
- Born to Fly (2000)
- Restless (2003)
- Real Fine Place (2005)
- Stronger (2011)
- Slow Me Down (2014)
- At Christmas (2014)
- Words (2017)
- Copy That (2020)
- Unbroke (2024)

== Awards and nominations ==
Evans has won several awards for her work as a music artist. This includes one accolade from the Academy of Country Music and one accolade from the Country Music Association.

== Filmography ==
Film and television appearances by Sara Evans
Title	Year	Role	Notes	Ref.
Dancing with the Stars	2006	Herself	13 episodes	
CMT Crossroads	2008, 2015	Herself	2 starring episodes	
Nashville	2014	Herself		
Chrisley Knows Best	2016	Herself		
Celebrity Family Feud	2016	Herself		
The Talk	2018	Herself	Guest co-host	
Nashville Squares	2019	Herself	Center Square	
A Nashville Christmas Carol	2020	Belinda Manners		
The Masked Singer	2023	Herself/The Mustang	Season 9 Premiere	

== Books ==
- You'll Always Be My Baby (with Tony Martin and Tom Shapiro) (2006)
- Sweet By and By (with Rachel Hauck) (2010)
- Softly and Tenderly (with Rachel Hauck) (2011)
- Love Lifted Me (with Rachel Hauck) (2012)
- Born to Fly: A Memoir (2020)
