= A Real Fine Place to Start =

Single by Sara Evans

from the album Real Fine Place
- Released: May 9, 2005
- Recorded: 2005
- Genre: Country; pop
- Length: 4:00
- Label: RCA Nashville
- Songwriters: Radney Foster; George Ducas
- Producers: Sara Evans; Mark Bright

Sara Evans singles chronology
"Tonight" (2004)	"A Real Fine Place to Start" (2005)	"Cheatin'" (2005)

Music video
- "A Real Fine Place to Start" at CMT.com

"A Real Fine Place to Start" is a song co-written and originally recorded by American country music artist Radney Foster, taken from his fifth studio album Another Way to Go (2002). Foster wrote the track with George Ducas and produced it as well.

The track was then recorded by singer Sara Evans, released on May 9, 2005, as the lead single and title track to her fifth studio album Real Fine Place (2005) by RCA Nashville Records. Evans's version was produced by she and Mark Bright. It received positive reception and became her fourth number one single on the US Billboard Hot Country Songs chart, spending two weeks atop the chart. The track has been certified Gold by the RIAA for digital sales of 500,000 copies.

== Content ==
Foster's version is played in the key of A-flat major. "A Real Fine Place to Start" is an up-tempo contemporary country song, with prominent electric guitar and steel guitar fills. The song's narrator tells about being in love and getting to know a person from the beginning, describing this as "a real fine place to start."

== Critical reception ==
Deborah Evans Price of Billboard magazine gave the song a positive review, saying "the lyric has a joyful, buoyant take on love, and Evans' voice soars with every celebratory note [...] The last couple of years have seen her hit her stride as a hitmaker, and this gorgeous single should continue that momentum."

== Chart performance ==
"A Real Fine Place to Start" debuted on the US Billboard Hot Country Songs chart the week of May 7, 2005 at number 57, the third highest debut of the week. It rose quickly and was one of the biggest hits that summer. It entered the top-ten of the chart the week of August 13, 2005, becoming her eighth top-ten single. On September 24, 2005, the track would top the chart, displacing Brooks & Dunn's "Play Something Country", becoming her fourth number one single and her fastest run to the top spot. It spent two weeks atop and 25 weeks overall on the chart. In August 2005, the track would receive a Spin Award from Broadcast Data Systems for 50,000 confirmed spins.

== Music video ==
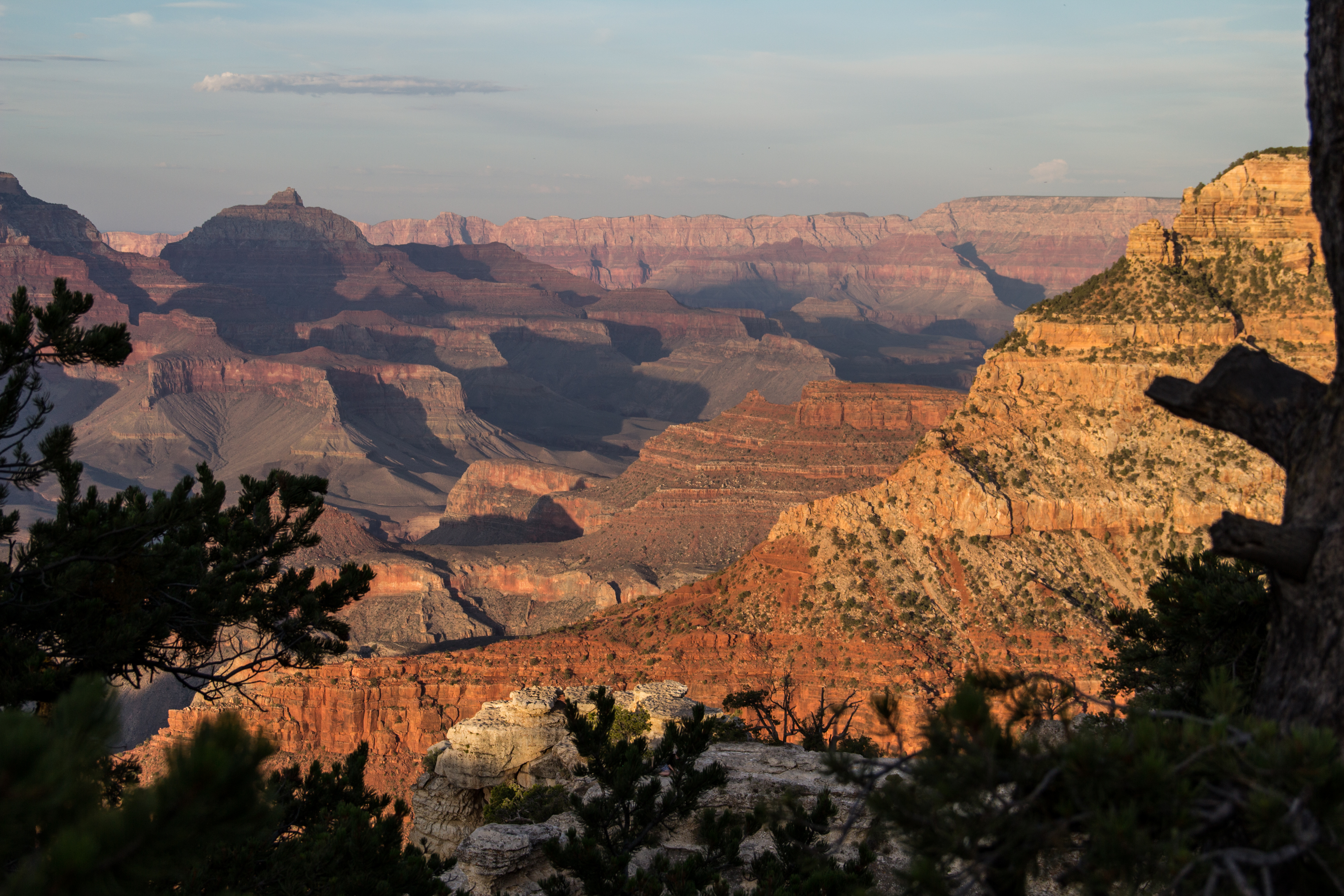
"A Real Fine Place to Start" was filmed at the Grand Canyon National Park.

Peter Zavadil directed the music video for "A Real Fine Place to Start", which was filmed at the Grand Canyon National Park in Flagstaff, Arizona. It premiered to CMT on June 13, 2005. It would reach the top spot of the network's Top Twenty Countdown for the week of October 6, 2005.

=== Synopsis ===
The music video is mainly set in a desert with Evans singing the song in various places around the desert. In the beginning of the video a motorcycle is shown driving along a road in the middle in the desert with a couple in it. The couple then stops on the roadside and the video then shows the two holding hands and sitting on rocks in the desert. The couple exemplifies what the song is talking about. The video regularly shifts between Evans and the couple in the music video. While the video isn't showing the couple, it is showing Evans singing in various places in the desert, including desert rocks and by a bonfire. Towards the middle of the song, the video shows Evans performing with a band at night. The video also shows Evans playing her rhythmic guitar for a brief period of time.

== Charts and certifications ==
=== Weekly charts ===
Chart (2005)	Peak position
Canada Country (Radio & Records)	1
US Hot Country Songs (Billboard)	1
US Billboard Hot 100	38
US Country Top 50 (Radio & Records)	1

=== Year-end charts ===
Chart (2005)	Position
Canada Country (Radio & Records)	16
US Country Songs (Billboard)	19
US Country (Radio & Records)	20

=== Certifications ===
Region	Certification
United States (RIAA)	Gold
