= Pete Riley =

English singer-songwriter and musician (born 1969)

Pete Riley (born 26 February 1969 in Liverpool, England) is an English acoustic rock singer-songwriter and musician. He was the lead singer of the band Treehouse.

Riley moved from Liverpool to North Carolina in the United States in the mid-1990s, where he and his band, Treehouse, befriended Hootie & the Blowfish. Treehouse were the first signing to Hootie & the Blowfish's Atlantic Records subsidiary label, Breaking Records; they released the full-length album Nobody's Monkey in 1997. Treehouse were not commercially successful, and the band broke up soon afterwards. Riley then self-released a solo album, After the Parade.

In April 2001, Riley joined the band of South Carolina singer-songwriter Edwin McCain and spent several years touring with him. Riley appeared on McCain's albums Far From Over (2001), The Austin Sessions (2003), Scream and Whisper (2004), and Lost in America (2006). Lost in America includes McCain's rendition of "Losing Tonight", which originally appeared on Nobody's Monkey.

After his tenure with McCain, Riley moved back to England and in 2010 began writing songs with folk singer Amy Wadge. Wadge and Riley released their first album together, Rivers Apart, on 17 March 2011, and toured the UK in the months following. The duo appeared on BBC Radio Lancashire in May 2011. They released a second album together, Afterglow, in 2012, and embarked on continued touring together.

== Discography ==
with Treehouse

- Nobody's Monkey (Breaking Records/Atlantic Records, 1997)

with Edwin McCain

- Far From Over (2001)
- The Austin Sessions (2003)
- Scream & Whisper (2004)
- Lost in America (2006)

Solo Albums

- After the Parade (2000)
- Falling Over Backwards (2007)

Amy Wadge & Pete Riley

- Rivers Apart (2011)
- Afterglow (2012)
- Bygones (2016)
