= The Austin Sessions =

The Austin Sessions is the name of two albums:

- The Austin Sessions (Edwin McCain album)
- The Austin Sessions (Kris Kristofferson album)
- The Austin Sessions (Caedmon's Call EP)
