= The Masked Singer (American TV series) season 13 =

The Masked Singer
- Season 13
- Promotional poster for season thirteen, featuring "Fuzzy Peas", "Stud Muffin", "Yorkie", "Bat", "Space Ranger", and "Ant".
- Starring: Robin Thicke; Jenny McCarthy Wahlberg; Ken Jeong; Rita Ora
- Hosted by: Nick Cannon
- No. of contestants: 15
- Winner: Gretchen Wilson as "Pearl"
- Runner-up: Andy Grammer as "Boogie Woogie"
- No. of episodes: 13

Release
- Original network: Fox
- Original release: February 12 – May 7, 2025

Season chronology
- ← Previous; Season 12 Next → Season 14

The thirteenth season of the American television series The Masked Singer premiered on Fox on February 12, 2025, and concluded on May 7, 2025. The season was won by singer Gretchen Wilson as "Pearl", with singer Andy Grammer finishing second as "Boogie Woogie", actor Meg Donnelly placing third as "Coral", and singer Brian Kelley placing fourth as "Mad Scientist Monster".

== Panelists and host ==
Season 13 panelists and host

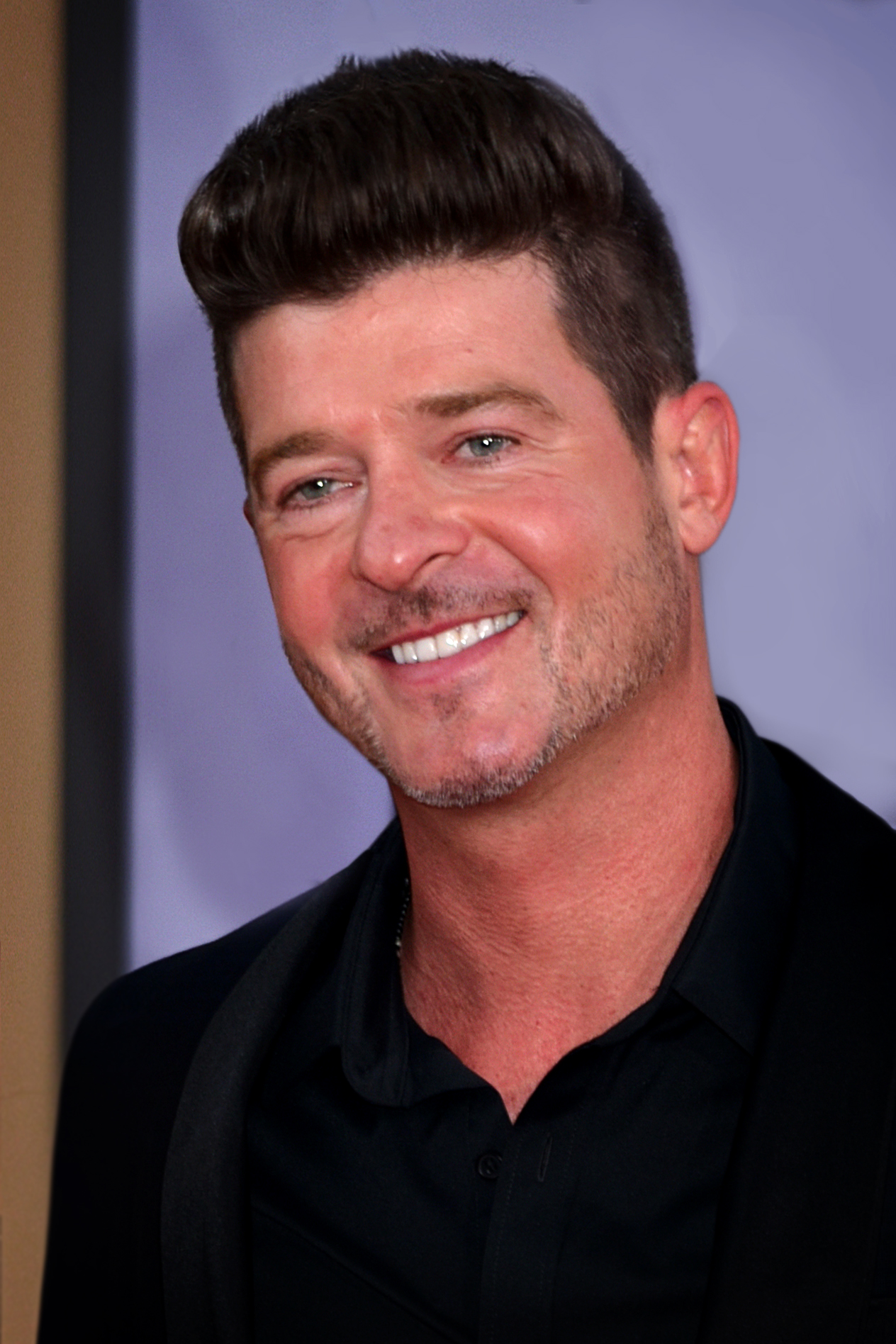
Robin Thicke

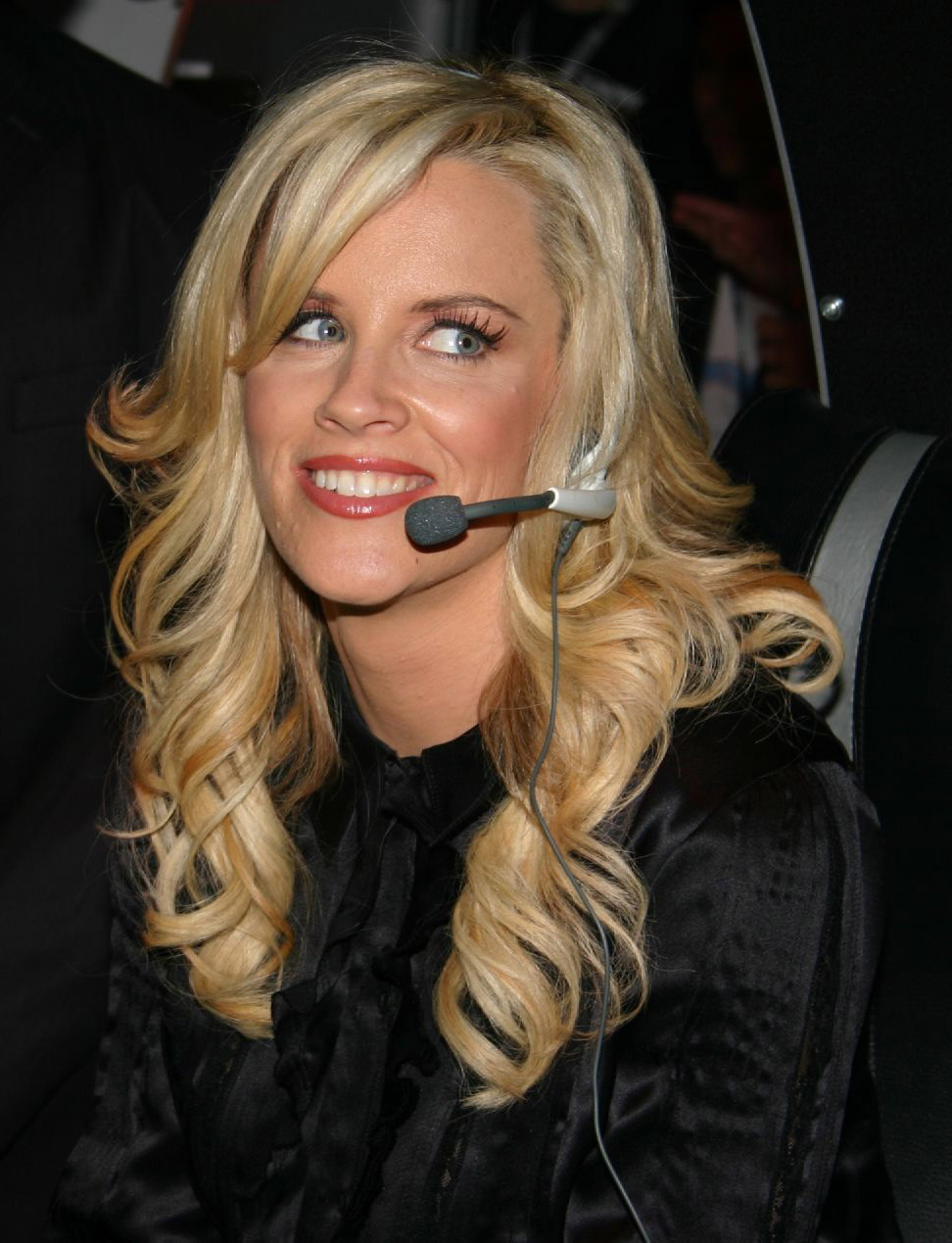
Jenny McCarthy Wahlberg

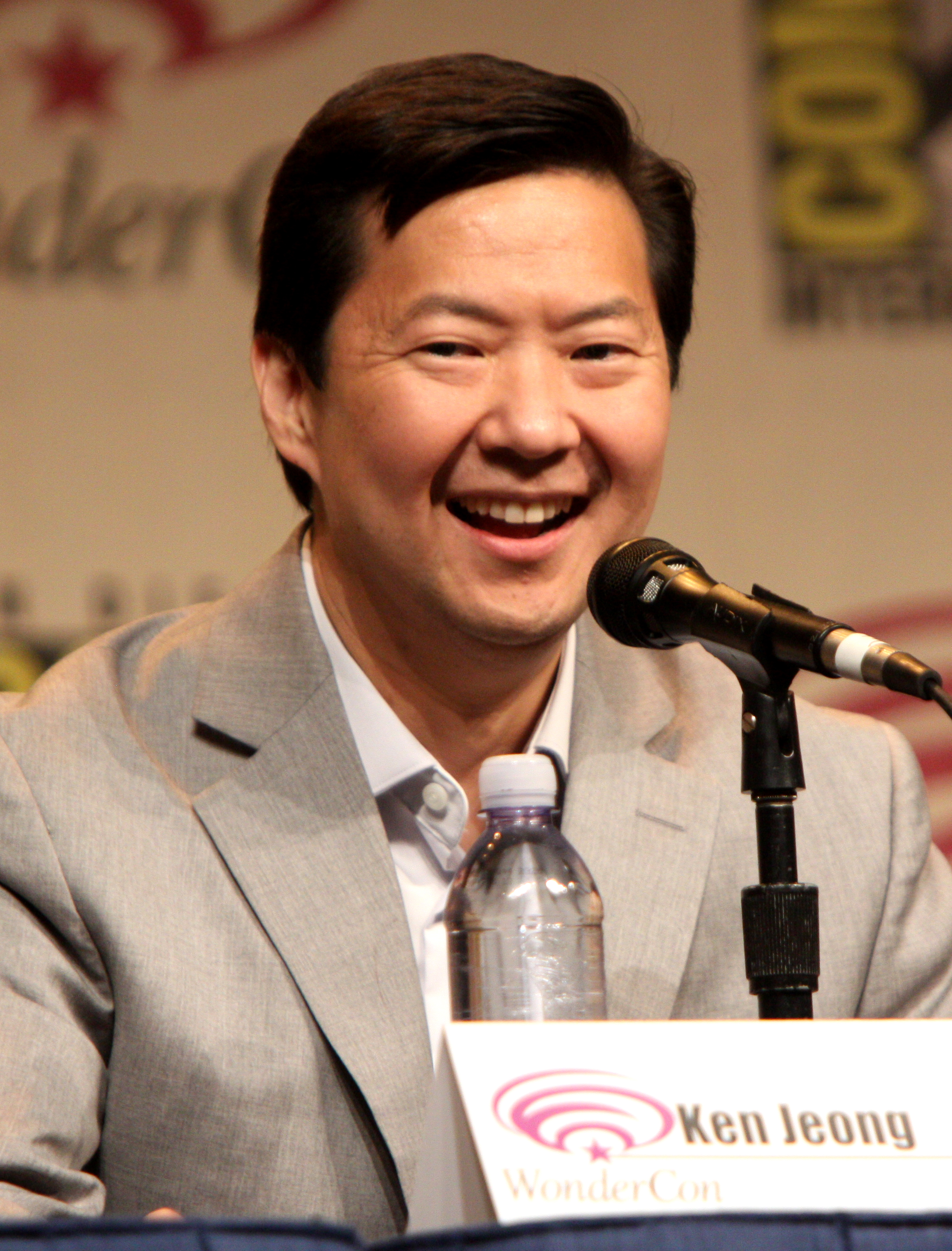
Ken Jeong

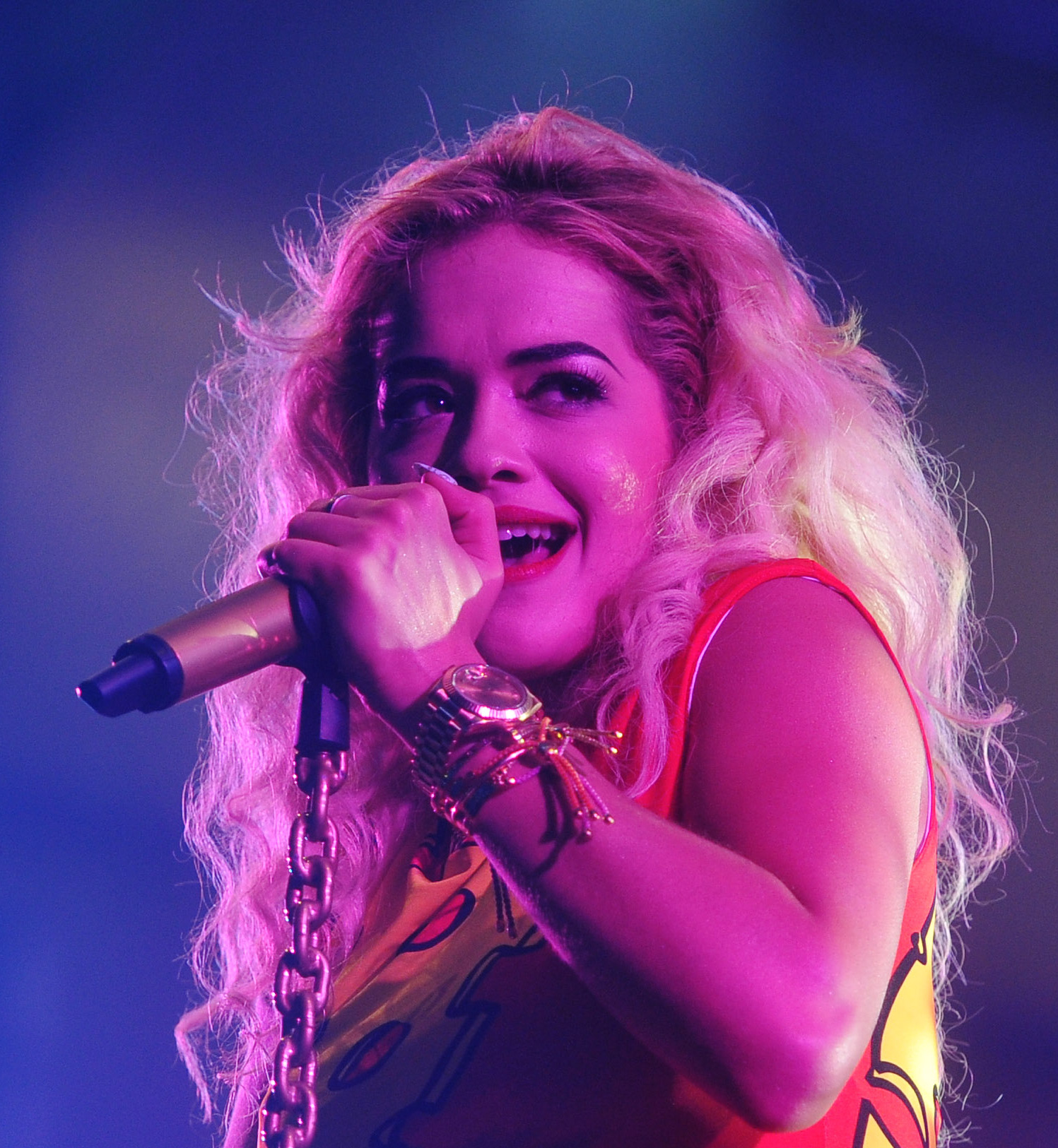
Rita Ora

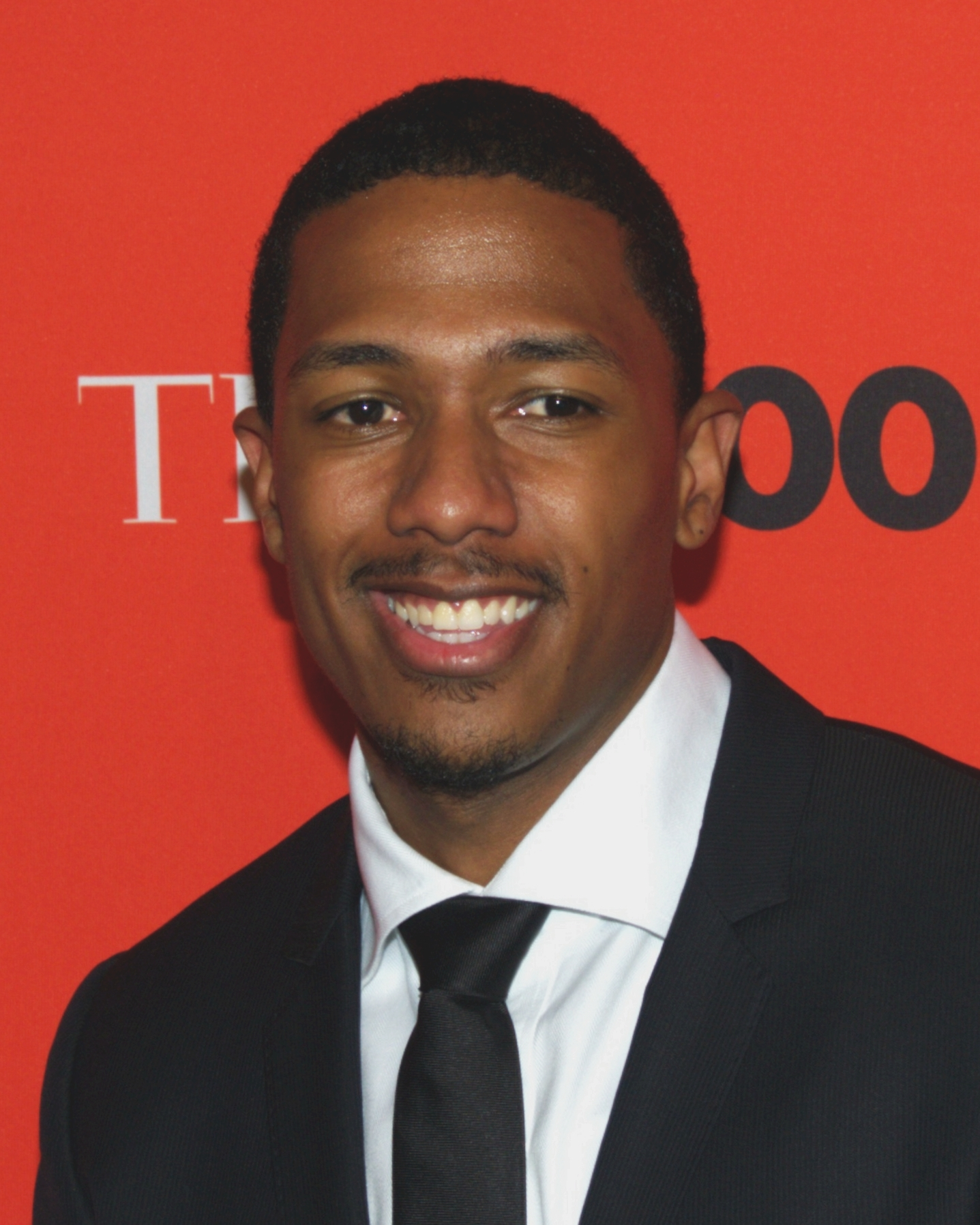
Nick Cannon

Nick Cannon, singer-songwriter Robin Thicke, television and radio personality Jenny McCarthy Wahlberg, actor and comedian Ken Jeong and recording artist Rita Ora all returned from the previous two seasons.

Additionally, "Lucky Duck" was featured throughout the season as a non-contestant costume, similar to "Cluedle-Doo" (who was revealed as Donnie Wahlberg) in the fifth season. Lucky Duck was eventually unmasked in the twelfth episode, and revealed to be Taika Waititi, panelist Ora's husband.

The first episode featured Mario, who portrayed "Wasp" during the previous season, as a special guest. Shrek appears in the second episode. Ernie Hudson and Mckenna Grace, in a pre-recorded segment, appear as special guests during the fifth episode. Casey Wilson appeared during the sixth episode as a guest panelist, substituting for Ora, who was unable to attend the recording. Joey Fatone, who portrayed "Rabbit" in the first season, appeared in a pre-recorded segment in the seventh episode. Chris Kirkpatrick, who portrayed "Hummingbird" in the eighth season, and Omarion, who portrayed "Yeti" in the fifth season, made guest appearances in the eighth episode. Danielle Fishel appeared in the tenth episode as a special guest. Donnie Wahlberg, who portrayed "Cluedle-Doo" in the fifth season, appeared in the eleventh episode in a cameo appearance. Boyz II Men, Wayne Brady, T-Pain, Kandi Burruss, and Jewel appeared in pre-recorded segments in the season finale.

== Production ==
The format was very similar to its predecessor: featuring three groups, with each group having five costumes. Each group goes through three episodes where one contestant is eliminated at the end of each episode. The two left in each group joined together in the 'Lucky 6' merge episode. The panelists had the opportunity to use the "Ding Dong Keep It On" bell, but it was used by Lucky Duck in the semi-finals episode.

Much like the previous five seasons of the series, the thirteenth season featured the return of themed nights. Throughout the season, themes included nights dedicated to the radio show Grand Ole Opry, "Boy Band Night", Decades, Rat Pack, "Voices of Olympus", "Carnival Night" and the film franchises Shrek and Ghostbusters. "Soundtrack of My Life" was featured once again after having already been represented in the previous three seasons.

The eighth episode of the season ended with a dedication to boxer George Foreman who died on March 21, 2025. Foreman portrayed "Venus Fly Trap" in the eighth season.

== Contestants ==
The first five contestants were revealed on January 15, 2025.

The season consists of 15 contestants split into three groups of five, similar to the previous season.

The contestants are said to boast a combined total of 28 Grammy nominations, 13 platinum albums, 150 albums sold, eight Olympic gold medals, four Emmy awards, five Super Bowl appearances and an induction into the Rock and Roll Hall of Fame.

Stage name	Celebrity	Occupation(s)	Episodes												
Stage name	Celebrity	Occupation(s)	1	2	3	4	5	6	7	8	9	10	11	12	13
Stage name	Celebrity	Occupation(s)	Group A			Group B			Group C			10	11	12	13
Pearl	Gretchen Wilson	Singer				SAFE	SAFE	WIN				SAFE	SAFE	WIN	WINNER
Boogie Woogie	Andy Grammer	Singer				SAFE	SAFE	RISK				SAFE	SAFE	KEPT (Note: Prior to the vote following the Smackdown, Lucky Duck entered the stage while ringing the "Ding Dong Keep It On" bell. Lucky Duck then proclaimed both Boogie Woogie and Coral to be safe and advancing to the finale.)	RUNNER-UP
Coral	Meg Donnelly	Actor	SAFE	SAFE	RISK							SAFE	SAFE	KEPT	THIRD
Mad Scientist Monster	Brian Kelley	Singer							SAFE	SAFE	WIN	SAFE	SAFE	WIN	FOURTH
Nessy	Edwin McCain	Singer							SAFE	SAFE	RISK	SAFE	OUT		
Paparazzo	Matthew Lawrence	Actor	SAFE	SAFE	WIN							OUT			
Yorkie	Erika Jayne	TV personality/singer							SAFE	SAFE	OUT				
Stud Muffin	Method Man	Rapper							SAFE	OUT					
Cherry Blossom	Candace Cameron Bure	Actor							OUT						
Griffin	James Van Der Beek	Actor				SAFE	SAFE	OUT							
Space Ranger	Flavor Flav	Rapper				SAFE	OUT								
Bat	Scheana Shay	TV personality				OUT									
Ant	Aubrey O'Day	Singer/Reality TV personality	SAFE	SAFE	OUT										
Fuzzy Peas	Oscar De La Hoya	Boxer	SAFE	OUT											
Honey Pot	Cedric the Entertainer	Actor/comedian	OUT												

- WIN The masked singer won with their performance and advanced in the competition.
- KEPT The masked singer was saved from elimination by the "Ding Dong Keep It On" bell.
- SAFE The masked singer was safe from elimination.
- RISK The masked singer was in the bottom two, but was not eliminated.
- OUT The masked singer was eliminated from the competition and unmasked.
- The masked singer did not perform.
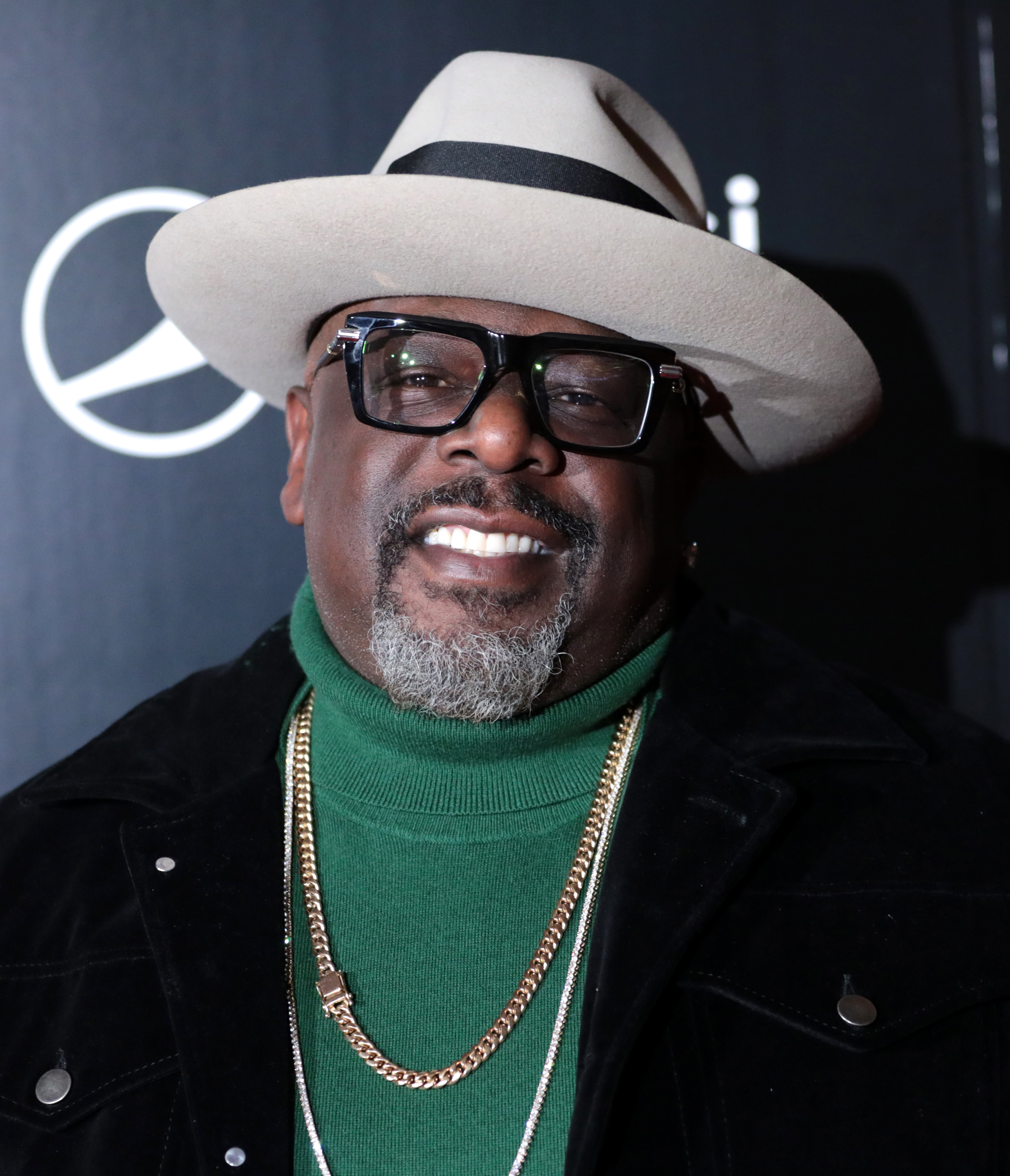
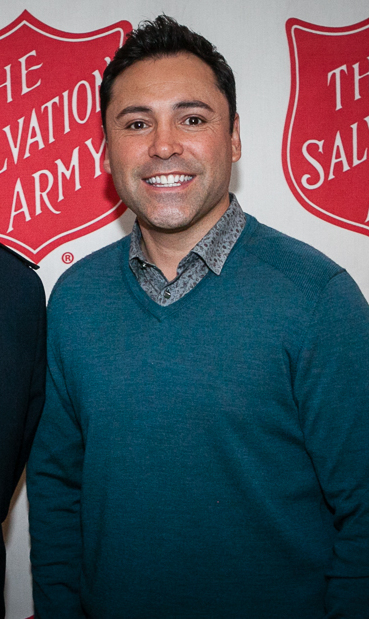
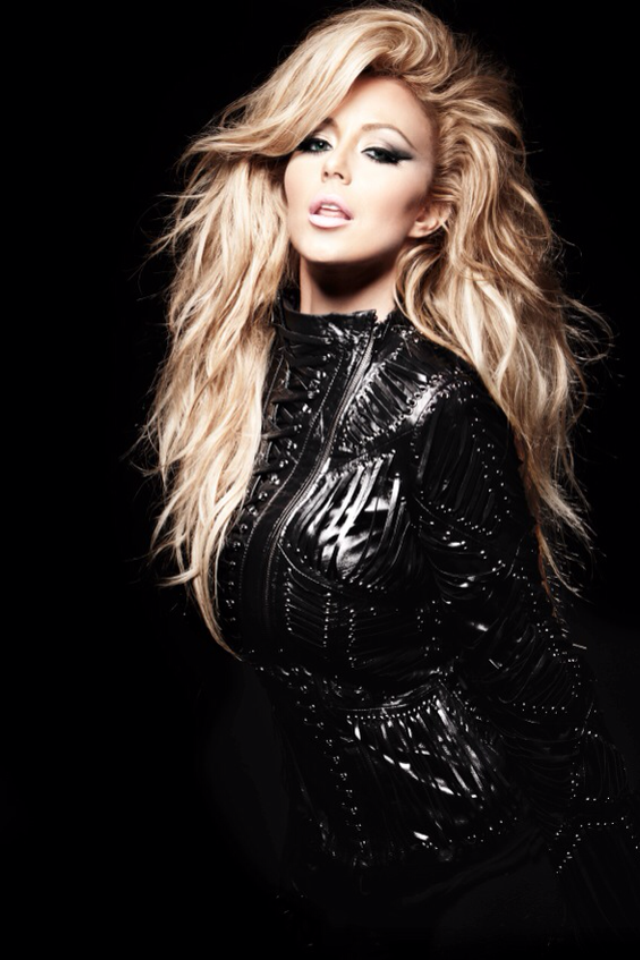
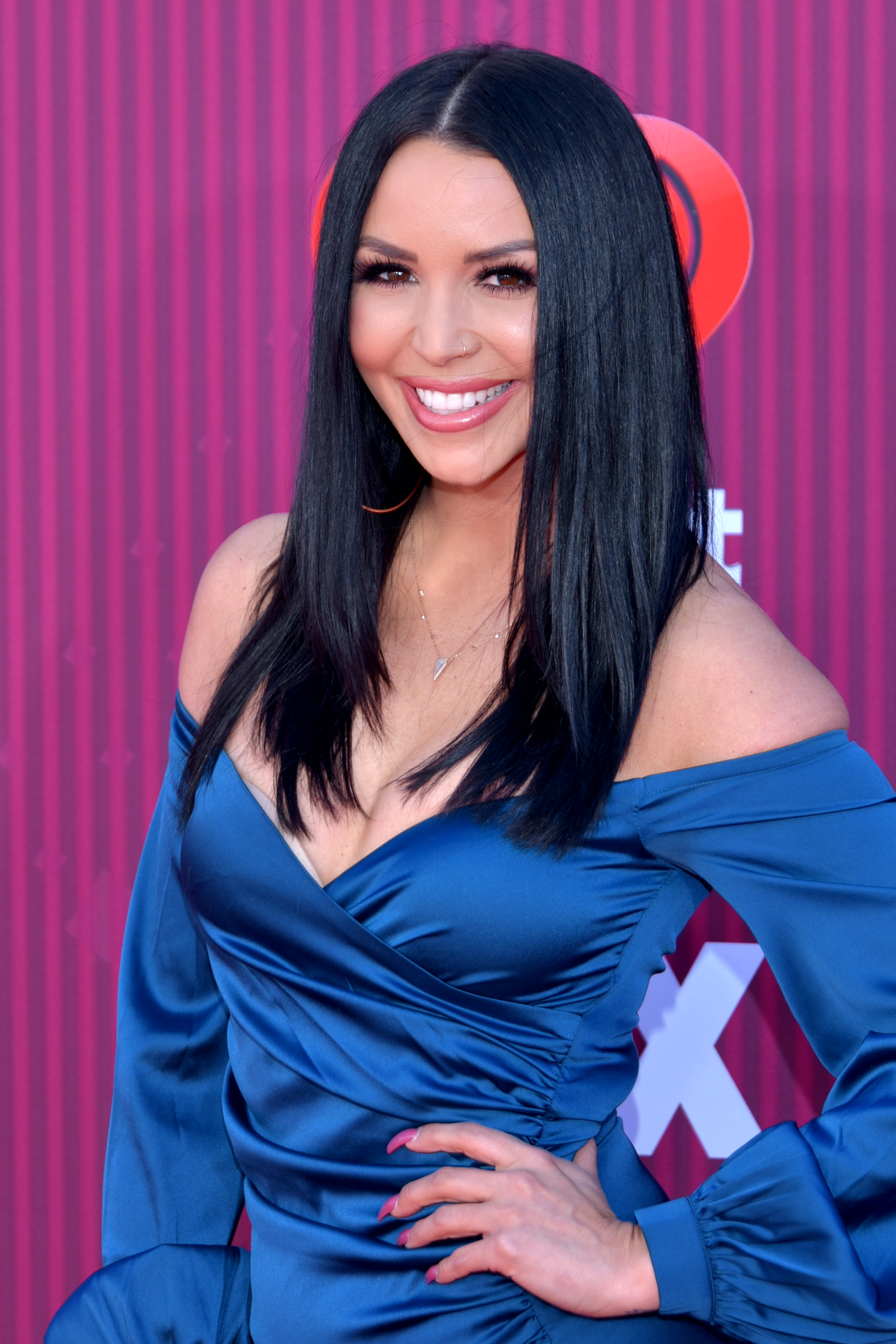
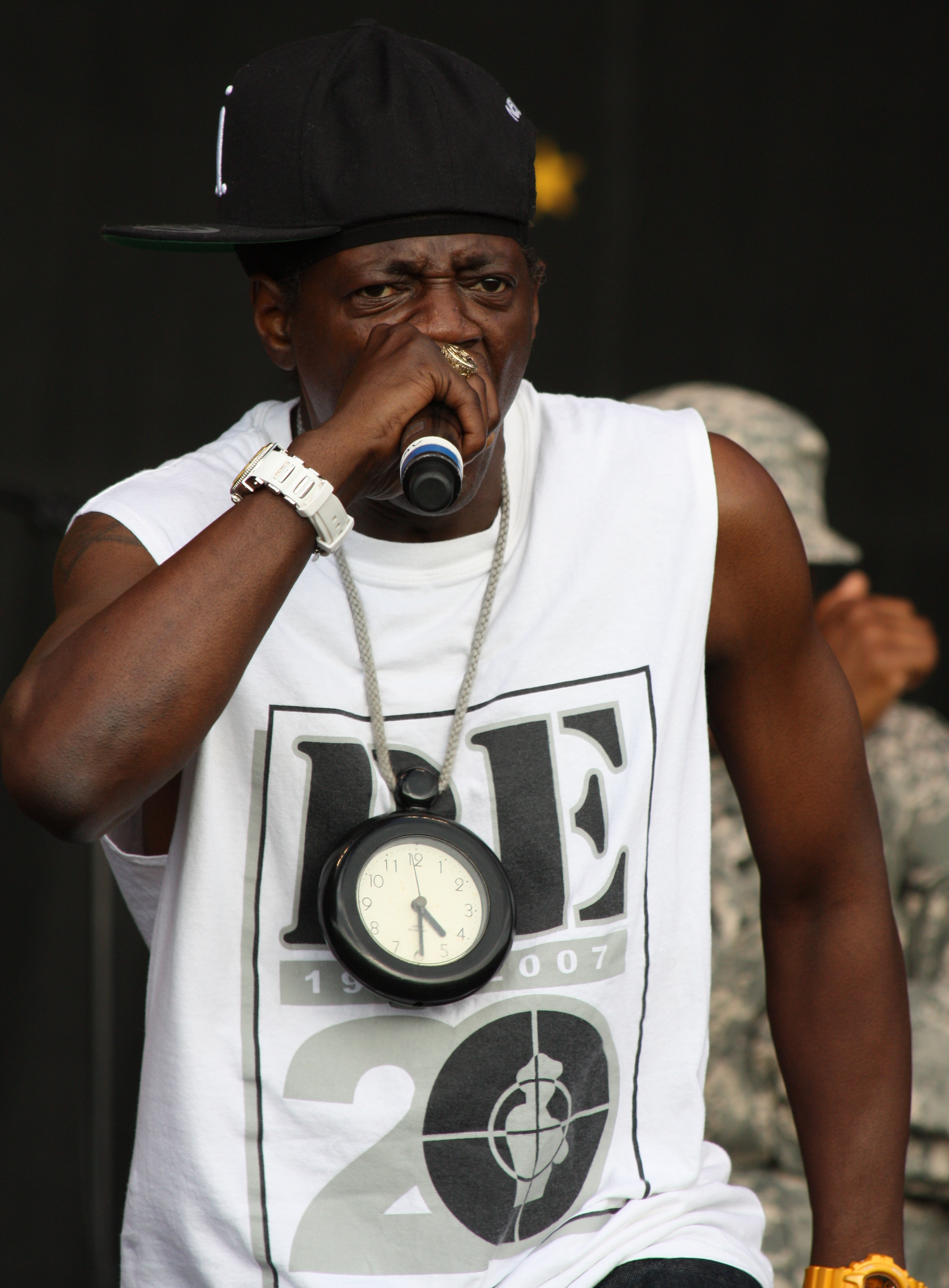
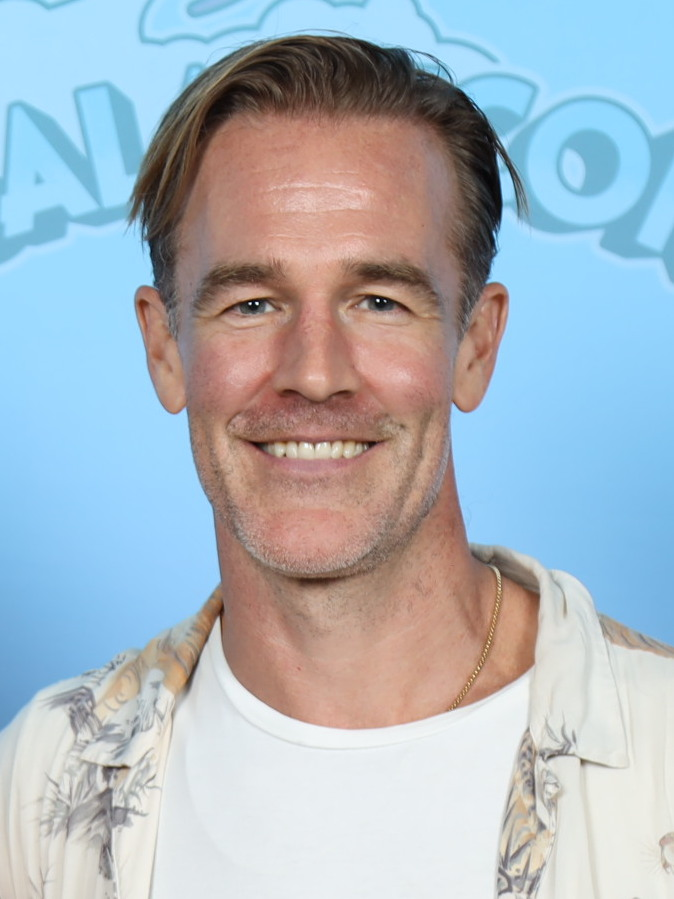
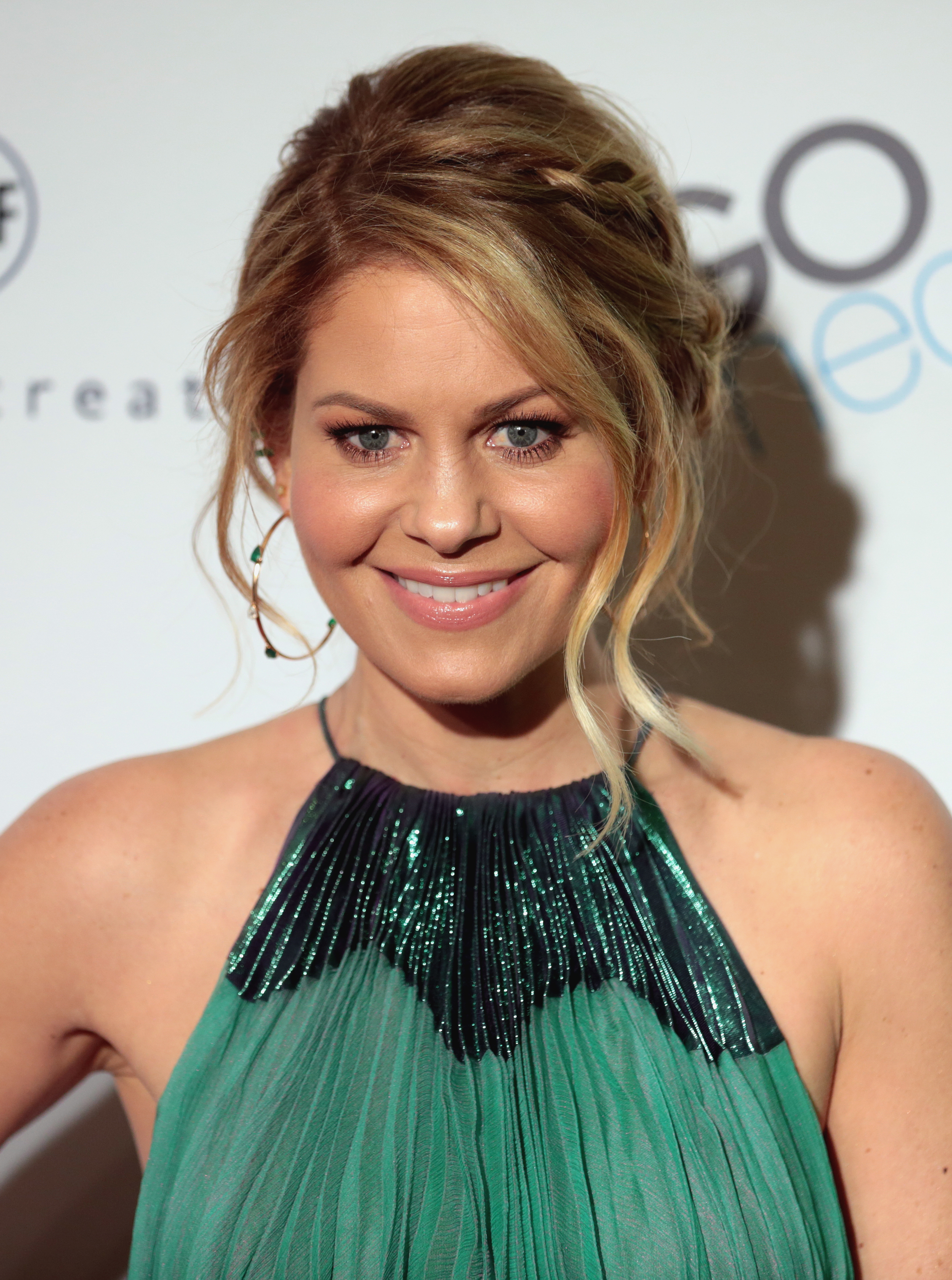
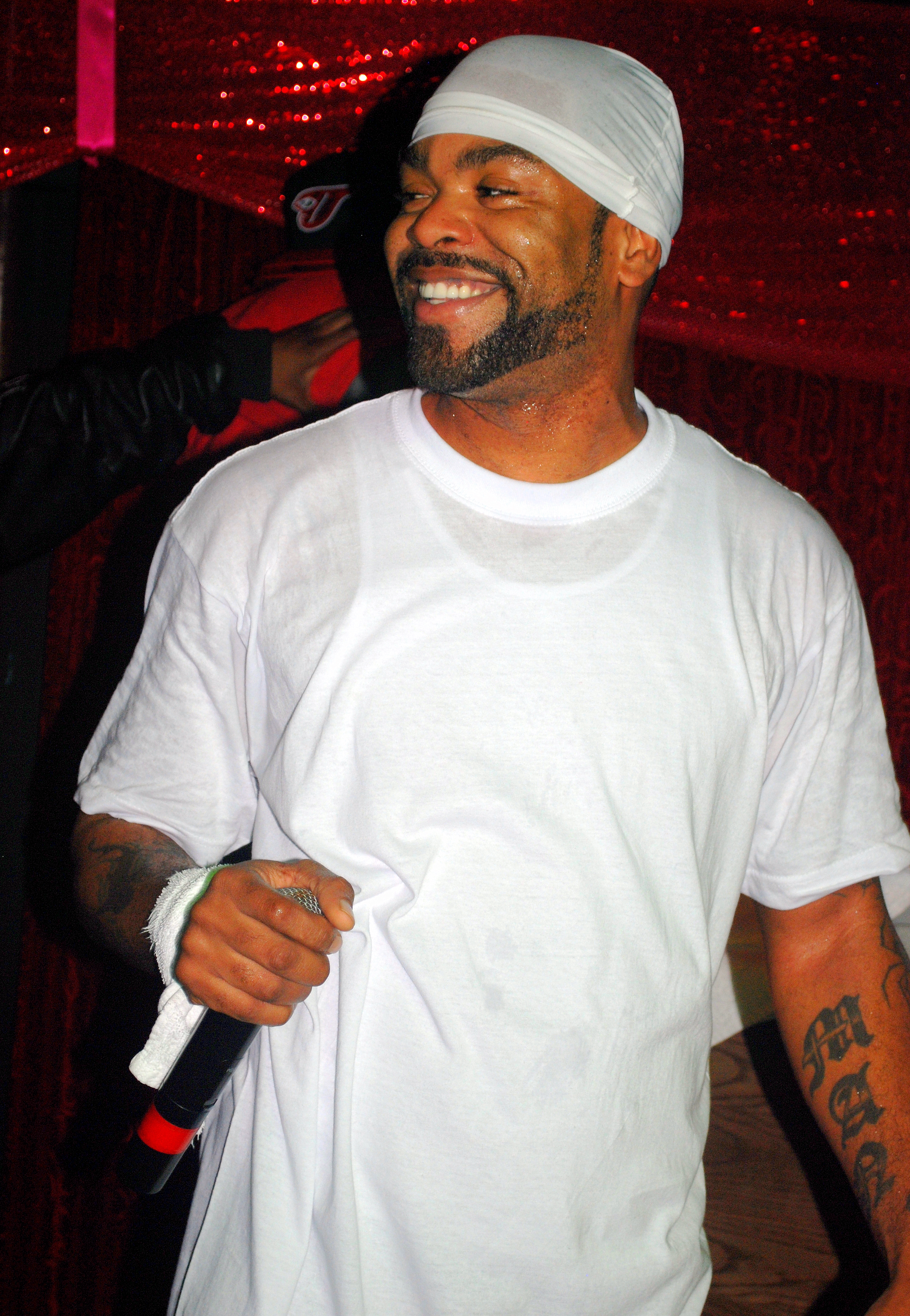
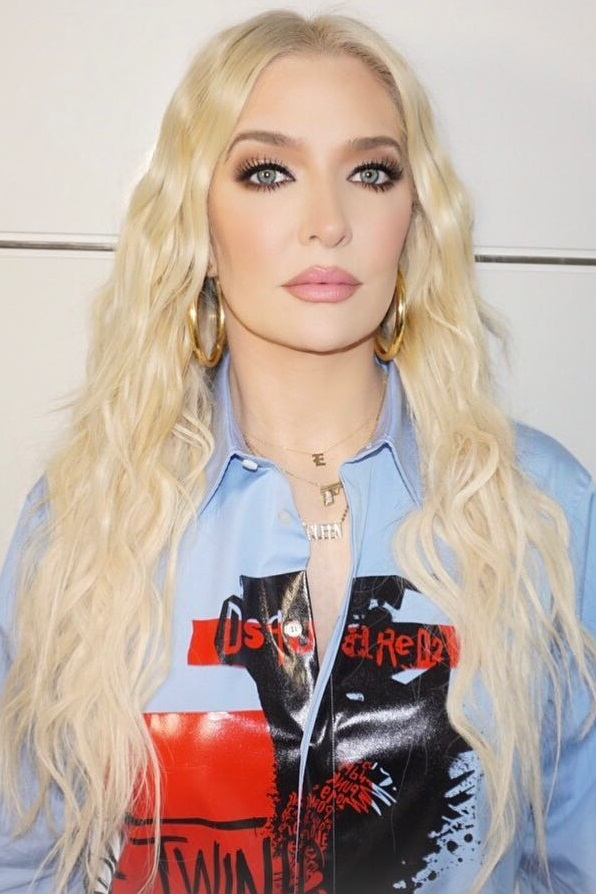
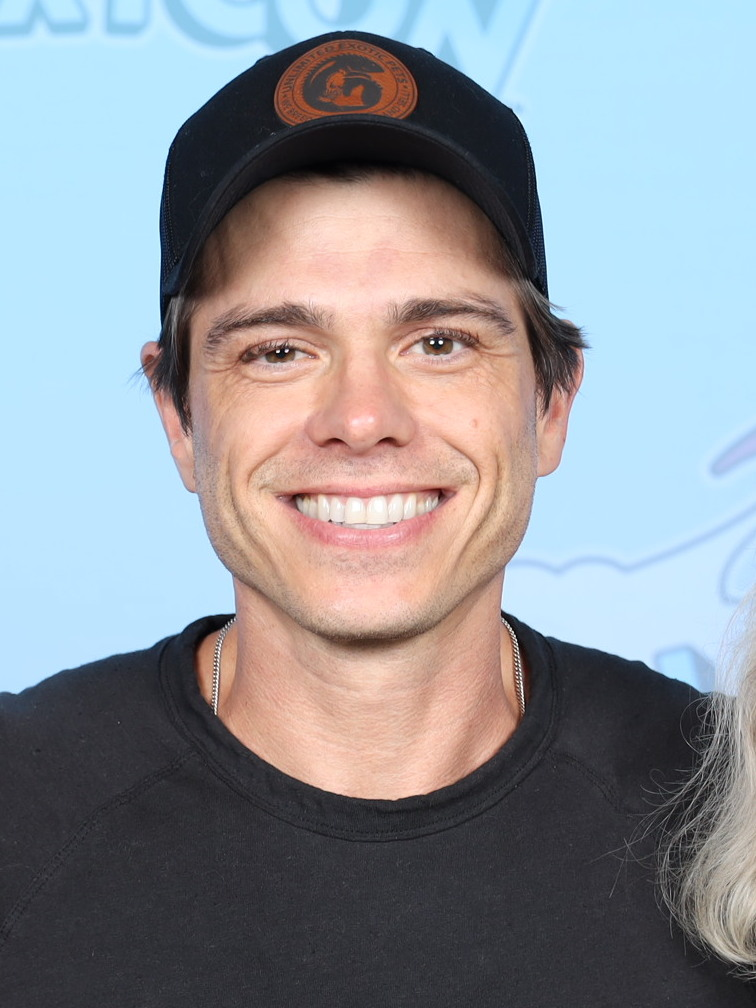
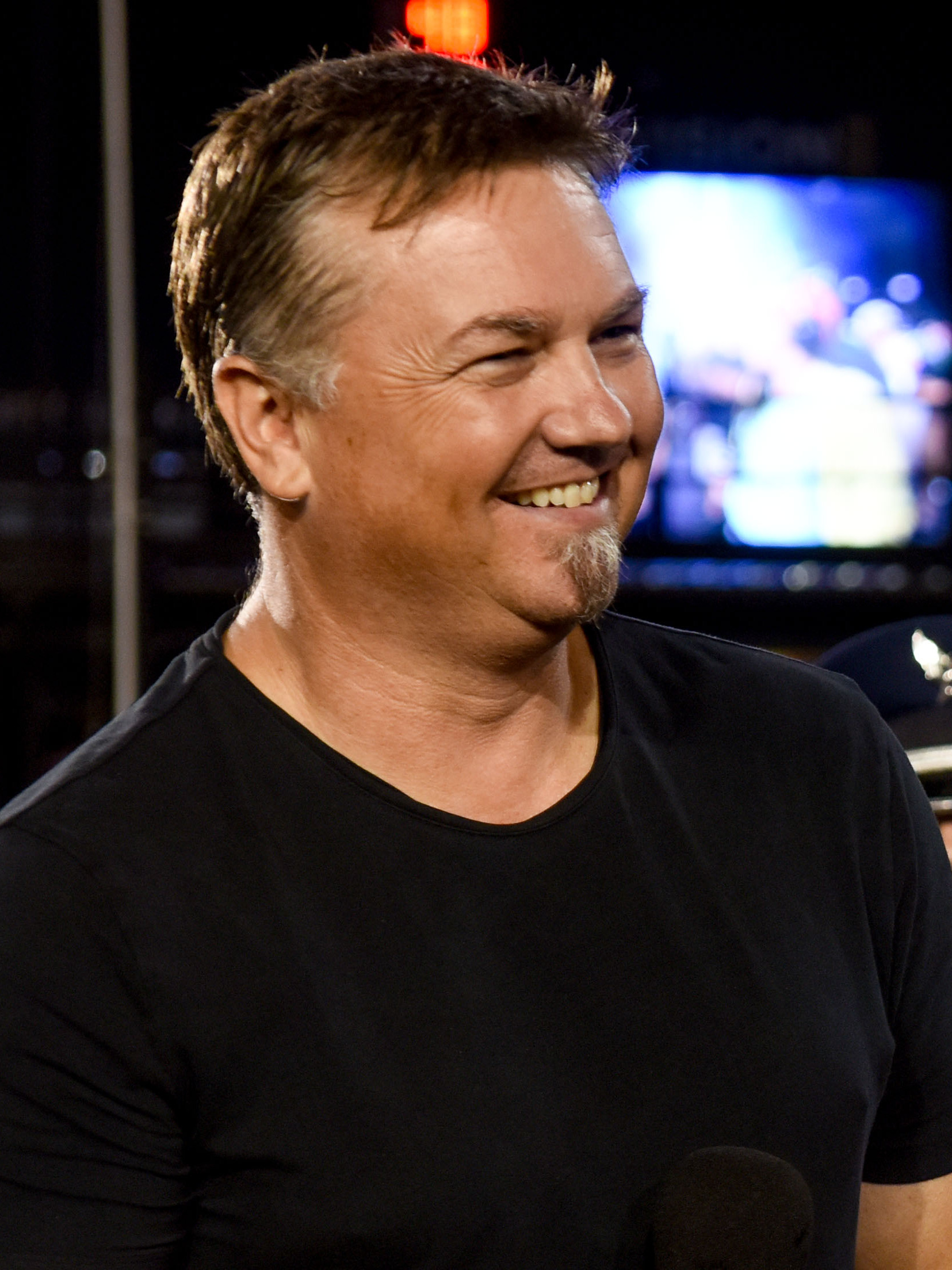
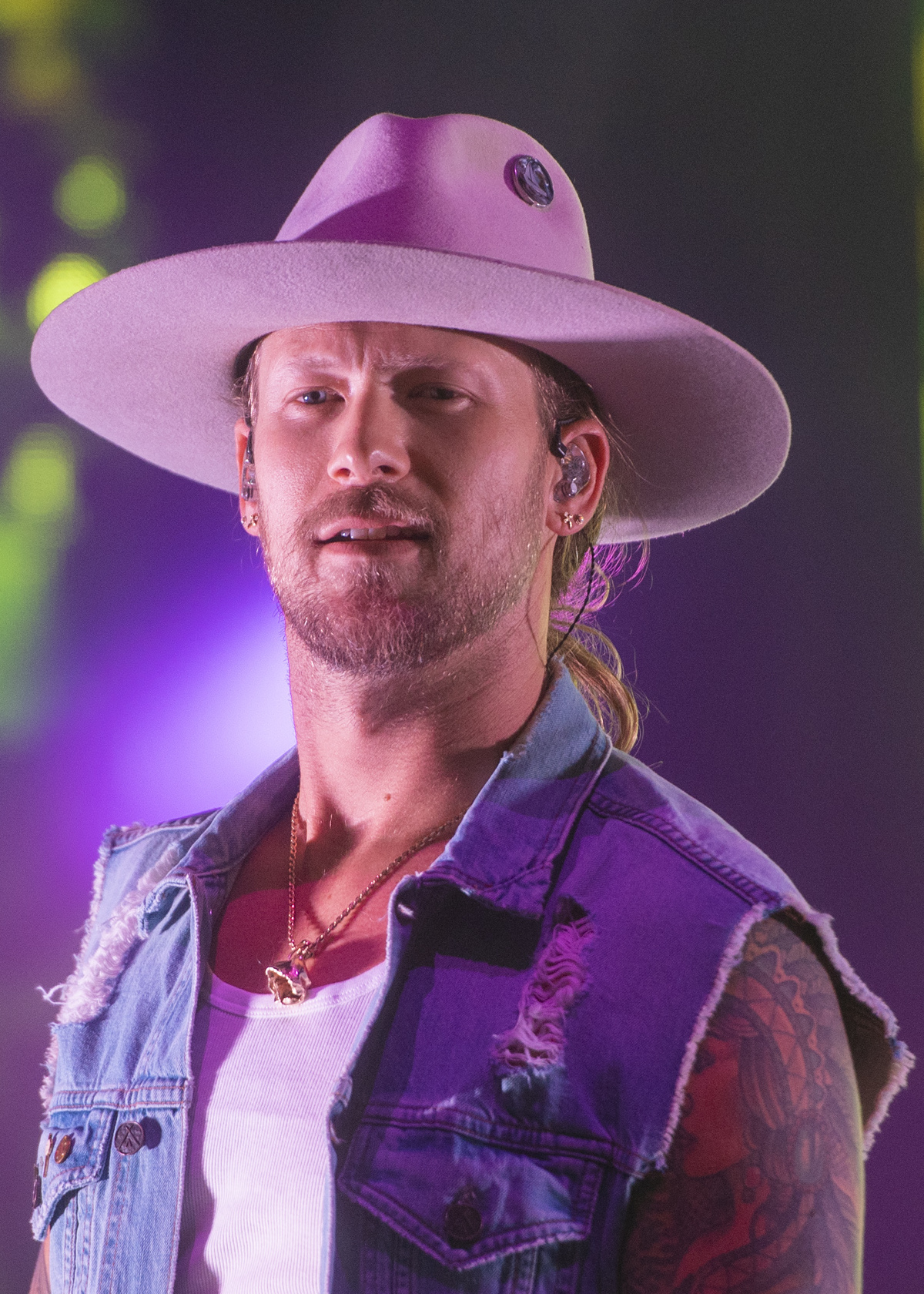
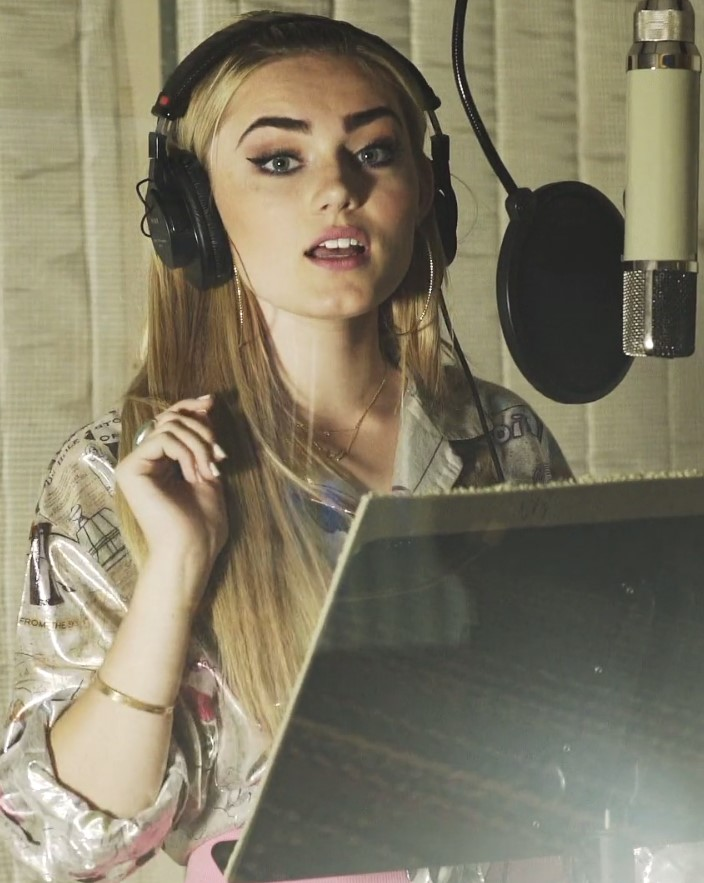
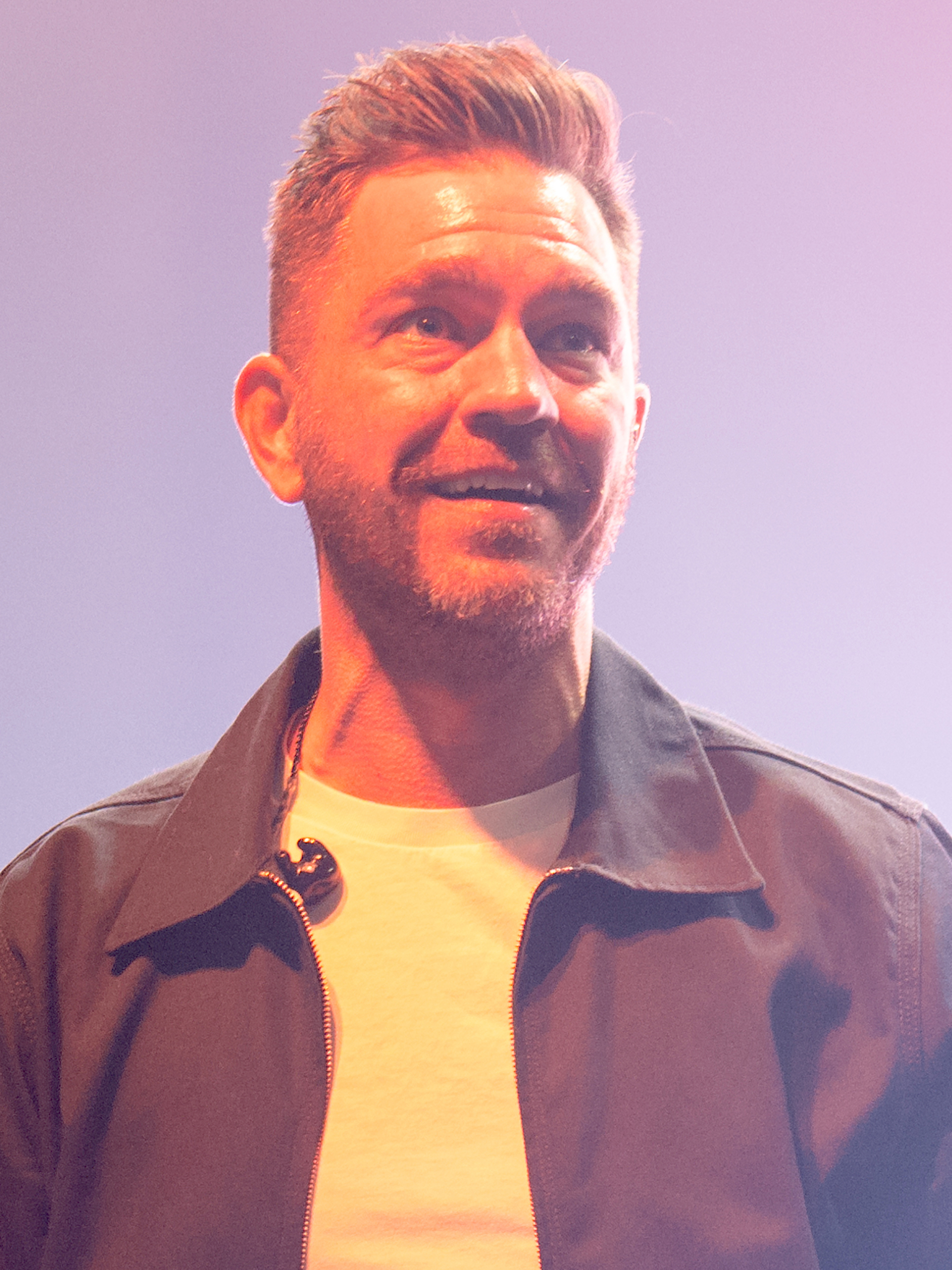
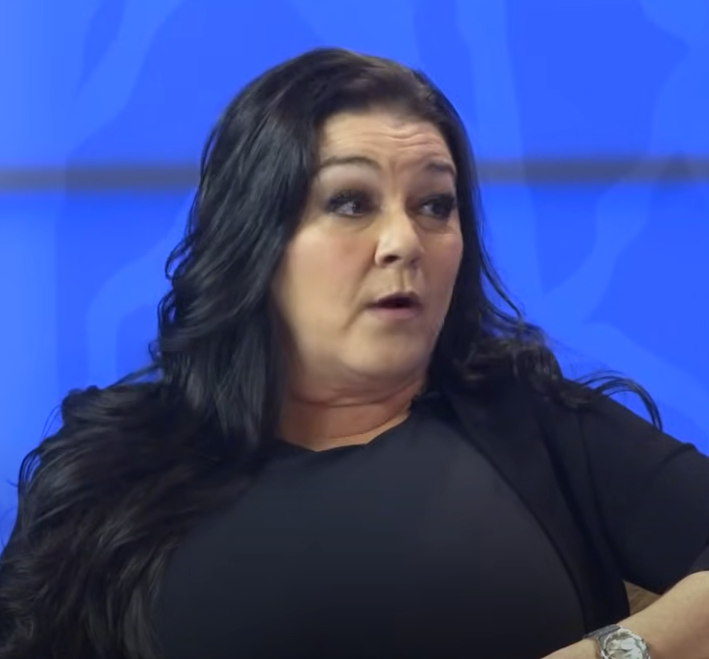
The celebrities who competed in the thirteenth season of The Masked Singer, pictured in order of elimination (L-R):
Cedric the Entertainer ("Honey Pot"), Oscar De La Hoya ("Fuzzy Peas"), Aubrey O'Day ("Ant"), Scheana Shay ("Bat"), Flavor Flav ("Space Ranger"), James Van Der Beek ("Griffin"), Candace Cameron Bure ("Cherry Blossom"), Method Man ("Stud Muffin"), Erika Jayne ("Yorkie"), Matthew Lawrence ("Paparazzo"), Edwin McCain ("Nessy"), Brian Kelley ("Mad Scientist Monster"), Meg Donnelly ("Coral"), Andy Grammer ("Boogie Woogie"), and Gretchen Wilson ("Pearl")

== Episodes ==
=== Week 1 (February 12) - "Lucky Season 13: Group A Premiere" ===
Guest performance: Panelists Rita Ora and Robin Thicke, and previous season runner-up Mario, perform "Get Lucky" by Daft Punk featuring Pharrell Williams and Nile Rodgers

Performances on the first episode
#	Stage name	Song	Identity	Result
1	Honey Pot	"SexyBack" by Justin Timberlake	Cedric the Entertainer	OUT
2	Ant	"Just Give Me a Reason" by P!nk feat. Nate Ruess	undisclosed	SAFE
3	Paparazzo	"The Door" by Teddy Swims	undisclosed	SAFE
4	Fuzzy Peas	"La Bamba" by Ritchie Valens	undisclosed	SAFE
5	Coral	"Mad World" by Tears for Fears	undisclosed	SAFE

=== Week 2 (February 19) - "Shrek Night" ===
Guest performance: The panel performs "All Star" by Smash Mouth

Performances on the second episode
#	Stage name	Song	Identity	Result
1	Coral	"Accidentally in Love" by Counting Crows	undisclosed	SAFE
2	Paparazzo	"Hallelujah" by Leonard Cohen	undisclosed	SAFE
3	Fuzzy Peas	"I'm a Believer" by Smash Mouth	Oscar De La Hoya	OUT
4	Ant	"Wide Awake" by Katy Perry	undisclosed	SAFE

=== Week 3 (February 26) - "Group A Finals: A Rat Pack Tribute Night" ===
Group performance: "Fly Me to the Moon" by Frank Sinatra with panelist Robin Thicke

Performances on the third episode
#	Stage name	Song	Result	
1	Coral	"Luck Be a Lady" by Frank Sinatra	RISK	
2	Ant	"Fever" by Peggy Lee	RISK	
3	Paparazzo	"That's Amore" by Dean Martin	WIN	
Battle Royale			Identity	Result
4	Ant	"My Way" by Frank Sinatra	Aubrey O'Day	OUT
4	Coral	"My Way" by Frank Sinatra	undisclosed	SAFE

=== Week 4 (March 5) - "Group B Premiere: Voices of Olympus" ===
Performances on the fourth episode
#	Stage name	Song	Identity	Result
1	Boogie Woogie	"I Believe in a Thing Called Love" by The Darkness	undisclosed	SAFE
2	Space Ranger	"Bad Blood" by Taylor Swift feat. Kendrick Lamar	undisclosed	SAFE
3	Griffin	"Rewrite the Stars" by Zac Efron and Zendaya	undisclosed	SAFE
4	Bat	"Espresso" by Sabrina Carpenter	Scheana Shay	OUT
5	Pearl	"Saving All My Love for You" by Whitney Houston	undisclosed	SAFE

=== Week 5 (March 12) - "Ghostbusters Night" ===
Performances on the fifth episode
#	Stage name	Song	Identity	Result
1	Pearl	"(Don't Fear) The Reaper" by Blue Öyster Cult	undisclosed	SAFE
2	Griffin	"Disturbia" by Rihanna	undisclosed	SAFE
3	Space Ranger	"Cleanin' Up the Town" by The BusBoys	Flavor Flav	OUT
4	Boogie Woogie	"Radioactive" by Imagine Dragons	undisclosed	SAFE

=== Week 6 (March 19) - "Group B Finals": Grand Ole Opry Night ===
Group performance: "Save a Horse (Ride a Cowboy)" by Big & Rich

Performances on the sixth episode
#	Stage name	Song	Result	
1	Pearl	"Here You Come Again" by Dolly Parton	WIN	
2	Griffin	"Take Me Home, Country Roads" by John Denver	RISK	
3	Boogie Woogie	"Something in the Water" by Carrie Underwood	RISK	
Battle Royale			Identity	Result
4	Griffin	"I Had Some Help" by Post Malone feat. Morgan Wallen	James Van Der Beek	OUT
4	Boogie Woogie	"I Had Some Help" by Post Malone feat. Morgan Wallen	undisclosed	SAFE

=== Week 7 (March 26) - "Group C Premiere: Carnival Night" ===
Performances on the seventh episode
#	Stage name	Song	Identity	Result
1	Yorkie	"Hot to Go!" by Chappell Roan	undisclosed	SAFE
2	Stud Muffin	"Jump Around" by House of Pain	undisclosed	SAFE
3	Nessy	"Roxanne" by The Police	undisclosed	SAFE
4	Cherry Blossom	"Let's Get Loud" by Jennifer Lopez	Candace Cameron Bure	OUT
5	Mad Scientist Monster	"Unwell" by Matchbox Twenty	undisclosed	SAFE

=== Week 8 (April 2) - "Boy Band Night" ===
Group performance: "Everybody (Backstreet's Back)" by Backstreet Boys

Performances on the eighth episode
#	Stage name	Song	Identity	Result
1	Nessy	"Tearin' Up My Heart" by NSYNC	undisclosed	SAFE
2	Stud Muffin	"Poison" by Bell Biv DeVoe	Method Man	OUT
3	Yorkie	"Step by Step" by New Kids on the Block	undisclosed	SAFE
4	Mad Scientist Monster	"I Swear" by All-4-One	undisclosed	SAFE

- After being unmasked, Method Man performed his signature song "Da Rockwilder" as his encore performance.

=== Week 9 (April 9) - "Group C Finals: Decades Night" ===
Group performance: "My Sharona" by The Knack

Performances on the ninth episode
#	Stage name	Song	Result	
1	Yorkie	"Stop! In the Name of Love" by The Supremes	RISK	
2	Mad Scientist Monster	"Love Yourself" by Justin Bieber	WIN	
3	Nessy	"Can't Fight This Feeling" by REO Speedwagon	RISK	
Battle Royale			Identity	Result
4	Yorkie	"Hard to Handle" by Otis Redding	Erika Jayne	OUT
4	Nessy	"Hard to Handle" by Otis Redding	undisclosed	SAFE

=== Week 10 (April 16) - "The Lucky 6: Merging of the Masks" ===
Performances on the tenth episode
#	Stage name	Song	Identity	Result
1	Mad Scientist Monster	"There's Nothing Holdin' Me Back" by Shawn Mendes	undisclosed	SAFE
2	Nessy	"Stargazing" by Myles Smith	undisclosed	SAFE
3	Coral	"Ain't It Fun" by Paramore	undisclosed	SAFE
4	Paparazzo	"Unpretty" by TLC	Matthew Lawrence	OUT
5	Pearl	"Conga" by Gloria Estefan and Miami Sound Machine	undisclosed	SAFE
6	Boogie Woogie	"Unsteady" by X Ambassadors	undisclosed	SAFE

=== Week 11 (April 23) - "Quarter Finals: Soundtrack Of My Life Night" ===
Group performance: "More Than a Feeling" by Boston

Performances on the eleventh episode
#	Stage name	Song	Identity	Result
1	Coral	"Sk8er Boi" by Avril Lavigne	undisclosed	SAFE
2	Nessy	"Million Reasons" by Lady Gaga	Edwin McCain	OUT
3	Boogie Woogie	"Golden Hour" by Jvke	undisclosed	SAFE
4	Pearl	"Your Love" by The Outfield	undisclosed	SAFE
5	Mad Scientist Monster	"The Scientist" by Coldplay	undisclosed	SAFE

- After being unmasked, McCain performed his signature song "I'll Be" as his encore performance.

=== Week 12 (April 30) - "The Semi-Finals: Head-To-Head Battles" ===
Group performance: "HandClap" by Fitz and the Tantrums

Performances on the twelfth episode
#	Stage name	Song	Result
1	Boogie Woogie	"Maps" by Maroon 5	RISK
2	Pearl	"You Don't Own Me" by Lesley Gore	WIN
3	Coral	"What Was I Made For?" by Billie Eilish	RISK
4	Mad Scientist Monster	"A Bar Song (Tipsy)" by Shaboozey	WIN
Smackdown			Result
5	Coral	"Suddenly I See" by KT Tunstall	KEPT
5	Boogie Woogie	"Are You Gonna Be My Girl" by Jet	KEPT

=== Week 13 (May 7) - "The Two-Hour Lucky Season 13 Finale" ===
Group performance: "Pink Pony Club" by Chappell Roan with panelist Rita Ora

Performances on the thirteenth episode
#	Stage name	Song	Identity	Result
Round 1
1	Pearl	"Black Horse and the Cherry Tree" by KT Tunstall	undisclosed	SAFE
2	Coral	"Moon River" by Audrey Hepburn	Meg Donnelly	THIRD PLACE
3	Boogie Woogie	"Freedom! '90" by George Michael	undisclosed	SAFE
4	Mad Scientist Monster	"Stay" by Sugarland	Brian Kelley	FOURTH PLACE
Round 2
5	Boogie Woogie	"Love the Hell Out of You" by Lewis Capaldi	Andy Grammer	RUNNER-UP
6	Pearl	"I'll Stand by You" by The Pretenders	Gretchen Wilson	WINNER

- After being unmasked, Grammer performed his signature song "Don't Give Up on Me" as his encore performance, and Wilson performed her signature song "Redneck Woman" as her encore performance.

== Ratings ==
Viewership and ratings per episode of The Masked Singer (American TV series) season 13
No.	Title	Air date	Rating/share (18–49)	Viewers (millions)	Ref.
1	"Lucky Season 13: Group A Premiere"	February 12, 2025	0.4/5	3.06	
2	"Shrek Night"	February 19, 2025	0.4/6	3.02	
3	"Group A Finals: A Rat Pack Tribute Night"	February 26, 2025	0.4/5	2.93	
4	"Group B Premiere: Voices of Olympus"	March 5, 2025	0.3/5	2.61	
5	"Ghostbusters Night"	March 12, 2025	0.4/5	2.90	
6	"Group B Finals"	March 19, 2025	0.4/5	2.61	
7	"Group C Premiere: Carnival Night"	March 26, 2025	0.3/5	2.67	
8	"Boy Band Night"	April 2, 2025	0.3/4	2.85	
9	"Group C Finals: Decades Night"	April 9, 2025	0.3/4	3.02	
10	"The Lucky 6: Merging of the Masks"	April 16, 2025	0.4/6	2.84	
11	"Quarter Finals: Soundtrack Of My Life Night"	April 23, 2025	0.4/5	2.79	
12	"The Semi-Finals: Head-To-Head Battles"	April 30, 2025	0.3/4	2.75	
13	"The Two-Hour Lucky Season 13 Finale"	May 7, 2025	0.4/5	2.89	
