= Far from Over =

Far from Over may refer to:

- Far from Over (Edwin McCain album), 2001
- Far from Over (Vijay Iyer album), 2017
- Far from Over, an EP by Frankmusik
- "Far from Over" (song), a song by Frank Stallone for the 1983 film Staying Alive
- "Far from Over", a song by Rev Theory from the album Light It Up
- "Far from Over", song by Anthony Callea from A New Chapter
- "Far from Over", a 1999 song by Kamaya Painters
- Far from Over, a 2000 novel by Sheila O'Flanagan
