= Tonight (Sara Evans song) =

Single by Sara Evans

from the album Restless
- Released: December 2, 2004
- Studio: Money Pit Studios; Paragon Studios
- Genre: Country; country pop; contemporary country
- Length: 5:26 (album version); 3:59 (single version)
- Label: RCA Nashville
- Songwriters: Bonnie Baker; Troy Johnson
- Producers: Sara Evans; Paul Worley

Sara Evans singles chronology
"Suds in the Bucket" (2004)	"Tonight" (2004)	"A Real Fine Place to Start" (2005)

"Tonight" is a song written by Bonnie Baker and Troy Johnson. It was originally recorded by American country artist Sara Evans for her 2003 studio album, Restless. In 2004, it was released as the fourth (and final) single from the album, becoming a minor hit on the Billboard country songs chart.

== Background, content and release ==
By 2003 when Sara Evans released her fourth studio album, she had two number one singles and several other major hits. Unlike her previous releases, the album centered on contemporary country and country pop styles. Evidence of this was demonstrated in album tracks, including "Tonight." Ben Foster of Country Universe called "Tonight" an "excellent, underrated single" that could be compared to other Evans hits such as "Fool, I'm a Woman" and "Coalmine." "Tonight" was recorded between 2002 and 2003 at Money Pit Studios and Paragon Studios. The song was co-produced by Evans and Paul Worley. Both Worley and Evans collaborated previously on her 2001 release, Born to Fly.

"Tonight" was spawned as the fourth and final single from Evans's Restless album. It was issued as a single via RCA Nashville on December 2, 2004. The song spent 14 weeks on the Billboard Hot Country Singles and reached a peak position of 41 on the list. "Tonight" was Evans's first single since 1998 to chart outside the Billboard country songs top 40.

== Track listing ==
CD single

- "Tonight" (single edit) – 3:59
- "Tonight" (single edit) – 3:59

== Charts ==
Chart (2004–2005)	Peak position
US Hot Country Songs (Billboard)	41
