= Why Should I Care =

Why Should I Care may refer to:

- "Why Should I Care", a song recorded by Toni Braxton from the album Secrets (Toni Braxton album)
- "Why Should I Care", a song recorded by Diana Krall from the album When I Look in Your Eyes
- "Why Should I Care", a song recorded by Sara Evans from the album Born to Fly
