= I Could Not Ask for More =

1999 single by Edwin McCain

Single by Edwin McCain

from the album Messenger
- Released: May 25, 1999
- Studio: Tree Sound (Atlanta, Georgia); Cello (Los Angeles)
- Length: 4:36 (album version); 4:09 (radio edit)
- Label: Atlantic; Lava
- Songwriter: Diane Warren
- Producer: Matt Serletic

Edwin McCain singles chronology
"What Matters" (1998)	"I Could Not Ask for More" (1999)	"Go Be Young" (2000)

"I Could Not Ask for More" is a song by American singer-songwriter Edwin McCain for the soundtrack of the 1999 romantic drama film Message in a Bottle. It was also included in his third studio album Messenger (1999), on which it would be released on May 25, 1999, via Atlantic Records to contemporary hit radio, as the lead single. Despite being a songwriter, this is one of two tracks featured on Messenger not written by McCain; instead, famed American songwriter Diane Warren wrote and composed it while Matt Serletic produced it.

The track proved to be a decent commercial success, becoming a top forty hit on the Billboard Hot 100; on component charts, the single reached numbers three, six, and twenty one on the Adult Contemporary, Adult Top 40, and Mainstream Top 40 charts. In Canada, it was his biggest single, topping the country's adult contemporary chart and peaking at number 12 on the RPM 100 Hit Tracks chart.

American country music artist Sara Evans covered the song in 2000 for her third studio album Born to Fly (2000), in which her rendition would go on to become a huge country radio hit.

== Critical reception ==
Chuck Taylor of Billboard responded favorably of the track, saying the track is a case of "a song [that] just possesses a certain something that brings inspiration and a feel-good vibe, even when there aren't specific elements that can be pointed to." Taylor said the song could remove any implications that McCain was a one-hit wonder. Annette M. Lai from Gavin Report gave a positive review of the single: "McCain's voice soars with this power ballad, which will undoubtedly help land him in next week's Most Added box."

== Music video ==
The music video features McCain walking and taking a taxi through a busy city decorated like a 19th century village with people in 19th century costumes. While McCain is traveling, a number of people are sitting in a park tree. He reaches the tree just as a branch a woman is sitting on breaks and manages to catch her as she falls.

== Track listings and formats ==
European 2-track CD single

1. "I Could Not Ask for More" (Radio Mix) – 4:08
2. "I Could Not Ask for More" (Album Version) – 4:38

Australian and European 3-track CD single

1. "I Could Not Ask for More" (Radio Mix) – 4:08
2. "I Could Not Ask for More" (Album Version) – 4:38
3. "I'll Be" (Live Acoustic) – 4:25

== Charts ==
=== Weekly charts ===
Chart (1999–2000)	Peak position
Canada Top Singles (RPM)	12
Canada Adult Contemporary (RPM)	1
US Billboard Hot 100	37
US Adult Contemporary (Billboard)	3
US Adult Pop Airplay (Billboard)	6
US Pop Airplay (Billboard)	21
US Adult Contemporary (Radio & Records)	3
US CHR/Pop (Radio & Records)	17
US Hot AC (Radio & Records)	5
US Adult Contemporary (Gavin Report)	3
US Hot A/C (Gavin Report)	5
US Top 40 (Gavin Report)	19

=== Year-end charts ===
Chart (1999)	Position
Canada Top Singles (RPM)	61
Canada Adult Contemporary (RPM)	29
US Adult Contemporary (Billboard)	18
US Adult Top 40 (Billboard)	23
US Mainstream Top 40 (Billboard)	64
US Adult Contemporary (Radio & Records)	17
US CHR/Pop (Radio & Records)	56
US Hot AC (Radio & Records)	28
US A/C (Gavin Report)	20
US Hot A/C (Gavin Report)	28

Chart (2000)	Position
US Adult Contemporary (Billboard)	17
US Adult Contemporary (Radio & Records)	15

== Sara Evans version ==
"I Could Not Ask for More"

Single by Sara Evans

from the album Born to Fly
- B-side: "Born to Fly"
- Released: February 12, 2001
- Length: 4:47
- Label: RCA Nashville
- Songwriter: Diane Warren
- Producers: Sara Evans; Paul Worley

Sara Evans singles chronology
"Born to Fly" (2000)	"I Could Not Ask for More" (2001)	"Saints & Angels" (2001)

American country music artist Sara Evans recorded a cover of "I Could Not Ask for More" for her third studio album Born to Fly (2000). Serviced to country radio stations on February 12, 2001, by RCA Nashville Records, it was the second single taken off of the album. It proved to be a success, peaking at number two on the Billboard Hot Country Singles & Tracks chart, becoming her third top-10 single.

=== Music video ===
The music video for Evans' rendition was directed by Peter Zavadil, and features shots of her on location in White Sands National Monument in New Mexico singing the song in different outfits and frequently sitting in different chairs throughout the video.

=== Charts ===
"I Could Not Ask for More" debuted at number 52 on the US Billboard Hot Country Singles & Tracks chart for the week of February 17, 2001. It soon reached number two, making Born to Fly Evans' first album to spawn multiple top-10 hits on the chart.

Chart (2001)	Peak position
US Billboard Hot 100	35
US Hot Country Songs (Billboard)	2
US Country (Radio & Records)	2

==== Year-end charts ====
Chart (2001)	Position
US Hot Country Singles & Tracks (Billboard)	18
US Country (Radio & Records)	11
