= Messenger (Edwin McCain album) =

Studio album by Edwin McCain
- Released: June 15, 1999
- Studio: Tree Sound Studios, Atlanta
- Genre: Alternative rock
- Length: 56:50
- Label: Lava, Atlantic
- Producer: Matt Serletic and Noel Golden

Edwin McCain chronology
Misguided Roses (1997)	Messenger (1999)	Far from Over (2001)

Professional ratings
Review scores
Source	Rating
AllMusic	3/5 stars
Los Angeles Times	2/4 stars

Messenger is Edwin McCain's third major-label album, released on June 15, 1999. It was recorded at Tree Sound Studios & Southern Tracks in Atlanta, and Record Plant Studios in Los Angeles, and released by Lava Records.

== Track listing ==
All tracks written by Edwin McCain except "Prayer to St. Peter," based on an anonymous poem found at a WWII hospital, and "I Could Not Ask for More" written by Diane Warren.

1. "Wish in This World" - 3:43
2. "Beautiful Life" - 5:04
3. "Promise of You" - 5:31
4. "Ghosts of Jackson Square" - 4:14
5. "I Could Not Ask for More" - 4:35
6. "Do Your Thing" - 4:33
7. "Prayer to St. Peter" - 3:43
8. "Go Be Young" - 3:43
9. "Anything Good About Me" - 3:47
10. "I'll Be (Acoustic Version)" - 4:35
11. "Sign on the Door" - 5:58
12. "See Off This Mountain" - 7:00

== Personnel ==
Band

- Edwin McCain – lead vocals, guitar
- Craig Shields – saxophones, wind controller, keyboards
- Dave Harrison – drums, percussion
- Larry Chaney – electric guitar, cuatro, lap steel guitar
- Scott Bannevich – bass guitar

Additional musicians

- Matt Serletic – orchestra arrangements (track 5), horn arrangements (tracks 1, 8)
- Suzie Katayama – orchestra contractor and conductor (track 5)
- Scott Douglas – hammered dulcimer (track 12)
- William Chester – background vocals (tracks 1, 6, 11)
- Jacquelyn Reddick – background vocals (tracks 1, 6, 11)
- Yvette Preyer – background vocals (tracks 1, 6, 11)
- Jackie Johnson – background vocals (tracks 1, 6, 11)

Technical personnel

- Matt Serletic – producer (tracks 1–3, 5, 8), executive producer
- Noel Golden – producer (tracks 4, 6, 7, 9–12), engineer
- Shawn Grove – second engineer
- David Thoener – additional engineering, orchestra engineer (track 5)
- Jeff Tomei – additional engineering
- Mark Dobson – programming, digital editing
- Tal Herzberg – programming, digital editing
- Tony Adams – drum technician
- Walter Earl – drum technician
- Craig Poole – guitar technician
- Bob Clearmountain – mixing
- David Boucher – second mixing engineer
- Stephen Marcussen – mastering

== Charts ==
Album

Year	Chart	Position
1999	The Billboard 200	59

Singles

Year	Single	Chart	Position
1999	"I Could Not Ask for More"	Adult Contemporary	3
1999	"I Could Not Ask for More"	Adult Top 40	6
1999	"I Could Not Ask for More"	The Billboard Hot 100	37
1999	"I Could Not Ask for More"	Top 40 Mainstream	21
1999	"I Could Not Ask for More"	Top 40 Tracks	24
2000	"Go Be Young"	Adult Top 40	29
