= I Keep Looking =

2002 single by Sara Evans

Single by Sara Evans

from the album Born to Fly
- Released: March 18, 2002
- Recorded: 2000
- Genre: Country, country rock
- Length: 4:36
- Label: RCA Nashville
- Songwriters: Sara Evans, Tom Shapiro, Tony Martin
- Producers: Sara Evans, Paul Worley

Sara Evans singles chronology
"Saints & Angels" (2001)	"I Keep Looking" (2002)	"Backseat of a Greyhound Bus" (2003)

"I Keep Looking" is a song co-written and recorded by American country music singer Sara Evans. It was released in March 2002 as the fourth and final single from her 2000 album Born to Fly. The song was a Top 10 hit for Evans on the US Billboard Hot Country Singles & Tracks chart with a peak at number 5. It was also her fourth Top 40 hit on the Billboard Hot 100 with a peak at number 35. Even though the song lacked a music video, it was more successful than her previous single, "Saints & Angels", which only reached number 16. The song was written by Evans, Tom Shapiro and Tony Martin.

== Content ==
"I Keep Looking" is a mid-tempo song featuring electric guitar and percussion, that describes the way people are never satisfied and how they keep wanting to try new things. The song's narrator is always "looking for something more."

The beginning of the song features background noise, including Evans talking and a baby laughing.

== Chart performance ==
Chart (2002)	Peak position
US Hot Country Songs (Billboard)	5
US Billboard Hot 100	35

=== Year-end charts ===
Chart (2002)	Position
US Country Songs (Billboard)	20
