= Backseat of a Greyhound Bus =

Single by Sara Evans

from the album Restless
- Released: February 24, 2003
- Recorded: 2003
- Genre: Country
- Length: 5:33 (album version); 3:06 (radio edit)
- Label: RCA Nashville
- Songwriters: Chris Lindsey; Hillary Lindsey; Aimee Mayo; Troy Verges
- Producers: Sara Evans, Paul Worley

Sara Evans singles chronology
"I Keep Looking" (2002)	"Backseat of a Greyhound Bus" (2003)	"Perfect" (2003)

"Backseat of a Greyhound Bus" is a song written by Chris Lindsey, Hillary Lindsey, Aimee Mayo and Troy Verges and recorded by the American country music artist Sara Evans in February 2003 as the first single from her 2003 album, Restless. The song became Evans' sixth Top 20 hit on the US Billboard Hot Country Songs chart with a peak at number 16.

== Content ==
"Backseat of a Greyhound Bus" is about an unwed mother escaping her hometown in the American South in a Greyhound bus and giving birth while on the bus on Interstate 40 in Tennessee “somewhere between Jackson and Memphis".

== Critical reception ==
Deborah Evans Price of Billboard gave the song a positive review, saying that "Sara's sweet, ethereal vocals bring the story vividly to life." She also praised the song's production.

== Chart performance ==
"Backseat of a Greyhound Bus" debuted at number 56 on the U.S. Billboard Hot Country Singles & Tracks for the week of March 1, 2003.

Chart (2003)	Peak position
US Hot Country Songs (Billboard)	16
US Billboard Bubbling Under Hot 100	3

=== Year-end charts ===
Chart (2003)	Position
US Country Songs (Billboard)	52
