= Perfect (Sara Evans song) =

Single by Sara Evans

from the album Restless
- Released: September 1, 2003
- Recorded: 2003
- Genre: Country-pop
- Length: 4:01 (album version); 3:40 (radio edit)
- Label: RCA Nashville
- Songwriters: Sara Evans; Tom Shapiro; Tony Martin
- Producers: Sara Evans; Paul Worley

Sara Evans singles chronology
"Backseat of a Greyhound Bus" (2003)	"Perfect" (2003)	"Suds in the Bucket" (2004)

Music video
- "Perfect" at CMT.com

"Perfect" is a song by American country music artist Sara Evans. The track was written by Evans, Tom Shapiro, and Tony Martin, with production provided by Evans and Paul Worley. It was released on September 1, 2003, via RCA Nashville Records as the second single from her fourth studio album Restless (2003). It peaked at number two on the US Hot Country Songs chart, becoming her fifth top-ten single.

== Content ==
"Perfect" is performed in the key of E major, with Evans's vocals ranging from G#3–B4. Lyrically, the track speaks on how love doesn't need to be perfect in order to be great.

== Music video ==
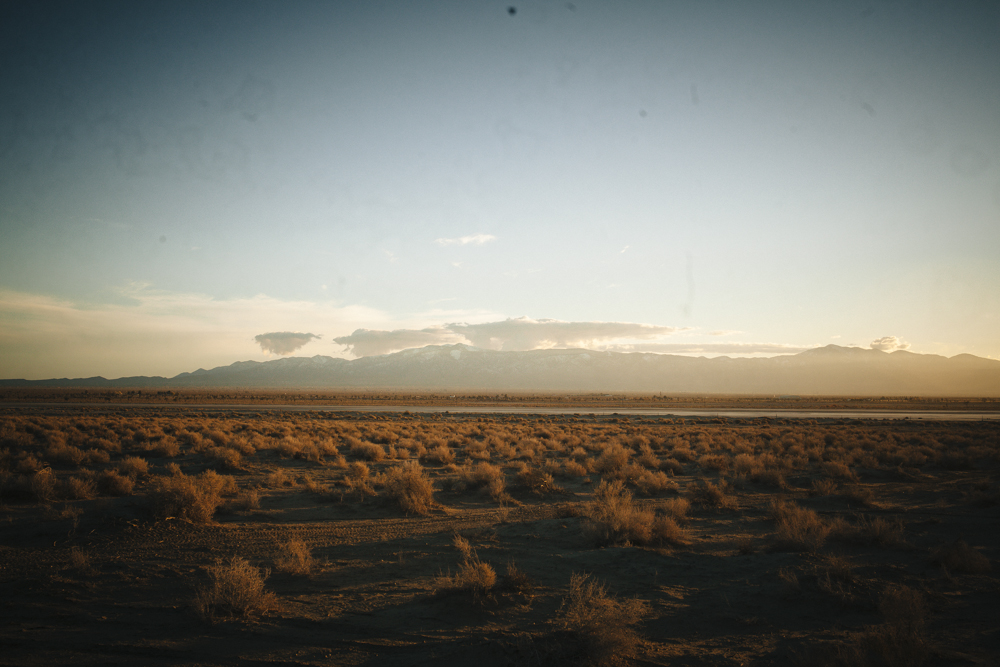
The video for "Perfect" was shot in the El Mirage Dry Lake (pictured here) in California.

The music video for the song, directed by Bobby G., features Evans singing the song with an old-fashioned microphone in a T-shirt and jeans, as well driving a red car through the desert. It was shot at El Mirage Dry Lake Bed in California's Mojave Desert. It was released to CMT on September 7, 2003. It reached the top spot of the network's Top Twenty Countdown for the week of January 6, 2004, and was placed in heavy rotation.

== Chart performance ==
"Perfect" debuted at number 55 on the US Billboard Hot Country Songs chart the week of September 20, 2003, becoming the highest debut of the week. By the end of 2003, the track had reached number 24. It would enter the top-ten of the chart the week of February 21, 2004, at number ten. That week also featured Terri Clark's "I Wanna Do It All" (no. 4) and Martina McBride's "In My Daughter's Eyes" (no. 7), making it the first time since November 3, 2001 that three solo female artists were simultaneously in the top ten; that week featured singles by McBride, Carolyn Dawn Johnson, and Reba McEntire in the top-ten. "Perfect" would reach a peak position of number two on the chart on April 3, 2004, making it the highest-charting single by a solo female artist since Terri Clark's "I Just Wanna Be Mad" also stopped at the runner up spot on February 22, 2003. It spent 33 weeks in total on the chart, Evans's fourth longest run. In February 2004, the song would receive a Spin Award from Broadcast Data Systems for 50,000 confirmed plays. It would receive another Spin Award in May 2004, this time for 100,000 confirmed plays.

== Charts ==
=== Weekly charts ===
Chart (2003–2004)	Peak position
Canada Country Top 30 (Radio & Records)	16
US Hot Country Songs (Billboard)	2
US Billboard Hot 100	46
US Country Top 50 (Radio & Records)	5

=== Year-end charts ===
Chart (2004)	Position
US Country Songs (Billboard)	17
US Country (Radio & Records)	17
