= Lost in America (Edwin McCain album) =

Studio album by Edwin McCain
- Released: April 11, 2006
- Genre: Alternative rock
- Length: 39:14
- Label: Vanguard Records
- Producer: Noel Golden

Edwin McCain chronology
Scream & Whisper (2004)	Lost in America (2006)	Nobody's Fault But Mine (2008)

Professional ratings
Review scores
Source	Rating
AllMusic	3/5 stars
The Music Box	2/5 stars
PopMatters	4/10 stars
Slant Magazine	2/5 stars
USA Today	3/4 stars

Lost in America is Edwin McCain's seventh studio album, released on April 11, 2006.

== Track listing ==
1. "Gramercy Park Hotel" (Edwin McCain) – 4:14
2. "The Kiss" (McCain, Maia Sharp) – 3:53
3. "Welcome To Struggleville" (Bill Mallonee) – 4:25
4. "Truly Believe" (McCain, Sharp) – 4:11
5. "Lost In America" (McCain, Billy Chapin, Stan Lynch) – 3:17
6. "My Mystery" (McCain, Pete Riley, Kevn Kinney) – 3:54
7. "Black and Blue" (McCain, Sharp) – 3:20
8. "Bitter and Twisted" (McCain, Riley, Larry Chaney) – 3:37
9. "Losing Tonight" (Riley) – 4:55
10. "Babylon" (Mallonee) – 3:24

== Personnel ==
The Band

- Edwin McCain – vocals, acoustic guitar
- Craig Shields – Wurlitzer, piano, Hammond organ, saxophone, accordion
- Larry Chaney – acoustic guitar, electric guitar
- Pete Riley – acoustic guitar, electric guitar, background vocals
- Lee Hendricks – bass guitar
- Dave Harrison – drums, percussion, background vocals

Additional musicians

- Nick Buda – djembe and shaker (track 4)
- Craig Wright – cajón (track 4), udu (track 4), shaker (tracks 4, 5)

Technical personnel

- Noel Golden – producer, engineer, mixing
- Shawn Grove – engineer, mixing, digital editing
- Marcus Suarez – second engineer
- Dave Harrison – percussion engineer (tracks 4, 5)
- Bob Ludwig – mastering
