= Saints & Angels =

2001 single by Sara Evans

Single by Sara Evans

from the album Born to Fly
- B-side: "I Learned That from You"
- Released: August 27, 2001
- Recorded: 2000
- Genre: Country pop
- Length: 4:24
- Label: RCA Nashville
- Songwriter: Victoria Banks
- Producers: Sara Evans; Paul Worley

Sara Evans singles chronology
"I Could Not Ask for More" (2001)	"Saints & Angels" (2001)	"I Keep Looking" (2002)

Music video
- "Saints & Angels" at CMT.com

"Saints & Angels" is a song written by Victoria Banks and recorded by American country music artist Sara Evans. It was released on August 27, 2001 as the third single from her third studio album Born to Fly (2000). The song peaked at number 16 on the US Billboard Hot Country Songs chart. Evans has stated that this was her favorite song from her Born to Fly album.

== Content ==
"Saints & Angels" is a mid-tempo piano ballad that describes a couple who is troubled by their love and pressured by their imperfections. However, in the end, they overcome their differences and essentially become "saints & angels."

== Music video ==
The accompanying music video for the song features Evans on a sidewalk with many people passing in front of her. These scenes are intercut with scenes of couples fighting and making up. Evans is also shown wearing a green T-shirt with a cross and in a blue sweater.

== Charts ==
"Saints & Angels" debuted at number 48 on the U.S. Billboard Hot Country Singles & Tracks for the week of September 15, 2001

Chart (2001–2002)	Peak position
US Hot Country Songs (Billboard)	16
US Billboard Bubbling Under Hot 100	3

== Release history ==
Release dates and format(s) for "Saints & Angels"
Region	Date	Format(s)	Label(s)	Ref.
United States	August 27, 2001	Country radio	RCA Nashville	
