= Honor Among Thieves (Edwin McCain album) =

Studio album by Edwin McCain
- Released: August 15, 1995
- Recorded: 1994
- Genre: Alternative rock
- Length: 53:33
- Label: Lava, Atlantic
- Producer: Paul Fox

Edwin McCain chronology
Honor Among Thieves (1995)	Misguided Roses (1997)

Professional ratings
Review scores
Source	Rating
Allmusic	3/5 stars
Entertainment Weekly	B+

Honor Among Thieves is Edwin McCain's first major-label album, released on CD and cassette tape on August 15, 1995 by Lava Records.

Songs from Thieves also appear on McCain's live concert DVD, Tinsel & Tap Shoes.

== Track listing ==
All songs written by Edwin McCain.

1. "Alive" - 4:03
2. "Solitude" - 4:32
3. "Jesters, Dreamers & Thieves" - 4:23
4. "Guinevere" - 3:31
5. "Sorry to a Friend" - 3:56
6. "America Street" - 4:41
7. "Russian Roulette" - 4:59
8. "Bitter Chill" - 4:23
9. "Don't Bring Me Down" - 4:00
10. "Kitchen Song" - 4:22
11. "Thirty Pieces" - 4:32
12. "3 AM" - 4:24

== Personnel ==
Band

- Edwin McCain – lead vocals, guitar, Hammond B-3, background vocals
- Craig Shields – tenor saxophone, baritone saxophone, soprano saxophone, wind controller, keyboards
- T.J. Hall – drums, percussion
- Scott Bannevich – bass guitar

Additional musicians

- Darius Rucker – vocals (track 2)
- Mark Bryan – electric guitar (track 2)
- Rami Jaffee – Hammond B-3
- Paul Fox – Hammond B-3, piano
- Lili Haydn – violin
- Gerri Sutyak – cello
- Rose Stone – background vocals
- Alice Saunderson-Echols – background vocals
- Kevin Smith – live percussion
- Greg Adams – trumpet, flugelhorn, horn arrangements
- Chuck Findley – trumpet, flugelhorn
- Nick Lane – trombone

Technical personnel

- Paul Fox – producer
- Ed Thacker – engineer, mixing
- Jim Labinski – assistant engineer
- Al Lay – assistant engineer
- Paul Mitchell – drum technician
- Suzanne Rowen – production coordinator
- Stephen Marcussen – mastering

== Charts ==
Album

Year	Chart	Position
1995	Heatseekers	1
1995	The Billboard 200	107

Singles

Year	Single	Chart	Position
1995	"Solitude"	Mainstream Rock Tracks	25
1995	"Solitude"	The Billboard Hot 100	72
1995	"Solitude"	Top 40 Mainstream	29
1995	"Solitude"	Adult Top 40	37
