= Misguided Roses =

Studio album by Edwin McCain
- Released: June 24, 1997
- Recorded: Late 1996 and early 1997
- Studio: House of Therm Studios; Love Grotto (Nashville, TN); Doppler Studios (Atlanta, GA)
- Genre: Alternative rock
- Length: 62:48
- Label: Lava, Atlantic
- Producer: Matt Rollings; Kenny Greenberg; Matt Serletic

Edwin McCain chronology
Honor Among Thieves (1995)	Misguided Roses (1997)	Messenger (1999)

Singles from Misguided Roses
- 1. "See the Sky Again" Released: April 1997; 2. "I'll Be" Released: October 1997

Professional ratings
Review scores
Source	Rating
Allmusic	link

Misguided Roses is singer/guitarist Edwin McCain's second album released by Lava Records. It was originally issued on June 24, 1997. "I'll Be", a very successful single in 1998, came from this record. Although "I'll Be" was the only successful single from the album, the track "See the Sky Again" also received some airplay.

== Track listing ==
All tracks composed by Edwin McCain, except where noted.

1. "See the Sky Again" – 4:08
2. "Grind Me in the Gears" – 4:21
3. "Cleveland Park" – 4:27
4. "I'll Be" – 4:26
5. "How Strange It Seems" (McCain, Matt Rollings, Kenny Greenberg) – 4:12
6. "The Rhythm Of Life" (McCain, Rollings, Greenberg) – 5:28
7. "Punish Me" – 5:06
8. "Darwin's Children" (McCain, Scott Bannevich) – 4:14
9. "Take Me" – 4:14
10. "(I've Got To) Stop Thinking 'Bout That" (Danny Kortchmar, James Taylor) – 3:50
11. "What Matters" (McCain, Bannevich) – 5:16
12. "Holy City" (McCain, Rollings) – 11:54

Hidden Track: The song "Through The Floor" follows the song "Holy City"

== Personnel ==
Band

- Edwin McCain – lead vocals, guitar
- Craig Shields – soprano saxophone, alto saxophone, tenor saxophone, baritone saxophone, wind controller, keyboards
- Dave Harrison – drums, percussion
- Larry Chaney – electric guitar, cuatro, lap steel guitar
- Scott Bannevich – bass guitar

Additional musicians

- Kenny Greenberg – electric guitar (all tracks except 4), additional acoustic guitar (track 3), dobro (track 7), 12-string guitar (track 11), electric baritone guitar ("Through the Floor")
- Matt Rollings – organ (all tracks except 2, 4, & "Through the Floor"), piano (tracks 5 & 11), Wurlitzer (tracks 5, 8, & 10), synthesizer (tracks 7, 9, & "Through the Floor"), anvil (track 10)
- Eric Darken – percussion (tracks 3, 5, 7-12, "Through the Floor") pandeiro (track 6)
- Vicki Hampton – background vocals (tracks 5 & 12)
- Michael McDonald – background vocals (tracks 5 & 12)
- Russ Taff – background vocals (tracks 5, 10, & 12)
- Ashley Cleveland – background vocals (track 12)
- Beth Nielsen Chapman – background vocals ("Through the Floor")

Technical personnel

- Matt Rollings – producer (all tracks except 2 & 4)
- Kenny Greenberg – producer (all tracks except 2 & 4)
- Matt Serletic – producer (tracks 2 & 4), mixing (track 4)
- Carl Meadows – engineer (all tracks except 2 & 4)
- Jeff Tomei – engineer (track 2)
- Greg Archilla – engineer and mixing (track 4)
- Richard Dodd – mixing (all tracks except 2 & 4)
- Bob Clearmountain – mixing (track 2)
- Joseph M. Palmaccio – mastering (all tracks except 2 & 4)
- Bob Ludwig – mastering (track 2)
- Stephen Marcussen – mastering (track 4)

Art and design

- Hans Neleman – cover design, Edwin McCain images
- Clay McBride – band photography, additional still-life photography
- Larry Freemantle – art direction

== Charts ==
=== Weekly charts ===
Chart (1998)	Peak position
US Billboard 200	73
US Heatseekers Albums (Billboard)	2

=== Year-end charts ===
Chart (1998)	Position
US Top Billboard 200 Albums	174

=== Singles ===
Year	Single	Chart	Position
1998	"I'll Be"	US Billboard Hot 100	5
1998	"I'll Be"	US Adult Contemporary (Billboard)	6
1998	"I'll Be"	US Adult Pop Airplay (Billboard)	6
1998	"I'll Be"	US Pop Airplay (Billboard)	10
1998	"I'll Be"	US Top 40 Tracks (Billboard)	5
