= Suds in the Bucket =

Single by Sara Evans

from the album Restless
- Released: May 5, 2004
- Recorded: 2003
- Genre: Country
- Length: 3:49
- Label: RCA Nashville
- Songwriters: Billy Montana; Tammy "Jenai" Wagoner
- Producers: Sara Evans; Paul Worley

Sara Evans singles chronology
"Perfect" (2003)	"Suds in the Bucket" (2004)	"Tonight" (2004)

Alternative cover
- Back cover

"Suds in the Bucket" is a song written by Billy Montana and Tammy Wagoner and recorded by American country music singer Sara Evans. It was released in May 2004 as the third single from Evans' 2003 album Restless. It became her third number-one single on the US Country charts, and her first since "Born to Fly" in early 2001. It was certified Platinum by the RIAA on August 18, 2023.

The song appears in the game Karaoke Revolution Country and is included in the Rock Band: Country Track Pack. It was presented as well by artist Brennley Brown on The Voice on May 15, 2017.

== Content ==
This up-tempo song tells the story of a girl who abruptly runs off to Las Vegas one day with her boyfriend, leaving the "suds in the bucket and the clothes hangin' out on the line," noting how quickly it happened. The gossip and drama then spreads to other parts of their hometown, like a hair salon and the local church.

== Critical reception ==
Deborah Evans Price, of Billboard magazine reviewed the song favorably, saying that it is "awash in fiddle and steel guitar and has a catchy chorus." She goes on to call the lyric "cute and will remind all parents of the fleeting joys of childhood and how quickly the kids begin building their own lives."

== Music video ==
The music video follows the lyrics of the song. It shows a young girl running away from home with a boy to go get married. The song is intercut with scenes of Evans singing in front of laundry drying in the front yard of a home, in a beauty shop, and in a church. The video was directed by Peter Zavadil. It was first released to Country Music Television (CMT) on May 9, 2004, and then released on May 23, 2004, on Great American Country.

The video reached the top of CMT's Top Twenty Countdown for the week of September 9, 2004.

== Charts ==
=== Weekly charts ===
Chart (2004)	Peak position
Canada Country (Radio & Records)	3
US Hot Country Songs (Billboard)	1
US Billboard Hot 100	33
US Country Top 50 (Radio & Records)	1

=== Year-end charts ===
Chart (2004)	Position
Canada Country (Radio & Records)	3
US Country Songs (Billboard)	8
US Country (Radio & Records)	23

=== Certifications ===
Region	Certification	Certified units/sales
United States (RIAA)	Platinum	1,000,000^{‡}
^{‡} Sales+streaming figures based on certification alone.
