= Restless (Sara Evans album) =

Studio album by Sara Evans
- Released: August 19, 2003
- Recorded: 2002–2003
- Studio: The Money Pit (Nashville, Tennessee)
- Genre: Country
- Length: 56:59
- Label: RCA Nashville
- Producer: Sara Evans; Paul Worley

Sara Evans chronology
Born to Fly (2000)	Restless (2003)	Real Fine Place (2005)

Singles from Restless
- 1. "Backseat of a Greyhound Bus" Released: March 3, 2003; 2. "Perfect" Released: September 15, 2003; 3. "Suds in the Bucket" Released: May 5, 2004; 4. "Tonight" Released: December 2, 2004

Professional ratings
Review scores
Source	Rating
Allmusic	3/5 stars

Restless is the fourth studio album by American country music singer Sara Evans. It was released in August 2003 via RCA Records Nashville. It has been certified platinum by the RIAA.

The album's first single, "Backseat of a Greyhound Bus", reached number 16 on the US Billboard Hot Country Songs chart. Despite the rather low chart performance of the first single, the album debuted at number 3 on the Billboard Top Country Albums chart and at number 20 on the Billboard 200 chart after selling 44,283 copies in its first week. The album's second single, "Perfect", fared better and reached number 2. "Suds in the Bucket", the third single, became a signature song for Evans, having reached number one on the country charts, making Restless her third consecutive album to contain a number one single. The fourth single, "Tonight", charted just outside the country Top 40 at number 41.

== Track listing ==
No.	Title	Writer(s)	Length
1.	"Rockin' Horse"	Sara Evans; Matt Evans; Marcus Hummon	3:58
2.	"Backseat of a Greyhound Bus"	Chris Lindsey; Hillary Lindsey; Aimee Mayo; Troy Verges	5:33
3.	"Restless"	Jeremy Stover; Willie Mack	4:14
4.	"Niagara"	S. Evans; Holly Lamar; Verges	5:34
5.	"Perfect"	S. Evans; Tom Shapiro; Tony Martin	4:01
6.	"Need to Be Next to You"	Diane Warren	4:29
7.	"To Be Happy"	Billy Crain; Kevin Fisher	3:51
8.	"Tonight"	Troy Johnson; Bonnie Baker	5:26
9.	"Otis Redding"	Angelo Petraglia; Verges; H. Lindsey	4:38
10.	"Feel It Comin' On"	S. Evans; Marcus Hummon; Darrell Scott	3:03
11.	"I Give In"	S. Evans; Hummon	4:52
12.	"Big Cry"	Petraglia; Brett James; H. Lindsey	3:18
13.	"Suds in the Bucket"	Billy Montana; Tammy "Jenai" Wagoner	3:49
Total length:			56:59

Deluxe edition
No.	Title	Writer(s)	Length
13.	"Suds in the Bucket (Original Intro)"	Montana; Wagoner	0:53
14.	"Suds in the Bucket"	Montana; Wagoner	3:49
15.	"Tonight" (Live at West Virginia University Creative Arts Center, Morgantown, West Virginia - August 28, 2004)	Johnson; Baker	5:59
16.	"Suds in the Bucket" (Live at West Virginia University Creative Arts Center, Morgantown, West Virginia - August 28, 2004)	Montana; Wagoner	3:53

== Personnel ==
- Sara Evans – lead vocals, backing vocals
- John Hobbs – keyboards, Hammond B3 organ
- Steve Nathan – keyboards, acoustic piano
- Tim Lauer – accordion
- Marcus Hummon – acoustic guitar, baritone mandolin
- Darrell Scott – acoustic guitar, bouzouki, dobro, mandolin
- Biff Watson – acoustic guitar
- Paul Worley – acoustic guitar, electric guitars
- J.T. Corenflos – electric guitars
- Troy Lancaster – electric guitars
- Jerry McPherson – electric guitars
- Bryan Sutton – banjo, mandolin
- Gary Morse – dobro, steel guitar
- Michael Rhodes – bass
- Glenn Worf – bass
- Matt Chamberlain – drums
- David Huff – drum programming, percussion, shakers
- Eric Darken – drum programming, percussion
- Glen Caruba – percussion
- Tom Roady – percussion
- Aubrey Haynie – fiddle
- Jim Horn – saxophones, horn arrangements
- Sam Levine – saxophones
- Barry Green – trombone
- Mike Haynes – trumpet
- John Mock – concertina, penny whistle
- Jonathan Yudkin – cello, Celtic harp
- Chris McDonald – string arrangements and conductor
- The Nashville String Machine – strings
- Bob Bailey – backing vocals
- Ashley Evans Simpson – backing vocals
- Lesley Evans Lyons – backing vocals
- Kim Fleming – backing vocals
- Vince Gill – backing vocals
- Adie Grey – backing vocals
- Vicki Hampton – backing vocals
- Wes Hightower – backing vocals
- Troy Johnson – backing vocals
- Hillary Lindsey – backing vocals
- Ashlie Tucker – backing vocals

== Production ==
- Sara Evans – producer
- Paul Worley – producer
- Clarke Schleicher – recording, mixing
- Mike Poole – additional engineer
- Erik Hellerman – additional engineer, recording assistant, digital editing
- Wade Hachler – recording assistant
- Rich Hanson – mix assistant
- John Mayfield – mastering
- Paige Connors – production coordinator
- Bobby Garbedian – art direction
- Astrid Herbold May – art direction, design
- Jeff Lipsky – photography
- Bjorn – photography
- Ruby Weiser – hair stylist
- Vanessa Scali – make-up
- Claudia Fowler – wardrobe stylist
- Modern Management – management

Studios

- Recorded at The Money Pit (Nashville, Tennessee).
- Additional recordings at Loud Recording and Paragon Studios (Nashville, Tennessee).
- Mixed at Loud Recording
- Mastered at Mayfield Mastering (Nashville, Tennessee).

== Chart performance ==
=== Weekly charts ===
Chart (2003)	Peak position
US Billboard 200	20
US Top Country Albums (Billboard)	3

=== Year-end charts ===
Chart (2003)	Position
US Top Country Albums (Billboard)	56
Chart (2004)	Position
US Top Country Albums (Billboard)	25
Chart (2005)	Position
US Top Country Albums (Billboard)	43

=== Singles ===
Year	Single	Peak chart positions		Certifications
Year	Single	US Country	US	Certifications
2003	"Backseat of a Greyhound Bus"	16	103	
2003	"Perfect"	2	46	
2004	"Suds in the Bucket"	1	33	RIAA: Platinum
2004	"Tonight"	41	—	
"—" denotes releases that did not chart

== Certifications ==
Region	Certification
United States (RIAA)	Platinum
