= Born to Fly =

Studio album by Sara Evans
- Released: October 10, 2000
- Recorded: 1999–2000
- Studio: The Money Pit and Seventeen Grand Recording (Nashville, Tennessee); The Sound Kitchen (Franklin, Tennessee)
- Genre: Country
- Length: 52:04
- Label: RCA Nashville
- Producer: Sara Evans; Paul Worley

Sara Evans chronology
No Place That Far (1998)	Born to Fly (2000)	Restless (2003)

Singles from Born to Fly
- 1. "Born to Fly" Released: June 26, 2000; 2. "I Could Not Ask for More" Released: February 12, 2001; 3. "Saints & Angels" Released: September 3, 2001; 4. "I Keep Looking" Released: March 18, 2002

Professional ratings
Review scores
Source	Rating
Allmusic	3.5/5 stars

Born to Fly is the third studio album by American country music artist Sara Evans. It was released in October 2000 via RCA Records Nashville. The album produced four singles with its title track, "I Could Not Ask for More" (a cover of an Edwin McCain song), "Saints & Angels", and "I Keep Looking", all of which reached within the Top 20 on the US Billboard Hot Country Songs chart. The title track reached number one, "I Could Not Ask for More" and "I Keep Looking" both broke the Top 5 at numbers 2 and 5 respectively, and "Saints & Angels" peaked at number 16. Born to Fly has been Evans' highest-selling album to date, having been certified 2× Platinum by the Recording Industry Association of America (RIAA) for U.S. sales of two million copies. The album was also one of the most successful of the year. Evans was nominated for five CMA Awards: Album of the Year; song, single, and music video (for the title-track); and Female Vocalist of the Year. She won her first CMA award for music video of the year. The international version of the album includes a bonus track, "You", which was later released in North America as a bonus track on her 2005 album Real Fine Place. Born to Fly was a defining album for Evans. Her earlier albums had more of a neotraditional country sound, while all of her later albums had a more crossover-friendly country pop sound, similar to Martina McBride and Faith Hill.

== Track listing ==
No.	Title	Writer(s)	Length
1.	"Born to Fly"	Sara Evans; Marcus Hummon; Darrell Scott	5:36
2.	"Saints & Angels"	Victoria Banks	4:24
3.	"I Could Not Ask for More"	Diane Warren	4:47
4.	"I Keep Looking"	Evans; Tom Shapiro; Tony Martin	4:36
5.	"I Learned That from You"	Tony Lane; Jess Brown	5:09
6.	"Let's Dance"	Evans; Randy Scruggs	4:05
7.	"Why Should I Care"	Evans; Shapiro; Martin	3:46
8.	"Four-Thirty"	Hillary Lindsey; Bill Lloyd	4:32
9.	"Show Me the Way to Your Heart"	Evans; James LeBlanc	3:54
10.	"You Don't"	Evans; Aimee Mayo; Ron Harbin	5:11
11.	"Every Little Kiss"	Bruce Hornsby	6:04
12.	"You" (International bonus track)	Brett James; Troy Verges	3:34
Total length:			52:04

== Personnel ==
Compiled from liner notes.

- Sara Evans – lead vocals, backing vocals
- Steve Nathan – acoustic piano, Rhodes piano, Hammond B3 organ, synthesizers
- Matt Rollings – Hammond B3 organ
- Tim Lauer – accordion
- Bruce Hornsby – acoustic piano, Wurlitzer organ
- Dan Dugmore – acoustic guitar, steel guitar
- Marcus Hummon – acoustic guitar
- B. James Lowry – acoustic guitar
- Randy Scruggs – acoustic guitar, banjo
- Biff Watson – acoustic guitar, bouzouki, mandolin
- Paul Worley – acoustic guitar, 12-string acoustic guitar, electric guitars, electric rhythm guitar, six-string bass
- Jerry McPherson – electric guitars, electric rhythm guitar
- Jerry Douglas – dobro
- Robby Turner – steel guitar
- Aubrey Haynie – fiddle
- Jonathan Yudkin – fiddle, mandolin
- Glenn Worf – bass
- Matt Chamberlain – drums
- Karen Winkelman – string arrangements and orchestrations
- The Nashville String Machine – strings
- Wes Hightower – backing vocals
- Troy Johnson – backing vocals
- Lesley Evans Lyons – backing vocals
- Melody Schelske – backing vocals
- Ashley Evans Simpson – backing vocals
- Ricky Skaggs – backing vocals

== Production ==
- Sara Evans – producer
- Paul Worley – producer
- Clarke Schleicher – recording, mixing, additional recording
- Todd Gunnerson – additional recording, recording assistant
- Erik Hellerman – additional recording, recording assistant, mix assistant
- Mike Poole – additional recording
- Sandy Williams – additional recording, recording assistant
- Wade Hachler – recording assistant
- Rich Hanson – mix assistant
- Eric Conn – digital editing
- Carlos Grier – digital editing
- Denny Purcell – mastering
- Paige Connors – production coordinator
- S. Wade Hunt – art direction
- Missy McKeand – design
- Andrew Eccles – photography
- Joel Green – hair stylist
- Mary Beth Felts – make-up
- Claudia Fowler – wardrobe stylist
- Brenner Van Meter – management
- Mixed at Loud Recording (Nashville, Tennessee).
- Mastered at Georgetown Masters (Nashville, Tennessee).

== Charts ==
=== Weekly charts ===
Chart (2000–2001)	Peak position
Canadian Country Albums (RPM)	12
US Billboard 200	55
US Top Country Albums (Billboard)	6

=== Year-end charts ===
Chart (2001)	Position
Canadian Country Albums (Nielsen SoundScan)	25
US Billboard 200	107
US Top Country Albums (Billboard)	9
Chart (2002)	Position
Canadian Country Albums (Nielsen SoundScan)	84
US Top Country Albums (Billboard)	25

=== Singles ===
Year	Single	Peak chart positions	
Year	Single	US Country	US
2000	"Born to Fly"	1	34
2001	"I Could Not Ask for More"	2	35
2001	"Saints & Angels"	16	103
2002	"I Keep Looking"	5	35

== Certifications ==
Region	Certification	Certified units/sales
Canada (Music Canada)	Gold	50,000^{^}
United States (RIAA)	2× Platinum	2,000,000^{^}
^{^} Shipments figures based on certification alone.
