= Scream & Whisper =

Studio album by Edwin McCain
- Released: June 22, 2004
- Genre: Alternative rock
- Length: 56:22
- Language: English
- Label: DRT
- Producer: Noel Golden

Edwin McCain chronology
The Austin Sessions (2003)	Scream & Whisper (2004)	Lost in America (2006)

Professional ratings
Review scores
Source	Rating
AllMusic	2/5 stars
Paste	(unfavorable)
Rolling Stone	2/5 stars
USA Today	2.5/4 stars

Scream & Whisper is Edwin McCain's sixth studio album, released on June 22, 2004 by DRT Entertainment, McCain's second label in as many years. The album was his first new release in three years, and was recorded at Sonica Studios, Atlanta, Georgia, and Dirtmachine Studios in Studio City, California.

== Track listing ==
1. "Coming Down" (McCain, Pete Riley) – 3:33
2. "Shooting Stars" (Angie Aparo, McCain, Riley) – 3:37
3. "Throw It All Away" (Malcolm Pardon, Riley, Fredrik Rinman) – 4:01
4. "Say Anything" (McCain, Riley, Maia Sharp) – 3:43
5. "Turning Around" (McCain) – 3:40
6. "Couldn't Love You More" (Larry Chaney, McCain) – 4:18
7. "Good Enough" (Tyrone Coleman, McCain) – 4:04
8. "Farewell to Tinkerbell" (McCain) – 2:59
9. "How Can You Say That to Me" (McCain, Riley) – 4:08
10. "Day Will Never Come" (Riley) – 4:27
11. "Save the Rain" (Paul O'Brien, Riley) – 3:38
12. "White Crosses" (McCain) – 6:11
13. "Wild at Heart" (McCain) – 2:58
14. "Maggie May" (Bonus Track) (Martin Quittenton, Rod Stewart) – 5:05

== Personnel ==
Musicians

- Edwin McCain – guitar (acoustic), mandolin, vocals
- Larry Chaney – guitar (acoustic), mandolin, guitar (electric)
- Pete Riley – guitar (acoustic), mandolin, guitar (electric), vocals (background)
- Craig Shields – clarinet (bass), keyboards, organ (hammond), saxophone, wind controller
- Lee Hendricks – guitar (bass)
- Dave Harrison – percussion, drums
- Noel Golden – keyboards, producer, engineer, mixing
- John Lancaster – piano, wurlitzer
- Maia Sharp – vocals

Production

- Mike Froedge – drum technician
- George Marino – mastering
- John Briglevich – engineer
- Phillip Ducker – engineer
- Branon Thames – assistant engineer
- Christopher Wade Damerst – programming
- Mark Dobson – programming

Additional

- Bryce Alexender – photography
- Angie Little – photography
- Rodney Bursiel – cover photo
- Shawn Grove – digital editing
- Scott Johnson – art direction
- Colin Miller – assistant

== Charts ==
Chart (2004)	Peak position
US Billboard 200	183
US Top Independent Albums	13
US Top Internet Albums	183
