= Far from Over (Edwin McCain album) =

Far From Over

Studio album by Edwin McCain
- Released: June 19, 2001
- Genre: Alternative rock
- Length: 55:22
- Label: Lava, Atlantic
- Producer: Greg Archilla; Edwin McCain (add.); Scott Bannevich (add.); Larry Chaney (add.); Dave Harrison (add.); Craig Shields (add.)

Edwin McCain chronology
Messenger (1999)	Far From Over (2001)	The Austin Sessions (2003)

Professional ratings
Review scores
Source	Rating
Allmusic	3/5 stars

Far From Over, Edwin McCain's fourth album, was the last album of his to be released by Lava Records, about six months before he was dropped from their roster. It was issued on June 19, 2001. It was recorded at Pedernales Studios in Austin, Texas.

== Track listing ==
All tracks composed by McCain except "I've Seen a Love" composed by McCain and Duane Evans.

1. "Far From Over" - 4:15
2. "Hearts Fall" - 4:31
3. "Sun Will Rise" - 4:14
4. "I've Seen a Love" - 4:40
5. "Write Me a Song" - 4:42
6. "Letter To My Mother" - 3:31
7. "Get Out of This Town" - 3:36
8. "Kentucky" - 2:55
9. "Radio Star" - 2:59
10. "Dragons" - 3:59
11. "One Thing Left To Do" - 6:26
12. "Jesus, He Loves Me" - 5:28

== Personnel ==
Band

- Edwin McCain – lead vocals, acoustic guitar, electric guitar, additional production
- Craig Shields – saxophones, wind controller, keyboards, additional production
- Dave Harrison – drums, percussion, loop programming, additional production
- Larry Chaney – lead electric guitar, acoustic guitar, lap steel guitar, mandolin, additional production
- Scott Bannevich – bass guitar, additional production

Additional musicians

- Shawn Colvin – background vocals (tracks 2, 5)
- Jacquelyne M. Reddick – background vocals (tracks 4, 12)
- Jacqueline Johnson – background vocals (tracks 4, 7, 12)
- Derrick Jackson – keyboards (tracks 4, 12)
- Richard Furch – piano (track 5)
- David Campbell – string arrangements (tracks 2, 5, 6)
- Joel Derouin – violin (tracks 2, 5, 6)
- Charlie Bisharat – violin (tracks 2, 5, 6)
- Mario DeLeon – violin (tracks 2, 5, 6)
- Derj Garabedian – violin (tracks 2, 5, 6)
- Peter Kent – violin (tracks 2, 5, 6)
- Brian Leonard – violin (tracks 2, 5, 6)
- Bob Becker – viola (tracks 2, 5, 6)
- Matt Funes – viola (tracks 2, 5, 6)
- Larry Corbett – cello (tracks 2, 5, 6)
- Suzie Katayama – cello (tracks 2, 5, 6)

Technical personnel

- Greg Archilla – producer, engineer, digital editing, mixing
- Steve Chadie – assistant engineer
- Todd Dillon – assistant engineer
- Phillip Ducker – additional studio assistance
- Gene Bishop – additional studio assistance
- Neil Griggs – assistant engineer
- David "Dibs" Shackney – additional digital editing
- Richard Furch – assistant mix engineer
- Karl Egsieker – assistant mix engineer
- Ryan Williams – assistant mix engineer
- Kevin Paige – assistant mix engineer
- Vladimir Meller – mastering
- Alan Messer – design, photography

== Charts ==
Chart (2001)	Peak position
US Billboard 200	105

Singles

Year	Single	Chart	Position
2001	"Hearts Fall"	US Adult Contemporary (Billboard)	27
