= Edwin McCain =

American singer-songwriter and guitarist from South Carolina

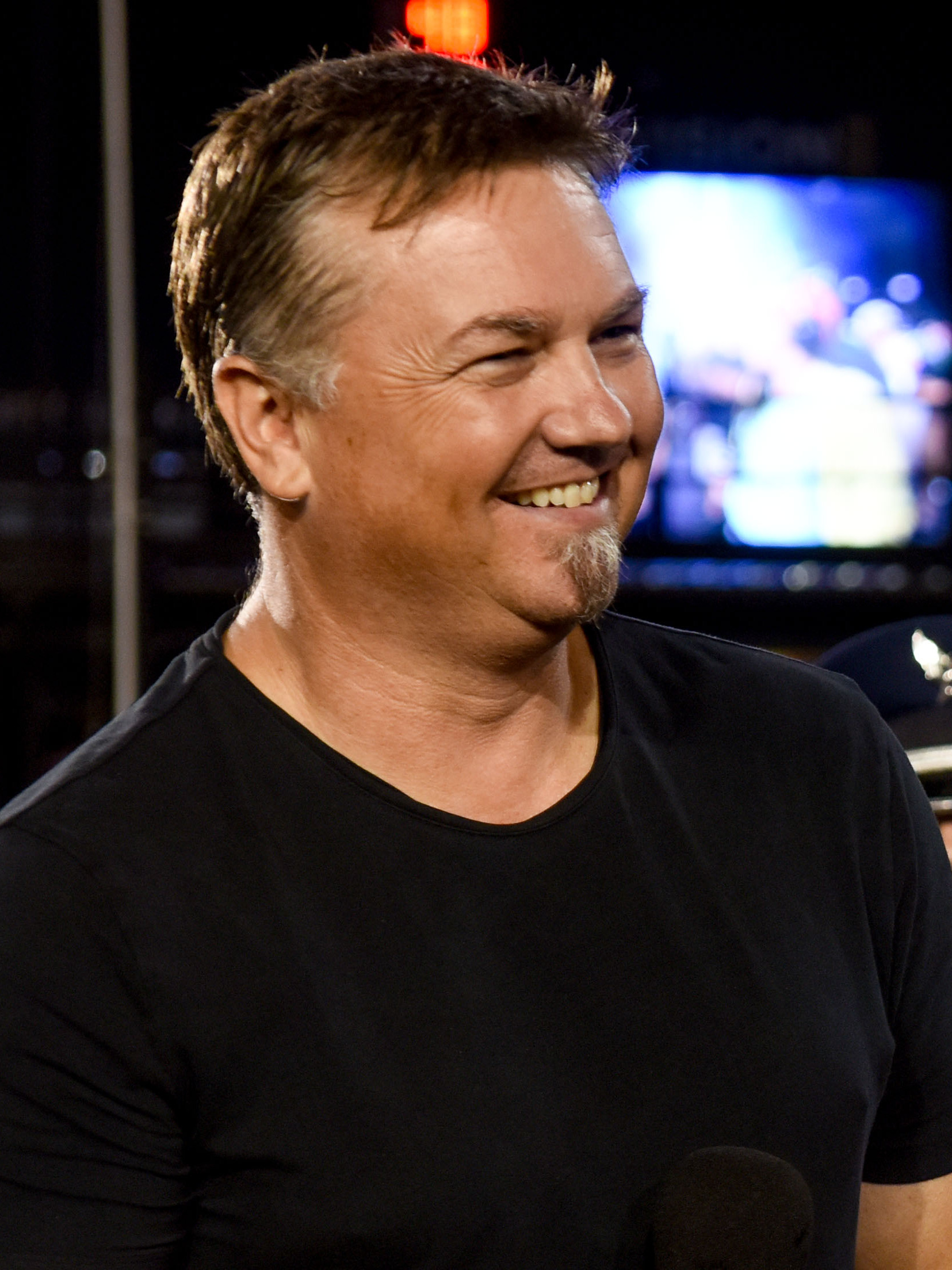
- McCain at Darlington Raceway in 2019

Background information
- Born: Edwin Cole McCain; January 20, 1970 (age 56)
- Genres: Alternative rock; pop rock; indie rock
- Instruments: Vocals, guitar
- Years active: 1991–present
- Labels: Saguaro Road; DRT; 429; Vanguard; Atlantic; Lava
- Member of: The Edwin McCain band
- Website: www.edwin.com

Edwin Cole McCain (born January 20, 1970) is an American singer-songwriter and guitarist. He is best known for his 1998 single "I'll Be", which peaked at number 5 in the Billboard Hot 100; its 1999 follow-up, "I Could Not Ask for More", peaked within its top 40. 5 of McCain's 11 albums have entered the Billboard 200.

== Early life ==
McCain graduated from Christ Church Episcopal School in Greenville, South Carolina, and briefly attended both the College of Charleston and Coastal Carolina University.

== Career ==
In 1994, McCain recorded his first major-label album, Honor Among Thieves under the Lava Records imprint. The record was released in 1995. His second album, Misguided Roses, spawned "I'll Be", a major hit single in 1998. "I'll Be" also is featured on the charitable album, Live in the X Lounge, along with a live version of McCain's "Solitude".

The summer of 1999 marked the arrival of McCain's third album, Messenger, which included a second Top 40 hit, the Diane Warren-penned "I Could Not Ask For More." "I Could Not Ask For More" was also featured on the soundtrack for the 1999 film Message in a Bottle.

In 2002, McCain released his first DVD, Mile Marker: Songs and Stories from the Acoustic Highway. In 2003, he released a collection of acoustic versions of old and new songs called The Austin Sessions. About the same time, he hosted "Inside Music With Edwin McCain", a syndicated show on the Sirius radio network. Mid-2004 saw the arrival of McCain's studio album Scream & Whisper. In late 2004, McCain released his second DVD, Tinsel and Tap Shoes. It was his first live concert DVD, recorded at The House of Blues in Myrtle Beach, South Carolina.

In 2005, McCain released a single, "Hold Out a Hand," co-written and performed with singer/songwriter Maia Sharp. All profits from the single went to hurricane relief. McCain's next album, Lost in America, was released on April 11, 2006. Lost in America contained three singles: "Truly Believe", "The Kiss" and live-favorite "Gramercy Park Hotel", which pays homage to the New York City landmark and its colorful patrons. A subsequent recording, a collection of R&B cover songs titled "Nobody's Fault But Mine", was produced by Tor Hyams and released through Saguaro Road Records on June 24, 2008; it included a version of Soul Brothers Six song "Some Kind of Wonderful." In 2010, McCain released The Best of Edwin McCain, a 20-year career retrospective that included a cross-section of material as well as a new single, "Walk With You" (produced by Don Was.) McCain's 10th album, Mercy Bound, was released August 30, 2011.

On January 22, 2017, McCain sang the American National Anthem at Gillette Stadium for the AFC Championship Game between the New England Patriots and Pittsburgh Steelers. On November 29, 2019, McCain released his first Christmas album, Merry Christmas, Baby.

In 2025, McCain competed in season thirteen of The Masked Singer as "Nessy.” He was eliminated in "Top 5: Soundtrack of My Life" and did an encore of "I'll Be.”

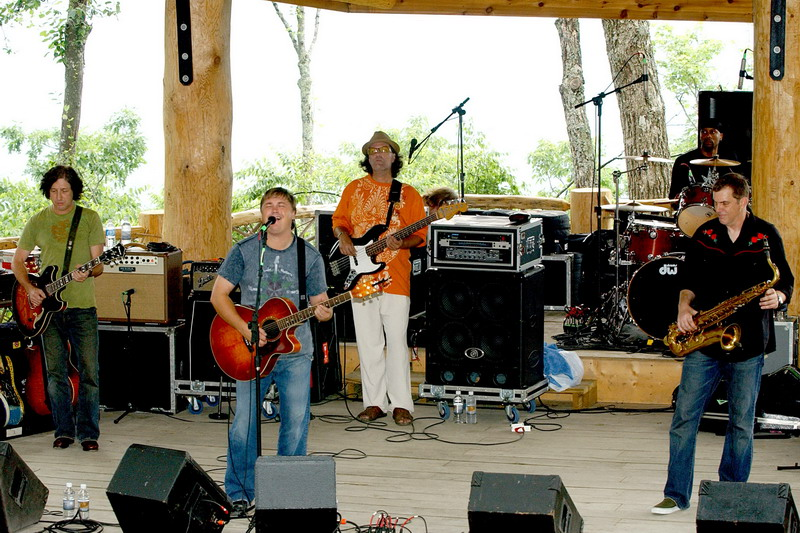
Lineup of Edwin McCain Band as of July 7, 2007. Pete Riley is not pictured.

== Discography ==
=== Independent albums ===
Title	Album details
Nomadic Logic	Released: 1991; Format: cassette
Solitude	Released: 1993; Format: CD, cassette

=== Studio albums ===
Title	Album details	Peak chart positions	Certifications
Title	Album details	US	Certifications
Honor Among Thieves	Released: August 15, 1995; Label: Lava/Atlantic Records; Format: CD, digital download	107	
Misguided Roses	Released: June 24, 1997; Label: Lava/Atlantic Records; Format: CD, digital download	73	RIAA: Platinum
Messenger	Released: June 15, 1999; Label: Lava/Atlantic Records; Format: CD, digital download	59	RIAA: Gold
Far from Over	Released: June 19, 2001; Label: Lava/Atlantic Records; Format: CD, digital download	105	
The Austin Sessions	Released: February 25, 2003; Label: ATC Records; Format: CD, digital download	—	
Scream & Whisper	Released: June 22, 2004; Label: DRT Entertainment; Format: CD, digital download	183	
Rhino Hi-five: Edwin McCain	Released: September 20, 2005; Label: Rhino; Format: CD, digital download	—	
Lost in America	Released: April 11, 2006; Label: Vanguard Records; Format: CD, digital download	—	
Nobody's Fault But Mine	Released: June 24, 2008; Label: Saguaro Road Records; Format: CD, digital download	—	
Mercy Bound	Released: August 30, 2011; Label: 429 Records; Format: CD, digital download	—	
Merry Christmas, Baby	Released: November 29, 2019; Label: Saguaro Road Records; Format: CD, digital download	—	
Lucky	Released: February 21, 2025; Label: BFD Records; Format: CD, digital download	—	

=== EPs ===
Title	Album details
Tinsel & Tap Shoes - Live at the House of Blues	Released: November 16, 2004; Label: Independent; Format: CD, digital download
Phoenix	Released: May 8, 2015; Label: Working Nomad Records; Format: CD, digital download
O Edwin, Where Art Thou?	Released: August 12, 2016; Label: Independent; Format: CD, digital download

=== Compilations ===
Title	Album details
The Best of Edwin McCain	Released: March 30, 2010; Label: Saguaro Road Records; Format: CD, digital download
Live Versions	Released: July 18, 2013; Label: Working Nomad Records; Format: CD, digital download

=== Soundtrack appearances ===
Title	Album details
Twister	Released: March 30, 2010; Label: Saguaro Road Records; Format: CD, digital download
The Family Man	Released: July 18, 2013; Label: Working Nomad Records; Format: CD, digital download

=== Singles ===
Year	Single	Peak chart positions					Certifications	Album
Year	Single	US	US AC	US Main.	CAN	PHL	Certifications	Album
1995	"Solitude"	72	—	25	45	—		Honor Among Thieves
1995	"Sorry to a Friend"	—	—	—	—	—		Honor Among Thieves
1997	"See the Sky Again"	—	—	—	—	—		Misguided Roses
1998	"I'll Be"	5	6	—	52	31	RMNZ: Platinum	Misguided Roses
1998	"What Matters"	—	—	—	—	—		Misguided Roses
1999	"I Could Not Ask for More"	37	3	—	12	—		Messenger
1999	"Go Be Young"	—	—	—	—	—		Messenger
2000	"Beautiful Life"	—	—	—	—	—		Messenger
2001	"Hearts Fall"	—	27	—	—	—		Far from Over
2001	"Far from Over"	—	—	—	—	—		Far from Over
2001	"Radio Star"	—	—	—	—	—		Far from Over
2001	"Write Me a Song"	—	—	—	—	—		Far from Over
2004	"Say Anything"	—	—	—	—	—		Scream and Whisper
2004	"Shooting Stars"	—	—	—	—	—		Scream and Whisper
2006	"Gramercy Park Hotel"	—	—	—	—	—		Lost in America
2006	"Truly Believe"	—	—	—	—	—		Lost in America
2007	"The Kiss"	—	—	—	—	—		Lost in America
2008	"Some Kind of Wonderful"	—	—	—	—	—		Nobody's Fault But Mine
2010	"Walk With You"	—	—	—	—	—		The Best of Edwin McCain
2016	"Christmas Chihuahua"	—	—	—	—	—		O Edwin, Where Art Thou?
– denotes releases that did not chart

=== Soundtrack appearances ===
Year	Single	Album			
Year	Single	Album	1996	"See the Sky Again"	Twister
2000	"I Don't Know How I Got By"	The Family Man			

== Filmography ==
Year	Title	Role	Notes
2025	The Masked Singer	Himself/Nessy	Season 13 contestant
