= The Austin Sessions (Edwin McCain album) =

Studio album by Edwin McCain
- Released: February 23, 2003
- Genre: Alternative rock
- Length: 56:24
- Label: ATC Records
- Producer: Greg Archilla et al.

Edwin McCain chronology
Far From Over (2001)	The Austin Sessions (2003)	Scream & Whisper (2004)

Professional ratings
Review scores
Source	Rating
Allmusic	3/5 stars
The Music Box	3.5/5 stars

Edwin McCain's The Austin Sessions was his fifth album overall, but the first released after his split with longtime label Lava Records. ATC Records issued this album, which was recorded at Arlin Studios in Austin, Texas and Seventeen Grand Studios in Nashville, Tennessee. Sessions is completely acoustic, with a mix of new material, "fan favorites", and selected covers that he often plays at live shows.

== Track listing ==
1. "Let It Slide" (Larry Chaney, Phillip Lamonds, McCain, Pete Riley) - 3:21
2. "Go Be Young" (McCain) - 5:17
3. "I Want It All" (McCain, Wendell Mobley, Neil Thrasher) - 4:08
4. "Little Girls" (Chaney, Lamonds, McCain, Riley) - 3:51
5. "Sorry to a Friend" (McCain) - 5:49
6. "Popcorn Box" (Jeff Armstrong, Eric Hamilton) - 5:40
7. "No Choice" (Buddy Mondlock) - 3:53
8. "Ghosts of Jackson Square" (McCain) - 5:05
9. "Island Song" (Bruce Crichton) - 4:06
10. "Wino's Lullabye" (McCain) - 4:10
11. "Romeo and Juliet" (Mark Knopfler) - 7:34
12. "Beautiful Day" (McCain, Riley) - 3:30

== Personnel ==
- Edwin McCain - guitar (acoustic), vocals, producer
- Pete Riley - guitar (acoustic), vocals (background), producer
- Larry Chaney - guitar (acoustic), mandolin, guitar (electric), producer
- Dave Harrison - percussion, drums, producer
- Greg Archilla - producer, engineer, mixing
- Scott Bannevich - bass, guitar (bass), producer
- Steve Chadie - engineer
- Justin Harris - art direction, design
- Kevin Houston - mixing assistant, assistant
- Craig Shields - saxophone, producer, wind controller
- Hank Williams - mastering

== Charts ==
Chart (2003)	Peak position
US Top Independent Albums	17
US Top Internet Albums	285
