= I'll Be (Edwin McCain song) =

1998 single by Edwin McCain

Single by Edwin McCain

from the album Misguided Roses
- B-side: "Grind Me in the Gears"
- Released: October 1997
- Length: 4:27
- Label: Lava
- Songwriter: Edwin McCain
- Producer: Matt Serletic

Edwin McCain singles chronology
"See the Sky Again" (1997)	"I'll Be" (1997)	"What Matters" (1998)

Music video
- I'll Be on YouTube

"I'll Be" is a song written and performed by American singer Edwin McCain. The song was serviced to US radio in October 1997 and was commercially released on September 8, 1998, as the first single from his second album, Misguided Roses (1997). McCain recorded an acoustic version of the song for his follow-up album, Messenger. The radio version of "I'll Be", which was released on a CD single with "Grind Me in the Gears" as the B-side, differs from the album version. Its opening melody is played with electric guitar (as opposed to acoustic on the album) and the vocal and saxophone lines differ. Upon its release, the song reached number five in the United States and number 52 in Canada.

On December 22, 1999, McCain recorded a version with Warren Haynes on the live concert album from the 11th Annual Christmas Jam, a benefit concert for Habitat for Humanity in Asheville, North Carolina. The album is titled Wintertime Blues: The Benefit Concert. In 2015, McCain re-recorded "I'll Be" for his EP Phoenix.

== Content ==
Although "I'll Be" has become a popular wedding song, McCain said "it's really more of a prayer" written in a moment of personal desperation after a break-up, the idea being that "maybe if I write my future, it'll come true."

McCain said, "It was the end of a relationship for me, and it was also an admission of my inability to function in a relationship, hence the love suicide line. And it was the hope that I would be better, grow and be better as a person. I was struggling with some personal problems at the time, as well, so it was all of those things. It was this admission of failure and this prayer that I could be a better person, wrapped up as sort of the end of a relationship kind of thought. And it was something that I said to a girl that I'd been going out with. I knew that she was waiting, and I always said to her, 'Don't ever look back on this in any other way than I'll be your biggest fan.' You know, 'I'll always be a fan.'"

== Chart performance ==
In the United States, "I'll Be" debuted on the Billboard Hot 100 Airplay chart on the issue dated February 28, 1998, and went on to peak at number four there in November, in its 39th week on the chart. Under the chart rules at the time, which required songs to have a physical single release, "I'll Be" was initially ineligible for the Billboard Hot 100, but on September 8, 1998, a "very limited pressing" of the song was issued, making it then eligible; it debuted at number seven on the Hot 100 on the issue dated September 26, 1998, and ultimately peaked at number five the following week. While it was only McCain's second single to chart, it became his first and only top-10 hit and his biggest hit.

== Track listings ==
US CD single

1. "I'll Be" – 4:28
2. "Grind Me in the Gears" – 4:22
3. "I'll Be" (full-length music video)

US 7-inch single

1. "I'll Be" – 4:28
2. "Grind Me in the Gears" – 4:22

European CD single

1. "I'll Be" (edit)
2. "Solitude"
3. "I'll Be" (LP version)

Digital download

1. "I'll Be" (LP version) – 4:26
2. "I'll Be" (acoustic version) – 4:37
3. "I'll Be" (video) – 4:07

== Charts ==
=== Weekly charts ===
Chart (1998–1999)	Peak position
Canada Top Singles (RPM)	52
Canada Adult Contemporary (RPM)	6
US Billboard Hot 100	5
US Adult Alternative Airplay (Billboard)	10
US Adult Contemporary (Billboard)	6
US Adult Pop Airplay (Billboard)	6
US Pop Airplay (Billboard)	10
US Top 40 Tracks (Billboard)	5

Chart (2025)	Peak position
Philippines (Philippines Hot 100)	31

=== Year-end charts ===
Chart (1998)	Position
Canada Adult Contemporary (RPM)	61
US Billboard Hot 100	74
US Adult Contemporary (Billboard)	48
US Adult Top 40 (Billboard)	6
US Mainstream Top 40 (Billboard)	18
US Triple-A (Billboard)	28

Chart (1999)	Position
US Adult Contemporary (Billboard)	11
US Adult Top 40 (Billboard)	33

Chart (2025)	Position
Philippines (Philippines Hot 100)	98

== Certifications ==
Region	Certification	Certified units/sales
New Zealand (RMNZ)	Platinum	30,000^{‡}
^{‡} Sales+streaming figures based on certification alone.

== Release history ==
Region	Date	Format(s)	Label(s)	Ref.
United States	October 1997	Mainstream rock radio	Lava	
United States	September 8, 1998	7-inch vinyl; CD	Lava	

== Kian Egan version ==
"I'll Be"

Single by Kian Egan

from the album Home
- Released: May 12, 2014
- Length: 4:00
- Label: Rhino
- Songwriter: Edwin McCain
- Producer: Brian Rawling

Kian Egan singles chronology
"Home" (2014)	"I'll Be" (2014)

Music video
- I'll Be on YouTube

In 2014, "I'll Be" was covered by Irish musician Kian Egan. The song was included on his debut album, and was released as a single on May 12, 2014, through Rhino Records.

=== Background and production ===
In an interview with Digital Spy, Egan said "I chose 'I'll Be' for my second single, as I've always absolutely loved this song. This song means a lot to me and being able to record it was an honour. I'm incredibly excited to be able to perform this for all my fans."

=== Music video ===
The footage was shot in Egan's hometown of Sligo, in County Sligo, and the singer can be seen strumming a guitar while wandering along the deserted beach. In the visual, Egan also throws pebbles out to sea before meeting up with friends around a campfire.

=== Artwork ===
The single cover of the song shows Egan sitting on a plush red sofa and holding a white guitar.

== In popular culture ==
At the height of the song's popularity in 1998, it was featured during a pivotal moment in the first-season finale episode titled "Decisions" on the WB series Dawson's Creek. In the episode of The Office "Here Comes Treble", the song is covered by Andy Bernard's a cappella group. In the 2022 film Shotgun Wedding, the song is sung by the cast during the climax of the film.
