= Kip Moore discography =

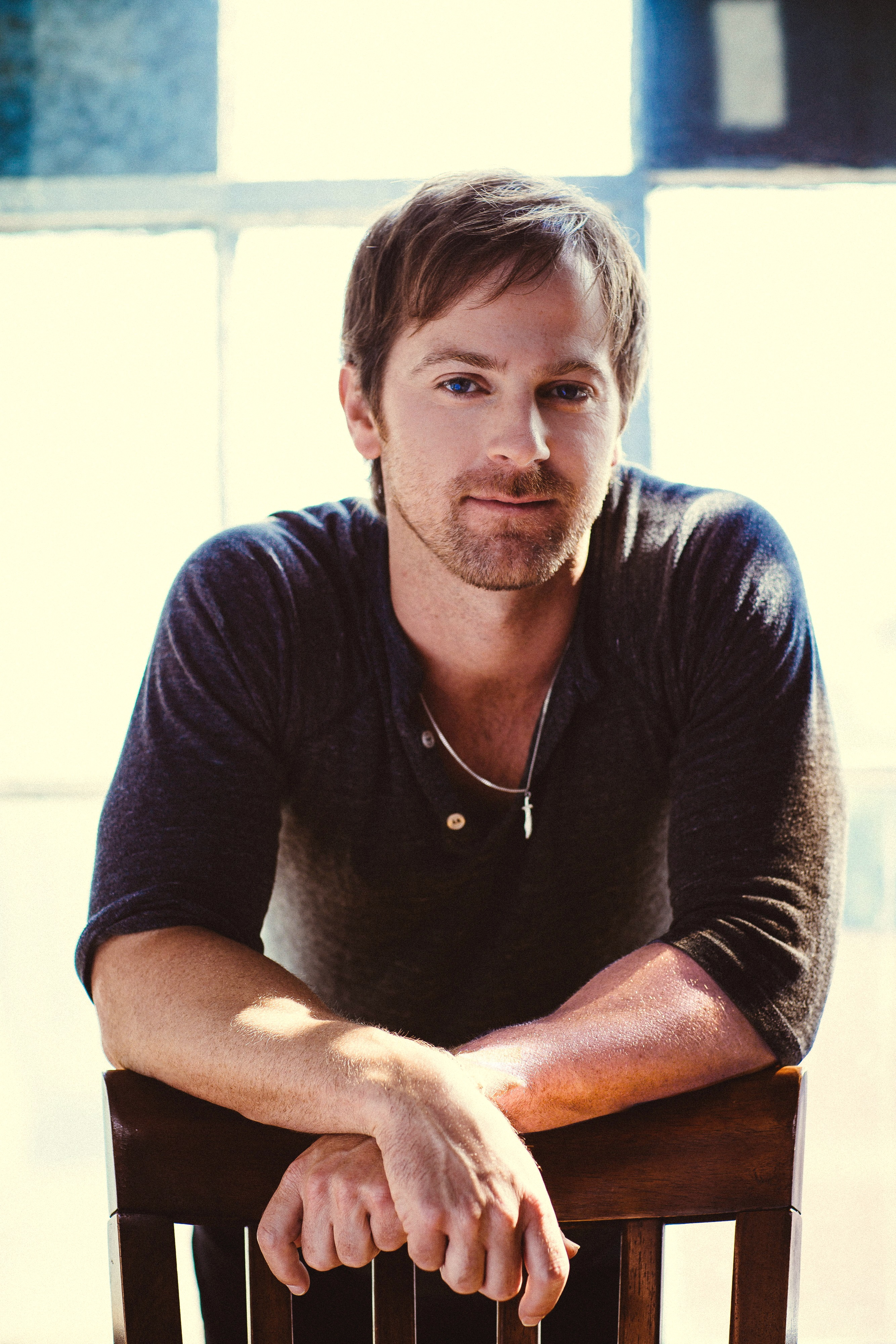
- Studio albums: 7
- EPs: 2
- Singles: 13
- Music videos: 25
- No. 1 singles: 2
- Other charted songs: 1

American country music artist Kip Moore has released seven studio albums, two extended plays, twenty-five music videos, and thirteen singles, of which one has charted at number one on Country Airplay: "Somethin' 'Bout a Truck". "Beer Money" would also chart at number one on Canada Country.

== Studio albums ==
Title	Details	Peak chart positions				Sales	Certifications
Title	Details	US	US Country	AUS	CAN	Sales	Certifications
Up All Night	Release date: April 24, 2012; Label: MCA Nashville	6	3	—	—		RIAA: Platinum
Wild Ones	Release date: August 21, 2015; Label: MCA Nashville	4	2	29	5	US: 88,600	
Slowheart	Release date: September 8, 2017; Label: MCA Nashville	10	3	6	10	US: 56,200	
Wild World	Release date: May 29, 2020; Label: MCA Nashville	36	5	4	53		
Damn Love	Release date: April 28, 2023; Label: MCA Nashville	— (Note: Damn Love did not enter the Billboard 200, but peaked at number 23 on the Top Album Sales chart.)	39	37	—		
Solitary Tracks	Release date: February 28, 2025; Label: Slowheart	—	—	—	—		
Reason to Believe	Release date: May 29, 2026; Label: Virgin Music Group	—	—	42	—		
"—" denotes releases that did not chart

== Extended plays ==
Title	Details	Peak chart positions				Sales
Title	Details	US	US Country	AUS	CAN	Sales
Underground	Release date: October 28, 2016; Label: MCA Nashville	97	12	—	77	US: 6,500
Room to Spare: The Acoustic Sessions	Release date: November 16, 2018; Label: MCA Nashville	—	20	18	—	US: 5,000
"—" denotes releases that did not chart

== Singles ==
Year	Title	Peak chart positions					Certifications (sales threshold)	Album
Year	Title	US	US Country	US Country Airplay	CAN	CAN Country	Certifications (sales threshold)	Album
2011	"Mary Was the Marrying Kind"	—	45		—	—		Up All Night (and Deluxe Edition)
2011	"Somethin' 'Bout a Truck"	29	1		33	1	RIAA: 3× Platinum; ARIA: Platinum; RMNZ: Gold	Up All Night (and Deluxe Edition)
2012	"Beer Money"	51	7	3	58	1	RIAA: Platinum	Up All Night (and Deluxe Edition)
2013	"Hey Pretty Girl"	41	8	2	62	6	RIAA: Platinum; MC: Gold	Up All Night (and Deluxe Edition)
2013	"Young Love"	— (Note: "Young Love" did not enter the Hot 100, but peaked at number 4 on the Bubbling Under Hot 100 Singles chart, which acts as a 25-song extension of the Hot 100.)	26	22	83	43		Non-album singles
2014	"Dirt Road"	—	35	44	—	—		Non-album singles
2015	"I'm to Blame"	100	24	20	96	40	RIAA: Gold	Wild Ones
2015	"Running for You"	— (Note: "Running for You" did not enter the Hot 100, but peaked at number 11 on the Bubbling Under Hot 100 Singles chart, which acts as a 25-song extension of the Hot 100.)	25	13	—	31		Wild Ones
2017	"More Girls Like You"	66	8	4	—	3	RIAA: Gold; MC: Gold	Slowheart
2017	"Last Shot"	53	12	6	—	23	RIAA: Gold	Slowheart
2019	"The Bull"	—	—	55	—	—	ARIA: Platinum	Slowheart
2019	"She’s Mine"	— (Note: "She's Mine" did not enter the Hot 100, but peaked at number 13 on the Bubbling Under Hot 100 Singles chart, which acts as a 25-song extension of the Hot 100.)	24	17	—	41	RIAA: Gold; MC: Gold	Wild World
2021	"Good Life"	—	—	—	—	—		Non-album singles
2022	"Crazy One More Time" (Note: "Crazy One More Time" is a re-recording of a song from Up All Night.)	—	—	59	—	—		Non-album singles
2023	"Damn Love"	—	—	—	—	—		Damn Love
"—" denotes releases that did not chart

== Other charted songs ==
Year	Title	Peak chart positions		Album
Year	Title	US Country	CAN	Album
2015	"Wild Ones"	37	85	Wild Ones

== Music videos ==
Year	Title	Director
2011	"Mary Was the Marrying Kind"	Michael Maxxis
2011	"Somethin' 'Bout a Truck"	Roger Pistole
2012	"Somethin' 'Bout a Truck" (acoustic)	Stephen Shepherd
2012	"Hey Pretty Girl" (acoustic)	Stephen Shepherd
2012	"Beer Money"	Peter Zavadil
2013	"Hey Pretty Girl"	Chris Hicky
2014	"Young Love"	Peter Zavadil
2014	"Dirt Road"	Peter Zavadil
2014	"Heart's Desire" (live)	PJ Brown
2014	"On the Case"	
2015	"I'm to Blame"	Peter Zavadil
2015	"Comeback Kid"	PJ Brown
2015	"Girl of the Summer"	PJ Brown
2015	"What Ya Got on Tonight"	PJ Brown
2015	"Lipstick"	PJ Brown
2015	"Backseat"	PJ Brown
2016	"Running for You"	PJ Brown
2017	"More Girls Like You"	PJ Brown
2017	"The Bull"	PJ Brown
2017	"Blonde"	PJ Brown
2018	"Last Shot"	PJ Brown
2019	"She's Mine"	PJ Brown
2020	"Don't Go Changing"	Alex Ferrari
2021	"How High"	PJ Brown
2021	"Good Life"	PJ Brown
