= Wild Ones (Kip Moore album) =

Studio album by Kip Moore
- Released: August 21, 2015
- Genre: Country rock; heartland rock; roots rock
- Length: 47:32 (standard edition); 58:25 (deluxe edition)
- Label: MCA Nashville
- Producer: Chris DeStefano; Brett James; Kip Moore

Kip Moore chronology
Up All Night (2012)	Wild Ones (2015)	Slowheart (2017)

Singles from Wild Ones
- 1. "I'm to Blame" Released: February 2, 2015; 2. "Running for You" Released: October 12, 2015

Wild Ones is the second studio album by American country music artist Kip Moore, released on August 21, 2015, by MCA Nashville. Following the success of his 2012 debut album, Up All Night, Moore reteamed with producer Brett James and brought in Chris DeStefano to work on new content for his next country album. After its first two singles underperformed on the radio, Moore decided to scrap the project to write and record new material, crafting a more organic hard rock sound that supports the personal stories told throughout the thirteen tracks he co-wrote. Reviews for the record were positive, with critics praising Moore for incorporating rock elements throughout the track listing. Wild Ones debuted at numbers two and four on the Top Country Albums and Billboard 200 charts, respectively. It spawned two singles: "I'm to Blame" and "Running for You". To promote the album, Moore performed on talk shows and headlined tours across North America.

== Background and development ==
Moore released his debut studio album Up All Night on April 24, 2012. It garnered favorable reviews from critics, who praised the vocal delivery and lyrical storytelling. To promote the album, Moore spent the rest of 2012 and 2013 touring across the United States. Moore expressed excitement about preparing his sophomore effort, saying if the debut album was a "very nostalgic, looking back – type record", this would be "sonically and lyrically" intense and focus on the present. In November 2013, Moore released "Young Love", the leadoff single that underperformed on the Billboard Country charts. In April 2014, he announced that he delayed the album's May release until the summer, and released its next single "Dirt Road". After "Dirt Road" stalled on the radio and the album's expected fall release was pushed back into 2015, Moore scrapped it entirely to write and record a collection of new material. In an interview with Entertainment Weekly, Moore said that the overall sound of the album was more organic after several soundchecks creating different grooves and having the band play various parts of the songs. He also co-wrote all thirteen tracks on the record. Wild Ones was released on August 21, 2015, by MCA Nashville.

== Music and lyrics ==
The opening title track was described by Jon Freeman of Nash Country Weekly as "a simmering hymn about partying all night long." The song utilizes a "U2-ish synth" as a bassline for the drum-based percussion, banjos and hand claps throughout the arrangement. Magic" is described as a "soul-rock scorcher" that has Moore receive an unexplainable feeling he wants to hold onto, something he came up with because of his distrust of the fairy tale love songs on the radio. Roughstock's Matt Bjorke found the song overall to be "loud and lovely" because of its "anthemic, open-armed chorus". "That Was Us" is about the "small-town Saturday nights" that encapsulated Moore's teenage years in Georgia. "Lipstick" is a tribute to the road song, with Moore listing off his favorite cities he and his band like to perform at. The overall sound of the track utilizes a "Springsteen-esque riff" and some "pseudo-prototypical Mumfordian" shouts. "What Ya Got On Tonight" revolves around a man away from his girlfriend, pleading for a picture showing her outfit to keep him under control. "I'm to Blame" is a "mini-biography" about Moore willing to be the better man and admit the mistakes he's made in his past. "Running for You" is a "breakup anthem" about a relationship that's run its course but they wish each other well. Moore had originally written the track for his debut album Up All Night but cut it from the final track listing and scrapped the original version. The inspiration for the song came from two previous relationships Moore was in: one that treated him fairly and the other that didn't. He had also went against his team's wishes of letting other big name country singers record the track. The album closer, "Comeback Kid", is about the underdog that exists in every person.

== Singles and promotion ==
The album's first single, "I'm to Blame", was released on February 2, 2015. It peaked at numbers 20 and 24 on both the Billboard Country Airplay and Hot Country Songs charts, respectively. It was certified gold by the Recording Industry Association of America (RIAA) in the US on June 3, 2021. An accompanying music video was directed by Peter Zavadil and premiered in April 2015. The second and final single, "Running for You", was released on October 12, 2015. It peaked at numbers 13 and 25 on both the Country Airplay and Hot Country Songs charts, respectively. A music video for the single, directed by P. J. Brown, premiered in February 2016. While not released as a single, the album's title track managed to reach numbers 37 and 85 on both the Hot Country Songs and Canadian Hot 100 charts respectively.

On January 12, 2015, Moore was announced as an opening act alongside Maddie & Tae and Canaan Smith for Dierks Bentley on his Sounds of Summer Tour, starting on June 5 in Raleigh's Walnut Creek Amphitheatre and ending on September 12 in Bonner Springs' Cricket Wireless Amphitheater. On August 5 of that year, Moore announced a 20-city North American tour to support Wild Ones ahead of its release, beginning at Bethlehem, Pennsylvania and ending at Richmond, Virginia. On September 16, he performed "Come and Get It" on Jimmy Kimmel Live!. On December 2, Moore announced a second leg of his tour for 2016, starting in Milwaukee and finishing in Anaheim, California. On February 22 of that year, he performed "Running for You" on The Talk. On June 20, Moore announced the Me and My Kind Tour, which took place in the fall of 2016. Moore was joined by special guest Jon Pardi. On August 24, he performed the album's title track on The Late Show with Stephen Colbert.

== Critical reception ==
Professional ratings
Aggregate scores
Source	Rating
Metacritic	72/100
Review scores
Source	Rating
AllMusic	3/5 stars
Entertainment Weekly	B+
Nash Country Weekly	B+
PopMatters	6/10 stars

Wild Ones received mostly positive reviews from music critics. At Metacritic, which assigns a normalized rating out of 100 to reviews from mainstream critics, the album has an average score of 72 out of 100, which indicates "generally favorable reviews" based on 4 reviews.

AllMusic's Stephen Thomas Erlewine surmised that "[If] Kip's songs aren't as hook-heavy or as sticky as his idols, it is nevertheless admirable that he's completely revamped his sound so he doesn't feel like anybody else in contemporary country -- not his bro country peers, not Church, not a red dirt refugee or macho rocker. He's effectively evoked the feel and aesthetic of mid-'80s heartland rock, and if that doesn't necessarily make him a wild one, it does make him a rebel of sorts." Jon Freeman of Nash Country Weekly said, "The result feels a little something like those beloved '80s movies in spirit and aesthetic." Entertainment Weekly's Madison Vain commented on Moore's musical aspirations: "His follow-up has bigger ambitions: Wild Ones is Springsteen-style rock that reaches for the stadium's nosebleeds. Moore hasn't ditched his country roots entirely, but it's the burn-the-barn-down stompers like "Come and Get It" that stick." Jonathan Frahm of PopMatters suggested that "[I]f you're looking for something to break totally out of the rock-ready bro country mold, Wild Ones most certainly isn't your bag. If you're looking for something catchy, and somewhat more relatable than other offerings within the same expanse, than you've found just what you've needed." Jeffrey B. Remz of Country Standard Time also gave note of the album's overall sound being more rock heavy and encouraging crowd participation, and Moore's musicianship taking cues from Church, Springsteen ("Complicated", "I'm to Blame") and John Mellencamp ("Comeback Kid"), concluding that he "doesn't exactly go wild in stretching out, but with a voice that's real and songs that suit him well, the wait was the hardest part."

Entertainment Weekly ranked Wild Ones number five on their list of the 10 Best Country Albums of 2015. The magazine's writer Madison Vain said that Moore's "allegiance to classic rock" throughout the album may have hurt him than help him, noting that even accessible anthems like "Lipstick" and "Come and Get It" carry "too much heft for airplay EP's", but concluded that: "In the end, he may have written his own best defense on the swampy kiss-off "That's Alright With Me" when he growls, "Call me country, call me hippie/A wild cat from Dixie And if you do or don't like what you see/That's alright with me." It's more than alright, it rocks." Rolling Stone ranked it number six on their list of the 40 Best Country Albums of 2015. The magazine's writer Linda Ryan said that Moore's raspy delivery of "blue-collar heartland rock" calls back to Mellencamp's "Jack and Diane" when telling stories about "young rabble-rousers" not caring who judges them. She concluded that: "By the time he wraps up the record with the moody "Comeback Kid," he's tapped into the teenage rebel inside his listeners, reassuring underdogs that there's always a second chance." In 2017, Billboard contributor Chuck Dauphin placed two tracks from the album on his top 10 list of Moore's best songs: "Running for You" at number two and "I'm to Blame" at number six.

== Commercial performance ==
Wild Ones debuted at number four on the Billboard 200 and number two on the Top Country Albums chart with 40,000 equivalent album units; it sold 35,000 copies in its first week, with the remainder of its unit total reflecting the album's streaming activity and track sales. On the Billboard 200, it left the top 100 the week of October 3, 2015 and stayed on the chart for four weeks. As of July 2016, the album has sold 88,600 copies in the US. In Canada, it debuted and peaked at number five on the Canadian Albums chart for the week of September 12.

== Track listing ==
Wild Ones track listing
No.	Title	Writer(s)	Producers	Length
1.	"Wild Ones"	Kip Moore; Chris DeStefano; Brett James	Moore; DeStefano	3:24
2.	"Come and Get It"	Moore; James; Manny Medina	Moore; James	4:57
3.	"Girl of the Summer"	Moore; Troy Verges; Blair Daly	Moore; James	3:59
4.	"Magic"	Moore; Westin Davis; Luke Dick	Moore; James	3:38
5.	"That Was Us"	Moore; Davis; Dan Couch	Moore; James	4:01
6.	"Lipstick"	Moore; Justin Weaver; David Frasier; Davis	Moore; James	4:20
7.	"What Ya Got On Tonight"	Moore; Verges; Daly	Moore; James	3:02
8.	"Heart's Desire"	Moore; Couch; Adam Browder; Erich Wigdahl	Moore; James	4:23
9.	"Complicated"	Moore; DeStefano; Rodney Clawson	Moore; DeStefano	3:04
10.	"I'm to Blame"	Moore; Weaver; Davis	Moore; James	2:17
11.	"That's Alright with Me"	Moore; Couch; Dick	Moore; James	3:38
12.	"Running for You"	Moore; Verges; Daly	Moore; James	3:35
13.	"Comeback Kid"	Moore; Erik Dylan; Ross Copperman; Jeff Hyde	Moore; James	3:14
Total length:				47:32

Deluxe Edition
No.	Title	Writer(s)	Producers	Length
14.	"What I Do"	Caitlyn Smith; Moore; Steve Robson	Moore; James	3:28
15.	"Backseat"	Weaver; Keifer Thompson; Moore	Moore; James	3:22
16.	"Burn the Whole World Down"	Moore; James	Moore; James	4:03

== Personnel ==
Credits adapted from the album's liner notes.

Vocals

- Chris DeStefano – background vocals
- Brett James – background vocals
- Kip Moore – lead vocals

Production

- Nick Brophy – engineer, mixing
- Chris DeStefano – engineer, mixing, producer, programming
- Mike "Frog" Griffith – production coordination
- Brett James – producer
- Nate Lowery – production coordination
- Marc "Schmarx" Schneider – engineer, programming
- Justin Weaver – programming
- Hank Williams – mastering

Instruments

- Mike Brignardello – bass guitar
- Matthew Bubel – drums
- Tom Bukovac – guitar
- Dave Cohen – keyboards
- Chris DeStefano – bass guitar, drums, acoustic guitar, electric guitar, mandolin, piano, six-string banjo
- Lee Hendricks – bass guitar
- Jeff Hyde – banjo
- Tim Lauer – keyboards
- Rob McNelley – electric guitar
- Scotty Sanders – lap steel guitar
- Jimmie Lee Sloas – bass guitar
- Ilya Toshinsky – acoustic guitar

Imagery

- Craig Allen – design
- Kristin Barlowe – photography
- Kip Moore – art direction

== Charts ==
=== Weekly charts ===
Weekly chart performance for Wild Ones
Chart (2015–17)	Peak position
Australian Albums (ARIA)	31
Canadian Albums (Billboard)	5
US Billboard 200	4
US Top Country Albums (Billboard)	2

=== Year-end charts ===
Year-end chart performance for Wild Ones in 2015
Chart (2015)	Position
US Top Country Albums (Billboard)	49

== Release history ==
Release dates and formats for Wild Ones
Region	Date	Format(s)	Label	Ref.
United States	August 21, 2015	CD; digital download	MCA Nashville	
