= Nick Brophy =

American record producer

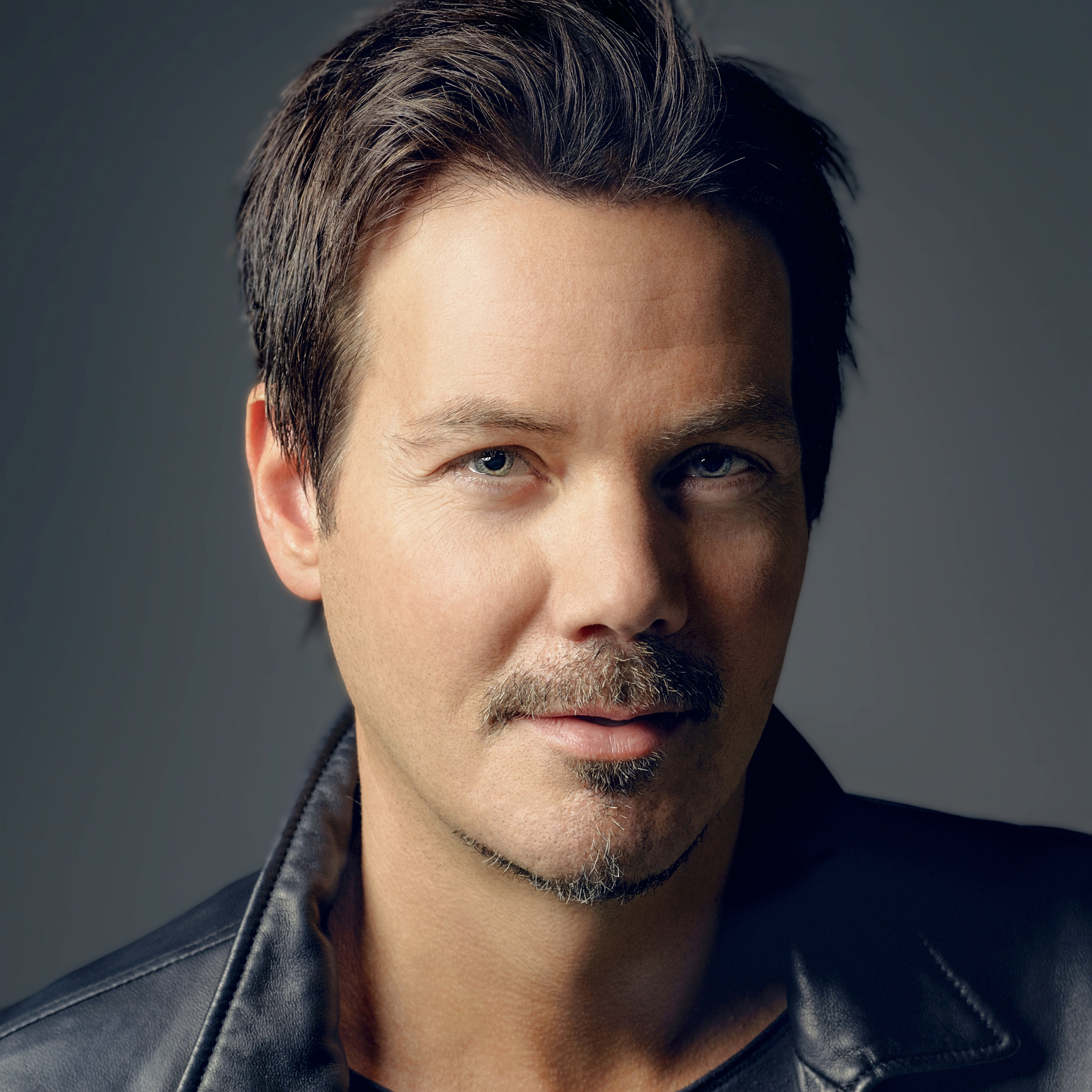

Background information
- Born: St. Louis, Missouri, United States
- Genres: Rock; Pop; Country
- Occupations: Producer; Engineer; Mixer; Songwriter
- Instrument: Multi-instrumentalist
- Years active: 1990-present
- Website: www.nickbrophy.com

Nick Brophy is an American mixer, sound engineer, record producer and songwriter. The artists he has collaborated with and written for include Jason Aldean, the Rolling Stones, Avril Lavigne, Hootie & the Blowfish, Kenny Chesney, Carly Simon, Taylor Swift, Garbage and Everclear. His engineering credits include Everclear's platinum Sparkle and Fade, Avril Lavigne's 6× platinum Let Go and the Rolling Stones 4× platinum 40 Licks. His mixing credits include three consecutive #1 singles by Kip Moore; 2× platinum Somethin' 'Bout a Truck, certified gold Beer Money and platinum Hey Pretty Girl, as well as Jimmy Fallon's Blow Your Pants Off, for which he won a Grammy. His songwriting credits include recordings by Hootie & the Blowfish, Jason Aldean, Kenny Chesney and Rascal Flatts.

== History ==
Brophy was born in St. Louis, Missouri but grew up all over the world. He spent time overseas in Japan, Greece, Egypt as well as many states in the U.S., eventually settling in Southern California. He began playing guitar at age 13 and was in several SoCal bands before joining Aircraft, a local band out of San Diego consisting of Ronnie Jones, Larry Madison, Rob Lamothe and Alan DeSilva. Aircraft relocated to Los Angeles where it performed shows at Hollywood's Whisky a Go Go, Troubadour, Gazzarri's, the Roxy and other venues. After disbanding in 1987, drummer Alan DeSilva contacted Lamothe and Brophy to form a new band.

== Career ==
=== Riverdogs ===
In 1988, together with DeSilva and Lamothe, Brophy formed the Riverdogs. Then Whitesnake guitarist, Vivian Campbell was helping produce the group's demos and later left to join the Riverdogs. In February 1989, Riverdogs signed to Tony Martell's imprint label Epic Associated Records and began pre-production on its debut album “Riverdogs” which was released in June 1990. The album was critically lauded and received Holland's Edison Award for best hard rock album of 1991. Campbell left the band in November 1990 and later joined Def Leppard. After 2 follow-up albums, 1992's “Absolutely Live” and 1993's “Bone”, the Riverdogs disbanded. During the making of “Bone”, Brophy assumed the role of engineer and in 1994 began engineering at the newly built Rondor Music Publishing studios in West Los Angeles.

=== Rondor Music ===
In 1994, after 3 months of working as an assistant engineer, Brophy was promoted to head engineer by Herb Alpert. During his 5 years at Rondor, Brophy engineered alongside veteran producers Lou Adler (the Mamas & the Papas, Carole King), Richard Perry (Harry Nilsson, Barbra Streisand, Art Garfunkel), Bones Howe (Elvis Presley, Tom Waits, the Fifth Dimension) and contemporary producers Greg Wells (Katy Perry, Adele, One Republic), Jay Joyce (Wallflowers, Patty Griffin, Eric Church) as well as writers and artists Michael Masser, Gerry Goffin, Olivia Newton-John, Everclear, and Garbage. While at Rondor, Brophy was signed to EMI Music Publishing and had international success with records by Trine Rein, Momoko, Jill Johnson, and Coco Lee as well as film and TV placements including ABC's "Wasteland" (theme song),> Eddie Murphy's “Pluto Nash”(movie trailer) and a song on the motion picture soundtrack for "The Wedding Planner".

=== World's End ===
In 2001, Brophy signed to World's End Producer Management. In Sept of 2001 he worked with the production team The Matrix on Avril Lavigne's “Let Go” album which eventually sold over 6 million copies. The following year Brophy engineered 3 albums with producer Don Was, which included Hootie & the Blowfish “Hootie & the Blowfish”, the Rolling Stones “40 Licks” and Carly Simon “Christmas Is Almost Here”. During his time at Worlds End, Nick worked on albums with producers Dave Sardy, Paul Lani and Was as well as producing an album for Warner Australia artist “Mishelle Bradford-Jones".

=== Nashville ===
In 2003, at the suggestion of friend and country artist Phil Vassar, Brophy re-located to Nashville, Tennessee. He arrived and began co-producing Phil Vassar's “Shaken Not Stirred”. In Nashville Nick has written, produced, engineered and mixed albums and singles with; Vassar, Taylor Swift, Jennifer Hanson, Hootie & the Blowfish, the JaneDear Girls, Kip Moore, Big & Rich, Jimmy Fallon and many others. Nick's work as a mixer has earned him several number 1's as well as Fallon's “Blow Your Pants Off” winning a Grammy for best comedy album.

=== Cornman Music ===
From 2015 to 2017 Brophy was a songwriter for Cornman Music, Brett James' publishing co-venture with Warner/Chappell Music. During this time he had recordings by Jason Aldean, Kenny Chesney, Rascall Flatts, Brooke Eden and The McClymonts.

=== LÒNIS ===
In 2018, Brophy teamed up with Jennifer Hanson to form the writing and production duo LÒNIS. Since then LÒNIS has cuts and production credits with multiple artists, and placements in film and television. Their songs have been heard on ABC, NBC, FOX, CMT, MTV, VH1, PBS, HGTV, The CW, Freeform, Netflix, Discovery Channel, Cox Communications, Hulu, Paramount+, TV Land, Showtime and in films and movie trailers for Sony, Columbia, Disney and Warner Bros Pictures. Notable placements have been Grey's Anatomy, The Bold Type, Younger, Selling Sunset, Station 19, Songland, Emily In Paris, Ghosted, A Million Little Things, My Kitchen Rules, Deadliest Catch, America's Got Talent, America's Funniest Home Videos, Astrid & Raphaëlle and Restored By The Fords, as well as in national and international advertising campaigns and promo spots for Xbox, Target, Ford, Coors Light and AdventHealth. LÒNIS has the title track in the Disney film Magic Camp and also a featured song in the Kristen Bell comedy Queenpins.

== Discography ==
Year	Artist	Album	Song title	Credit
2022	Josh Mirenda	Til The Neon's Gone (Single)	Til The Neon's Gone	Mixing
2021	John Morgan	Coldest Beer In Town (Single)	Coldest Beer In Town	Mixing
	Jon Wood	Drive (Single)	Drive	Mixing
	Tyler Farr	Cover Girl (Single)	Cover Girl	Mixing
	Alexander Ludwig	Summer Crazy (Single)	Summer Crazy	Mixing
	Alexander Ludwig	Alexander Ludwig (EP)	-	Mixing
	The Texas Tenors	Outside The Lines	-	Producer, Engineer, Mixing, Composer
	LÒNIS x Jon Mero	C'mon Right Now (Single)	C'mon Right Now	Producer, Engineer, Mixing, Composer
	Johnny Murphy	Ain't Gonna Be Lonely (Single)	Ain't Gonna Be Lonely	Mixing
	Chapel Hart	I Will Follow (Single)	I Will Follow	Producer, Engineer, Mixing, Composer
	Jeffrey East	Always Be Mine (Single)	Always Be Mine	Producer, Engineer, Mixing, Composer
	LÒNIS x Jon Mero	Time Is Now (Single)	Time Is Now	Producer, Engineer, Mixing, Composer
	LÒNIS	Here's To The Future (feat.JayXander) Single	Here's To The Future (feat.JayXander)	Producer, Engineer, Mixing, Composer
2020	Jon Wood	What Her Leavin' Left (Single)	What Her Leavin' Left	Mixing
	Hudson Moore	Nothin' Like This (Single)	Nothin' Like This	Mixing
	LÒNIS	Wonderful Place To Be (Single)	Wonderful Place To Be	Producer, Engineer, Mixing, Composer
	Michael Logen & Jennifer Hanson	Tides Will Turn (Single)	Tides Will Turn	Producer, Engineer, Mixing
	Chris Mann	Noise (EP)	-	Mixing
	The Buckleys	Daydream	Til You Can't Go Back	Composer
	LÒNIS & Jeffrey James	Ready For Somethin’ New (Single)	Ready For Somethin’ New	Producer, Engineer, Mixing, Composer
	LÒNIS	Some Magic (Single)	Some Magic	Producer, Engineer, Mixing, Composer
	Shelly Fairchild	Nothin Better (Single)	Nothin Better	Producer, Engineer, Mixing, Composer
	Michael Logen & Jennifer Hanson	Here's To Hoping (EP)	-	Producer, Engineer, Mixing, Composer
	LÒNIS	This Summer (feat. Jeffrey James) Single	This Summer (feat. Jeffrey James)	Producer, Engineer, Mixing, Composer
	LÒNIS	Ordinary (feat. Rayelle) Single	Ordinary (feat. Rayelle)	Producer, Engineer, Mixing, Composer
	Michael Logen & Jennifer Hanson	Here's To Hoping (Single)	Here's To Hoping	Producer, Engineer, Mixing, Composer
	Justin Forrest	Lighthouse (Single)	Lighthouse	Producer, Engineer, Mixing, Composer
	Carter Winter	Higher On You (Single)	Higher On You	Mixing
	LÒNIS & Jeffrey East	Believe (Single)	Believe	Producer, Engineer, Mixing, Composer
	Daniel Saint Black	Daniel Saint Black (EP)	When Things Break Apart	Producer, Engineer, Mixing, Composer
	Daniel Saint Black	Daniel Saint Black (EP)	Reason	Producer, Engineer, Mixing
	Daphne Willis	Feels Like Home (Single)	Feels Like Home	Producer, Engineer, Mixing, Composer
	Big & Rich	Stay Home (Single)	Stay Home	Producer, Engineer, Mixing
	Daniel Saint Black	When Things Break Apart (Single)	When Things Break Apart	Producer, Engineer, Mixing, Composer
	Jeffrey East	Brightest Stars (Single)	Brightest Stars	Producer, Engineer, Mixing, Composer
	Jeffrey East	Brightest Stars (Coffeehouse) Single	Brightest Stars (Coffeehouse)	Producer, Engineer, Mixing, Composer
	Alexander Ludwig	Let Me Be Your Whiskey (Single)	Let Me Be Your Whiskey	Mixing
2019	Mark Mackay	Always Rains In Portland (Single)	Always Rains In Portland	Mixing
	Humbear	Take Your Time (EP)	Favorite Place	Producer, Engineer, Mixing, Composer
	Daniel Saint Black	Reason (Single)	Reason	Producer, Engineer, Mixing
	Riverdogs	Pre-Production 1989	-	Producer, Engineer, Mixing, Composer
	Jeffrey East	Life After Love Volume One (EP)	-	Mixing
	Humbear	Favorite Place (Single)	Favorite Place	Producer, Engineer, Mixing, Composer
	LÒNIS	Assassin (Single)	Assassin	Producer, Engineer, Mixing, Composer
	Daphne Willis & LÒNIS	Work For It (Single)	Work For It	Producer, Engineer, Mixing, Composer
	Hudson Moore	Coming Home (Single)	Coming Home	Mixing
	Sam Tinnesz	We’re Gonna Make It (Single)	We’re Gonna Make It	Producer, Engineer, Mixing, Composer
	Jason Aldean	9	Some Things You Don't Forget	Composer
	Chris Mann	If You Ever Leave (Single)	If You Ever Leave	Mixing
	Rayelle & LÒNIS	TFW (That Feel When) Single	TFW (That Feel When)	Producer, Engineer, Mixing, Composer
	Mark Mackay	Get Me Through the Night (Single)	Get Me Through the Night	Mixing
	Hudson Moore	Universe (Single)	Universe	Mixing
	LÒNIS	Ready For This (Single)	Ready For This	Producer, Engineer, Mixing, Composer
	Chris Mann	Noise (Single)	Noise	Mixing
	Chris Mann	Gentleman (Single)	Gentleman	Mixing
	Jeffrey East	Retro (Single)	Retro	Mixing
2018	LÒNIS (feat. Daphne Willis)	Better Than Christmas (Single)	Better Than Christmas	Producer, Engineer, Mixing, Composer
	Harper Grae	Buck Moon Medleys (EP)	-	Producer, Engineer, Mixing, Composer
	Harper Grae	Monster (Single)	Monster	Producer, Engineer, Mixing
	Jeffrey East	Roller Rink (Single)	Roller Rink	Producer, Engineer, Mixing, Composer
	Harper Grae	Bloodline (Single)	Bloodline	Producer, Engineer, Mixing, Composer
	Jeffrey East	Time Is Cold (Single)	Time Is Cold	Mixing
	Jason Aldean	Rearview Town	I'll Wait For You	Composer
	Josh Mirenda	Josh Mirenda (EP)	-	Mixing
2017	Temecula Road	Everything Without You (Single)	Everything Without You	Composer
	Jennifer Hanson	Under The Tree (EP)	-	Producer, Engineer, Mixing, Composer
	Natalie Merchant	The Natalie Merchant Collection	-	Engineer
	Oskar Cartaya	Bajo Mundo	-	Mixing
	Jeffrey East	Still Crazy (Single)	Still Crazy	Producer, Engineer, Mixing
	Riverdogs	California	-	Producer, Engineer, Mixing, Composer
	Jeffrey East	Roller Rink (Single)	Roller Rink	Producer, Engineer, Mixing, Composer
	Big & Rich	Did It for the Party	-	Engineer, Mixing
	Rascal Flatts	Back To Us	Roller Rink	Composer
	Brooke Eden	Act Like You Don't (Single)	Act Like You Don't	Producer, Engineer, Mixing
	Big & Rich	California (Single)	California	Engineer, Mixing
	The McClymonts	Endless	Endless	Composer
2016	Michael Logen	Paper Thin	-	Composer
	Brooke Eden	Diamonds (Single)	Diamonds	Producer, Engineer, Mixing
	Kenny Chesney	Cosmic Hallelujah	Trip Around the Sun	Composer
	Jason Aldean	They Don't Know	The Way A Night Should Feel	Composer
	Brooke Eden	Welcome To the Weekend (EP)	-	Producer, Engineer, Mixing
	Brandon Ray	American Way (Single)	American Way	Producer, Engineer, Mixing
2015	Brooke Eden	Daddy's Money (Single)	Daddy's Money	Producer, Engineer, Mixing
	Andy Gibson	Best of Andy Gibson	The One	Composer
	Kip Moore	Wild Ones	-	Engineer, Mixing
2014	Brandon Chase	One (Single)	One	Mixing
	Dean Alexander	Live A Little (Single)	Live A Little	Mixing
	Various Artists	The Best of Me	Motion Picture Soundtrack	Engineer, Mixing
	Big & Rich	Gravity	-	Engineer, Mixing
	Cowboy Troy	King of Clubs	-	Engineer
	Various Artists	Nashville Outlaws: A Tribute To Mötley Crüe	-	Mixing
	Bill Engvall	Ultimate Laughs	-	Mixing
2013	Danielle Bradbery	Danielle Bradbery (Album)	Heart of Dixie	Mixing
	Danielle Bradbery	Danielle Bradbery (Single)	Heart of Dixie	Mixing
	Cowboy Mouth	This Train	-	Mixing
2012	Jimmy Fallon	Blow Your Pants Off	-	Mixing
	Big & Rich	Hillbilly Jedi	-	Engineer
	Cledus T. Judd	Parodyziac!!	-	Mixing
	The Farm	The Farm	-	Mixing
	Kip Moore	Up All Night	-	Mixing
	Bullet Saints	Hellbound (Single)	Hellbound	Mixing
	Bradley Gaskin	Diamonds Make Babies (Single)	Diamonds Make Babies	Engineer, Mixing
2011	Riverdogs	World Gone Mad	-	Producer, Engineer, Mixing, Composer
	Bradley Gaskin	Mr. Bartender (Single)	Mr. Bartender	Engineer, Mixing
	Footloose (2011)	Motion Picture Soundtrack	Fake ID	Mixing
	John Rich	For the Kids	-	Engineer, Mixing
	Victoria Shaw	Fa La La	Santa's Toy Ride	Composer
	Various Artists	My Country, Vol 2: Smash Hits	-	Vocal Producer, Mixing
	John Rich	Rich Rocks	-	Producer, Engineer, Mixing
	the JaneDear Girls	the JaneDear Girls	-	Vocal Producer, Engineer, Musician
2010	Ashlyne Huff	Ashlyne Huff	-	Producer, Engineer, Composer, Musician
	Natalie Merchant	Leave Your Sleep	-	Engineer
	Bleu Edmondson	The Future Ain't What It Used To Be	-	Engineer, Guitar
2009	Billie Myers	Tea & Sympathy	No Regrets Allowed	Composer
2008	Jessica Sierra	Deepest Secret (EP)	Deepest Secret	Producer, Engineer, Composer, Musician
	Rusty Truck	Luck's Changing Lanes	-	Engineer, Mixing
	Juliana Cole	Little More of Me	Deepest Secret	Composer
	Mark Bryan	End of the Front	-	Producer, Mixing, Mastering
	Cowboy Mouth	Fearless	-	Mixing
	Jennifer Hanson	73 (Single)	73	Producer, Engineer, Mixing
	Jennifer Hanson	Thankful	Joyride	Producer, Engineer, Mixing, Composer, Musician
	Jennifer Hanson	Thankful	Love Will Find A Way Around	Producer, Engineer, Mixing, Composer, Musician
	Jennifer Hanson	Thankful	Bittersweet	Producer, Engineer, Mixing, Composer, Musician
	Jennifer Hanson	Thankful	Won't Give Up	Producer, Engineer, Mixing, Musician
	Jennifer Hanson	Thankful	Thankful	Producer, Engineer, Mixing, Musician
	Jennifer Hanson	Thankful	73	Producer, Engineer, Mixing, Musician
	Jennifer Hanson	Thankful	Can't Get Back the Love	Producer, Engineer, Mixing, Composer, Musician
	Jennifer Hanson	Thankful	Incredible World	Producer, Engineer, Mixing, Composer, Musician
	Jennifer Hanson	Thankful	Kick the Jukebox	Producer, Engineer, Mixing, Composer
	Jennifer Hanson	Thankful	Believed To Be Seen	Producer, Engineer, Mixing, Composer, Musician
2007	Jessica Sierra	Unbroken (Single)	Unbroken	Producer, Engineer, Mixing, Composer
	Live Oak Decline	Gravity	-	Mixing
	Alana Grace	Break the Silence	The Other Side	Producer, Engineer, Mixing, Composer
	Jennifer Hanson	Joyride (Single)	Joyride	Producer, Engineer, Mixing, Composer
	Phil Vassar	Super Hits	-	Producer
2006	Radio Mundial	Momento Eterno	-	Engineer, Mixing
	Hootie & the Blowfish	Live In Charleston (DVD)	-	Composer
	Hootie & the Blowfish	Live In Charleston	-	Composer
	Django Walker	Six Trips Around the World	-	Mixing
	Cowboy Mouth	Voodoo Shoppe	-	Mixing
2005	Hector On Stilts	Same Height Relation	-	Mixing
	Hootie & the Blowfish	Looking for Lucky	Hey Sister Pretty	Composer
	Hootie & the Blowfish	Looking for Lucky	Get Out of My Mind	Composer
	The Sisterhood of the Traveling Pants	Motion Picture Soundtrack	Black Roses Red	Engineer, Producer
2004	Various Artists	The King of All Of Me	-	Producer, Engineer, Mixing, Musician
	The Mooney Suzuki	Alive & Amplified	-	Engineer
	Oskar Cartaya	My Music, My Friends, My Time	-	Engineer, Mixing
	Phil Vassar	Shaken Not Stirred	-	Producer, Engineer, Mixing, Musician
	Hundred Reasons	The Great Test	-	Editing
	Hundred Reasons	Shatterproof Is Not A Challenge	-	Editing
2003	The Revolution Smile	Above the Noise	-	Engineer, Editing
	Rusty Truck	Broken Promises	-	Mixing
	Mishelle Bradford-Jones	Firefly	-	Producer, Engineer, Mixing, Musician
	Various Artists	Handpicked, Vol 2	-	Producer, Mixing, Guitar, Loops
	Hootie & the Blowfish	Hootie & the Blowfish	-	Pro Tools
	Five Way Friday	Wrecked	-	Mixing, Mastering
	Patrick Davis	Chances Are	-	Engineer, Mixing
	Jamai Loman	Jamai	I Love the Sun	Composer
2002	Avril Lavigne	Let Go	-	Engineer, Programming
	Brooklyn Run	Brooklyn Run	-	Programming, Digital Editing
	Magna-Fi	Burn Out the Stars	-	Pro Tools
	Rolling Stones	Forty Licks	-	Engineer, Pro Tools
	Carly Simon	Christmas Is Almost Here Again	-	Digital Editing
	Carly Simon	Christmas Is Almost Here	-	Digital Editing
	Off By One	Off By One	-	Programming
2001	The Wedding Planner	Motion Picture Soundtrack	Life Is What You Make It	Producer, Composer
	Momoko	The Create Collection	-	Composer
	Rob Lamothe	Steering With My Knee	-	Composer
	Bosson	One In A Million	-	Guitar
2000	Jill Johnson	Daughter of Eve	Live for Today	Composer
	Yve Adam	Fiction	-	Assistant Engineer
	Mishelle Bradford-Jones	Stay (Single)	Stay	Producer, Engineer
	Tim James	I'll Be Your Secret	You (TV Series Wasteland)	Composer
	Coco Lee	You & Me	Brave	Composer
1999	Human Nature	Counting Down	-	Engineer
	Garbage	You Look So Fine	Get Bizzy with the Fizzy (Single B-Side)	Assistant Engineer
	Garbage	Version 2.0	-	Assistant Engineer
	Trine Rein	To Find the Truth	Stars and Angels	Arranger, Composer
1998	Human Nature	Cruel (Single)	Cruel	Engineer
	Various Artists	A Tribute To Tradition		Engineer
	Miss Jones	The Other Woman (Bonus Track)	-	Engineer
	Miss Jones	The Other Woman	-	Engineer
	Elliot	U.S. Songs	-	Engineer
1997	S.H.E.	3's A Charm	-	Engineer
	Vanessa Williams	Next	-	Assistant Engineer
	Everclear	So Much for the Afterglow (Bonus Videos DVD)	-	Assistant Engineer
	Everclear	So Much for the Afterglow (Japan Bonus Tracks)	-	Assistant Engineer
	Everclear	So Much For the Afterglow	-	Assistant Engineer
	Steel	Motion Picture Soundtrack	-	Engineer, Mixer
1996	Sherree Ford-Payne	Sherree Ford-Payne	-	Engineer
	Gerry Goffin	Back Room Blood	-	Engineer, Mixing
	The Borrowers	The Borrowers	-	Engineer
	Shaquille O'Neal	You Can't Stop the Rein	-	Engineer
1995	Various Artists	Sharks Patrol These Waters		Producer
	Everclear	Heroin Girl (Single)	Heroin Girl	Engineer
	Everclear	Sparkle & Fade (UK)	-	Engineer
	Everclear	Sparkle & Fade	-	Engineer
1994	Love Spit Love	Am I Wrong (Single)	Am I Wrong	Engineer
	Jade	Mind, Body & Song	-	Engineer
1993	Riverdogs	Bone	-	Engineer, Guitar, Vocals, Composer
	Ether	TV, Church and Bars	-	Guitar
1992	Rich Lang	Big Dream	-	Vocals (background)
	Riverdogs	Absolutely Live	-	Guitar, Vocals (background), Composer
1990	Riverdogs	Riverdogs	-	Guitar, Vocals (background), Composer

== Certified RIAA ==
Year	Date	Artist	Album/Song	Certified Units
1995	Mar 16	Jade	Mind, Body & Song	0.5 Million
1996	May 2	Everclear	Sparkle & Fade	1 Million
1998	Dec 24	Everclear	So Much for the Afterglow	2 Million
1999	Feb 24	Garbage	Version 2.0	1 Million
2003	Jan 24	Rolling Stones	Forty Licks	4 Million
2003	Apr 30	Avril Lavigne	Let Go	6 Million
2006	Mar 31	Avril Lavigne	Sk8er Boi (Single)	0.5 Million
2006	Mar 31	Avril Lavigne	I'm With You (Single)	0.5 Million
2013	Jun 17	Kip Moore	Beer Money (Single)	0.5 Million
2014	Dec 9	Kip Moore	Hey Pretty Girl (Single)	1 Million
2014	Dec 9	Kip Moore	Somethin' Bout A Truck (Single)	2 Million
2017	Feb 22	Big & Rich	Look At You (Single)	0.5 Million
2017	Aug 4	Kip Moore	Up All Night	1 Million
2017	Oct 2	Danielle Bradbery	Heart of Dixie (Single)	0.5 Million

== Grammy Related Works ==
Year	Artist	Album/Song	Category	Award
1996	Shaquille O'Neal	Stomp (Track)	Best R&B Performance By Duo or Group With Vocal	Nominated
1998	Everclear	El Distorto De Melodica	Best Rock Instrumental Performance	Nominated
1998	Garbage	Version 2.0	Best Rock Album	Nominated
1998	Garbage	Version 2.0	Album of the Year	Nominated
1999	Garbage	Special	Best Rock Performance By Duo or Group With Vocal	Nominated
2002	Avril Lavigne	Let Go	Best Pop Vocal Album	Nominated
2002	Avril Lavigne	Complicated	Song of the Year	Nominated
2002	Avril Lavigne	Complicated	Best Female Pop Vocal Performance	Nominated
2002	Avril Lavigne	Sk8er Boi	Best Female Rock Vocal Performance	Nominated
2012	Jimmy Fallon	Blow Your Pants Off	Best Comedy Album	Won
2017	Oskar Cartaya	Bajo Mundo	Best Latin Jazz Album	Nominated
2018	Kenny Chesney	Cosmic Hallelujah	Best Country Album	Nominated
