= Running for You =

Single by Kip Moore

from the album Wild Ones
- Released: October 12, 2015
- Recorded: 2015
- Genre: Country
- Length: 3:35
- Label: MCA Nashville
- Songwriters: Kip Moore; Troy Verges; Blair Daly
- Producer: Brett James

Kip Moore singles chronology
"I'm to Blame" (2015)	"Running for You" (2015)	"More Girls Like You" (2017)

"Running for You" is a song co-written and recorded by American country music artist Kip Moore. It was released to radio on October 12, 2015, as the second and final single from his second studio album Wild Ones (2015). Written by Moore, Troy Verges and Blair Daly, the song is about a relationship that's run its course but they wish each other well. "Running for You" peaked at numbers 13 and 25 on both the Billboard Country Airplay and Hot Country Songs charts respectively. The song has sold 99,000 copies in the United States as of July 2016. An accompanying music video for the single, directed by P. J. Brown, follows a couple's relationship ending because of their careers.

== Background and development ==
"Running for You" was written by Moore, Troy Verges and Blair Daly, and is about a relationship that's run its course but they wish each other well. Moore had originally written the track for his debut album Up All Night but cut it from the final track listing and scrapped the original version. The inspiration for the song came from two previous relationships Moore was in: one that treated him fairly and the other that didn't. He had also went against his team's wishes of letting other big name country singers record the track.

== Music video ==
The song's music video was directed by P. J. Brown and premiered in February 2016. The video revolves around a couple, an aspiring dancer and her musician boyfriend, with the former's career keeping her away from him. As they work in their respective fields, a montage of clips features them together in a hotel room, a snow-filled forest, and the empty streets of downtown Nashville. Dallas Cowboys cheerleader Jinelle Esther plays Moore's girlfriend.

== Live performance ==
On February 22, 2016, Moore performed a "stripped-down version" of "Running for You" on The Talk.

== Chart performance ==
"Running for You" has sold 99,000 copies in the US as of July 2016.

=== Weekly charts ===
Chart (2015–2016)	Peak position
US Bubbling Under Hot 100 (Billboard)	11
US Country Airplay (Billboard)	13
US Hot Country Songs (Billboard)	25

=== Year end charts ===
Chart (2016)	Position
US Country Airplay (Billboard)	54
US Hot Country Songs (Billboard)	68
