= Marquee Sign (song) =

Single by Sara Evans

from the album Words
- Released: June 9, 2017
- Genre: Country; country pop
- Length: 4:00
- Label: Born to Fly
- Songwriter(s): Sara Evans; Heather Morgan; Jimmy Robbins
- Producer(s): Sara Evans; Mark Bright

Sara Evans singles chronology
| "Put My Heart Down" (2014) | "Marquee Sign" (2017) | "All the Love You Left Me" (2018) |

"Marquee Sign" is a song written by Sara Evans, Heather Morgan and Jimmy Robbins, and recorded by Evans for her 2017 studio album, Words. It was the lead single off the album and was released via her own recording label entitled Born to Fly Records. The song was Evans' first single release in three years since leaving RCA Nashville and would be one of three singles spawned from the Words album. The song was received positively by music critics and writers.

== Background and content ==
"Marquee Sign" was composed by Evans herself, along with Heather Morgan and Jimmy Robbins. In the lyrics, the narrator recalls feelings for an ex lover and wishes she could have seen his faults on display, like a marquee sign. The song was recorded at three studios, including Starstruck Entertainment located in Nashville, Tennessee. Featured performing background vocals was Evans' daughter Olivia, who was 14 at the time of the song's recording. "Marquee Sign" was produced by Evans and Mark Bright. Previously, Bright had produced Evans' 2005 hit album, Real Fine Place and her 2014 album, Slow Me Down.

== Critical reception ==
"Marquee Sign" received mostly positive reviews from critics and writers following its release. Jon Freeman of Rolling Stone praised the song's musical styling and Evans' vocals in his review: "Evans applying her signature vibrato to a sleek, pop-tinged arrangement that combines moody instrumental atmospherics with a restless groove." Sydney Smith of Sounds Like Nashville also praised the song: "Get your shades on, because Sara Evans is getting ready to light up the airwaves with her new single Marquee Sign." Taste of Country's Sterling Whitaker positively commented on the song's production, finding a nice pairing between acoustic and electric arrangements. However, Markos Papadatos of the Digital Journal only gave the song one out of five possible stars in his review: "From start to finish, the song is a complete mess, coupled with a weak production makes it difficult to sustain the listener's attention throughout. It is bound to flop from a commercial standpoint."

== Release and music video ==
"Marquee Sign" was released as the lead single to Evans' upcoming studio album on June 9, 2017. It was issued as a single independently via her own recording label entitled Born to Fly Records. It was Evans' first single release in three years since leaving her long-time record label, RCA Nashville. In a 2016 interview, Evans commented that she was expecting the song to be a charting hit single: "I would like to do another big radio splash, big hits, big tour again. I’m just waiting for the ‘bro-country’ stuff to get on its way out." The song did not chart on any major Billboard publication, most notably the Hot Country Songs chart, where Evans placed over a dozen major hits. Evans' album, Words, was later released in July 2017, and included the lead single.

In August 2017, a music video was released for "Marquee Sign" that was directed by Peter Zavadil. In the past, Zavadil had directed several of Evans' music videos. The video featured Evans sitting at a bar in Nashville, Tennessee watching various people entering and exiting. Liv Stecker of The Boot also commented that the video included "Evans' retro makeup and jumpsuit conjures up something akin to morning-after regret, old Las Vegas style."

== Track listing ==
2017 digital download

- "Marquee Sign" – 4:00

2018 digital remixes

- "Marquee Sign" (Simon Reid Red Remix) – 3:53
- "Marquee Sign" (Simon Reid Yellow Remix) – 3:47
- "Marquee Sign" (Simon Reid Blue Remix) – 4:01
