= Slowheart =

Studio album by Kip Moore
- Released: September 8, 2017
- Genre: Country rock; heartland rock; roots rock
- Length: 46:47
- Label: MCA Nashville
- Producer: Luke Dick; David Garcia; Kip Moore

Kip Moore chronology
Wild Ones (2015)	Slowheart (2017)	Wild World (2020)

Singles from Slowheart
- 1. "More Girls Like You" Released: February 10, 2017; 2. "Last Shot" Released: November 20, 2017; 3. "The Bull" Released: March 4, 2019

Professional ratings
Review scores
Source	Rating
AllMusic	5/5 stars
Exclaim!	6/10
Roughstock	4/5 stars
Sounds Like Nashville	Positive

Slowheart is the third studio album by American country music artist Kip Moore, released on September 8, 2017, through MCA Nashville. The album's lead single, "More Girls Like You", was released on February 10, 2017.

== Background and recording ==
Following the release and touring behind 2015's Wild Ones, Moore took time off to travel, surf and write music. He tells Rolling Stone that Slowheart falls "somewhere between Americana, rock and the evocative storytelling of country."

The album, which Moore produced about 75% of, has less of a "band in the room sound" and more of a vintage, "vocals out front" sound. Moore claims he drew inspiration for the album from Motown music and also '70s classic rock music. The songs "Plead the Fifth" and "The Bull" were not written in any part by Moore, which makes Slowheart Moore's first release to feature songs not written or co-written by him.

Moore said of the album's theme that:

The term Slowheart has always been dear to me, but then it finally made sense with this record of coming to grips with my own vulnerabilities, my own hopes, my own stubbornness – the long journey that it took to get to where I'm at, and the clarity I'm at now. I think for sure this is the most vulnerable I've been on a record... the first one is still stuck in that same stubborn place of dealing with the same issues that I've faced before, still staying stuck in that spot and not doing anything about it, still feeling that sorrow. Whereas the second half is more hopeful in terms of who I hope to be the next time I'm faced with certain things.

== Release ==
=== Singles ===
The lead single from Slowheart, "More Girls Like You", was released on February 10, 2017. The album's release was then preceded by the release of four additional songs to digital outlets and streaming services: "The Bull" (August 11, 2017), "Blonde" (August 18, 2017), "Bittersweet Company" (August 25, 2017) and "Plead the Fifth" (September 1, 2017).

==== Promotional singles ====
Four promotional singles were released from the album: "The Bull" on August 11, 2017, "Blonde" on August 18, 2017, "Bittersweet Company" on August 25, 2017, and "Plead the Fifth" on September 1, 2017.

=== Album ===
On August 31, 2017, Slowheart was made available to stream in its entirety through NPR's "First Listen" program.

== Commercial performance ==
Slowheart debuted at number three on the Billboard Country Albums chart and number ten on the all-genre US Billboard 200, moving 29,000 equivalent album units; it sold 25,000 copies in its first week, with the remainder of its unit total reflecting the album's streaming activity and track sales. It marks Moore's third straight top ten full-length album, following 2012's Up All Night and 2015's Wild Ones. As of January 2019, the album has sold 56,200 copies in the United States.

== Title and artwork ==
Slowheart's title comes from a nickname given to Moore by a bandmate, referring to the slow pace at which he shows his emotions. Moore's band is also named "The Slowhearts". The album's cover artwork features a photo taken of Moore in Costa Rica, where he found inspiration for the album.

== Track listing ==
Source: Rolling Stone

No.	Title	Writer(s)	Producer(s)	Length
1.	"Plead the Fifth"	Luke Dick; Josh Kear	Moore	3:22
2.	"Just Another Girl"	Kip Moore; Westin Davis; Ben Helson	Moore	3:47
3.	"I've Been Around"	Moore; Dan Couch	Moore; Dick	3:37
4.	"Fast Women"	Moore; Davis; Blair DalyTroy Verges	Moore	3:38
5.	"Bittersweet Company"	Moore; Verges; Josh Miller	Moore	3:28
6.	"Sunburn"	Moore; Miller; David Garcia; Steven Olsen	Moore; Garcia	3:40
7.	"More Girls Like You"	Moore; Miller; Garcia; Olsen	Moore; Garcia	2:34
8.	"The Bull"	Dick; Jon Randall	Dick	3:09
9.	"Blonde"	Moore; Miller; Garcia; Olsen	Moore; Garcia	3:28
10.	"Good Thing"	Moore; Miller; Verges	Moore	2:50
11.	"Last Shot"	Moore; Couch; David Lee Murphy	Moore	3:48
12.	"Try Again"	Moore; Miller; Garcia	Moore; Garcia	4:03
13.	"Guitar Man"	Moore; Couch; Davis	Moore	5:23
Total length:				46:47

== Personnel ==
Credits adapted from AllMusic.

Vocals

- Luke Dick – background vocals
- Josh Miller – background vocals
- Kip Moore – background vocals, lead vocals

Musicians

- Matthew Bubel – drums, percussion
- Tom Bukovac – acoustic guitar, electric guitar
- Dave Cohen – keyboards
- Luke Dick – bass guitar, drums, acoustic guitar, electric guitar, harmonica, keyboards, percussion, programming
- David Garcia – bass guitar, drums, electric guitar, keyboards, programming
- Rob McNelly – electric guitar
- Kip Moore – acoustic guitar, electric guitar
- Danny Rader – acoustic guitar, electric guitar
- Jimmie Lee Sloas – bass guitar
- Dan Tyminski – mandolin
- Erich Wigdahl – drums, percussion

Technical personnel

- Craig Allen – package design
- Sarah Marie Burke – production coordination
- Luke Dick – engineer, producer (3,8)
- David Garcia – engineering, mixing, producer (6,7,9,12)
- Joe LaPorta – mastering
- Jason Lehning – mixing
- Bruce McPeters – cover design
- Kip Moore – art direction, producer (all tracks except "The Bull")
- Dave Salley – engineering, mixing

== Charts ==
=== Weekly charts ===
Chart (2017)	Peak position
Australian Albums (ARIA)	6
Canadian Albums (Billboard)	10
New Zealand Heatseekers Albums (RMNZ)	6
Scottish Albums (OCC)	78
US Billboard 200	10
US Top Country Albums (Billboard)	3

=== Year-end charts ===
Chart (2017)	Position
US Top Country Albums (Billboard)	88

== Release history ==
Region	Date	Format(s)	Label	Ref.
United States	September 8, 2017	streaming; CD; digital download; vinyl	MCA Nashville	
