= Wild World (Kip Moore album) =

Studio album by Kip Moore
- Released: May 29, 2020
- Studio: The Tracking Room (Nashville); Southern Ground (Nashville); The Castle Recording Studio (Nashville); Skulltown Studios (Nashville); Loud Recording; (Nashville)
- Genre: Country
- Length: 48:08
- Label: MCA Nashville
- Producer: Blair Daly; Luke Dick; David Garcia; Kip Moore

Kip Moore chronology
Slowheart (2017)	Wild World (2020)	Damn Love (2023)

Singles from Wild World
- 1. "She's Mine" Released: August 9, 2019

Wild World is the fourth studio album by American country music singer Kip Moore. It was released on May 29, 2020, by MCA Nashville. The album includes the single "She's Mine". A deluxe edition containing four extra songs was released on February 12, 2021.

== Content ==
The album contains thirteen tracks, of which Moore co-wrote all but one. Among his contributions to the album is the lead single "She's Mine". Moore co-produced the album with David Garcia, Luke Dick, and Blair Daly, all of whom also wrote some of the songs on it. Other contributing writers include touring band members Erich Wigdahl, Manny Medina, Dave Nassie, and Adam Browder, who helped him write "South" during a sound check. Moore also said that "Payin' Hard" was inspired by the death of his father, which occurred right before the release of his debut album.

On October 29, 2020, Moore released the song "Don't Go Changing" ahead of the release of the deluxe edition.

== Critical reception ==
Billy Dukes of Taste of Country reviewed the album favorably, calling it his "most urgent album to date", praising the lyrics of "Southpaw", "Fire and Flame", and "Payin' Hard" in particular while also noting the varied influences in the arrangement and production.

== Track listing ==
No.	Title	Writer(s)	Producer(s)	Length
1.	"Janie Blu"	Kip Moore; Dan Couch	Moore	4:01
2.	"Southpaw"	Moore; Westin Davis	Moore	4:04
3.	"Fire and Flame"	Moore; Cary Barlowe; Brett James; Will Weatherly	Moore	4:44
4.	"Wild World"	Moore; Josh Miller	Moore	3:40
5.	"Red White Blue Jean American Dream"	Jimi Bell; Barton Davies; Luke Dick; Philip Lammonds	Dick	3:00
6.	"She’s Mine"	Moore; Couch; Scott Stepakoff	Moore	3:49
7.	"Hey Old Lover"	Moore; Moore	Moore	2:59
8.	"Grow on You"	Moore; Davis; Blair Daly	Moore; Daly	3:07
9.	"More than Enough"	Moore; Miller; David Garcia	Moore; Garcia	3:20
10.	"Sweet Virginia"	Moore; Manny Medina; Erich Wigdahl	Moore	4:32
11.	"South"	Moore; Couch; Medina; Wigdahl; Adam Browder; Dave Nassie	Moore	4:17
12.	"Crazy for You Tonight"	Moore; Davis; Daly	Moore	3:47
13.	"Payin' Hard"	Moore; Davis; Daly	Moore	2:48
Total length:				48:08

Deluxe Edition
No.	Title	Writer(s)	Producer(s)	Length
14.	"Don't Go Changing"	Moore; Davis; Daly	Moore	3:27
15.	"Midnight Slow Dance"	Moore; Couch; Mike Elizondo	Moore	3:13
16.	"How High"	Moore; Dick; Davis; Bobby Terry	Dick	3:38
17.	"Man's Gotta Do"	Moore; Couch; Davis	Moore	3:47
Total length:				62:05

== Personnel ==
Adapted from the album's liner notes.

Vocals

- Kip Moore – lead vocals (all tracks), background vocals (tracks 4, 6, 8, 10, 12)
- Brett James – background vocals (track 3)
- Rick Huckaby – background vocals (tracks 2, 11)
- Luke Dick – background vocals (tracks 5, 16)

Instruments

- Kip Moore – acoustic guitar (tracks 2, 9, 12)
- Rob McNelley – acoustic guitar (track 1), electric guitar (tracks 1, 7, 8)
- Tom Bukovac – acoustic guitar (track 10), electric guitar (tracks 2–4, 6, 7, 10–15, 17)
- Dave Nassie – acoustic guitar (track 13), electric guitar (tracks 10, 11, 15)
- Kenny Greenberg – electric guitar (track 16)
- Danny Rader – electric guitar (track 6)
- Rich Brinsfield – bass guitar (tracks 1, 3, 4, 6, 7, 10, 12, 14, 15, 17)
- Manny Medina – bass guitar (tracks 2, 11)
- David Garcia – bass guitar (track 9), electric guitar (track 9), keyboards (track 9), programming (track 9)
- Blair Daly – bass guitar (track 8), programming (track 8)
- Luke Dick – bass guitar (track 5, 16), electric guitar (5, 16), drums (track 5), keyboards (tracks 5, 16)
- Matt Bubel – drums (tracks 3, 4, 6, 7, 12, 14), percussion (tracks 4, 7, 11), programming (track 11)
- Fred Eltringham — drums (track 16)
- Miles McPherson — drums (track 9)
- Erich Wigdahl – drums (tracks 1, 2, 11, 13, 15, 17)
- Will Weatherly – percussion (track 3), programming (track 3)
- Dave Cohen – keyboards (tracks 1–4, 6, 7, 10–15, 17), piano (track 6)

Production

- Kip Moore – producer (all tracks except 5 & 16)
- Blair Daly – producer (track 8)
- David Garcia – producer (track 9), recording, mixing
- Luke Dick – producer (track 5, 16), recording, mixing
- Dave Salley – recording, mixing
- Joe LaPorta – mastering (Sterling Sound)

Imagery

- Kip Moore – art direction
- Marc Harkness – cover art design
- Craig Allen – design
- Spidey Smith – photography
- Debra Wingo – grooming
- Katy Robbins – wardrobe stylist
- Kera Jackson – art production
- Sarah Marie Burke – A&R production

== Charts ==
Chart performance for Wild World
Chart (2020)	Peak position
Australian Albums (ARIA)	4
Canadian Albums (Billboard)	53
Scottish Albums (OCC)	15
UK Album Downloads (OCC)	14
UK Country Albums (OCC)	2
US Billboard 200	36
US Top Country Albums (Billboard)	5
