= Brett James (album) =

Studio album by Brett James
- Released: September 12, 1995
- Genre: Country
- Length: 37:59
- Label: Career
- Producer: Steve Bogard; Mike Clute

Brett James is the only album of American country music singer-songwriter Brett James. It was released on September 12, 1995, via Arista Nashville's Career Records division. The singles "Female Bonding", "If I Could See Love" and "Worth the Fall" all entered the Hot Country Songs charts.

== Critical reception ==
A staff review from Allmusic gave Brett James three stars out of five, calling it "a hard-rocking set of original songs that owe a great debt to honky tonk and traditional country." Richard McVey II of Country Standard Time described the album as "pretty much your standard country record with average material and average vocals that leads to an average review of an average artist."

== Track listing ==
- All songs written or co-written by Brett James; co-writers indicated in parentheses.
1. "Wake Up and Smell the Whiskey" (Dean Miller) – 2:52
2. "Many Tears Ago" (Hunter Armistead) – 3:53
3. "Worth the Fall" – 3:00
4. "She's Killin' Me" (Jennifer Kimball) – 4:04
5. "If I Could See Love" (Steve Bogard) – 3:02
6. "Female Bonding" – 3:18
7. "Dark Side of the Moon" – 4:12
8. "Just Like We Never Happened" – 3:28
9. "Thrill of the Chase" – 2:43
10. "The Way That You Love" – 3:50
11. "Enjoy the Ride" – 3:37

== Singles ==
Year	Single	Peak chart positions	
Year	Single	US Country	CAN Country
1995	"Female Bonding"	60	89
1995	"If I Could See Love"	68	—
1995	"Worth the Fall"	73	—
"—" denotes releases that did not chart

== Personnel ==
Musicians

- Bruce Bouton – steel guitar
- Paul Franklin – steel guitar
- Rob Hajacos – fiddle
- Dann Huff – electric guitar
- Jeff King – electric guitar
- Chris Leuzinger – electric guitar
- Chris Rodriguez – background vocals
- Matt Rollings – piano
- John Wesley Ryles – background vocals
- Judson Spence – background vocals
- Biff Watson – acoustic guitar
- Dennis Wilson – background vocals
- Lonnie Wilson – drums
- Glenn Worf – bass guitar

Technical

- Steve Bogard – producer
- Mike Clute – producer, recording, mixing
- Glenn Meadows – mastering
