= Last Shot =

Single by Kip Moore

from the album Slowheart
- Released: November 20, 2017
- Genre: Country
- Length: 3:48
- Label: MCA Nashville
- Songwriter(s): Kip Moore; Dan Couch; David Lee Murphy
- Producer(s): Kip Moore

Kip Moore singles chronology
"More Girls Like You" (2017)	"Last Shot" (2017)	"The Bull" (2019)

"Last Shot" is a song co-written and recorded by American country music singer Kip Moore. It is the second single to his third studio album Slowheart. Moore wrote the song with Dan Couch and David Lee Murphy, and produced it himself.

== Content ==
Moore told Sounds Like Nashville that the idea came about when writing with his frequent collaborator Dan Couch. He said that he wanted to give the song an "Aerosmith vibe", and when he started singing a melody to Couch, third writer David Lee Murphy offered the lyric "If you were my last breath, I'd just want to hold you." Upon hearing the line, Moore decided to use the concept of how "the word 'love' is used all too often" to create "an old school country love song".

== Commercial performance ==
The song peaked at number 6 on Country Airplay for chart dated December 8, 2018. has sold 75,000 copies in the United States as of January 2019.

== Music video ==
Directed by PJ Brown, the video premiered in January 2018 and features stories of four different friends, one of whom is terminally ill, who unite to have an eventful experience together before they can no longer do so. Moore himself is not present in the video at all. An alternate video, also directed by PJ Brown, features Moore performing the song inside a glass box.

== Charts ==
=== Weekly charts ===
Chart (2017–2019)	Peak position
Canada Country (Billboard)	31
US Billboard Hot 100	53
US Country Airplay (Billboard)	6
US Hot Country Songs (Billboard)	12

=== Year-end charts ===
Chart (2018)	Position
US Country Airplay (Billboard)	56
US Hot Country Songs (Billboard)	69

Chart (2019)	Position
US Hot Country Songs (Billboard)	81

== Certifications ==
Certifications for Last Shot
Region	Certification	Certified units/sales
United States (RIAA)	Gold	500,000^{‡}
^{‡} Sales+streaming figures based on certification alone.
