= Beer Money =

Single by Kip Moore

from the album Up All Night
- Released: July 9, 2012
- Recorded: 2012
- Genre: Country
- Length: 3:38
- Label: MCA Nashville
- Songwriters: Kip Moore; Blair Daly; Troy Verges
- Producer: Brett James

Kip Moore singles chronology
"Somethin' 'Bout a Truck" (2011)	"Beer Money" (2012)	"Hey Pretty Girl" (2013)

"Beer Money" is a song co-written and recorded by American country music artist Kip Moore. It was released in July 2012 as his third single from his debut album Up All Night (2012). Moore wrote the song with Blair Daly and Troy Verges. The song received positive reviews from critics who praised Moore's vocals and storytelling abilities for elevating the ordinary material.

"Beer Money" peaked at number three on the Billboard Country Airplay chart. It also charted at numbers seven and 51 on both the Hot Country Songs and Hot 100 charts respectively. It was certified Platinum by the Recording Industry Association of America (RIAA), denoting sales of over one million units in that country. In Canada, it peaked at number one on the Country chart and number 58 on the Canadian Hot 100 chart. An accompanying music video for the song, directed by Peter Zavadil, tells two stories: Moore picking up his girlfriend from work to a late night barn party where he performs and a group of men stealing a beer keg to said party. It was nominated for Breakthrough Video of the Year at the 2013 CMT Music Awards.

== Critical reception ==
Billy Dukes of Taste of Country gave the song three and a half stars out of five, writing that "what takes this song past ordinary is Moore's grave vocals and story-telling ability." Matt Bjorke of Roughstock also gave the song a favorable review, calling it "another strong mood-setting, sing-a-long ready country/rocker." In 2017, Billboard contributor Chuck Dauphin placed "Beer Money" at number one on his top 10 list of Moore's best songs.

== Music video ==
The accompanying music video was directed by Peter Zavadil and premiered in September 2012. The video starts with Moore playing a mechanic who gets into an argument with his boss (played by Moore's real-life manager Shawn McSpadden). It then follows him picking up his girlfriend from a diner and taking her to a late night barn party where he performs. The video also follows a group of men stealing a keg from a beer delivery truck driver and taking it to said party. It was nominated for Breakthrough Video of the Year at the 2013 CMT Music Awards but it went to Florida Georgia Line's "Cruise".

== Chart performance ==
"Beer Money" debuted at number 57 on the Billboard Hot Country Songs chart for the week of July 7, 2012. It peaked at number seven the week of December 28, and remained on the chart for thirty-two weeks. On the Billboard Hot 100, it debuted at number 99 for the week of October 6. Twelve weeks later, it peaked at number 51 the week of December 28, and stayed on the chart for twenty weeks. In Canada, the song debuted at number 90 on the Canadian Hot 100 for the week of November 24. Eight weeks later, it peaked at number 58 and stayed on the chart for twelve weeks.

=== Weekly charts ===
Chart (2012–2013)	Peak position
Canada (Canadian Hot 100)	58
Canada Country (Billboard)	1
US Billboard Hot 100	51
US Country Airplay (Billboard)	3
US Hot Country Songs (Billboard)	7

=== Year-end charts ===
Chart (2012)	Position
US Hot Country Songs (Billboard)	59
Chart (2013)	Position
US Country Airplay (Billboard)	61
US Hot Country Songs (Billboard)	63

== Certifications ==
Region	Certification	Certified units/sales
United States (RIAA)	Platinum	1,000,000^{‡}
^{‡} Sales+streaming figures based on certification alone.
