= Slow Me Down (song) =

Single by Sara Evans

from the album Slow Me Down
- Released: September 23, 2013
- Recorded: 2013
- Genre: Country pop
- Length: 3:04 (radio edit); 3:15 (album version)
- Label: RCA Nashville
- Songwriters: Marv Green, Heather Morgan, Jimmy Robbins
- Producers: Mark Bright, Sara Evans

Sara Evans singles chronology
"Anywhere" (2012)	"Slow Me Down" (2013)	"Put My Heart Down" (2014)

Music video
- "Slow Me Down" on YouTube

"Slow Me Down" is a song written by Marv Green, Heather Morgan and Jimmy Robbins and recorded by American country music artist Sara Evans. It was released on September 3, 2013, as a digital download and to country radio on September 23, 2013, as the first single and title track from Evans’ 2014 album of the same name. Evans debuted the new single during her annual fanclub party in June 2013, and premiered the studio cut of the song exclusively through her official website following a campaign to unlock the audio stream.

== Content ==
"Slow Me Down" is a mid-tempo country ballad, backed by plucked strings and guitar. The song is sung from the perspective of a woman threatening to walk out on her man, finishing by saying that if he has something to say that he should "hurry up and slow [her] down."

Speaking of the song with Billboard, Evans said: "There's definitely something about it. That's what we all felt when we heard it. When they pitched it to us, it was so emotional and the thought of 'Hurry Up and Slow Me Down' is one of the best lines I have heard in a song in so long. I'm very lucky they pitched it to me." She also told The Boot that she was excited about the recording process: "I love songs that evoke emotion—it really is what connects people to the music. When we went into the studio to record ['Slow Me Down'] my main goal was to capture the desperation and passion in the song—to strike a balance between a strong vocal and the emotion that would pull in the listener."

== Critical reception ==
"Slow Me Down" received mostly positive reviews from critics. Ben Foster of Country Universe awarded the song a B rating, comparing it to Lorrie Morgan's "Five Minutes." Foster spoke favorably of the vocal performance, saying that "Evans gives the song all she’s got, delivering a forceful performance of the chorus while rendering the song’s title phrase with a plaintive trill." However, he felt the song's production was too loud and not country enough in its sound. In reviewing the Slow Me Down album, Billboard's Chuck Dauphin called the song "the strongest definition of the word 'Power Ballad'" and stated that "Evans’ dramatic performance brings to mind a good episode of such 80s dramas as Dallas or Knots Landing. Pure ear candy." However Taste of Country's Billy Dukes gave the song two-and-a-half stars out of five, praising its "big vocal showcase," while drawing criticisms of its lyrics and generic arrangement.

== Music video ==
The music video, directed by Peter Zavadil, was shot primarily at Club Anthem in Nashville, Tennessee in September 2013, and NASCAR driver Carl Edwards appears in the video as Evans' love interest. "Sara and her group thought it would be fun for me to be part of it. [...] It was a neat thing to let me [be] part of something with her," Edwards said. "It will be neat for the people in central Missouri to see two central Missouri folks in that video." The video premiered on October 23, 2013.

== Chart performance ==
"Slow Me Down" debuted at number 57 on the U.S. Billboard Country Airplay chart for the week of September 14, 2013. It sold 15,000 copies in its first week of release. As of April 2014, the song has sold 179,000 copies in the U.S.

Chart (2013–2014)	Peak position
Canada Country (Billboard)	33
US Billboard Hot 100	89
US Country Airplay (Billboard)	17
US Hot Country Songs (Billboard)	19

=== Year-end charts ===
Chart (2014)	Position
US Country Airplay (Billboard)	70
US Hot Country Songs (Billboard)	75
