= Put My Heart Down =

Single by Sara Evans

from the album Slow Me Down
- Released: September 29, 2014
- Recorded: 2013
- Genre: Country pop
- Length: 3:16
- Label: RCA Nashville
- Songwriter(s): Nathan Chapman, Andrew Dorff, Liz Huett
- Producer(s): Mark Bright, Sara Evans

Sara Evans singles chronology
"Slow Me Down" (2013)	"Put My Heart Down" (2014)	"Marquee Sign" (2017)

Music video
- "Put My Heart Down" on YouTube

"Put My Heart Down" is a song written by Nathan Chapman, Andrew Dorff, and Liz Huett and recorded by American country music artist Sara Evans. It was released in September 2014 as the second and final single from Evans' 2014 album Slow Me Down. Originally, "Can't Stop Loving You" (a duet with Isaac Slade of The Fray) was announced as the second single with a release date of July 21, 2014. However, this release was later cancelled for unknown reasons, and "Put My Heart Down" was released instead.

Evans appeared on ABC's Nashville to perform a duet version of "Put My Heart Down" with Will Chase (who plays Luke Wheeler on the show) on October 29, 2014.

== Content ==
"Put My Heart Down" is a mid-tempo country song. The song is sung from the perspective of a woman who is in a toxic relationship telling her lover to leave because she's done trying to make it work. She acknowledges that it won't be easy and that it already hurts, but it's the right thing for him to do, so she insists he "put [her] heart down and walk away."

Evans said of the song that "this is one of those songs that gets stuck in your head and tickles your ears. [The character in the song is] saying, 'I have a feeling you're going to hurt me, but don't. Just be honest with me and tell me if you’re going to break my heart ('put my heart down') because I'm falling for you.'"

== Music video ==
The music video, directed by Peter Zavadil, was shot at the Riverwood Mansion in East Nashville on October 8, 2014, and made its premiere on Rolling Stone on November 25, 2014. In it, Evans is seen sitting on a couch inside a mansion surrounded by strings of lightbulbs both scattered on the floor and suspended from the ceiling. The singer said the reason for the lights is "to symbolize the light going off in her head. It's her being smart and realizing exactly what the relationship is. It's not that she has 100 percent courage to do this. [She's saying], 'I'll walk away, and you walk away… but you first. Don’t pursue me, because it's going to be hard for me to resist you.'"

== Chart performance ==
"Put My Heart Down" debuted at number 60 on the U.S. Billboard Country Airplay chart for the week of November 8, 2014, and ultimately reached a peak of number 57, only spending four weeks on the chart.

Chart (2014)	Peak position
US Country Airplay (Billboard)	57
