= Mary Was the Marrying Kind =

Single by Kip Moore

from the album Up All Night
- Released: March 14, 2011
- Recorded: 2011
- Genre: Country
- Length: 3:36
- Label: MCA Nashville
- Songwriters: Kip Moore; Dan Couch; Scott Stepakoff
- Producer: Brett James

Kip Moore singles chronology
"Mary Was the Marrying Kind" (2011)	"Somethin' 'Bout a Truck" (2011)

"Mary Was the Marrying Kind" is a song recorded by American country music artist Kip Moore, co-written by Dan Couch and Scott Stepakoff, released as the lead single from his debut album Up All Night. The song, which was released as Moore's debut single in March 2011, was the fourth most added country single at the time of its release and peaked at number 45 on Hot Country Songs. The song did not make the final cut of Moore's debut album Up All Night, although it was included as a bonus track on the deluxe edition.

== Content ==
The song talks about women that Moore has dated and the reasons that the women were wrong for him. He then goes on to talk about Mary, a woman that Moore hadn’t seen in about over five years since leaving high school. Moore described Mary as the tall, shy, meek, sweet, nice woman that no one paid any attention to until she grew comfortable with herself and guys took notice. Moore happened to run into her at a party, stating that she was "gorgeous, funny, charming and witty". Moore goes on to state that the song describes "[missing] out on something special because you weren’t paying attention".

== Critical reception ==
While Karlie Justus of Engine 145 praised the lyrics of the song, Justus criticized the "heavy-handed production" involved. She described the song as an "adventurous first go at country radio that demands attention, both for its string of intertwined stories and for Moore’s insistent delivery [that] paints vivid pictures with unique details about a believable range of women, before honing [sic] in on the one that got away". Justus also said that "the range present in the lyrics is missing from Moore’s performance" and "he blows out every corner of the song’s chorus with an intensity that, when coupled with its heavy-handed production, feels sloppy and reaching compared to its effortless, stream-of-consciousness verses." Kyle Ward of Roughstock gave it 4.5 stars out of 5, saying that "Moore gives an impassioned vocal performance, particularly on the chorus. It’s a tad overproduced, but by 2011 standards is far from gluttonous." In 2017, Billboard contributor Chuck Dauphin put "Mary Was the Marrying Kind" at number nine on his top 10 list of Moore's best songs.

== Chart performance ==
Chart (2011)	Peak position
US Hot Country Songs (Billboard)	45
