= I'm to Blame =

Single by Kip Moore

from the album Wild Ones
- Released: February 2, 2015
- Recorded: 2015
- Genre: Country
- Length: 2:17
- Label: MCA Nashville
- Songwriters: Kip Moore; Justin Weaver; Westin Davis
- Producer: Brett James

Kip Moore singles chronology
"Dirt Road" (2014)	"I'm to Blame" (2015)	"Running for You" (2015)

Music video
- "I'm to Blame" on YouTube

"I'm to Blame" is a song co-written and recorded by American country music artist Kip Moore. It was released to radio on February 2, 2015 as the lead single from his second studio album Wild Ones (2015). Written by Moore, Justin Weaver, and Westin Davis, the song is about a man admitting to past mistakes he made in his life. "I'm to Blame" peaked at numbers 20 and 24 on both the Billboard Country Airplay and Hot Country Songs charts respectively. It also charted at number 100 on the Hot 100 for one week. The song was certified Gold by the Recording Industry Association of America (RIAA), and has sold 156,000 units as of September 2015. It achieved similar chart prominence in Canada, reaching number 40 on the Canada Country chart and number 96 on the Canadian Hot 100. An accompanying music video for the single, directed by Peter Zavadil, features Moore crashing a wedding to rescue the bride.

== Content ==
"I'm to Blame" was written by Moore, Justin Weaver, and Westin Davis. It was described as a "mini-biography" that has Moore admitting to the mistakes he's made in the past.

== Critical reception ==
Giving it a B+, Jon Freeman of Country Weekly wrote that "Kip's predominantly electric guitar-driven sound…is still intact, but this time the snare drum cracks like a pistol and there's a banjo plinky-plinking for possibly the first time ever in one of his songs. If there's a downside to this one, it's that the 2:16 run time cuts the tune short right as it's really hitting its stride." In 2017, Billboard contributor Chuck Dauphin put "I'm to Blame" at number six on his top 10 list of Moore's best songs.

== Music video ==
The music video was directed by Peter Zavadil and premiered in April 2015. The video starts with two suited men in a bar, with the groom saying he's marrying a woman whose family is rich. It cuts to the day of the wedding where Moore and his band are dressed in powder blue tuxedos ready to crash the ceremony. After entering the building, Moore and his band remove the tuxedos and perform the song, rescuing the bride in the process.

== Commercial performance ==
"I'm to Blame" peaked at number 20 on the Country Airplay chart for the week of August 8, 2015, and stayed there for 33 weeks. On the week of September 12, it peaked at number 24 on the Hot Country Songs chart, and remained there for 30 weeks. That same week, it debuted at number 100 on the Billboard Hot 100, but left the next week. It was certified gold by the RIAA in the US on June 3, 2021. The song has sold 156,000 copies in the US as of September 2015. In Canada, the track debuted and peaked at number 96 on the Canadian Hot 100 for the week of February 21. It also debuted at number 50 on the Canada Country chart for the week of August 22, and peaked at number 40 the week of September 19, staying on the chart for eight weeks.

== Charts and certifications ==
=== Weekly charts ===
Weekly chart performance for "I'm to Blame"
Chart (2015)	Peak position
Canada (Canadian Hot 100)	96
Canada Country (Billboard)	40
US Billboard Hot 100	100
US Country Airplay (Billboard)	20
US Hot Country Songs (Billboard)	24

=== Year-end charts ===
2015 year-end chart performance for "I'm to Blame"
Chart (2015)	Position
US Country Airplay (Billboard)	65
US Hot Country Songs (Billboard)	65

=== Certifications ===
Certifications for "I'm to Blame"
Region	Certification	Certified units/sales
United States (RIAA)	Gold	156,000
