= Young Love (Kip Moore song) =

Single by Kip Moore
- Released: November 25, 2013
- Recorded: 2013
- Genre: Country
- Length: 4:38
- Label: MCA Nashville
- Songwriters: Kip Moore; Dan Couch; Westin Davis
- Producer: Brett James

Kip Moore singles chronology
"Hey Pretty Girl" (2013)	"Young Love" (2013)	"Dirt Road" (2014)

"Young Love" is a song recorded by American country music artist Kip Moore. It was released in November 2013. Moore wrote the song with Dan Couch and Westin Davis. The song along with his next single "Dirt Road" were projected to be on his sophomore studio album, but were scrapped when the two songs stalled at radio.

== Critical reception ==
The song received a favorable review from Taste of Country, which said that Moore "proves his sharp storytelling is the rule, not the exception." The review also stated that "Moore’s husky voice is comfortable with a love song, yet some sort of hurt or regret seems to soak into this interpretation." Matt Bjorke of Roughstock gave the song four stars out of five, writing that "this story has been told before but it's told here in a new, interesting, and most importantly, very Kip Moore way." Bjorke called Moore's voice "as raspy and as inviting musically as ever," adding that "the production from Brett James is as solid as everything on Up All Night and helps accentuate the lyrics to the track."

== Music video ==
The music video was directed by Peter Zavadil and premiered in January 2014.

== Chart performance ==
"Young Love" debuted at number 51 on the U.S. Billboard Country Airplay chart for the week of December 7, 2013. It also debuted at number 35 on the U.S. Billboard Hot Country Songs chart for the week of December 14, 2013. It also debuted at number 83 on the Canadian Hot 100 chart for the week of December 14, 2013. It also debuted at number 22 on the U.S. Billboard Bubbling Under Hot 100 Singles chart for the week of January 25, 2014. The song has sold 118,000 copies in the U.S. as of February 2014.

Chart (2013–2014)	Peak position
Canada Hot 100 (Billboard)	83
Canada Country (Billboard)	43
US Bubbling Under Hot 100 (Billboard)	4
US Country Airplay (Billboard)	22
US Hot Country Songs (Billboard)	26

=== Year-end charts ===
Chart (2014)	Position
US Country Airplay (Billboard)	85
US Hot Country Songs (Billboard)	83
