= More Girls Like You =

Single by Kip Moore

from the album Slowheart
- Released: February 10, 2017
- Recorded: 2015
- Genre: Country
- Length: 2:34
- Label: MCA Nashville
- Songwriter(s): Kip Moore; Steven Lee Olsen; Josh Miller; David Garcia
- Producer(s): Kip Moore; David Garcia

Kip Moore singles chronology
| "Running for You" (2015) | "More Girls Like You" (2017) | "Last Shot" (2017) |

"More Girls Like You" is a song co-written and recorded by American country music artist Kip Moore, released digitally on February 10, 2017, and to radio on February 21, 2017. It serves as the lead single to his third studio album Slowheart. The song was written by Moore, Steven Lee Olsen, Josh Miller and David Garcia.

== Content ==
Rolling Stone described the song by saying, "Saddling romance and a bit of faith to an easy gallop of a rhythm, Kip Moore sings of domestic bliss." The song is about a man praising a woman with a "settling presence."

== Commercial performance ==
"More Girls Like You" peaked at number four on the Billboard Country Airplay chart for the week ending October 27, 2017, making it Moore's fourth top ten single and his first since "Hey Pretty Girl", in 2013. The song has sold 122,000 copies in the United States as of October 2017.

== Charts ==
| Chart (2017) | Peak position |
|---|---|
| Canada Country (Billboard) | 3 |
| US Billboard Hot 100 | 66 |
| US Country Airplay (Billboard) | 4 |
| US Hot Country Songs (Billboard) | 8 |

=== Year-end charts ===
| Chart (2017) | Position |
|---|---|
| Canada Country (Billboard) | 14 |
| US Country Airplay (Billboard) | 19 |
| US Hot Country Songs (Billboard) | 28 |

== Certifications ==
| Region | Certification | Certified units/sales |
|---|---|---|
| Canada (Music Canada) | Gold | 40,000^{‡} |
| United States (RIAA) | Gold | 500,000^{‡} |
^{‡} Sales+streaming figures based on certification alone.
