= Dirt Road =

Single by Kip Moore
- Released: April 15, 2014
- Recorded: 2013–14
- Genre: Country rock
- Length: 3:23
- Label: MCA Nashville
- Songwriters: Dan Couch; Weston Davis; Kip Moore
- Producer: Brett James

Kip Moore singles chronology
"Young Love" (2013)	"Dirt Road" (2014)	"I'm to Blame" (2015)

"Dirt Road" is a song co-written and recorded by American country music artist Kip Moore. It was released to radio on April 15, 2014. Moore wrote the song with Dan Couch and Weston Davis. The song along with his previous single "Young Love" were projected to be on his sophomore studio album, but were scrapped when the two songs stalled at radio.

== Critical reception ==
An uncredited Taste of Country review stated that "Kip Moore is right when he says his new single ‘Dirt Road’ will raise a few eyebrows, it may just take awhile. Lyrically the new song is country's Mariana Trench hiding behind familiar references to beer, moonlight and backseat romance."

== Music video ==
The music video was directed by Peter Zavadil and premiered in July 2014.

== Chart performance ==
Chart (2014)	Peak position
US Country Airplay (Billboard)	44
US Hot Country Songs (Billboard)	35
