= She's Mine (Kip Moore song) =

2019 song by Kip Moore

Single by Kip Moore

from the album Wild World
- Released: August 9, 2019
- Genre: Country rock
- Length: 3:49
- Label: MCA Nashville
- Songwriters: Kip Moore; Dan Couch; Scott Stepakoff
- Producer: Kip Moore

Kip Moore singles chronology
| "The Bull" (2019) | "She's Mine" (2019) | "Good Life" (2021) |

Music video
- "She's Mine" on YouTube

"She's Mine" is a song recorded by American country music singer Kip Moore. It is the first single to his fourth studio album Wild World. The song was written by Moore, along with Dan Couch and Scott Stepakoff.

== Background ==
Moore said: “I wrote this song at a time in my life when I realized that my life was flipped upside down and I didn’t know which way was up.” “Every experience from there forward, I felt like everything was going to be a surprise. I didn't know where I was going to end up, who I was going to meet or who I was going to be with. I’m fired up to be getting new music out there, and this song is just the beginning. I know the fans are ready and so am I.”

== Music video ==
The Music video was uploaded on September 12, 2019, directed by PJ Brown. Moore looking for love in all the fun places, and finds himself interacting with a wide range of women including a cheerleader, hippie, rockstar.

== Charts ==
=== Weekly charts ===
| Chart (2019–2020) | Peak position |
|---|---|
| Canada Country (Billboard) | 41 |
| US Bubbling Under Hot 100 (Billboard) | 13 |
| US Country Airplay (Billboard) | 17 |
| US Hot Country Songs (Billboard) | 24 |

=== Year-end charts ===
| Chart (2020) | Position |
|---|---|
| US Country Airplay (Billboard) | 55 |
| US Hot Country Songs (Billboard) | 56 |

== Certifications ==
| Region | Certification | Certified units/sales |
|---|---|---|
| Canada (Music Canada) | Gold | 40,000^{‡} |
| United States (RIAA) | Gold | 500,000^{‡} |
^{‡} Sales+streaming figures based on certification alone.
