= Peter Zavadil =

American music video director

Peter Zavadil is an American music video director who works primarily in the field of country music. He has directed many music videos since the late 1990s. He has won the Country Music Association Award for Video of the Year twice from seven nominations, first in 2001 for "Born to Fly" by Sara Evans and again in 2002 for Brad Paisley's "I'm Gonna Miss Her".

== Music videos directed ==
176 music videos are currently listed here.

Year	Video	Artist
1997	"Warning Signs"	Bill Engvall with John Michael Montgomery
1998	"I Do (Cherish You)"	Mark Wills
1998	"Totally Committed"	Jeff Foxworthy
1998	"Texas"	Charlie Daniels with Ray Benson and Lee Roy Parnell
1998	"You're Gone"	Diamond Rio
1998	"I'm a Cowboy"	Bill Engvall
1998	"Take Me"	Lari White
1998	"Under the Hood"	Billy Ray Cyrus
1998	"Here's Your Sign Christmas"	Bill Engvall
1999	"Hollywood Indian Guides"	Bill Engvall
1999	"You're Still Beautiful to Me"	Bryan White
1999	"She Won't Be Lonely Long"	Lee Roy Parnell
1999	"Don't Lie"	Trace Adkins
1999	"How Big 'a Boy Are Ya?"	Roy D. Mercer with Charlie Daniels
2000	"Searching for the Missing Peace"	Marty Raybon
2000	"Now That's Awesome"	Bill Engvall
2000	"Born to Fly"	Sara Evans
2000	"Pour Me"	Trick Pony
2001	"Burn Down the Trailer Park"	Billy Ray Cyrus
2001	"Jolene"	Sherrié Austin
2001	"I Could Not Ask for More"	Sara Evans
2001	"Out of Here Tonight"	The Great Divide
2001	"Where the Blacktop Ends"	Keith Urban
2001	"On a Night like This"	Trick Pony
2001	"Ain't Nobody Gonna Take That from Me"	Collin Raye
2001	"Saints & Angels"	Sara Evans
2002	"I'm Gonna Miss Her (The Fishin' Song)"	Brad Paisley
2002	"Breath" (with Cledus T. Judd)	Cledus T. Judd
2002	"That's Just Jessie"	Kevin Denney
2002	"Just What I Do"	Trick Pony
2002	"Ol' Red"	Blake Shelton
2002	"Life Happened"	Tammy Cochran
2002	"It's a Great Day to Be a Guy" (with Cledus T. Judd)	Cledus T. Judd
2002	"Southern Boy"	Charlie Daniels with Travis Tritt
2002	"The Baby"	Blake Shelton
2003	"Celebrity"	Brad Paisley
2003	"What Was I Thinkin'"	Dierks Bentley
2003	"In My Dreams"	Rick Trevino
2003	"Chicks Dig It"	Chris Cagle
2003	"And the Crowd Goes Wild"	Mark Wills
2003	"My Last Name"	Dierks Bentley
2003	"Cool to Be a Fool"	Joe Nichols
2004	"Just One of the Boys"	Michelle Poe
2004	"Suds in the Bucket"	Sara Evans
2004	"How Am I Doin'"	Dierks Bentley
2004	"I Meant To"	Brad Cotter
2004	"The Bride"	Trick Pony
2004	"Some Beach"	Blake Shelton
2004	"No End in Sight"	Katrina Elam
2004	"Baby Girl"	Sugarland
2004	"Paper Angels"	Jimmy Wayne
2004	"Let Them Be Little" (director: Eric Welch)	Billy Dean
2005	"What's a Guy Gotta Do"	Joe Nichols
2005	"Goodbye Time"	Blake Shelton
2005	"My Give a Damn's Busted"	Jo Dee Messina
2005	"I'll Try Anything"	Amber Dotson
2005	"Help Somebody"	Van Zant
2005	"Stick Around"	Reckless Kelly
2005	"Dream Big"	Ryan Shupe & the RubberBand
2005	"A Real Fine Place to Start"	Sara Evans
2005	"Redneck Yacht Club"	Craig Morgan
2005	"No One'll Ever Love Me"	Rebecca Lynn Howard
2005	"Delicious Surprise (I Believe It)"	Jo Dee Messina
2005	"Angels"	Randy Travis
2005	"Nobody but Me"	Blake Shelton
2005	"Swinging Door"	Joey Daniels
2005	"You're Gonna Be (Always Loved by Me)"	Reba McEntire
2005	"Cheatin'"	Sara Evans
2005	"I Can't Unlove You"	Kenny Rogers
2006	"Banjo Boy"	Ryan Shupe & the RubberBand
2006	"Men & Mascara"	Julie Roberts
2006	"Things I Miss the Most"	Van Zant
2006	"Two Pink Lines"	Eric Church
2006	"It's Too Late to Worry"	Jo Dee Messina
2006	"You Don't Know a Thing"	Steve Azar
2006	"The Reason Why"	Vince Gill
2006	"The Last Ten Years (Superman)"	Kenny Rogers
2006	"Your Touch"	The Black Keys
2006	"I Still Do"	Reckless Kelly
2007	"Separate Ways"	Rick Trevino
2007	"Tough"	Craig Morgan
2007	"Just Got To Be"	The Black Keys
2007	"This Is My Life"	Phil Vassar
2007	"Firecracker"	Josh Turner
2008	"Love Is a Beautiful Thing"	Phil Vassar
2008	"The Cheapest Key"	Kathleen Edwards
2008	"You're Gonna Miss This"	Trace Adkins
2008	"I Do"	Jewel
2008	"Cheater, Cheater"	Joey + Rory
2008	"Ragged as the Road"	Reckless Kelly
2008	"Till It Feels Like Cheating"	Jewel
2008	"Feel That Fire"	Dierks Bentley
2009	"Play the Song"	Joey + Rory
2009	"Simple Life"	Lynyrd Skynyrd
2009	"Gimmie That Girl"	Joe Nichols
2010	"Stay Here Forever"	Jewel
2010	"Look Who's Back in Love"	Jonathan Singleton & the Grove
2010	"Satisfied"	Jewel
2010	"Smoke a Little Smoke"	Eric Church
2010	"A Little Bit Stronger"	Sara Evans
2010	"Ten"	Jewel
2010	"I Wouldn't Be a Man"	Josh Turner
2010	"Pants"	Walker Hayes
2010	"Last Night Again"	Steel Magnolia
2011	"If I Were a Boy"	Reba McEntire
2011	"If Heaven Wasn't So Far Away"	Justin Moore
2011	"Homeboy"	Eric Church
2011	"Barefoot Blue Jean Night"	Jake Owen
2011	"Easy"	Rascal Flatts with Natasha Bedingfield
2011	"My Heart Can't Tell You No"	Sara Evans
2011	"Drink in My Hand"	Eric Church
2011	"Everything and All"	Randy Travis
2012	"Time Is Love"	Josh Turner
2012	"Springsteen"	Eric Church
2012	"Cowboys and Angels"	Dustin Lynch
2012	"Something to Do with My Hands"	Thomas Rhett
2012	"Too Good to Be True"	Edens Edge
2012	"Til My Last Day"	Justin Moore
2012	"When It Pleases You"	Sara Watkins
2012	"Creepin'"	Eric Church
2012	"Beer Money"	Kip Moore
2012	"Beer with Jesus"	Thomas Rhett
2013	"Find Me a Baby"	Josh Turner
2013	"Downtown"	Lady Antebellum
2013	"Over When It's Over"	Eric Church
2013	"Point at You"	Justin Moore
2013	"Goodbye Town"	Lady Antebellum
2013	"Round Here"	Florida Georgia Line
2013	"Stay"	Florida Georgia Line
2013	"Slow Me Down"	Sara Evans
2013	"Lettin' the Night Roll"	Justin Moore
2013	"Compass"	Lady Antebellum
2014	"Give Me Back My Hometown"	Eric Church
2014	"Young Love"	Kip Moore
2014	"A Man Who Was Gonna Die Young"	Eric Church
2014	"Dust"	Eli Young Band
2014	"Dirt Road"	Kip Moore
2014	"Rum"	Brothers Osborne
2014	"Cold One"	Eric Church
2014	"Hope You Get Lonely Tonight"	Cole Swindell
2014	"Put My Heart Down"	Sara Evans
2014	"Talladega"	Eric Church
2015	"Better Than You Left Me"	Mickey Guyton
2015	"Smoke"	A Thousand Horses
2015	"Don't It"	Billy Currington
2015	"I'm to Blame"	Kip Moore
2015	"(This Ain't No) Drunk Dial"	A Thousand Horses
2015	"Southern Style"	Darius Rucker
2015	"Stay a Little Longer"	Brothers Osborne
2015	"Ain't No Trucks in Texas"	Ronnie Dunn
2015	"Are You Ready for the Country?"	Hank Williams, Jr. with Eric Church
2016	"Roots"	Parmalee
2016	"Long Live Tonight"	LANco
2016	"Float Your Boat"	Ryan Follese
2016	"Saltwater Gospel"	Eli Young Band
2016	"Everywhere"	Mo Pitney
2016	"Jesus and Jones"	Trace Adkins
2017
2017	"Marquee Sign"	Sara Evans
2017	"Waiting on You"	Lindsay Ell
2017	"Losing Sleep"	Chris Young
2017	"Mess Outta Me"	JB and the Moonshine Band
2017	"Kiss Somebody"	Morgan Evans
2018	"Beautiful Crazy"	Luke Combs
2018	"Loud"	Tim Hicks
2018	"Criminal"	Lindsay Ell
2018	"The Bad Guy"	Meghan Patrick
2018	"Whiskey Glasses"	Morgan Wallen
2018	"Night Shift"	Jon Pardi
2018	"Got My Name Changed Back"	Pistol Annies
2019	"Raised on Country"	Chris Young
2019	"Rival"	LANco
2019	"Buy My Own Drinks"	Runaway June
2020	"This Is Us"	Jimmie Allen with Noah Cyrus
2020	"My Boy"	Elvie Shane
2021	"Famous Friends"	Chris Young with Kane Brown
2021	"Soul"	Lee Brice
2021	"Where Have You Gone"	Alan Jackson
