= Somethin' 'Bout a Truck =

Single by Kip Moore

from the album Up All Night
- Released: September 26, 2011
- Recorded: 2011
- Genre: Country; country rock
- Length: 3:36; 2:49 (video edit)
- Label: MCA Nashville
- Songwriters: Kip Moore; Dan Couch
- Producer: Brett James

Kip Moore singles chronology
"Mary Was the Marrying Kind" (2011)	"Somethin' 'Bout a Truck" (2011)	"Beer Money" (2012)

"Somethin' 'Bout a Truck" is a song co-written and recorded by American country music artist Kip Moore. It was released in September 2011 as the second single from his debut album Up All Night. Moore wrote this song with and Dan Couch. It garnered positive reviews from critics who praised Moore's delivery for being able to elevate generic lyrics. "Somethin' 'Bout a Truck" reached number one on the Billboard Hot Country Songs chart, the only single in Moore's career to reach that peak to date. It also gave him his first and only top 40 hit on the Billboard Hot 100, peaking at number 29. The song was certified 2× Platinum by the Recording Industry Association of America (RIAA), denoting sales of over two million units in the country. It also charted in Canada, peaking at number 33 on the Canadian Hot 100. Two accompanying music videos were made for the single, the official version by Roger Pistole and an acoustic version by Stephen Shepherd.

== Content ==
Moore discussed the album in an interview with American Songwriter. He stated, "I made a conscious effort on this record to try to capture the youthful spirit that we all have inside of us. So often people as they get older they feel like things have to change inside their spirit. We all have to mature and take on different responsibilities. I tried to really capture...that you don’t have to let your soul die or spirit die. You can still keep that youthful way and still live that way."

The song is in a moderate tempo in the key of B major. Its accompaniment is open fifths instead of chords, in a pattern of B5-E5-B5-F♯5-B5.

== Critical reception ==
Billy Dukes of Taste of Country gave the song three stars out of five, saying that "vocally, he's not a perfect match for this style, but he's able to overcome somewhat cliche lyrics to create a memorable single." Kevin John Coyne of Country Universe gave the song a B+ grade, writing that Moore "sounds like he's reveling in the pleasures that await him at the end of the week after forty hours at the factory," calling it "a welcome change from those who sound like high schoolers who hit up that back country road on their way home from the mall." In 2017, Billboard contributor Chuck Dauphin put "Somethin' 'Bout a Truck" at number three on his top 10 list of Moore's best songs.

== Music video ==
The music video was directed by Roger Pistole and premiered in October 2011. An acoustic music video was directed by Stephen Shepherd and premiered in June 2012.

== Chart performance ==
"Somethin' 'Bout a Truck" debuted at number 51 on the U.S. Billboard Hot Country Songs chart for the week of October 22, 2011. It also debuted at number 89 on the U.S. Billboard Hot 100 chart for the week of February 25, 2012. It also debuted at number 97 on Canadian Hot 100 chart for the week of April 14, 2012.

Chart (2011–2012)	Peak position
Canada Hot 100 (Billboard)	33
US Billboard Hot 100	29
US Hot Country Songs (Billboard)	1

=== Year-end charts ===
Chart (2012)	Position
US Billboard Hot 100	96
US Country Songs (Billboard)	12

== Certifications ==
Region	Certification	Certified units/sales
Australia (ARIA)	Platinum	70,000^{‡}
United States (RIAA)	3× Platinum	3,000,000^{‡}
^{‡} Sales+streaming figures based on certification alone.
