= Hey Pretty Girl =

Single by Kip Moore

from the album Up All Night
- Released: January 28, 2013
- Recorded: 2012
- Genre: Country
- Length: 3:36
- Label: MCA Nashville
- Songwriters: Kip Moore; Dan Couch
- Producer: Brett James

Kip Moore singles chronology
"Beer Money" (2012)	"Hey Pretty Girl" (2013)	"Young Love" (2013)

"Hey Pretty Girl" is a song recorded by American country music artist Kip Moore. It was released in January 2013 as the fourth and final single from his debut album, Up All Night. Moore co-wrote the song with Dan Couch. As of June 19, 2013, the single had sold 500,000 copies in the United States and been certified Gold by the RIAA.

== Content ==
The song is in the key of D major. It tells a story of a man pursuing a woman, dancing with her, then marrying and having a child with her.

== Critical reception ==
Billy Dukes of Taste of Country gave the song five stars out of five, writing that "the singer employs no studio tricks to make his point. He brings you in with a performance as intimate as any you’ll hear this year." Chuck Dauphin of Roughstock gave the song a favorable review, saying that "Kip Moore gets a chance to showcase his vocals for the first time on his new single, rather than just dealing with cute hooks for radio play." In 2017, Dauphin, writing for Billboard, put "Hey Pretty Girl" at number five on his top 10 list of Moore's best songs.

== Music video ==
An acoustic music video, directed by Stephen Shepherd, premiered in April 2012. The official music video, directed by Chris Hicky, premiered in March 2013.

== Chart performance ==
"Hey Pretty Girl" debuted at number 60 on the U.S. Billboard Country Airplay chart for the week of January 19, 2013. It debuted at number 46 on the U.S. Billboard Hot Country Songs chart for the week of February 16, 2013. It debuted at number 97 on the U.S. Billboard Hot 100 chart for the week of April 6, 2013. It debuted at number 98 on the Canadian Hot 100 chart for the week of July 13, 2013.

Chart (2013)	Peak position
Canada Hot 100 (Billboard)	62
Canada Country (Billboard)	6
US Billboard Hot 100	41
US Country Airplay (Billboard)	2
US Hot Country Songs (Billboard)	8

=== Year-end charts ===
Chart (2013)	Position
US Country Airplay (Billboard)	8
US Hot Country Songs (Billboard)	23

== Certifications ==
Region	Certification	Certified units/sales
Canada (Music Canada)	Gold	40,000^{*}
United States (RIAA)	Platinum	687,000
^{*} Sales figures based on certification alone.
