= Up All Night (Kip Moore album) =

Studio album by Kip Moore
- Released: April 24, 2012
- Studio: Ocean Way, Nashville; Blackbird, Nashville; The Boarding House, Nashville; The Laundry Room, Nashville
- Genre: Country
- Length: 45:35
- Label: MCA Nashville
- Producer: Brett James

Kip Moore chronology
Up All Night (2012)	Wild Ones (2015)

Singles from Up All Night
- 1. "Mary Was the Marrying Kind" Released: March 14, 2011; 2. "Somethin' 'Bout a Truck" Released: September 26, 2011; 3. "Beer Money" Released: July 9, 2012; 4. "Hey Pretty Girl" Released: January 28, 2013; 5. "Crazy One More Time" Released: January 24, 2022

Up All Night is the debut studio album by American country music artist Kip Moore. It was released on April 24, 2012, by MCA Nashville. The album includes the number one single, "Somethin' 'Bout a Truck". In 2017, the album was certified Platinum in the US by the Recording Industry Association of America (RIAA).

== Critical reception ==
Professional ratings
Aggregate scores
Source	Rating
Metacritic	67/100
Review scores
Source	Rating
AllMusic	3/5 stars
Billboard	3.5/5 stars
PopMatters	6/10 stars
Roughstock	favorable
Taste of Country	4/5 stars
USA Today	2.5/4 stars

Up All Night received generally positive reception from music critics. Metacritic assigns a "weighted average" metascore to albums based upon the reviews and ratings of selected independent reviewers, and the album score is a 67, which means it received "generally favorable" reviews. Stephen Thomas Erlewine of AllMusic gave it three stars, saying that it is "shameless in its attempt to win you over, and […] that eager-to-please nature winds up ingratiating whether you like it or not." Bobby Peacock of Roughstock praised Moore's voice and the production, saying that Moore "touches on so many country cornerstones […] in a believable fashion." A positive review also came from the Great American Country writer Daryl Addison, who said that it "carries a unique sound that fits somewhere between ramblin’ man storytelling, hook-driven contemporary country and atmospheric blue-collar rock." Country Standard Time's Michael Rampa was less favorable, criticizing the themes of some songs for "paying women with alcohol".

At Country Weekly, Jessica Nicholson gave a positive review of the album, remarking that "Kip's grainy, warm and confident vocal delivery ties the tales together into a believable tapestry. Brian Mansfield of USA Today rated the album two-and-a-half stars, observing that "Moore's blue-collar grit is welcome, but only on Reckless (Still Growin' Up) does he approach his heroes." Billboard rated the album a 3.5 out of 5, stating, "Moore spends much of his debut album, Up All Night, outlining the pleasures to be had from hot women and cold beverages." Taste of Country's Billy Dukes rated the album four stars, writing, "Like Eric Church before him, this singer may struggle to find consistent mainstream success, but it’s not because of a lack of high-quality material." At PopMatters, Dave Heaton rated the album six out of ten discs, saying, "It’s still generic, but takes a somewhat different turn, which is true for the entire LP."

In 2017, Billboard contributor Chuck Dauphin placed four tracks from the album on his top 10 list of Moore's best songs: "Beer Money" at number one, "Somethin' 'Bout a Truck" at number three, "Hey Pretty Girl" at number five and "Faith When I Fall" at number ten.

== Track listing ==
No.	Title	Writer(s)	Length
1.	"Drive Me Crazy"	Kip Moore; Keifer Thompson	4:05
2.	"Beer Money"	Moore; Blair Daly; Troy Verges	3:38
3.	"Somethin' 'Bout a Truck"	Moore; Dan Couch	3:34
4.	"Everything but You"	Moore; Trent Summar	3:56
5.	"Crazy One More Time"	Moore; Aimee Mayo; Chris Lindsey	4:25
6.	"Where You Are Tonight"	Moore; Daly; Verges	4:16
7.	"Hey Pretty Girl"	Moore; Couch	3:36
8.	"Reckless (Still Growin' Up)"	Moore; Couch	4:37
9.	"Up All Night"	Moore; Brett James	4:28
10.	"Fly Again"	Moore; Dave Lapsley; Couch	4:18
11.	"Faith When I Fall"	Moore; James	4:42

Deluxe Edition
No.	Title	Writer(s)	Length
12.	"Mary Was the Marrying Kind"	Moore; Couch; Scott Stepakoff	3:36
13.	"Motorcycle"	Moore; James	4:14
14.	"Somethin' 'Bout a Truck" (Acoustic version)	Moore; Couch	3:34

== Personnel ==
Adapted from the Up All Night liner notes.

=== Musicians ===
- Mike Brignardello – bass guitar
- Adam Browder – electric guitar
- Steve Bryant – bass guitar
- Howard Duck – keyboards
- Mike Durham – electric guitar
- Tommy Harden – drums
- Brett James – background vocals
- Charlie Judge – keyboards
- Troy Lancaster – acoustic guitar, electric guitar
- Dave Lapsley – electric guitar
- Rob McNelley – electric guitar
- Kip Moore – acoustic guitar, lead vocals, background vocals
- Mike Rojas – keyboards
- Scotty Sanders —steel guitar
- Scott Williamson – drums

=== Technical ===
- Craig Allen – design
- Drew Bollman – assistant engineer
- Nick Brophy – mixing
- Joe Fisher – A&R
- Ben Fowler – engineer
- Mike "Frog" Griffith – project coordination
- Brett James – engineer, producer
- Nate Lowery – project coordination
- Joe Martino – assistant engineer
- Andrew Mendelson – mastering
- Justin Niebank – engineer
- Stephen Shepherd – photography
- Jessica Wardwell – photography

== Chart performance ==
=== Weekly charts ===
Chart (2012)	Peak position
US Billboard 200	6
US Top Country Albums (Billboard)	3

=== Year-end charts ===
Chart (2012)	Position
US Billboard 200	120
US Top Country Albums (Billboard)	27

Chart (2013)	Position
US Billboard 200	177
US Top Country Albums (Billboard)	35

=== Singles ===
Year	Single	Peak chart positions				
Year	Single	US Country	US Country Airplay	US	CAN Country	CAN
2011	"Mary Was the Marrying Kind"	45	—	—	—	—
2011	"Somethin' 'bout a Truck"	1	—	29	—	33
2012	"Beer Money"	7	3	51	1	58
2013	"Hey Pretty Girl"	8	2	41	6	62
"—" denotes releases that did not chart

== Certifications ==
Region	Certification	Certified units/sales
United States (RIAA)	Platinum	1,000,000^{‡}
^{‡} Sales+streaming figures based on certification alone.
