= Kip Moore =

American singer-songwriter

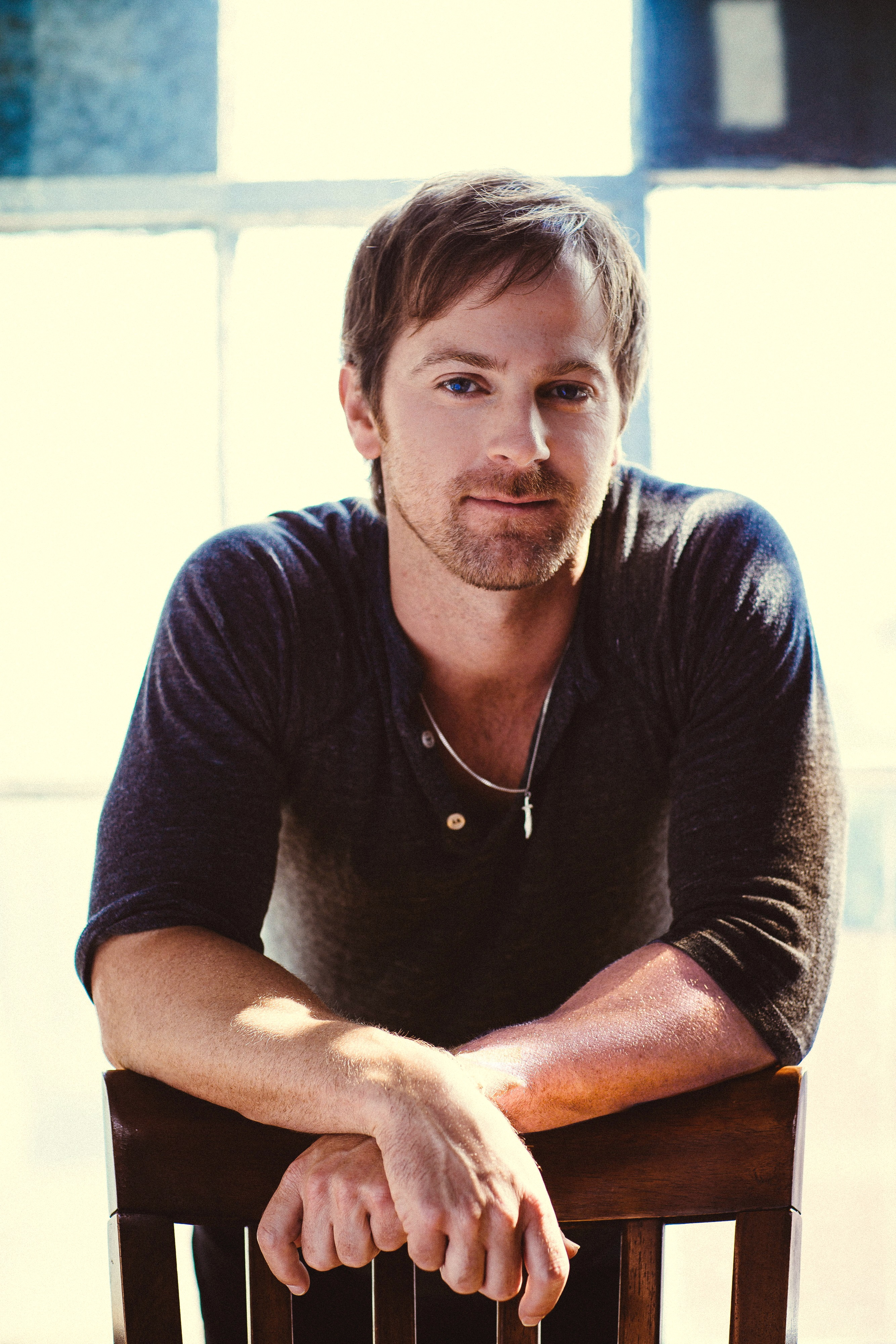
- Moore in 2013

Background information
- Born: Kip Christian Moore; April 1, 1980 (age 46); Tifton, Georgia, U.S.
- Genres: Country; country rock
- Occupations: Singer; songwriter
- Instruments: Vocals; guitar
- Years active: 2008–present
- Labels: MCA Nashville; Virgin
- Website: kipmoore.net

Kip Moore (born April 1, 1980) is an American country music singer and songwriter signed, as of September 2024, to Virgin Music Group. Moore previously recorded for MCA Nashville, where he released five studio albums for the label and charted a total of twelve entries on Billboard Hot Country Songs and Country Airplay, including the number-one "Somethin' 'Bout a Truck" and four additional top-ten hits. He has also written songs for Frankie Ballard, Thompson Square, and James Wesley.

== Early life and education ==
Kip Christian Moore was born on April 1, 1980, in Tifton, Georgia, to Bonnie Moore (née Mann) and Stan Moore. He was raised there, in a family of six children (two brothers and three sisters).

Moore initially began to follow the path of his father, a golf pro; he earned a scholarship in that sport, to Valdosta State University in Georgia. (His father died in September 2011, just months before the release of Moore's debut album.)

Moore is quoted as having said that he "started playing guitar...we when [he] was 17", an event assigned to a period when he was attending Wallace State Community College in Hanceville, Alabama. While at Valdosta State, "music began to exert a greater hold on his life" than his sport; he reportedly made his first public performance at a Mellow Mushroom restaurant in Valdosta, Georgia. During that period he "toured with a band and began to consider a musical future".

== Career ==
Sometime after graduation (see Personal life), Moore moved to Nashville, Tennessee. One report has him there in 2004, with songwriter and producer Brett James helping him to sign a publishing deal. He is also said to have spent eight years in Nashville before signing a record deal, which eventually came with MCA Nashville. His song, "Mary Was the Marrying Kind", debuted at number 58 on Billboard's country singles charts, before peaking at number 45.

On September 27, 2011, he released his second single, "Somethin' 'Bout a Truck". The song was followed by the release of his debut album Up All Night in April 2012. Moore co-wrote every song on the album, and Brett James produced it. A month later, "Somethin' 'Bout a Truck" hit number 1 on the Billboard country charts. "Beer Money" was the album's second single, followed by "Hey Pretty Girl". These songs also reached the country Top 5. Up All Night was the most commercially successful album for a debut country male artist in both 2012 and 2013.

Moore co-wrote two tracks on Thompson Square's self-titled debut album which was released in February 2011: "All the Way" and "Let's Fight", the latter of which was their debut single. He also co-wrote James Wesley's 2012 single "Walking Contradiction". He also co-wrote Frankie Ballard's 2016 single "Cigarette".

=== Wild Ones (2013–2016) ===
In October 2013, Moore announced his fifth single, "Young Love". It charted at number 22 on the Country Airplay in March 2014. After it underperformed, it was followed by "Dirt Road", which failed to make Top 40. Moore then decided to "scrap" his second album and compose new material. Moore then released "I'm to Blame", the lead single to his 2015 album, Wild Ones. In 2016, Kip released his first EP titled Underground, featuring tracks “My Kind” and an acoustic version of “Midnight Slowdance”.

=== Slowheart (2017–2018) ===
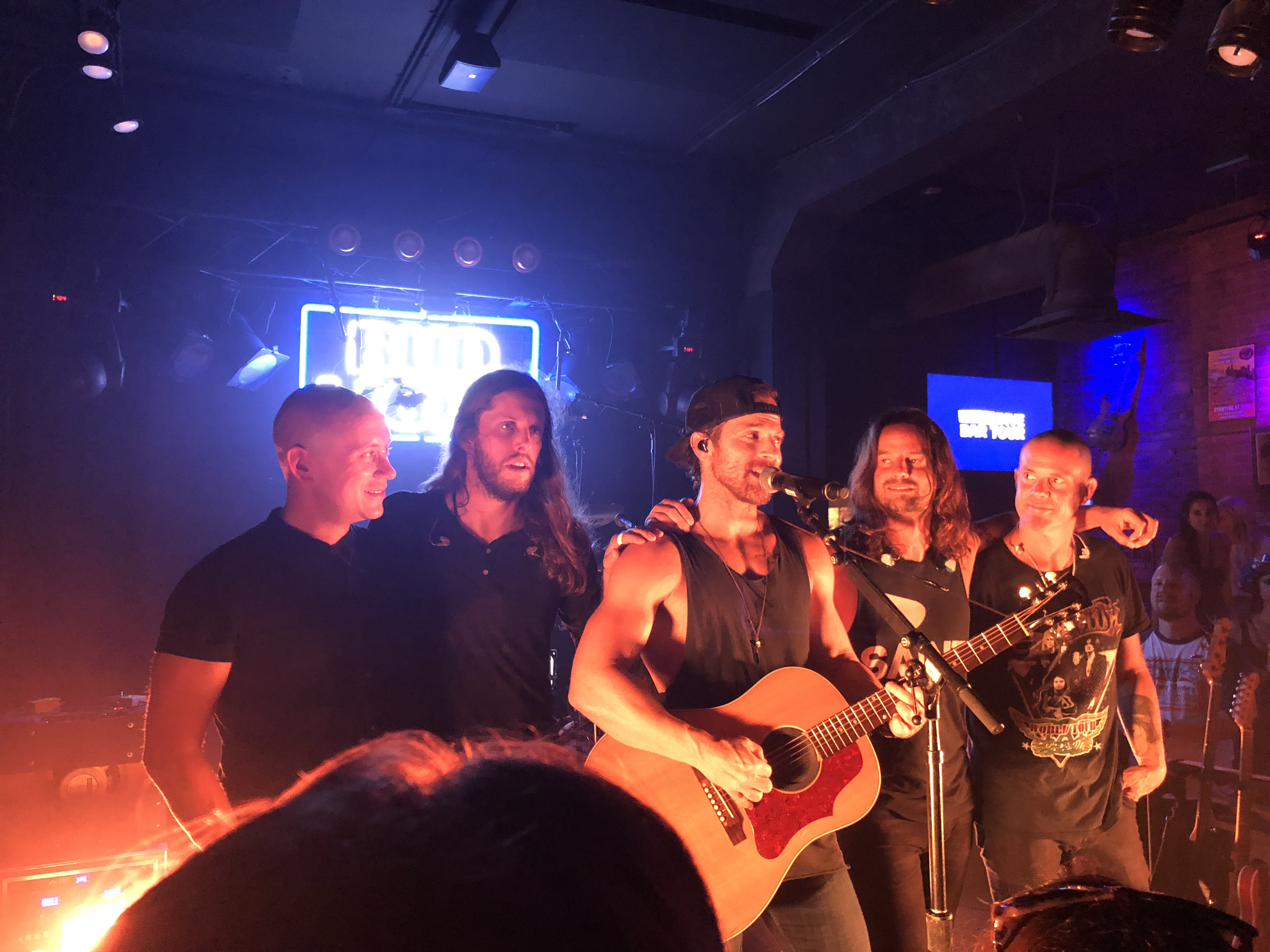
Kip Moore with his band, "The Slowhearts" in 2019.

On February 10, 2017, Moore released "More Girls Like You" as the lead single from a then-unannounced forthcoming album.

On June 21, 2017, Moore announced the album's title, Slowheart, and its release date of September 8, 2017.

On November 16, 2018, Moore released his second EP titled Room to Spare: The Acoustic Sessions. Three singles were released in preparation for the EP: "Tennessee Boy," an acoustic version of "Plead the Fifth," and "It Ain't California." The EP consists of seven acoustic tracks.

=== Wild World (2019–2022) ===
In May 2019, Moore announced on social media "That's a wrap, record #4 is done". No release date had been officially announced, but on June 15 Moore announced he was checking mixes for his upcoming record, indicating the record may be released sometime in 2019.

On August 9, 2019, Moore released a much-anticipated lead single to his yet to be named upcoming album. "She's Mine" is a song Moore wrote over a decade ago, and finally released it in 2019.

On March 27, 2020, Moore released the title track for his anticipated fourth studio album titled Wild World. Later that same day, Moore did an interview with Billboard about his new album. The album, which consists of thirteen tracks (twelve of which are co-written by Moore), was released on May 29, 2020. Another preview song, "Southpaw", followed on April 17, 2020.

In January 2022, Moore released a re-recorded version of "Crazy One More Time", which was previously featured as an album track on Up All Night. The new version was sent to country radio on January 24, 2022.

=== Damn Love (2023) ===
On February 24, 2023, Moore released the first single from his fifth studio album, "Damn Love". The album of the same name was released on April 28, 2023. "Kinda Bar", the album's second single, was released on March 24, 2023.

=== Move to Virgin Music Group ===
On March 17, 2024, Moore announced that he and his longtime label MCA were splitting. At the same, he announced that he was working on his sixth studio album, which he expected to release independently. However, in September 2024, Moore announced that he signed a global deal with Virgin Music Group. For his work in promoting country music around the world through his international tours, Moore was awarded the 2024 International Artist Achievement Award at the 58th Annual CMA Awards.

Moore released his sixth studio album, Solitary Tracks, on February 28, 2025. The album release was preceded by the promotional singles "Live Here To Work", and "Learning As I Go", and by "Flowers in December", "Bad Spot", and "Around You".

== Personal life ==
After college, Moore moved to a "little hut" in Hawaii, where he also took up backpacking and surfing. As of February 2025, Moore resided in South Carolina, dividing his time between there and Maui. Moore also co-manages a business, a lodging facility for outdoor enthusiasts, in Rogers, Kentucky.

Moore founded the charity, One Heartbeat, which aims to solving housing and other economic challenges faced by some families in the wake of rising costs and decreasing affordability."

In his free time, Moore enjoys carpentry, surfing, rock climbing and hiking.

Moore considers himself a private person. "I don't owe anybody anything to tell them about my personal life and that's how I’ve always felt. It's ways of protecting people around me, because the minute I say it, people will pry like crazy." Moore also considers himself to be a spiritual person. "....I have always had a faith about me. There have been times in my life where I’ve had to be really diligent and I’ve taken the time to wake up every morning, read a little bit of scripture, and meditate. That centers me in a different way."

Regarding social media, Moore has admitted that he "loathes" it and feels that he may eventually be "phased out" because he is not creating content aimed at new generations of country music fans.

Moore has never been married and has no children. He stated that "...it's not like I'm out doing really wild stuff. It's just that my focus has been so hyper-driven on the music that even when I'm off the road I'm always back in the studio writing and creating." "I've been a boyfriend maybe three or four times in my whole life. I hang out here and there, but I'm that kind of that person who longs for so much solo time, freedom, alone time. It does seem like a lot of guys my age in this business are getting married, but I'll probably be the last bachelor standing!"

== Discography ==
- Up All Night (2012)
- Wild Ones (2015)
- Slowheart (2017)
- Wild World (2020)
- Damn Love (2023)
- Solitary Tracks (2025)
- Reason to Believe (2026)

== Awards and nominations ==
Year	Association	Category and Source	Result
2012	American Country Awards		
2012	American Country Awards	Single by a New Artist – "Somethin' 'Bout a Truck"	Nominated
2012	American Country Awards	Music Video by a New Artist – "Somethin' 'Bout a Truck"	Nominated
2013	Country Music Association Awards	New Artist of the Year	Nominated
2014	Country Music Association Awards	New Artist of the Year	Nominated
2023	Country Music Association Awards	International Artist Achievement Award	Nominated
2024	Country Music Association Awards	International Artist Achievement Award	Won
