= Brett James =

American singer-songwriter and record producer (1968–2025)

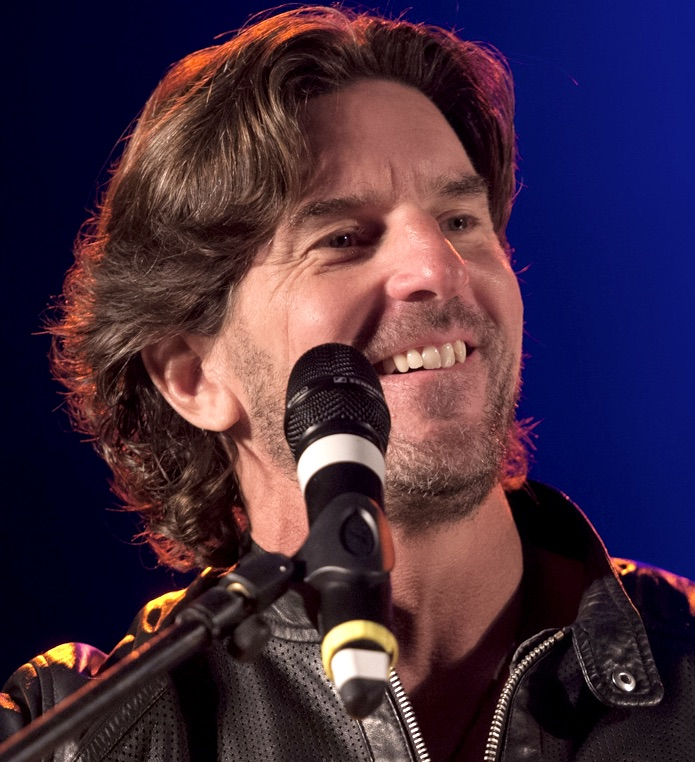
- James performing in 2015

Background information
- Born: Brett James Cornelius; June 5, 1968; Columbia, Missouri, U.S.
- Died: September 18, 2025 (aged 57) near Franklin, North Carolina, U.S.
- Cause of death: Airplane crash
- Genres: Country
- Occupation: Singer-songwriter; Record producer
- Instruments: Vocals; guitar
- Years active: 1995–2025
- Labels: Career; Arista Nashville

Brett James Cornelius (June 5, 1968 – September 18, 2025) was an American country music singer, songwriter, and record producer based in Nashville. James began his musical career in 1995 with a self-titled album on the former Arista Nashville's Career Records division, which charted three singles on the Billboard Hot Country Songs charts. He re-signed with Arista Nashville early in the 21st century and charted two more singles which were not included on an album.

In the beginning of the 21st century, James became known primarily as a songwriter for other country and pop music artists. Among his compositions is Carrie Underwood's number-one hit "Jesus, Take the Wheel", which received the Grammy Awards for Best Country Song and Best Female Country Vocal Performance. His writing credits include number-one hits for Jessica Andrews, Martina McBride, Kenny Chesney, Rodney Atkins and Jason Aldean.

James, along with his wife and daughter, died in an airplane crash in North Carolina on September 18, 2025.

== Early life and singing career ==
Brett James Cornelius was born in Columbia, Missouri, on June 5, 1968. His father, Sam Cornelius, was a physician. When he was a child, the family moved to Del City, Oklahoma, where he would graduate from Christian Heritage Academy. After high school, he attended Baylor University in Waco, Texas. While attending, he received a guitar as a Christmas gift from his parents, and began writing songs in his free time. Upon graduation from Baylor University, he began attending medical school at University of Oklahoma before choosing to drop out in favor of a country music career. He was inspired to do so after attending a Steve Wariner concert. During spring break, he and some friends moved to Nashville, Tennessee, in 1992, where he submitted demos with the intent of signing to a record label. He was rejected by two other labels before signing with Arista Nashville in 1993.

=== 1990s: Career Records ===
Crediting himself as Brett James, he began recording for Arista Nashville subsidiary Career Records. He recorded one self-titled album for Career, which accounted for three singles: "Female Bonding", "If I Could See Love", and "Worth the Fall". All made the Billboard Hot Country Singles & Tracks (now Hot Country Songs) charts, though none reached top 40. Also included on the album was "Wake Up and Smell the Whiskey", which was co-written and later released as a single by Dean Miller in 1997. In addition, he appeared on two compilation albums issued by Arista Nashville. The first was 1996's Star of Wonder: A Country Christmas, on which he sang "What Child Is This?", and the other was a country-gospel album entitled Peace in the Valley, to which he contributed a recording of "What a Friend We Have in Jesus." This latter album was also promoted via a special on the former TNN (the Nashville Network). In 1998, James and Tammy Graham were both dropped from Career Records when Arista chose to shut down the Career label.

Following the failure of his self-titled album, James began re-attending University of Oklahoma to study pathology, living in Oklahoma with his parents while his wife remained in Nashville. Despite this, he signed a second contract with Teracel, then a new song publishing company owned by Mark Bright, Six weeks into the agreement, James was accepted back into medical school and decided to resume his studies. Bright asked him if he would continue to write songs anyway satisfying the one-year agreement, and James promised to write every third day. He kept his promise and later said, "It was a big creative shift—letting go of the dream of being a big star and just trying to write some cool music." One song, "Love Is a Sweet Thing", was recorded by Faith Hill for her 1999 album Breathe. This led to him having over 30 of his compositions recorded by other artists, which in turn resulted in him dropping out of medical school in 2000, and returning to Nashville to resume music full-time.

=== 21st century: Return to career ===
Between mid-2001 and late 2002, James had further success as a songwriter when two of his compositions reached number one on the Billboard country charts. These were "Who I Am" by Jessica Andrews, and "Blessed" by Martina McBride. James was also offered an opportunity to join the band Sixwire, but declined. He then re-signed with Arista Nashville and began recording new material with producer and guitarist Dann Huff. The sessions with Huff resulted in the charting singles "Chasin' Amy" and "After All" between 2002 and 2003, although neither was included on an album.

Despite the failure of his return to Arista, James remained active as a songwriter. He had another number-one single in 2004 with "When the Sun Goes Down" by Kenny Chesney and Uncle Kracker. Two years later, Carrie Underwood had a number-one country single with James's composition "Jesus, Take the Wheel". The song also won a Grammy Award for Best Female Country Vocal Performance and Best Country Song, the latter of which was awarded to James and the song's other two songwriters. In September 2025, Underwood revealed that James "basically wrote 75% of" "Jesus, Take the Wheel" and also had it "ready when he walked in the room."

=== 2006–2025: Continued songwriting success ===
ASCAP named James as their country songwriter of the year in 2006, and again in 2010. Non-country artists who have recorded his works include Kelly Clarkson, the Backstreet Boys, Bon Jovi, and Paulina Rubio. James also co-wrote American Idol season 10 winner Scotty McCreery's debut single "I Love You This Big".

In 2008, James began working as a record producer with his production credits including Josh Gracin's We Weren't Crazy, Kristy Lee Cook's Why Wait, a re-release of Taylor Swift's self-titled debut album, Jessica Simpson's Do You Know and Kip Moore's Up All Night.

== Death ==
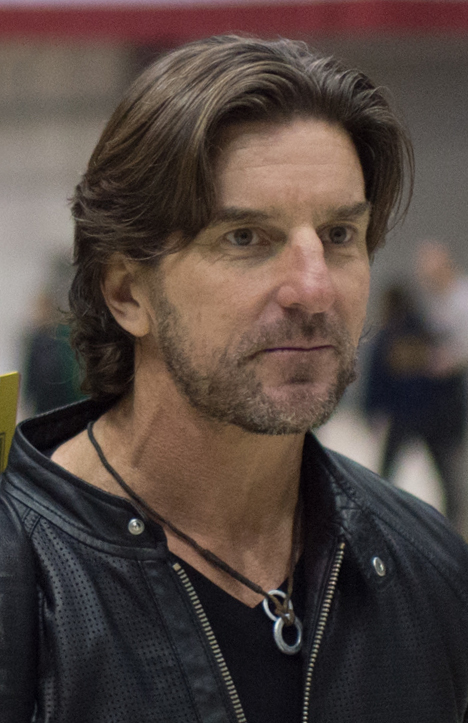
James, 2015

James was killed in the crash of his Cirrus SR22T airplane on the afternoon of September 18, 2025, near Franklin, North Carolina, at the age of 57. Two passengers aboard the plane – his second wife, Melody Wilson, 59, whom he married in 2021, and her daughter, Meryl Maxwell Wilson, 28 – also died in the accident. The plane had taken off from John C. Tune Airport near Nashville before crashing in a field by Iotla Valley Elementary School in Franklin. The aircraft, registered to James, came down near the runway of the Macon County Airport. FlightAware data showed that the plane's last recorded speed was 83 miles per hour (134 km/h). The National Transportation Safety Board is investigating the accident. No one onboard the plane at the time survived, and only three people were confirmed dead. James had four children by his first wife, Sandra Cornelius-Little. Country singers Dierks Bentley, Josh Gracin, Sara Evans and Carrie Underwood eulogized James in posts online.

== Songs written by Brett James ==
James's songwriting credits include 26 number-one country hits. Besides those songs, he wrote several other top-10 country hits, including cuts performed by Rascal Flatts, Josh Gracin, Sara Evans, Tim McGraw and others.

== Discography ==
=== Studio albums ===
Title	Album details
Brett James	Release date: September 12, 1995; Label: Career Records; Format: CD, cassette

=== Singles ===
Year	Single	Peak positions		Album
Year	Single	US Country	CAN Country	Album
1995	"Female Bonding"	60	89	Brett James
1995	"If I Could See Love"	68	—	Brett James
1995	"Worth the Fall"	73	—	Brett James
2002	"Chasin' Amy"	34	x	—N/a
2003	"After All"	39	x	—N/a
"—" denotes releases that did not chart "x" indicates that no relevant chart existed at the time

=== Music videos ===
Year	Video
1995	"Female Bonding"
1995	"If I Could See Love"

== Works cited ==
- Whitburn, Joel (2017). Hot Country Songs 1944 to 2017. Record Research, Inc. ISBN 978-0-89820-229-8.
