= Barely Famous Hits =

Compilation album by The Warren Brothers
- Released: August 2, 2005
- Genre: Country
- Label: BNA
- Producer: Chris Farren, Jay Joyce, The Warren Brothers

The Warren Brothers chronology
Well Deserved Obscurity (2004)	Barely Famous Hits (2005)

Barely Famous Hits is the fourth studio album by American country music duo The Warren Brothers. It was released in 2005 via BNA Records. The album reprises songs from the duo's first three studio albums, two of which were also released on BNA.

It received a rating of 3½ stars on Allmusic. Stephen Thomas Erlewine considered the songs well-written but thought that the brothers did not have a strong musical presence.

== Track listing ==
No.	Title	Writer(s)	Length
1.	"Change"	Brad Warren, Brett Warren	2:53
2.	"What We Can't Have"	Brad Warren, Brett Warren	4:04
3.	"Greyhound Bus"	Tom Douglas, Brad Warren, Brett Warren	3:56
4.	"Guilty"	Dave Berg, Brad Warren, Brett Warren	4:03
5.	"Come Back"	Brad Warren, Brett Warren	5:00
6.	"Where Does It Hurt"	Douglas, Brad Warren, Brett Warren	4:04
7.	"Waiting for the Light to Change"	Benmont Tench, Brad Warren, Brett Warren	3:45
8.	"Move On"	Brad Warren, Brett Warren, Danny Wilde	3:15
9.	"Hey Mr. President"	Douglas	4:17
10.	"Sell a Lot of Beer"	Brad Warren, Brett Warren, Bill Anderson	4:04
11.	"King of Nothing"	James House, Brad Warren, Brett Warren	4:27
12.	"That's the Beat of a Heart" (featuring Sara Evans)	Tena Clark, Tim Heintz	3:36

== Personnel ==
=== The Warren Brothers ===
- Brad Warren- background vocals, acoustic guitar, electric guitar
- Brett Warren- lead vocals, acoustic guitar, harmonica

=== Additional Musicians ===
- Dave Berg- background vocals
- Eric Borash- electric guitar, mandolin
- Bruce Bouton- keyboards, lap steel guitar, pedal steel guitar
- Mike Brignardello- bass guitar
- Tom Bukovac- acoustic guitar
- Luke Butta- violin
- Paul Bushnell- bass guitar
- Stephen E. Byam- pedal steel guitar
- Angelo Collura- drums, percussion
- Mike Daly- pedal steel guitar
- Sara Evans- background vocals on "That's the Beat of a Heart"
- Chris Farren- keyboards, background vocals
- Shannon Forrest- drums, percussion
- Larry Franklin- fiddle
- Byron Gallimore- synthesizer strings
- Tony Harrell- keyboards, synthesizer strings
- John Hobbs- keyboards, piano
- Jennie Hoeft- drums, percussion
- Mike Holder- Dobro, lap steel guitar, pedal steel guitar
- Ronn Huff- string conductor, string arrangements
- Randy Kohrs- Dobro
- Chris McHugh- drums, percussion
- Marty McIntosh- bass guitar, background vocals
- Georgia Middleman- background vocals
- Greg Morrow- drums, percussion
- The Nashville String Machine- strings
- Steve Nathan- piano, synthesizer, synthesizer strings
- LeAnn Phelan- background vocals
- Darrell Scott- bouzouki, dobro, mandolin
- Adam Shoenfeld- electric guitar
- Rob Stoney- Hammond B-3 organ, piano, Wurlitzer
- Benmont Tench- keyboards
- Jonathan Yudkin- cello

== Chart performance ==
Chart (2005)	Peak position
U.S. Top Country Albums	35
U.S. Top Heatseekers	6
