= Streets of Heaven =

Streets of Heaven may refer to:

- Streets of Heaven (album) by Sherrié Austin
- Streets of Heaven, album by John Illsley 2010
- Streets of Heaven (song) by Sherrié Austin
