= Larry Franklin (musician) =

American musician

- Born: Larry Alvin Franklin; August 5, 1953 (age 72); Sherman, Texas
- Genres: Country music, Western swing, Blues, Jazz, Rock and Roll
- Occupation: Musician
- Instruments: Fiddle, mandolin and guitar
- Years active: 1976–present
- Website: larry-franklin.com

Larry Alvin Franklin (born August 5, 1953) is an American fiddler, mandolin and guitar player, session musician, and composer. His style embraces country, blues, rock and roll, jazz, and Western swing.

== Biography ==
=== Early years ===
Growing up in Whitewright, Texas, Franklin took up the fiddle at age 7. He was inspired by his father Louis Franklin and his great uncle Major Franklin, well-known Texas-style fiddlers. Franklin's first fiddler's contest, at age 7, was in Hale Center, Texas, on July 4, 1960, where he met famed fiddler Uncle Eck Robertson. He continued competing and winning championships through his teens and won the World Championship in Crockett, Texas, when he was 16 years old.

Franklin performed with dance bands while in high school. After three years in the Army (1972-1975), he co-founded the Cooder Browne Band, who were signed by Willie Nelson to his Lone Star Records label where they released one album. Franklin was with the band from 1976 until 1980.

=== Asleep at the Wheel ===
After leading his own Larry Franklin Band from 1980 until 1984, Franklin performed with Asleep At The Wheel from 1984 until 1991. They won two Grammy Awards for Instrumental of the Year: in 1987 for "String of Pars" (co-written by Franklin), and in 1988 for "Sugarfoot Rag". They won another Grammy in 1999 for "Bob's Breakdowns" on the Ridin' with Bob album.

=== Session work and touring ===
Franklin moved to Nashville in 1991 to work as a session musician. He has worked with Lee Ann Womack, Martina McBride, Alan Jackson, Vince Gill, Ray Price, Mel Tillis, and Miranda Lambert, among others.

=== The Time Jumpers ===
Franklin performs Monday nights at 3rd and Lindsley in Nashville with the Time Jumpers, an 11-piece Western swing band anchored by three fiddles played by Kenny Sears, Joe Spivey, and Franklin. Other members include Vince Gill (guitar), Doug Green (guitar), Paul Franklin (steel guitar), Brad Albin (bass), Andy Reiss (guitar), Jeff Taylor (accordion, piano), and Billy Thomas (drums).

=== Sons of the Palomino ===
Franklin is a member of Sons of the Palomino, led by Jeffrey Steele. The band also includes Paul Franklin, Jerry Roe, Tony Harrell, James Mitchell, and Brad Albin.

=== Louis Franklin Fiddlefest ===
In 2005, Franklin started the annual Louis Franklin Championship Fiddlefest with his nephew Jason Andrew and 2010 was the final year it was held.

=== Awards ===
While a member of Asleep at the Wheel, Franklin won two Grammy Awards for Instrumental Performance of the Year in 1987 and 1988. Larry won a third Grammy as a guest with Asleep at the Wheel for Instrumental Performance of the Year in 1999 for "Bob's Breakdowns" from the Ridin' with Bob album.

In 1997 and 2002 the Academy of Country Music awarded him the Fiddle Player of the Year award.

Franklin was inducted into the Texas Fiddlers' Hall Of Fame in 2002 and the National Fiddlers Hall of Fame in Tulsa, Oklahoma in 2017.

== Discography ==
=== Solo albums ===
- 1978: Keepsake Album with father Louis Franklin (self-released)
- 2001: Now and Then (self-released)
- 2010: The Texas Fiddle Album with Ray & Royce Franklin and Steve Williams (self-released)

=== Cooder Browne ===
- 1978: Cooder Browne (Lone Star)

=== Louis & Larry Franklin ===
- 1981: Keepsake Album (self-released) reissued in 2007

=== With Asleep at the Wheel ===
- 1984: Pasture Prime (MCA/DOT)
- 1987: 10 (Epic)
- 1988: Western Standard Time (CBS Records)
- 1990: Keepin' Me Up Nights (Arista)
- 1992: Greatest Hits Live & Kickin' (Arista)
- 1999: Ride With Bob (DreamWorks)
- 2015 Still The King (Bismeaux/Mailboat)

=== The Time Jumpers ===
- 2007: Jumpin' Time (self-released)
- 2012: The Time Jumpers (Rounder)
- 2016: Kid Sister (Rounder)

=== The Sons of the Palomino ===
- 2017: Sons of the Palomino (3 Ring Circus)

=== Also appears on ===
==== 1985-1996 ====
- 1985: The Marksmen with The Cox Family - Quality Mountain Time (Wahoo Creek)
- 1993: Martina McBride - The Way That I Am (RCA)
- 1993: Dude Mowrey - Dude Mowrey (Arista)
- 1994: Alan Jackson - Who I Am (Arista)
- 1994: Gary P. Nunn - Roadtrip (Campfire)
- 1995: 4 Runner - 4 Runner (Polydor)
- 1995: Martina McBride - Wild Angels (RCA)
- 1995: Ronna Reeves - After the Dance (River North Nashville)
- 1995: B. J. Thomas - I Believe (Warner Resound)
- 1996: John Berry - Faces (Capitol Nashville)
- 1996: Deana Carter - Did I Shave My Legs for This? (Capitol Nashville)
- 1996: Ty England - Two Ways to Fall (RCA)
- 1996: Ty Herndon - Living in a Moment (Epic)
- 1996: Alan Jackson - Everything I Love (Arista)
- 1996: Chris LeDoux - Stampede (Capitol Nashville)
- 1996: Reba McEntire - What If It's You (MCA)
- 1996: Joe Nichols - Joe Nichols (Intersound)
- 1996: Ricochet - Ricochet (Columbia)
- 1996: LeAnn Rimes - Blue (Curb)
- 1996: Kevin Sharp - Measure of a Man (143 / Asylum)
- 1996: Chely Wright - Right in the Middle of It (Polydor)

==== 1997-1999 ====
- 1997: Sherrié Austin - Words (Arista Nashville)
- 1997: Mark Chesnutt - Thank God for Believers (Decca)
- 1997: Holly Dunn - Leave One Bridge Standing (River North Nashville)
- 1997: Matt King - Five O'Clock Hero (Atlantic)
- 1997: The Kinleys - Just Between You and Me (Epic)
- 1997: Lonestar - Crazy Nights (BNA)
- 1997: Martina McBride - Evolution (RCA)
- 1997: Jim Messina - Watching the River Run (River North)
- 1997: Lorrie Morgan - Shakin' Things Up (BNA)
- 1997: Ricochet - Blink of an Eye (Columbia)
- 1997: Shania Twain - Come On Over (Mercury)
- 1997: Lee Ann Womack - Lee Ann Womack (Decca)
- 1998: Brooks & Dunn - If You See Her (Arista Nashville)
- 1998: Deana Carter - Everything's Gonna Be Alright (Capitol Nashville)
- 1998: Sara Evans - No Place That Far (RCA)
- 1998: Vince Gill - The Key (MCA Nashville)
- 1998: Wade Hayes - When the Wrong One Loves You Right (Columbia)
- 1998: Ty Herndon - Big Hopes (Epic)
- 1998: Faith Hill - Faith (Warner Bros.)
- 1998: Alan Jackson - High Mileage (Arista)
- 1998: Reba McEntire - If You See Him (MCA Nashville)
- 1998: Kevin Sharp - Love Is (Asylum)
- 1998: Brian Wilson - Imagination (Giant)
- 1999: Trace Adkins - More... (Capitol Nashville)
- 1999: Sherrié Austin - Love in the Real World (Arista Nashville)
- 1999: The Bacon Brothers - Getting There (Bluxo)
- 1999: John Berry - Wildest Dreams (Lyric Street)
- 1999: Brooks & Dunn - Tight Rope (Arista Nashville)
- 1999: Tracy Byrd - It's About Time (RCA)
- 1999: Kenny Chesney - Everywhere We Go (BNA)
- 1999: Mark Chesnutt - I Don't Want to Miss a Thing (Decca)
- 1999: Alan Jackson - Under the Influence (Arista)
- 1999: Lace - Lace (143 / Warner Bros.)
- 1999: Lorrie Morgan - My Heart (BNA)
- 1999: The Warren Brothers - Beautiful Day in the Cold Cruel World (BMG / Ariola)

==== 2000-2003 ====
- 2000: Alabama - When It All Goes South (RCA)
- 2000: Mark Chesnutt - Lost in the Feeling (MCA Nashville)
- 2000: Alan Jackson - When Somebody Loves You (Arista)
- 2000: The Kinleys - II (Epic)
- 2000: Eddy Raven - Living in Black and White (RMG)
- 2000: Ricochet - What You Leave Behind (Columbia)
- 2000: Kenny Rogers - There You Go Again (Dreamcatcher)
- 2000: Phil Vassar - Phil Vassar (Arista Nashville)
- 2000: The Warren Brothers - King of Nothing (BNA)
- 2000: Lee Ann Womack - I Hope You Dance (MCA Nashville)
- 2001: Trace Adkins - Chrome (Capitol Nashville)
- 2001: Sherrié Austin - Followin' a Feelin' (WE)
- 2001: Tracy Byrd - Ten Rounds (RCA Nashville)
- 2001: Lonestar - I'm Already There (BNA)
- 2001: Lorrie Morgan and Sammy Kershaw - I Finally Found Someone (RCA)
- 2001: Chely Wright - Never Love You Enough (MCA Nashville)
- 2002: Kate Campbell - Monuments (Evangeline)
- 2002: Kenny Chesney - No Shoes, No Shirt, No Problems (BNA)
- 2002: Mark Chesnutt - Mark Chesnutt (Columbia Nashville)
- 2002: Hank Williams Jr. - Almeria Club (Curb)
- 2003: Sherrié Austin - Streets of Heaven (Broken Bow)
- 2003: Reba McEntire- Room to Breathe (MCA Nashville)
- 2003: Kenny Rogers - Back to the Well (Sanctuary)
- 2003: Randy Travis - Worship & Faith (Curb / Warner Bros.)

==== 2004-2006 ====
- 2004: Mark Chesnutt - Savin' the Honky Tonk (Vivaton!)
- 2004: Joe Nichols - Revelation (Universal South)
- 2004: Randy Travis - Passing Through (Curb / Warner Bros.)
- 2004: Phil Vassar - Shaken Not Stirred (Arista Nashville)
- 2004: Gretchen Wilson - Here for the Party (Epic)
- 2004: Chely Wright - Everything EP (Painted Red)
- 2005: Brooks & Dunn - Hillbilly Deluxe (Arista Nashville)
- 2005: George Jones - Hits I Missed...And One I Didn't (Bandit)
- 2005: Craig Morgan - My Kind of Livin' (Broken Bow)
- 2005: Joe Nichols - III (Universal South)
- 2005: Randy Travis - Glory Train: Songs of Faith, Worship, and Praise (Curb / Warner Bros.)
- 2005: The Warren Brothers - Barely Famous Hits (BNA)
- 2006: Rodney Atkins - If You're Going Through Hell (Curb)
- 2006: Steve Holy - Brand New Girlfriend (Curb)
- 2006: George Jones and Merle Haggard - Kickin' Out the Footlights...Again (Bandit)
- 2006: Martina McBride - Waking Up Laughing (RCA)
- 2006: Craig Morgan - Little Bit of Life (Broken Bow)

==== 2007-2011 ====
- 2007: Lonestar - My Christmas List (Cracker Barrel)
- 2007: Randy Travis - Songs of the Season (Word)
- 2007: Van Zant - My Kind of Country (Sony BMG)
- 2008: Catherine Britt - Little Wildflower (ABC Music)
- 2008: Mark Chesnutt - Rollin' with the Flow (Lofton Creek)
- 2008: Lady Antebellum - Lady Antebellum (Capitol Nashville)
- 2008: Randy Travis - Around the Bend (Warner Bros. Nashville)
- 2008: Lee Ann Womack - Call Me Crazy (MCA Nashville)
- 2009: Rodney Atkins - It's America (Curb)
- 2009: Lorrie Morgan - A Moment in Time (Stroudavarious / Country Crossing)
- 2010: Kenny Chesney - Hemingway's Whiskey (BNA)
- 2010: Easton Corbin - Easton Corbin (Mercury)
- 2010: Lady Antebellum - Need You Now (Capitol Nashville)
- 2010: Lonestar - Party Heard Around the World (Saguaro Road)
- 2011: Lauren Alaina - Wildflower (Mercury Nashville)
- 2011: Rodney Atkins - Take a Back Road (Curb)
- 2011: LeAnn Rimes - Lady & Gentlemen (Curb)

==== 2012-2024 ====
- 2012: Dierks Bentley - Home (Capitol Nashville)
- 2012: Easton Corbin - All Over the Road (Mercury Nashville)
- 2012: Alan Jackson - Thirty Miles West (EMI Nashville)
- 2012: Waylon Jennings - Goin' Down Rockin': The Last Recordings (Saguaro Road)
- 2012: Jamey Johnson - Living for a Song: A Tribute to Hank Cochran (Mercury)
- 2012: Grace Potter and the Nocturnals - The Lion the Beast the Beat (Hollywood)
- 2012: Hank Williams Jr. - Old School New Rules (Bocephus)
- 2013: Danielle Bradbery - Danielle Bradbery (Republic Nashville)
- 2013: Vince Gill and Paul Franklin - Bakersfield (MCA Nashville)
- 2013: Emmylou Harris and Rodney Crowell - Old Yellow Moon (Nonesuch)
- 2013: Sylvie Vartan - Sylvie in Nashville (RCA / Sony)
- 2014: Garth Brooks - Man Against Machine (RCA)
- 2014: The Common Linnets - The Common Linnets (Firefly / Universal)
- 2014: Joey + Rory - Country Classics: A Tapestry of Our Musical Heritage (Gaither)
- 2014: Billy Joe Shaver - Long in the Tooth (Lightning Rod)
- 2015: Alabama - Southern Drawl (BMG Chrysalis)
- 2015: Clint Black - On Purpose (Blacktop)
- 2015: Easton Corbin - About to Get Real (Mercury Nashville)
- 2015: Emmylou Harris and Rodney Crowell - The Traveling Kind (Nonesuch)
- 2015: Alan Jackson - Angels and Alcohol (EMI Nashville)
- 2015: Kid Rock - First Kiss (Warner Bros.)
- 2015: Tim McGraw - Damn Country Music (Big Machine)
- 2016: Craig Morgan - A Whole Lot More to Me (Black River Entertainment)
- 2016: Kacey Musgraves - A Very Kacey Christmas (Mercury)
- 2016: Willie Nelson - For the Good Times: A Tribute to Ray Price (Legacy)
- 2017: Tony Jackson - Tony Jackson (DDS Entertainment)
- 2017: Lorrie Morgan and Pam Tillis - Come See Me and Come Lonely (Goldenlane)
- 2017: Gretchen Wilson - Ready to Get Rowdy (Redneck)
- 2024: Country Bear Musical Jamboree - "Supercalifragilisticexpialidocious" (Disney)
