= She Wants to Rock =

Single by The Warren Brothers

from the album Beautiful Day in the Cold Cruel World
- Released: May 29, 1999
- Genre: Country
- Length: 2:52
- Label: BNA
- Songwriter(s): Brad Warren, Brett Warren, Rob Stoney
- Producer(s): Chris Farren

The Warren Brothers singles chronology
| "Better Man" (1999) | "She Wants to Rock" (1999) | "That's the Beat of a Heart" (2000) |

"She Wants to Rock" is a song co-written and recorded by American country music duo The Warren Brothers. It was released in May 1999 as the third single from the album Beautiful Day in the Cold Cruel World. The song reached #37 on the Billboard Hot Country Singles & Tracks chart. The song was written by Brad Warren, Brett Warren and Rob Stoney.

== Chart performance ==
| Chart (1999) | Peak position |
|---|---|
| US Hot Country Songs (Billboard) | 37 |
| Canadian RPM Country Tracks | 61 |
