= Followin' a Feelin' =

Studio album by Sherrié Austin
- Released: March 20, 2001
- Genre: Country
- Label: WE
- Producer: Will Rambeaux

Sherrié Austin chronology
Love in the Real World (1999)	Followin' a Feelin' (2001)	Streets of Heaven (2003)

Singles from Followin' a Feelin'
- 1. "Jolene" Released: March 19, 2001; 2. "In the Meantime" Released: August 2001

Followin' a Feelin' is the third studio album by Australian country music artist Sherrié Austin. It was released in 2001 by WE Records and peaked at No. 43 on the Billboard Top Country Albums chart. The album's only charted single was a cover of Dolly Parton's "Jolene". Austin's version of the song reached No. 55 on the Hot Country Songs charts in July 2001.

== Critical reception ==
Maria Konicki Dinoia of Allmusic gave the album 4 out of 5 stars, saying that "She's evolved into an exceptionally strong songwriter, having written or co-written nine of the album's ten virtually flawless tracks."

== Track listing ==
1. "Followin' a Feelin'" (Sherrié Austin, Rob Crosby, Will Rambeaux) — 3:19
2. "Jolene" (Dolly Parton) — 3:17
3. "Goin' Goin' Gone" (Austin, Rambeaux, Jon Christopher Davis) — 4:14
4. "Somethin' Missin' in the Kissin'" (Austin, Rambeaux, Blair Daly) — 3:21
5. "In the Meantime" (Austin, Rambeaux, Crosby) — 3:41
6. "My Brilliant Mistake" (Austin, Rambeaux, Greg Barnhill) — 3:17
7. "In Our Own Sweet Time" (Austin, Rambeaux, Marcus Hummon) — 3:07
8. "Love Melts Even the Coldest Hearts" (Austin, Shawna Harrington-Burkhart) — 3:17
9. "Back Where I Belong" (Austin, Rambeaux, Kimberly Roads, Philip Sweet) — 3:00
10. "Time, Love and Money" (Austin, Rambeaux, Dave Berg) — 3:11

== Personnel ==
- Stephanie Bentley - backing vocals
- Pat Buchanan - electric guitar
- J. T. Corenflos - electric guitar
- Jon Christopher Davis - backing vocals
- Larry Franklin - mandolin, fiddle
- Jimmy Hull - harmonica
- Mike Joyce - bass
- Troy Lancaster - electric guitar
- Tim Lauer - keyboards
- Gary McIntyre - steel guitar
- Russ Pahl - steel guitar
- Kim Parent - backing vocals
- Paul Scholten - drums
- Steven Sheehan - acoustic guitar
- Barry Walsh - keyboards

== Chart performance ==
Chart (2001)	Peak position
U.S. Billboard Top Country Albums	43
U.S. Billboard Top Independent Albums	38
