= Shame About That =

Single by Sara Evans

from the album Three Chords and the Truth
- B-side: "Shame About That" (remix)
- Released: December 2, 1997
- Recorded: February 1997
- Studio: Mad Dog Studios
- Genre: Country; Neotraditional country
- Length: 2:02
- Label: RCA Nashville
- Songwriter(s): Sara Evans; Jamie O'Hara
- Producer(s): Pete Anderson

Sara Evans singles chronology
| "Three Chords and the Truth" (1997) | "Shame About That" (1997) | "Cryin' Game" (1998) |

"Shame About That" is a song written by American country artist Sara Evans and American songwriter Jamie O'Hara. In 1997, Sara Evans released it as the third and final single off her debut studio album called Three Chords and the Truth. The song was a minor hit on the Billboard country chart and received positive reception from critics.

== Background ==
"Shame About That" was characterized by The Washington Post in 1997 as a Buddy Holly-inspired song with a simple arrangement. The song was recorded in February 1997 at Mad Dog Studios, located in Burbank, California. It was recorded in Evans's very first major-label studio sessions on her career. The song was produced by Pete Anderson, who would also supervise the recording of her debut studio album, which was also released in 1997. Songs including "Imagine That" and "True Lies" were also cut during the same session.

== Critical reception ==
Following Evans' debut album release, "Shame About That" received mostly positive reviews from critics and music writers. Mike Joyce of The Washington Post praised her performance on the track (among others on the album) and compared it to veteran music artists. "Evans responds with a winning performance -- sometimes soulful, sometimes spirited but always convincing," he commented in 1997. Grant Alden of No Depression magazine praised Evans's performance, but found the song's opening bar "cheesy". In his review he also noted of Evans's similarity to that of Jazz performer Julie London.

== Release and chart performance ==
"Shame About That" was released on December 2, 1997 via RCA Nashville. It featured a remix of the single on the song's B-side that was roughly the same length in time. In total, the song spent eight weeks on the Billboard Hot Country Songs chart, peaking at number 48 in February 1998. It was Evans's third single to reach the Billboard chart and her second high-charting single up to that point. "Shame About That" was spawned from her 1997 debut studio album on RCA Records, Three Chords and the Truth. "Shame About That" was the third and final single spawned from the album before her next studio offering was issued in 1998.

== Track listing ==
7" vinyl single

- "Shame About That" – 2:02
- "Shame About That" (remix) – 2:01

== Charts ==
Chart performance for "Shame About That"
| Chart (1997–1998) | Peak position |
|---|---|
| US Hot Country Songs (Billboard) | 48 |
