= How I Feel =

How I Feel may refer to:

- How I Feel (album), a 1998 album by Terri Clark
- "How I Feel" (Flo Rida song), 2013
- "How I Feel" (Martina McBride song), 2007
- "How I Feel", a song by Kelly Clarkson from My December
