= Circus Girl =

Circus Girl may refer to:

- Circus Girl (film), a 1937 American film
- Circus Girl (album) or the title song, by Sherrié Austin, 2011
- The Circus Girl, an 1896 stage musical
- Circus Girl, a 1957 children's book by Jack Sendak
