= Jon Christopher Davis =

American singer-songwriter

Background information
- Born: Jon Christopher Davis; June 27, 1968 (age 58)
- Origin: Dallas, Texas
- Genres: Rock; indie rock; heartland rock; Americana
- Occupations: Producer; musician; songwriter
- Years active: 1990–present

Jon Christopher Davis (born June 27, 1968) is an American singer, songwriter and record producer whose musical style encompasses rock, soul and country. His songs have been covered by Dolly Parton, Hal Ketchum, Timothy B. Schmit of the Eagles, Billy Ray Cyrus, Sherrie Austin, Tammy Cochran and various indie artists. His music has been featured on ABC, CBS, FOX, CMT and in USA Today, Billboard, Texas Highways and the Washington Post. His discography includes work with Vince Gill, Radney Foster, Rodney Crowell, Steve Lukather (Toto), Stan Lynch (Tom Petty and the Heartbreakers), Dann Huff (Carrie Underwood, Keith Urban) and David Z (Prince, Jonny Lang).

== Early career ==
Davis began his career in 1990 by playing the Dallas bar scene. In 1996, he was encouraged to move to Nashville by Grammy Award-winner, Rodney Crowell. In 1998, Davis signed with Warner/Chappell Music where he wrote songs for major-label artists. The following year, he signed an artist development deal with Warner Bros. Records. After six months, the label considered the recordings to be too left of center and eventually shelved the project. Those self-produced recordings caught the ear of hit producer, Dann Huff, who later signed Davis to his new subsidiary label under Sony Records.

== 2002–2007 ==
In 2002, Davis signed with MCA Records where fellow Texas singer-songwriter, Radney Foster, came on board as producer. Davis also signed a new publishing deal with BMG Publishing. When MCA decided to not release the record, Davis returned to his Texas roots and signed with the indie label, Palo Duro Records. After his debut album received a national release in 2006, USA Today called his song, The Bottom Line, "One of the most intriguing tracks from the present, past and near future." The album also caught the attention of renowned music critic, Robert K. Oermann – "I’m a huge fan of this man’s album. Its second single sizzles with zesty rhythm, yelping vocals, sidewinder guitar and a ridiculously catchy melody. The major-label 'stars' on Music Row have nothing on this guy."

== 2008–2013 ==
In 2008, Davis released the patriotic single, The Boy I Left Behind, with fellow Texas singer-songwriter, Deryl Dodd. It became the official theme song for The American Fallen Soldiers Project.

In 2009, Davis was the Texas statewide voice for TXU Energy. That same year, he released "Demos From the Vault (1999–2009)." The double album features guest appearances by Vince Gill, Radney Foster, Jon Randall, Steve Lukather (Toto) and Stan Lynch (The Heartbreakers).

In 2010, Davis was awarded Song of the Year by the American Cancer Society.

In 2012, Davis was a featured artist on Troubadour TX, a national TV show following the careers of Texas singer-songwriters.

In 2013, LSA Burger Co. (named after his top 40 dance hall track, Lone Star Attitude) opened in Denton, TX. A second location is in The Colony, TX. There are also two airport stores named after Lone Star Attitude located at DFW International Airport.

== 2014–present ==
In 2014, Davis released the album Last Night's Dinner Party.

In 2016, Davis collaborated with CMA Song of the Year nominee, Max T. Barnes, on several singles and produced eight music videos.

In 2018, Davis released the album New Wind Blowing.

In 2020, Davis released the EP The Ride.

Davis is currently working on a new band project with Stan Lynch (Tom Petty and the Heartbreakers, Don Henley) called The Speaker Wars.

== Discography ==
Albums

- Jon Christopher Davis Live (2005)
- Jon Christopher Davis (2006)
- Demos from the Vault (1999–2009)
- Last Night's Dinner Party (2014)
- New Wind Blowing (2018)
- The Ride (2020)
