= Better Man (The Warren Brothers song) =

Single by The Warren Brothers

from the album Beautiful Day in the Cold Cruel World
- B-side: "Guilty"
- Released: January 16, 1999
- Genre: Country
- Length: 4:12
- Label: BNA
- Songwriter(s): Brad Warren, Brett Warren, Gary Nicholson
- Producer(s): Chris Farren

The Warren Brothers singles chronology
"Guilty" (1998)	"Better Man" (1999)	"She Wants to Rock" (1999)

"Better Man" is a song co-written and recorded by American country music duo The Warren Brothers. It was released in January 1999 as the second single from the album Beautiful Day in the Cold Cruel World. The song reached #32 on the Billboard Hot Country Singles & Tracks chart. The song was written by Brad Warren, Brett Warren and Gary Nicholson.

== Chart performance ==
Chart (1999)	Peak position
US Hot Country Songs (Billboard)	32
Canadian RPM Country Tracks	46
