= Waking Up Laughing =

Studio album by Martina McBride
- Released: April 3, 2007
- Recorded: 2006
- Studio: Blackbird (Nashville, Tennessee); Capitol (Hollywood, California)
- Genre: Country
- Length: 41:03
- Label: RCA Nashville
- Producer: Martina McBride

Martina McBride chronology
Timeless (2005)	Waking Up Laughing (2007)	Live in Concert (2008)

Singles from Waking Up Laughing
- 1. "Anyway" Released: November 20, 2006; 2. "How I Feel" Released: May 2007; 3. "For These Times" Released: October 2007

Professional ratings
Review scores
Source	Rating
About.com	5/5 stars
Allmusic	3.5/5 stars
BBC Music	(favorable)
Country Weekly	(positive)
Entertainment Weekly	B+
The New York Times	(positive)
People	3.5/4 stars
Plugged In (publication)	(favorable)

Waking Up Laughing is the ninth studio album by American country music singer Martina McBride. It was released on April 3, 2007, through RCA Nashville. This album is the first in McBride's career in which she has both co-written songs and been involved in the production single-handedly. This album produced three chart singles for McBride on the US Billboard Hot Country Songs chart with "Anyway" at #5, "How I Feel" at #15, and "For These Times" at #35. The album was certified Gold by the RIAA.

== Content ==
Waking Up Laughing is the first album of McBride's career in which she co-wrote any of the material. McBride wrote the lead-off single "Anyway" with Brad and Brett Warren of The Warren Brothers. This song reached #5 on the Hot Country Songs charts in early 2007, becoming McBride's first Top 10 country hit in three years. The Warren Brothers and McBride also co-wrote "How I Feel", the second single, with Chris Lindsey and Aimee Mayo.

"For These Times" was inspired by former Republican senator Rick Santorum, who was defeated in 2006, and his daughter. When his daughter began to cry at his loss, the cameras focused on her, inspiring Leslie Satcher to write the song. It was also inspired by her Pastor, who stated "For these times in which we live, you are going to need this book." referring to the Bible. The song received a 2009 Grammy nomination.

"Cry Cry ('Til the Sun Shines)" was covered by former Trick Pony lead vocalist Heidi Newfield on her debut solo album, What Am I Waiting For, from which it was released as a single in November 2008.

== Track listing ==
No.	Title	Writer(s)	Length
1.	"If I Had Your Name"	Gordie Sampson; Steve McEwan; Hillary Lindsey	3:43
2.	"Cry Cry ('Til the Sun Shines)"	Chris Lindsey; H. Lindsey; Aimee Mayo; Marv Green	3:06
3.	"Tryin' to Find a Reason"	Tommy Lee James; Jeremy Stover	3:26
4.	"For These Times"	Leslie Satcher	4:16
5.	"Anyway"	Martina McBride; Brad Warren; Brett Warren	4:40
6.	"How I Feel"	McBride; C. Lindsey; Mayo; Brad Warren, Brett Warren	3:48
7.	"I'll Still Be Me"	Rachel Thibodeau; Tammy Hyler	3:49
8.	"Beautiful Again"	McBride; Brad Warren; Brett Warren	2:56
9.	"Everybody Does"	Michael Mobley; Dan DeMay; Rachel Proctor	3:27
10.	"House of a Thousand Dreams"	Billy Montana; Ilya Toshinsky; Jenai (Tammy L.Wagoner)	3:53
11.	"Love Land"	Thibodeau; Tom Douglas	3:56
12.	"Blue Bayou" (iTunes pre-order bonus track)	Roy Orbison; Joe Melson	4:05
Total length:			41:03

Limited edition bonus DVD
No.	Title	Length
1.	"The Making of "Anyway" Music Video"
2.	"Choosing Songs"
3.	"Producing"
4.	"Naming the Album"
5.	"The Tour"
6.	"Icing on the Cake"

== Personnel ==
- Martina McBride – lead vocals, harmony vocals(2, 8, 9)
- Steve Nathan – acoustic piano (1, 4, 7, 10, 11), Hammond B3 organ (1, 4, 6, 8, 9), synthesizers (10, 11)
- Reese Wynans – Hammond B3 organ (2, 3)
- Tim Lauer – synthesizers (3), accordion (8, 10), pump organ (10)
- Gordon Mote – acoustic piano (5)
- B. James Lowry – acoustic guitar
- Bryan Sutton – mandolin (1, 4, 8), acoustic guitar (2, 3, 4, 6, 7, 8, 11)
- Biff Watson – acoustic guitar (6, 9, 10)
- Dan Dugmore – electric guitar (1, 2, 4, 6, 9), steel guitar (3, 7, 8, 10, 11), dobro (5)
- Brent Mason – electric guitar (1–5, 7, 9, 11), acoustic guitar (8)
- Paul Worley – electric guitar (2, 5, 6, 10), acoustic guitar (5)
- Keith Urban – guitar solo (3), harmony vocals (3)
- J.T. Corenflos – electric guitar (5)
- Steve Gibson – electric guitar (5)
- Dann Huff – electric guitar (5, 6, 9, 10, 11)
- Stuart Duncan – mandolin (3), fiddle (3)
- Jonathan Yudkin – mandolin (10), strings (10) string arrangements (10)
- Paul Franklin – steel guitar (1)
- Glenn Worf – bass
- Matt Chamberlain – drums
- David Huff – percussion (2–10)
- Larry Franklin – fiddle (1, 8)
- Anthony LaMarchina – cello (6, 7)
- Kristin Wilkinson – viola (6, 7), additional string arrangements (6), string arrangements (7)
- David Davidson – violin (6, 7)
- Karen Winklemann – violin (6, 7)
- Wes Hightower – harmony vocals (1, 9)
- Troy Johnson – harmony vocals (1, 9)
- Brett Warren – harmony vocals (2, 6)
- Bob Bailey – harmony vocals (4)
- Kim Fleming – harmony vocals (4)
- Vicki Hampton – harmony vocals (4)
- Carolyn Dawn Johnson – harmony vocals (8)
- Jenifer Wrinkle – harmony vocals (10)

The Nashville String Machine on "Anyway" and "How I Feel"

- David Campbell – arrangements and conductor
- Bettie Ross – concertmaster on "How I Feel"
- Eberhard Ramm – music copyist
- Kirsten Cassel, Anthony LaMarchina, Carole Rabinowitz and Sarighani Reist – cello
- Monisa Angell, Jim Grosjean, Gary Vanosdale and Kristin Wilkinson – viola
- David Angell, David Davidson, Conni Ellisor, Carl Gorodetzky, Stefan Petrescu, Pamela Sixfin, Elisabeth Small, Alan Umstead, Cathy Umstead, Mary Kathryn Vanosdale, Bruce Weathy and Karen Winklemann – violin

Choir on "For These Times"

- Renita Smith Crittenden, Darlene Hill, Rick Jones, Calvin Settles, Fallon Settles, Ira Wayne Settles, Odessa Settles, Sara Settles, Shirley Settles, Todd Suttles, Elizabeth White and Pierre Womble

== Production ==
- Martina McBride – producer
- John McBride – recording, mixing
- Allen Ditto – recording assistant, mix assistant
- Al Schmitt – additional engineer (3)
- Aaron Walk – assistant engineer (3)
- Richard Dodd – mastering at RichardDodd.com (Nashville, Tennessee)
- Paige Connors – production coordinator
- Carole Ann Mobley – A&R direction
- Judy Forde-Blair – creative production, liner notes
- S. Wade Hunt – art direction, design
- Andrew Southam – photography
- Mary Beth Felts – make-up
- Claudia Fowler – wardrobe stylist
- Earl Cox – hair stylist
- Bruce Allen – management

== Chart performance ==
=== Weekly charts ===
Chart (2007)	Peak position
US Billboard 200	4
US Top Country Albums (Billboard)	2

=== Year-end charts ===
Chart (2007)	Position
US Billboard 200	100
US Top Country Albums (Billboard)	21

=== Singles ===
Year	Single	Peak chart positions					Certifications
Year	Single	US Country	US	US Pop	US AC	CAN Country	Certifications
2006	"Anyway"	5	32	37	14	9	* RIAA: Gold
2007	"How I Feel"	15	108	—	—	28	
2007	"For These Times"	35	—	—	—	—	

== Certifications ==
Certifications for Walking Up Laughing
Region	Certification	Certified units/sales
United States (RIAA)	Gold	500,000^{^}
^{^} Shipments figures based on certification alone.
