= Circus Girl (album) =

Studio album by Sherrié Austin
- Released: November 15, 2011
- Genre: Country
- Length: 45:10
- Label: Circus Girl Records, LLC

Sherrié Austin chronology
Streets of Heaven (2003)	Circus Girl (2011)

Circus Girl is the fifth studio album from Australian country music artist Sherrié Austin and was released independently on November 15, 2011.

== Background ==
The album is portrayed as a group of tales analyzed by a powerful female, about females, and on behalf of females. Austin felts that the work was something her female supporters have been requesting for years.

"The last few years I had been complaining about the fact that there weren’t any females speaking to women above the age of 30, so I started thinking about how I was writing my songs and came up with the idea for “Friday Night Girls" ...I wanted to write a three-minute song with every Sex and the City episode that had ever existed, so I did. I quickly noticed that the women in my audiences loved it and so I switched my songwriting focus for a while to concentrate on that audience, who are my peers, to speak to them,” says Austin.

The final track on the album, "Naughty or Nice", was co-written by Shane Stevens.

== Track listing ==
No.	Title	Writer(s)	Length
1.	"Circus Girl"	Sherrié Austin, Will Rambeaux, Charity Daw	3:16
2.	"Tryin' to Be Me"	Austin, Rodney Clawson, Dan Frizsell	3:32
3.	"I Didn't"	Austin, Rambeaux, Steve Williams	2:52
4.	"If I Was a Man"	Austin, Paul Duncan, Al Kasha	3:09
5.	"Just Want to Love You Tonight"	Austin	3:21
6.	"Get Your Leavin' Done"	Austin	3:46
7.	"He's All Yours"	Austin, Rambeaux, Jaclyn North	3:30
8.	"Bad for Me"	Austin, Rambeaux	3:08
9.	"Friday Night Girls"	Austin	3:49
10.	"Sleep with Me"	Austin, Steven Dale Jones, Lillie Mae Rische	3:41
11.	"That Kind of Happy"	Austin, Mallary Hope, Rambeaux	3:33
12.	"Streets of Heaven" (re-recorded 2011 version)	Austin, Duncan, Kasha	4:29
13.	"Naughty or Nice" (duet with Shane Stevens)	Austin, Shane Stevens, Steven Lee Olsen, Rambeaux	3:13
Total length:			45:10

== Personnel ==
- Sherrié Austin - vocals
- Jim Hyatt - bass
- Joel Key - banjo, acoustic guitar, mandolin
- Wayne Killius - drums
- Mike Rojas - keyboards
- Adam Shoenfeld - electric guitar
- Shane Stevens - backing vocals
- Russell Terrell - backing vocals
