= Three Chords and the Truth (Sara Evans album) =

Studio album by Sara Evans
- Released: July 1, 1997
- Recorded: 1996–1997
- Studio: Mad Dog Studios (Burbank, California); Sound Chamber Studios (North Hollywood, California).
- Genre: Neotraditional country; honky-tonk
- Length: 33:13
- Label: RCA Nashville
- Producer: Pete Anderson

Sara Evans chronology
Three Chords and the Truth (1997)	No Place That Far (1998)

Singles from Three Chords and the Truth
- 1. "True Lies" Released: April 7, 1997; 2. "Three Chords and the Truth" Released: July 6, 1997; 3. "Shame About That" Released: December 2, 1997

Three Chords and the Truth is the debut studio album by American country music artist Sara Evans. The album's title comes from Harlan Howard, a country music songwriter to whom this quote is widely attributed. It also was an improvized lyric in U2's version of the Bob Dylan song "All Along the Watchtower," released on the Rattle and Hum album. The album was released in July 1997 via RCA Records Nashville and it produced three singles: "True Lies", the title track, and "Shame About That". Even though all three singles charted on the U.S. Billboard Hot Country Songs chart, none of them reached the Top 40, making this Evans' only major label album to not produce any Top 40 hits.

== Content ==
This album consists of mostly traditional country. It was hailed by critics as one of the best albums of the year and made the critics top 10 of the year lists for The Washington Post, Billboard, Dallas Morning News, and Country Music People. The album itself has brought prestige and was nominated for many awards such as an Academy of Country Music Nomination for "Top New Female Vocalist." The video for the title track directed by Susan Johnson was nominated for "Country Video of the Year" by the 1998 Music Video Production Association and for "Best New Clip" at the 1997 Billboard Music Video Awards. In addition, Evans was named one of Country America's "Ten To Watch In 1998/Top 10 New Stars Of 1998."

Three of the songs on this album are covers: "Imagine That" was originally recorded by Patsy Cline; "I've Got a Tiger by the Tail" by Buck Owens; and "Walk out Backwards" by Bill Anderson.

== Critical reception ==
Professional ratings
Review scores
Source	Rating
Allmusic	4/5 stars
Entertainment Weekly	B
New Country	3/5 stars

Giving it 3 out of 5 stars, Daniel Cooper of New Country magazine praised the inclusion of material from Melba Montgomery, Buck Owens, and Bill Anderson, and the "honky tonk kick" of Pete Anderson's production. He thought that the album "references the country past without ever sounding unfriendly to 90's country radio" and that Evans had a "clear and strong" voice, but criticized the "abstraction" of the songs that Evans wrote. James Chrispell of Allmusic rated the album 4 out of 5 stars, saying that "This disc rings out with an air of originality helped along by great tunes and solid backup musicianship."

== Track listing ==
No.	Title	Writer(s)	Length
1.	"True Lies"	Al Anderson, Sara Evans, Sharon Rice	2:34
2.	"Shame About That"	Evans, Jamie O'Hara	2:02
3.	"Three Chords and the Truth"	Evans, Ron Harbin, Aimee Mayo	3:59
4.	"If You Ever Want My Lovin'"	Evans, Melba Montgomery, Billy Yates	2:32
5.	"Imagine That"	Justin Tubb	3:20
6.	"Even Now"	Evans, Harbin, Ed Hill	2:24
7.	"I Don't Wanna See the Light"	Evans, Bill Rice, S. Rice	3:32
8.	"I've Got a Tiger By the Tail"	Harlan Howard, Buck Owens	2:24
9.	"Unopened"	Leslie Satcher	3:16
10.	"Walk Out Backwards"	Bill Anderson	2:39
11.	"The Week the River Raged"	John Bettis, Evans, Jim Rushing	3:58
Total length:			33:13

== Personnel ==
From Three Chords and the Truth liner notes.

- Sara Evans – lead vocals, backing vocals
- Skip Edwards – keyboards, acoustic piano, organ, accordion
- Kevin Dukes – acoustic guitar
- Dean Parks – acoustic guitar
- Pete Anderson – electric lead guitars, bajo sexto, handclaps
- Doug Pettibone – electric rhythm guitars
- Bucky Baxter – dobro, mandolin, pedal steel guitar
- Tom Brumley – pedal steel guitar, lap steel guitar
- Scott Joss – fiddle, mandolin
- Taras Prodaniuk – bass
- Jim Christie – drums
- Jimmy Bond – string arrangements
- Murray Adler – conductor
- Beth Anderson – backing vocals
- Tommy Funderburk – backing vocals
- Jim Lauderdale – backing vocals
- Joy Lynn White – backing vocals

== Production ==
- Pete Anderson – producer, arrangements
- Michael Dumas – recording
- Dusty Wakeman – recording
- Judy Clapp – mixing
- Elijah Bradford – additional engineer
- Carlos Castro – additional engineer
- Connie Hill – additional engineer
- James Mcilvery – additional engineer
- Stephen Marcussen – mastering at Precision Mastering (Hollywood, California)
- Barbara Hein – production coordinator
- Buddy Jackson – art direction
- Mary Hamilton – art direction
- Karrine Caulkins – design
- Vern Evans – photography
- Eric Bradley – lyric typist
- Steve Moore – guitar technician
- Gary White – guitar technician
- John Garfield – drum tuning

== Chart performance ==
=== Album ===
Chart (1997)	Peak position
U.S. Billboard Top Country Albums	56

=== Singles ===
Year	Single	Peak positions
Year	Single	US Country
1997	"True Lies"	59
1997	"Three Chords and the Truth"	44
1998	"Shame About That"	48
