= Anyway (Martina McBride song) =

Single by Martina McBride

from the album Waking Up Laughing
- Released: November 20, 2006
- Genre: Country pop, CCM
- Length: 4:40 (Album/Single Version); 4:20 (Video Version)
- Label: RCA Nashville
- Songwriters: Martina McBride, Brad Warren, Brett Warren
- Producer: Martina McBride

Martina McBride singles chronology
"I Still Miss Someone" (2006)	"Anyway" (2006)	"How I Feel" (2007)

"Anyway" is a song by American country music artist Martina McBride, recorded for her ninth studio album Waking Up Laughing (2007). It was the first single of her career that she had a writing credit on, co-writing it with the Warren Brothers, a duo consisting of brothers Brad and Brett Warren. McBride also solely produced the track. "Anyway" is a song about how even though bad things can happen, the narrator sings that she'll do it anyway. RCA Nashville released the song on November 20, 2006, as the lead single from the album.

The song became a success, giving McBride her first country top ten hit since 2004 where it peaked at number five on the Hot Country Songs chart. The song also had crossover success, peaking at number 14 on Adult Contemporary and number 22 on the Hot Christian Songs chart, leading to its peak of number 32 on the Billboard Hot 100. McBride performed the song on American Idol and on four of her tours.

== History ==
The song marks the first time in Martina's career that she has co-written one of her own singles. It is an inspirational song based on a favorite poem of Mother Teresa's, written by Kent Keith, which he originally titled, "The Paradoxical Commandments".

At the 2007 Country Music Association Awards, "Anyway" was nominated for Single of the Year and Song of the Year awards.

"Anyway" was first released on November 6, 2006, where McBride performed the song to promote it. However, the single was released to the iTunes Store February 13, 2007.

Kristy Lee Cook performed the song on the seventh season of American Idol on Top 8 Inspirational Week in 2008.

Lauren Alaina performed the song on the 10th season of American Idol on Top 4 Inspirational Week in 2011. It was considered one of the best versions of the original song.

== Music video ==
A music video was released for the song and was directed by Deaton-Flanigen Productions. In the view, McBride is shown standing in the middle of a street with pedestrians walking past her. These people are then shown standing together on a sidewalk, waiting for a stoplight that turned red. Throughout the video, each individual's thoughts appear as text on the screen. Scenes of McBride performing in a dark room with strings of hanging blue and white lights are also featured. The video ends with the light turning green, and everyone, including McBride, walking away.

== Chart performance ==
"Anyway" was Martina McBride's biggest hit since 2004, reaching a peak of number 5 on the U.S. Billboard Hot Country Songs chart in mid-2007. The song was also a Top 40 hit on the U.S. Billboard Hot 100 and a Top 20 hit on the U.S. Billboard Adult Contemporary Tracks chart.

Chart (2006–2007)	Peak position
Canada Country (Billboard)	9
US Hot Country Songs (Billboard)	5
US Billboard Hot 100	32
US Billboard Pop 100	57
US Adult Contemporary (Billboard)	14
US Billboard Hot Christian Songs	22

=== Year-end charts ===
Chart (2007)	Position
US Country Songs (Billboard)	14
US Adult Contemporary (Billboard)	31

== Personnel ==
- Martina McBride – vocals
- Gordon Mote – acoustic piano
- B. James Lowery – acoustic guitar
- Paul Worley – acoustic guitar, electric guitar
- J. T. Corenflos – electric guitar
- Steve Gibson – electric guitar
- Dann Huff – electric guitar
- Brent Mason – electric guitar
- Dan Dugmore – dobro
- Glenn Worf – bass
- Matt Chamberlain – drums
- David Huff – percussion
- David Campbell – string arrangements and conductor
- The Nashville String Machine – strings

== Certifications ==
Certifications for Anyway
Region	Certification	Certified units/sales
United States (RIAA)	Gold	500,000^{‡}
^{‡} Sales+streaming figures based on certification alone.

== Awards and nominations ==
In 2008, the song was nominated for a Dove Award for Country Recorded Song of the Year at the 39th GMA Dove Awards.

Year	Association	Category	Result
2007	Country Music Association	Music Video of the Year	Nominated
2007	Country Music Association	Single of the Year	Nominated
2007	Country Music Association	Song of the Year	Nominated
2007	BMI	Song of the Year	Nominated
2007	BMI	Most Played Song of the Year	Won
2007	ASCAP	Female Song of the Year	Won
2007	ASCAP	Song of the Year	Won
2008	CMT Video Awards	Female Video	Nominated
