= Beautiful Day in the Cold Cruel World =

Studio album by the Warren Brothers
- Released: October 27, 1998
- Genre: Country
- Length: 45:46
- Label: BNA
- Producer: Chris Farren

The Warren Brothers chronology
Beautiful Day in the Cold Cruel World (1998)	King of Nothing (2001)

Singles from O What a Crying Shame
- 1. "Guilty" Released: August 29, 1998; 2. "Better Man" Released: January 16, 1999; 3. "She Wants to Rock" Released: May 29, 1999

Beautiful Day in the Cold Cruel World is the debut studio album by American country music duo the Warren Brothers. It was released on October 27, 1998, via BNA Records. It includes the singles "Guilty," "Better Man" and "She Wants to Rock," all of which charted in the top 40 on the Billboard Hot Country Songs charts.

Pemberton Roach of AllMusic compared the album's sound to that of "slick, roots-influenced pop artists like Bruce Hornsby, Toad the Wet Sprocket and Glenn Frey" and said that it "avoid[s] any trace of Nashville clichés in favor of honest, straightforward lyrics and energetic, polished playing."

== Track listing ==
No.	Title	Writer(s)	Length
1.	"Guilty"	Dave Berg, Brad Warren, Brett Warren	3:57
2.	"Surviving Emily"	Tom Douglas, Marty McIntosh, Brad Warren, Brett Warren	3:33
3.	"Better Man"	Gary Nicholson, Brad Warren, Brett Warren	4:12
4.	"Greyhound Bus"	Douglas, Brad Warren, Brett Warren	3:52
5.	"The Enemy"	Berg, Brad Warren, Brett Warren	3:14
6.	"Loneliest Girl in the World"	Douglas, Brad Warren, Brett Warren	3:31
7.	"Cold Cruel World"	Douglas, Brad Warren, Brett Warren	4:33
8.	"She Wants to Rock"	Rob Stoney, Brad Warren, Brett Warren	2:52
9.	"I Tried"	James House, Brad Warren, Brett Warren	3:37
10.	"The One I Can't Live Without"	Brad Warren, Brett Warren	4:01
11.	"Just Another Sad Song"	Brad Warren, Brett Warren	3:44
12.	"Nowhere Fast"	Douglas, Brad Warren, Brett Warren	4:40

== Personnel ==
Compiled from liner notes.

=== The Warren Brothers ===
- Brad Warren — harmony vocals, acoustic guitar, electric guitar
- Brett Warren — lead vocals, acoustic guitar, harmonica, mandolin

=== Additional musicians ===
- Dave Berg, Georgia Middleman, Marty McIntosh, and LeAnn Phelan — gang vocals on "Guilty"
- Bruce Bouton — pedal steel guitar, lap steel guitar
- Chris Farren — mandolin on "The Enemy" and "Just Another Sad Song"; keyboards on "Greyhound Bus" and "The Loneliest Girl in the World"
- Larry Franklin — fiddle
- John Hobbs — piano on "Greyhound Bus", "The One I Can't Live Without", and "Nowhere Fast"; accordion on "Nowhere Fast"
- Jeannie Hoeft — percussion
- Michael McDonald — harmony vocals on "Better Man"
- Marty McIntosh — bass guitar
- Greg Morrow — drums
- Rob Stoney — Hammond B-3 organ, piano
- The Warren Kids Family Choir — choir singing "He's Got the Whole World in His Hands" on "Cold Cruel World"

=== Technical ===
- Don Cobb — digital editing
- Chris Farren — production
- Steve Marcantonio — recording, overdubbing, mixing
- Denny Purcell — mastering

== Chart performance ==
Chart (1998)	Peak position
U.S. Billboard Top Country Albums	73
