= No Place That Far =

Studio album by Sara Evans
- Released: October 27, 1998
- Recorded: 1998
- Studio: Emerald Sound Studios and Starstruck Studios (Nashville, Tennessee)
- Genre: Country
- Length: 37:05
- Label: RCA Nashville
- Producer: Buddy Cannon; Norro Wilson

Sara Evans chronology
Three Chords and the Truth (1997)	No Place That Far (1998)	Born to Fly (2000)

Singles from No Place That Far
- 1. "Cryin' Game" Released: June 23, 1998; 2. "No Place That Far" Released: September 25, 1998; 3. "Fool, I'm a Woman" Released: March 1999

Professional ratings
Review scores
Source	Rating
Allmusic	4/5 stars

No Place That Far is the second studio album by American country music artist Sara Evans. It was released in October 1998 via RCA Records Nashville. The album's first single, "Cryin' Game", peaked at number 56 on the US Billboard Hot Country Singles and Tracks chart; this single also included a non-album track entitled "Wait a Minute". The second single, its title track, became Evans' first number one hit on the US country charts. The third and final single from the album, "Fool, I'm a Woman" reached number 32. The album was certified gold by the Recording Industry Association of America (RIAA) for US sales of 500,000 copies.

The international version of No Place That Far included remixes of "Cryin' Game", "Fool, I'm a Woman", and "No Place That Far"; the latter excluded the backing vocals by Vince Gill which were featured on the American version. It also included two extra tracks, a remix of "Almost New" from the Clay Pigeons soundtrack and a cover of "I Only Have Eyes for You".

== Track listing ==
American version
No.	Title	Writer(s)	Length
1.	"The Great Unknown"	Phil Barnhart; Sara Evans; James House	3:53
2.	"Cryin' Game"	Jamie O'Hara	2:54
3.	"No Place That Far"	Evans; Tony Martin; Tom Shapiro	3:37
4.	"I Thought I'd See Your Face Again"	Marv Green; Rick Orozco	3:28
5.	"Fool, I'm a Woman"	Evans; Matraca Berg	3:06
6.	"Time Won't Tell"	Beth Nielsen Chapman	3:53
7.	"The Knot Comes Untied"	Ron Harbin; Ed Hill; Sam Hogin	3:42
8.	"Love, Don't Be a Stranger"	Bill Rice; Sharon Rice	3:16
9.	"These Days"	Evans; Billy Yates	3:14
10.	"Cupid"	Keith Gattis; Kostas	3:03
11.	"There's Only One"	Evans; Leslie Satcher	2:58
Total length:			37:05

International version
No.	Title	Writer(s)	Length
1.	"Cryin' Game" (International remix)	O'Hara	2:55
2.	"No Place That Far" (International remix)	Evans; Martin; Shapiro	3:24
3.	"Almost New" (International remix)	John Keller; Tonio K	4:02
4.	"Fool, I'm a Woman" (International remix)	Berg; Evans	3:06
5.	"I Thought I'd See Your Face Again"	Green; Orozco	3:28
6.	"I Only Have Eyes for You"	Harry Warren; Al Dubin	3:36
7.	"Time Won't Tell"	Chapman	3:53
8.	"These Days"	Evans; Yates	3:14
9.	"The Knot Comes Untied"	Harbin; Hill; Hogin	3:42
10.	"Love, Don't Be a Stranger"	B. Rice; S. Rice	3:16
11.	"Cupid"	Gattis; Kostas	3:03
12.	"The Great Unknown"	Barnhart; Evans; House	3:53
13.	"There's Only One"	Evans; Satcher	2:58

== Personnel ==
From No Place That Far liner notes.

- Sara Evans – lead vocals

Musicians

- John Hobbs – acoustic piano, Hammond B3 organ, synthesizers
- Randy McCormick – synthesizers
- Larry Byrom – acoustic guitar
- Jim Hurst – acoustic guitar
- B. James Lowry – acoustic guitar, gut-string guitar
- J.T. Corenflos – electric guitars, electric 12-string guitar
- Billy Sanford – electric guitars
- Sonny Garrish – steel guitar, dobro
- Larry Franklin – fiddle, mandolin
- Chris Carmichael – fiddle
- Larry Paxton – bass, six-string bass
- Eddie Bayers – drums, tambourine
- Lonnie Wilson – drums
- Terry McMillan – percussion

Background vocalists

- Ashley Evans
- Sara Evans
- Vince Gill
- Jim Hurst
- George Jones
- Alison Krauss
- Lesley Lyons
- Larry Marrs
- Liana Manis
- Martina McBride
- Jamie O'Hara
- Dan Tyminski
- Dennis Wilson
- Curtis Young

== Production ==
- Buddy Cannon – producer
- Norro Wilson – producer
- Billy Sherrill – recording, additional recording
- Grahame Smith – recording assistant, additional recording assistant, digital editing
- Scott McCutcheon – recording assistant
- J.R. Rodriguez – recording assistant
- Kelly Schoenfeld – additional recording assistant
- Brian Tankersley – mixing
- Sandy Jenkins – mix assistant
- Hank Williams – mastering
- Shannon Finnegan – production coordinator
- Mary Hamilton – art direction
- Susan Eaddy – art direction
- Julie Wance – design
- Andrew Eccles – photography
- Mary Beth Felts – hair, make-up
- Jennifer Kemp – stylist
- Brenner Van Meter – management
- Kip Krones – management

Studios

- Additional recording at The Music Mill and Sound Stage Studios (Nashville, Tennessee).
- Mixed at Seventeen Grand Recording (Nashville, Tennessee).
- Edited at Budro Music Repair Shop (Nashville, Tennessee).
- Mastered at MasterMix (Nashville, Tennessee).

== Chart performance ==
=== Weekly charts ===
Chart (1998)	Peak position
Canadian Country Albums (RPM)	4
US Billboard 200	116
US Top Country Albums (Billboard)	11
US Heatseekers Albums (Billboard)	1

=== Year-end charts ===
Chart (1999)	Position
US Top Country Albums (Billboard)	42

=== Singles ===
Year	Single	Peak chart positions		
Year	Single	US Country	US	CAN Country
1998	"Cryin' Game"	56	—	82
1998	"No Place That Far"	1	37	4
1999	"Fool, I'm a Woman"	32	—	33
"—" denotes releases that did not chart

== Certifications ==
Region	Certification
United States (RIAA)	Gold
