= Cryin' Game =

Single by Sara Evans

from the album No Place That Far
- B-side: "Wait a Minute"
- Released: June 23, 1998
- Recorded: March 1998
- Studio: Emerald Sound Studios
- Genre: Country; Neotraditional country
- Length: 2:53
- Label: RCA Nashville
- Songwriter: Jamie O'Hara
- Producers: Buddy Cannon; Norro Wilson

Sara Evans singles chronology
| "Shame About That" (1997) | "Cryin' Game" (1998) | "No Place That Far" (1998) |

"Cryin' Game" is a song written by Jamie O'Hara. It was originally recorded by American country artist Sara Evans and released as the lead single off her second studio album, No Place That Far. The song became a minor hit on the Billboard country chart in 1998. "Cryin' Game" received positive reviews from critics and writers alike.

== Background ==
"Cryin' Game" was composed by Jamie O'Hara. Previously O'Hara had written Evans's single "Shame About That," which was released in 1997. In reviewing her second studio album, Allmusic's Thom Jurek described "Cryin' Game" as an upbeat track that displayed a "country pub rock shuffle." The song was recorded in March 1998 at Emerald Sound Studios, which was located in Nashville, Tennessee. The song's eventual B-side, "Wait a Minute," was also cut during the same recording session. The sessions were co-produced by Buddy Cannon and Norro Wilson. It was Evans's first experience recording at the studio and her first session with both producers. Cannon and Wilson would also co-produce her 1998 studio album.

== Critical reception ==
Upon its release, "Cryin' Game" received a positive response from writers and critics. In July 1998, Billboard reviewed the single, praising its traditional production and Evans's vocal stylings. Reviewers also noted that the song was "strong" lyrically and may lead to Evans reaching commercial success: "The song is strong. Her performance is stunning. Here's hoping this is the one." Allmusic's Thom Jurek also praised the song when reviewing Evans's second album. Jurek compared its sound and style to that of early work by Rosanne Cash. He also made comparisons to the songwriting of Hank DeVito in his commentary: "It was a place where Evans' voice was left pretty much untreated and allowed to display its natural range and emotional depth."

== Release and chart performance ==
"Cryin' Game" was released as a single to country radio on June 23, 1998, via RCA Nashville. It Evans's fourth single release in her career. It was issued as both a CD single and a vinyl single. It included a B-side, "Wait a Minute." The song spent ten weeks on the Billboard Hot Country Songs chart in the summer of 1998. In August, it reached a peak of 56. The single became Evans's fourth charting song on the Billboard country chart. The single also was her first to reach the Canada RPM Country Songs chart, peaking at number 82. "Cryin' Game" was later released on Evans's second studio album, No Place That Far. Despite only being a minor country hit, Evans would go on to have a series of major hits following "Cryin' Game." The title track off of No Place That Far would reach number one on the country charts in 1998. Evans would then continue having major hits through the next decade, including four more number one singles.

== Track listing ==
CD single, 7" vinyl single

- "Cryin' Game" – 2:53
- "Wait a Minute" – 2:43

== Charts ==
| Chart (1998) | Peak position |
|---|---|
| Canada Country Songs (RPM) | 82 |
| US Hot Country Songs (Billboard) | 56 |
