= Well-Deserved Obscurity =

Studio album by The Warren Brothers
- Released: April 6, 2004
- Genre: Country
- Length: 51:32
- Label: 429
- Producer: The Warren Brothers

The Warren Brothers chronology
King of Nothing (2000)	Well-Deserved Obscurity (2004)	Barely Famous Hits (2005)

Well-Deserved Obscurity is the third studio album by the American country music duo The Warren Brothers. It was released in 2004 via 429 Records. The album followed two charting singles on BNA Records: "Hey Mr. President" and "Break the Record," which respectively reached #28 and #54 on the Billboard Hot Country Songs charts. "Sell a Lot of Beer" was the first single from Well-Deserved Obscurity, reaching #51. It was followed by "Change" which did not chart.

Jason MacNeil of Allmusic gave the album three-and-a-half stars out of five, saying that it showed the duo's rock and roots influences.

== Track listing ==
1. "Comeback" (Brad Warren, Brett Warren) - 4:05
2. "Between the River and Me" (Brett Beavers, Brad Warren, Brett Warren) - 3:46
3. "Change" (Brad Warren, Brett Warren) - 2:53
4. "Southern Baptist Heartbreak" (Danny Tate, Brad Warren, Brett Warren) - 3:39
5. "Goodbye to Neverland" (Marty McIntosh, Brad Warren, Brett Warren) - 4:19
6. "Pretty" (McIntosh, Brad Warren, Brett Warren) - 3:38
7. "Sell a Lot of Beer" (Bill Anderson, Brad Warren, Brett Warren) - 4:03
8. "Trouble Is" (Tate, Brad Warren, Brett Warren) - 4:14
9. "Quarter to Three" (Rob Stoney, Brad Warren, Brett Warren) - 4:21
10. "Little Savior of Brooklyn" (McIntosh, Brad Warren, Brett Warren) - 3:49
11. "Runnin' Out of Heroes" (McIntosh, Brad Warren, Brett Warren) - 3:55
12. "Liquid Confidence" (Kevin Bowe, Brad Warren, Brett Warren) - 4:33
13. "The Lucky" (McIntosh, Brad Warren, Brett Warren) - 4:17
