= Three Chords and the Truth (song) =

1997 song performed by Sara Evans

Single by Sara Evans

from the album Three Chords and the Truth
- B-side: "The Week the River Raged"
- Released: July 6, 1997
- Recorded: February 1997
- Studio: Mag Dog Studio, Burbank, California, U.S.
- Genre: Country
- Length: 3:59
- Label: RCA Nashville
- Songwriter(s): Sara Evans; Ron Harbin; Aimee Mayo
- Producer(s): Pete Anderson

Sara Evans singles chronology
"True Lies" (1997)	"Three Chords and the Truth" (1997)	"Shame About That" (1998)

"Three Chords and the Truth" is a song co-written and recorded by American country music artist Sara Evans. It was released in July 1997 as the second single from Evans' debut album of the same name in July 1997. Despite its minor success on the Billboard country chart, it was critically acclaimed for its retro-themed production. Since its release, "Three Chords and the Truth" has been identified with Evans' early career persona as a traditionally-oriented country music vocalist.

== Content ==
"Three Chords and the Truth" was co-written by Sara Evans, Ron Harbin, and Aimee Mayo. The latter songwriter would later be a frequent collaborator with Evans. The song's plot focuses on lost love and the narrator reconciling with her partner. The song references the famous description of country music by Harlan Howard. It was recorded at the Mag Dog Studio in Burbank, California, United States in February 1997. The song is one of the few tracks in Evans' career that has been recorded outside of Nashville, Tennessee. It was produced by Pete Anderson, whose intention was to try to give the song (and the future album) a traditionally-themed production.

== Critical reception ==
"Three Chords and the Truth" received praise and acclaim from various music critics. James Crispell of Allmusic called the track "a must for new country fans". Crispell also stated that Pete Anderson's production allowed Evans' voice an "opportunity to shine". Kathy Coleman from About.com called the song "fantastic" and praised Evans' vocal styling, stating, "her conviction apparently obvious in every vocal phrasing, in every sentimental weeping tone. She is country, sweet and sincere; she is country, strong and sorrowful." Daniel Cooper of New Country magazine was less favorable, citing it as an example of Evans' "fondness for abstraction", as he did not understand what "the truth" was referring to: "What truth? That her cheating heart will make her weep? That Rubber Duckie is the one?"

== Music video ==
The music video for "Three Chords and the Truth" was released in 1997 and was ranked among Billboard's "Most-Played Video Clips" in August 1997. It was nominated by the Music Video Production Association for Country Video of the Year, according to Billboard. On CMT's televised list of the 100 Greatest Videos in 2008, "Three Chords and the Truth" was ranked at number 71.

== Chart performance ==
"Three Chords and the Truth" was released on July 6, 1997, via RCA Nashville. It was the second single issued from Evans' debut album of the same name. The song reached a peak of 44 on the Billboard Hot Country Singles & Tracks chart, becoming only a minor hit. The song did however become Evans' highest-charting single from her debut album, as its other releases reached lower positions. In an interview with BuzzFeed in 2014, Evans said that although the song did not gain major success, she learned a lot from the experience.

Chart performance for "Three Chords and the Truth"
Chart (1997)	Peak position
US Hot Country Songs (Billboard)	44

== Personnel ==
Credits adapted from AllMusic.

- Murray Adler – conductor
- Beth Andersen – background vocals
- Jimmy Bond – string arrangements
- Jim Christie – drums
- Kevin Dukes – acoustic guitar
- Sara Evans – lead vocals, background vocals
- Tommy Funderburk – background vocals
- Scott Joss – fiddle
- Jim Lauderdale – background vocals
- Dean Parks – acoustic guitar
- Doug Pettibone – electric guitar
- Taras Prodaniuk – bass guitar
- Joy Lynn White – background vocals
