= King of Nothing =

Studio album by The Warren Brothers
- Released: September 12, 2000
- Genre: Country
- Label: BNA
- Producer: Chris Farren; Jay Joyce; Brad Warren; Brett Warren

The Warren Brothers chronology
Beautiful Day in the Cold Cruel World (1998)	King of Nothing (2000)	Well-Deserved Obscurity (2003)

Singles from King of Nothing
- 1. "That's the Beat of a Heart" Released: March 2000; 2. "Move On" Released: October 14, 2000; 3. "Where Does It Hurt" Released: June 2, 2001

King of Nothing is the second studio album by American country music duo The Warren Brothers. It was released in September 2000 via BNA Records. The album includes the singles "That's the Beat of a Heart," "Move On" and "Where Does It Hurt." "That's the Beat of a Heart" features guest vocals from Sara Evans, and was previously released on the soundtrack to the 2000 film Where the Heart Is. "Move On" is the brothers' highest-peaking single, reaching number 17 on the Billboard Hot Country Songs charts.

The Warren Brothers produced the album with Chris Farren, except for the title track, which was produced by Jay Joyce.

== Track listing ==
No.	Title	Writer(s)	Length
1.	"Strange"	Brett James, Troy Verges	3:48
2.	"Waiting for the Light to Change"	Benmont Tench, Brad Warren, Brett Warren	4:07
3.	"Where Does It Hurt"	Tom Douglas, Brad Warren, Brett Warren	4:04
4.	"Superstar"	Marty McIntosh, Brad Warren, Brett Warren	4:44
5.	"Move On"	Brad Warren, Brett Warren, Danny Wilde	3:15
6.	"No Place to Go"	Marc Jordan, Brad Warren, Brett Warren	3:29
7.	"Do Ya"	Bob DiPiero, Brad Warren, Brett Warren	3:44
8.	"What We Can't Have"	Brad Warren, Brett Warren	4:09
9.	"King of Nothing"	James House, Brad Warren, Brett Warren	4:28
10.	"It Ain't Me"	Rob Stoney, Brad Warren, Brett Warren	3:23
11.	"That's the Beat of a Heart" (featuring Sara Evans)	Tena Clark, Tim Heintz	3:36

== Personnel ==
Compiled from liner notes.

=== Musicians ===
The Warren Brothers

- Brad Warren — harmony vocals, electric guitar, acoustic guitar
- Brett Warren — lead vocals, acoustic guitar, harmonica, mandolin, piano

The Warren Brothers' band

- Angelo Collura — drums, percussion
- Mike Holder — pedal steel guitar, lap steel guitar, Dobro, background vocals
- Marty McIntosh — bass guitar, background vocals
- Rob Stoney — piano, Hammond B-3 organ, Wurlitzer electric piano

Additional musicians

- Bruce Bouton — pedal steel guitar, lap steel guitar
- Stephen E. Byam — pedal steel guitar, lap steel guitar
- Sara Evans — background vocals on "That's the Beat of a Heart"
- Chris Farren — background vocals
- Larry Franklin — fiddle
- Tony Harrell — keyboards, synthesizer strings
- John Hobbs — keyboards
- Jennie Hoeft — drums
- Chris McHugh — drums, percussion
- Greg Morrow — drums, percussion
- LeAnn Phelan — background vocals
- Nashville String Machine — strings
- Steve Nathan — synthesizer strings
- Darrell Scott — mandolin
- Benmont Tench — keyboards

=== Technical ===
- Richard Dodd — mixing ("King of Nothing" only)
- Chris Farren — production (except "King of Nothing")
- Ben Fowler — mixing (all tracks except "King of Nothing")
- Jay Joyce — production ("King of Nothing" only)
- Chris Lord-Alge — mixing (except "That's the Beat of a Heart")
- Steve Marcantonio — recording (except "King of Nothing"), mixing (except "That's the Beat of a Heart")
- Denny Purcell — mastering
- Giles Reaves — recording ("King of Nothing" only)
- The Warren Brothers — production (except "King of Nothing")

== Chart performance ==
Chart (2000)	Peak position
U.S. Top Country Albums	34
U.S. Top Heatseekers	43
