= Love in the Real World =

Studio album by Sherrié Austin
- Released: August 10, 1999
- Genre: Country
- Length: 42:18
- Label: Arista Nashville
- Producers: Will Rambeaux, Ed Seay

Sherrié Austin chronology
Words (1997)	Love in the Real World (1999)	Followin' a Feelin' (2001)

Singles from Love in the Real World
- 1. "Never Been Kissed" Released: May 10, 1999; 2. "Little Bird" Released: October 18, 1999

Love in the Real World is the second studio album by Australian country music artist Sherrié Austin. It was released in 1999 by Arista Nashville and peaked at #14 on the Billboard Top Country Albums chart. The album includes the singles "Never Been Kissed" and "Little Bird."

== Track listing ==
No.	Title	Writer(s)	Length
1.	"Never Been Kissed"	Sherrié Austin, Greg Barnhill, Will Rambeaux	3:36
2.	"Good Love Comin' On"	Austin, Rambeaux, Tom Snow	3:23
3.	"Little Bird"	Austin, Christopher Davis, Rambeaux	2:35
4.	"That's No Way to Break a Heart"	Austin, Rambeaux	3:21
5.	"Sarah"	Austin, Jaime Kyle, Rambeaux	3:04
6.	"All the Love a Heart Can Hold"	Austin, Rambeaux, Troy Verges	3:49
7.	"Dreaming Out Loud"	Austin, Kyle, Rambeaux	3:47
8.	"Heart to Heart"	Austin, Davis, Rambeaux	3:59
9.	"Love in the Real World"	Austin, Davis, Rambeaux	3:08
10.	"Heart Hold On"	Austin, Steve Mandile	4:08
11.	"All That Matters"	Austin	3:39
12.	"Wish"	Billy Falcon	3:49

== Personnel ==
As listed in liner notes.

- Eddie Bayers – drums, percussion
- Pat Buchanan – electric guitar, 12-string guitar
- Joe Chemay – bass guitar
- John Christopher Davis – background vocals
- Dan Dugmore – pedal steel guitar, lap steel guitar, acoustic guitar, electric guitar, 12-string guitar
- Connie Ellisor – violin
- Larry Franklin – fiddle
- Paul Franklin – pedal steel guitar, Dobro
- John Hobbs – piano, Hammond B-3 organ, synthesizer
- Dann Huff – electric guitar
- Paul Leim – drums
- Joey Miskulin – accordion
- Gary Morse – pedal steel guitar
- Russ Pahl – pedal steel guitar
- Kim Parent – background vocals
- Will Rambeaux – acoustic guitar
- Tom Roady – percussion
- Brent Rowan – electric guitar, acoustic guitar, electric sitar
- John Wesley Ryles – background vocals
- Darrell Scott – acoustic guitar, mandolin, bouzouki
- Eric Silver – mandolin
- Biff Watson – acoustic guitar, high-strung guitar, GP-8
- Dennis Wilson – background vocals

== Chart performance ==
Chart (1999)	Peak position
U.S. Billboard Top Country Albums	14
U.S. Billboard 200	150
U.S. Billboard Top Heatseekers	8
