= Fool, I'm a Woman =

Single by Sara Evans

from the album No Place That Far
- B-side: "No Place That Far"
- Released: April 3, 1999
- Genre: Country
- Length: 3:06
- Label: RCA Nashville
- Songwriters: Sara Evans, Matraca Berg
- Producers: Buddy Cannon, Norro Wilson

Sara Evans singles chronology
"No Place That Far" (1998)	"Fool, I'm a Woman" (1999)	"That's the Beat of a Heart" (2000)

"Fool, I'm a Woman" is a song co-written and recorded by American country music singer Sara Evans. It was released in April 1999 as the third single from her album No Place That Far. The song reached No. 32 on the Billboard Hot Country Singles & Tracks chart. Evans wrote the song with Matraca Berg, and Martina McBride provides backing vocals.

== Background ==
"Fool, I'm a Woman" was included as a track on the CMT Girls' Night Out compilation album a year later. Evans performed the song on the CMT Girls' Night Out special which featured vocal accompaniment from McBride, Lorrie Morgan, and Mindy McCready. This version was used in the song's music video.

== Critical reception ==
Thom Jurek of Allmusic wrote that "'Fool, I'm a Woman', with its sprightly mandolins, ringing electric guitars, and crackling snare drum, is another of those crossover tunes that landed as a single".

== Chart performance ==
Chart (1999)	Peak position
US Hot Country Songs (Billboard)	32
Canadian RPM Country Tracks	33
