= No Place That Far (song) =

1998 song performed by Sara Evans

Single by Sara Evans

from the album No Place That Far
- B-side: "Cryin' Game"
- Released: September 28, 1998
- Genre: Country
- Length: 3:37
- Label: RCA Nashville
- Songwriters: Sara Evans; Tony Martin; Tom Shapiro
- Producers: Norro Wilson; Buddy Cannon

Sara Evans singles chronology
"Cryin' Game" (1998)	"No Place That Far" (1998)	"Fool, I'm a Woman" (1999)

Music video
- "No Place That Far" at CMT.com

"No Place That Far" is a song co-written and recorded by American country music singer Sara Evans. It was released in September 1998 as the second single and title track from her album of the same name. It was her first Top 40 single on the Hot Country Songs chart, as well as her first number one hit. An acoustic version of "No Place That Far" without backing vocals was included on Evans' compilation album Feels Like Home. Evans wrote this song with Tom Shapiro and Tony Martin.

== Content ==
"No Place That Far" begins in the key of C major, and modulates upward to D major on the last chorus. Evans' vocals range from G_{3} to B_{4}. Vince Gill provides backing vocals.

In it, the female narrator states that she will do anything to keep her lover near her.

== Critical reception ==
Deborah Evans Price, of Billboard magazine reviewed the song favorably, calling it an "evocative ballad that should help her win long-overdue acceptance at country radio." She goes on to say that Evans voice has a "richness and vibrancy that soar powerfully above the fiddle and piano on the lustrous chorus." Price calls the lyric "memorable, poignant - emotional but not mushy."

== Music video ==
A music video was released for the song directed by Thom Oliphant. The video takes place in a forest with Evans dressed in a black and red dress with Vince Gill behind her as they perform the song.

== Chart performance ==
The song debuted at number 69 on the US Billboard Hot Country Singles & Tracks for the week of October 3, 1998. "No Place That Far" spent thirty weeks on the Billboard Hot Country Singles & Tracks charts, peaking at number one on the chart dated for the week ending March 6, 1999. The song was Evans' first Top 40 country hit on both the country and Billboard Hot 100 charts, peaking at 37 on the latter.

Chart (1998–1999)	Peak position
Canada Country Singles (RPM)	4
US Billboard Hot 100	37
US Hot Country Songs (Billboard)	1

=== Year-end charts ===
Chart (1999)	Position
Canada Country Tracks (RPM)	29
US Country Songs (Billboard)	26

== Other cover versions ==
- In 2000, the song was recorded by Westlife on their album Coast to Coast.
