= For These Times =

Single by Martina McBride

from the album Waking Up Laughing
- Released: October 22, 2007
- Genre: Country
- Length: 4:16
- Label: RCA Nashville
- Songwriter(s): Leslie Satcher
- Producer(s): Martina McBride

Martina McBride singles chronology
"How I Feel" (2007)	"For These Times" (2007)	"Ride" (2008)

"For These Times" is a song recorded and produced by American country music artist Martina McBride. The song was written by Leslie Satcher, who had also written her 2001 single "When God-Fearin' Women Get the Blues". RCA Nashville Records added the song to country radio on October 22, 2007, as the third and final single from McBride's ninth studio album Waking Up Laughing (2007).

== Background and content ==
"For These Times" was inspired by former Republican senator Rick Santorum, who was defeated in 2006, and his daughter. When his daughter began to cry at his loss, the cameras focused on her, inspiring Leslie Satcher to write the song. It was also inspired by her Pastor, who stated "For these times in which we live, you are going to need this book." referring to the Bible.

== Music video ==
The music video for "For These Times" was shot in New York City and was directed by Sam Erickson.

== Charts ==
Chart (2007–2008)	Peak position
US Hot Country Songs (Billboard)	35
