= Words (Sherrié Austin album) =

Studio album by Sherrié Austin
- Released: 15 July 1997
- Genre: Country
- Length: 35:20
- Label: Arista Nashville
- Producer: Will Rambeaux

Sherrié Austin chronology
Words (1997)	Love in the Real World (1999)

Singles from Words
- 1. "Lucky in Love" Released: 12 May 1997; 2. "One Solitary Tear" Released: 8 September 1997; 3. "Tenderly" Released: 1997; 4. "Put Your Heart into It" Released: 26 January 1998; 5. "Innocent Man" Released: 6 July 1998

Professional ratings
Review scores
Source	Rating
Allmusic	4/5 stars

Words is the debut studio album by Australian country music singer Sherrié Austin. The album was released on 15 July 1997 via Arista Nashville. She was previously signed to Interscope Records as the duo of Colourhaus, which charted a Top 50 single on the Billboard Hot 100.

From the album, four singles were released, however, only two made the Top 40 of the Hot Country Singles & Tracks (now Hot Country Songs) chart. "Lucky in Love", "One Solitary Tear", "Put Your Heart into It", and "Innocent Man" were released, charting to #34, #41, #34, and #71, respectively.

== Track listing ==
No.	Title	Writer(s)	Length
1.	"Lucky in Love"	Sherrié Austin, Will Rambeaux, Blair Daly	3:27
2.	"Innocent Man"	Kent Agee, Rambeaux	3:27
3.	"One Solitary Tear"	Austin, Steve Mandile	4:00
4.	"Trouble in Paradise"	Richard "Spady" Brannan, Pound Lamb	3:58
5.	"That's No Way to Break a Heart"	Austin, Rambeaux	3:22
6.	"I Want to Fall in Love (So Hard It Hurts)"	Austin, John Paul Daniel, Shawna Harrington-Burkhart	3:15
7.	"Words"	Austin, Rambeaux	3:44
8.	"Tenderly"	Kevin Fisher	2:55
9.	"Put Your Heart into It"	Austin, Rambeaux	2:35
10.	"You Keep on Lovin' Me"	Austin	4:34

== Personnel ==
- Pat Buchanan – electric guitar
- Joe Chemay – bass
- Blair Daly – percussion
- Diana DeWitt – backing vocals
- Dan Dugmore – steel guitar
- Larry Franklin – fiddle
- Paul Franklin – steel guitar
- John Hobbs – keyboards
- Dann Huff – electric guitar
- Mary Ann Kennedy – backing vocals
- Paul Leim – drums
- Anthony Martin – keyboards
- Donna McElroy – backing vocals
- Kim Parent – backing vocals
- Will Rambeaux – acoustic guitar
- Michael Rhodes – bass
- Tom Roady – percussion
- Pam Rose – backing vocals
- John Wesley Ryles – backing vocals
- Hank Singer – fiddle
- Biff Watson – acoustic guitar
- Dennis Wilson – backing vocals

== Chart performance ==
Chart (1997)	Peak position
U.S. Billboard Top Country Albums	41
U.S. Billboard Top Heatseekers	35
