= How I Feel (Martina McBride song) =

Single by Martina McBride

from the album Waking Up Laughing
- Released: May 7, 2007
- Genre: Country
- Length: 3:49 (album version); 3:31 (radio edit)
- Label: RCA Nashville
- Songwriters: Martina McBride; Chris Lindsey; Aimee Mayo; Brad Warren; Brett Warren
- Producer: Martina McBride

Martina McBride singles chronology
"Anyway" (2006)	"How I Feel" (2007)	"For These Times" (2007)

"How I Feel" is a song co-written, produced, and recorded by American country music artist Martina McBride. McBride wrote the single with Aimee Mayo, Chris Lindsey, Brad Warren, and Brett Warren. It was released on May 7, 2007 as the second single from her ninth studio album Waking Up Laughing (2007). It reached number 15 on the US Hot Country Songs chart and number 28 on Canada Country.

== Music video ==
A live video of McBride performing the song at the 2007 CMA Music Fest was released to GAC and CMT in August 2007.

== Chart performance ==
Chart (2007)	Peak position
Canada Country (Billboard)	28
US Hot Country Songs (Billboard)	15
US Bubbling Under Hot 100 (Billboard)	8
