= Streets of Heaven (song) =

Single by Sherrié Austin

from the album Streets of Heaven
- Released: June 2, 2003
- Genre: Country
- Length: 4:29
- Label: Broken Bow
- Songwriters: Sherrié Austin; Paul Duncan; Al Kasha
- Producers: Jeff Balding; Dann Huff

Sherrié Austin singles chronology
"In the Meantime" (2002)	"Streets of Heaven" (2003)	"Drivin' into the Sun" (2004)

"Streets of Heaven" is a song by Australian country music artist Sherrié Austin. The track was penned by Austin, Paul Duncan, and Al Kasha and produced by Jeff Balding and Dann Huff. The song was released on June 2, 2003, as the lead single to Austin's fourth studio album of the same name via Broken Bow Records, her first single release under the label.

== Content ==
The song relates the latest in a mother's series of 2 AM hospital room prayers for her seriously ill and dying seven-year-old daughter. The title refers to the last line in each chorus, as well as the end of the song, wherein she makes the request, "So if you take her with you today, will you make sure she looks both ways, And would you hold her hand when she crosses the streets of Heaven."

== Critical reception ==
The song received a favorable review from Ray Waddell of Billboard, who wrote that it is "the kind of tear-jerker that a country audience would absolutely embrace if given half a chance."

== Commercial performance ==
"Streets of Heaven" debuted at number 54 on the US Billboard Hot Country Songs chart on June 14, 2003. The track entered the top-forty of the chart the week of July 19, 2003, at number 37, becoming Austin's first top-forty charting single since "Never Been Kissed" reached number 29 back in 1999. In its 11th week on the chart, it rose to number 28, surpassing "Never Been Kissed" to become her highest-charting single to date. On November 8, 2003, it cracked the top-20, becoming her first entry. The track reached its peak position of number 18 on November 29, 2003. It spent 26 weeks in total. On Radio & Records's Country chart, the song reached number 15 and number 11 on the Country Indicator chart.

== Music video ==
A music video was filmed for the song. It exclusively debuted to Great American Country on August 17, 2003.

== Charts ==
=== Weekly charts ===
Weekly chart performance for "Streets of Heaven"
Chart (2003)	Peak position
US Bubbling Under Hot 100 (Billboard)	13
US Hot Country Songs (Billboard)	18
US Country Top 50 (Radio & Records)	15

=== Year-end charts ===
Year-end chart performance for "Streets of Heaven"
Chart (2003)	Position
US Country Songs (Billboard)	62
US Country (Radio & Records)	68
