= True Lies (song) =

Single by Sara Evans

from the album Three Chords and the Truth
- B-side: "The Week the River Raged"
- Released: March 10, 1997
- Studio: Mad Dog Studios; Burbank, California
- Genre: Country; Neotraditional country
- Length: 2:34
- Label: RCA Nashville
- Songwriter(s): Al Anderson; Sara Evans; Sharon Rice
- Producer(s): Pete Anderson

Sara Evans singles chronology
"True Lies" (1997)	"Three Chords and the Truth" (1997)

"True Lies" is a song written by Al Anderson, Sara Evans and Sharon Rice, and recorded by Evans as her debut single. Released in 1997, "True Lies" became a minor hit on the Billboard country chart and was later included on Evans' debut studio album, Three Chords and the Truth. The song received positive reviews from critics.

== Background ==
"True Lies" was co-written by Sara Evans, along with songwriters Al Anderson and Sharon Rice. The song was recorded at Mad Dog Studios, which was located in Burbank, California. The session was produced by Pete Anderson, who also produced Evans's first studio album. Evan's next two hits would also be produced by Anderson. The album's other songs were recorded during the same sessions, including its title track and the single "Shame About That". The Washington Post described "True Lies" as a ballad filled with "heartache" that has an "outlook for love isn't nearly so bleak".

== Critical reception ==
"True Lies" received positive reviews from music writers and critics. Mike Joyce of The Washington Post found similarities between the track and older country ballads by Patsy Cline in his review of her 1997 studio album. "Evans opens the album by displaying her vocal resemblance to Cline on the ballad "True Lies." The similarity is striking, but what makes the song moving isn't the way Evans cannily evokes Cline's tone and phrasing," he wrote.

== Release and chart performance ==
"True Lies" was released as Evans's debut single on March 10, 1997 via RCA Nashville. It was issued as a 7" vinyl single and included "The Week the River Raged" as the B-side. The song spent six weeks on the Billboard Hot Country Songs chart and became a minor hit that year. It peaked at number 59 in the spring of 1997. "True Lies" was later issued on Evans' debut studio album entitled Three Chords and the Truth. The song was the album's opening track. "True Lies" would be one of three singles spawned from Three Chords and the Truth between 1997 and 1998. All three would only become minor country hits. Evans recalled the reasoning behind why "True Lies" may have reached a lower end of the Billboard country music chart: "There were a lot of things that played into it that were out of my control. Radio saw me as just a little bit too retro."

== Track listing ==
7" vinyl single

- "True Lies" – 2:34
- "The Week the River Raged" – 4:02

== Charts ==
Chart performance for "True Lies"
Chart (1997)	Peak position
US Hot Country Songs (Billboard)	59
