= Move On (The Warren Brothers song) =

2000 single by The Warren Brothers

Single by The Warren Brothers

from the album King of Nothing
- B-side: "Where Does It Hurt"
- Released: October 14, 2000
- Genre: Country
- Length: 3:15
- Label: BNA
- Songwriters: Brad Warren, Brett Warren, Danny Wilde
- Producers: The Warren Brothers, Chris Farren

The Warren Brothers singles chronology
"That's the Beat of a Heart" (2000)	"Move On" (2000)	"Where Does It Hurt" (2001)

"Move On" is a song co-written and recorded by American country music duo The Warren Brothers. It was released in October 2000 as the second single from the album King of Nothing. The song reached #17 on the Billboard Hot Country Singles & Tracks chart. The song was written by Brad Warren, Brett Warren and Danny Wilde.

== Chart performance ==
Chart (2000–2001)	Peak position
Canada Country Singles (RPM)	67 (Note: "My Next Thirty Years" had not yet peaked when RPM ceased publication in November 2000.)
US Hot Country Songs (Billboard)	17
US Bubbling Under Hot 100 (Billboard)	5
