= The Warren Brothers =

Country music duo

- Origin: Tampa, Florida, U.S.
- Genres: Country
- Years active: 1998–present
- Labels: BNA, 429
- Members: Brad Warren; Brett Warren
- Website: Official site

The Warren Brothers are an American country music duo composed of brothers Brett Warren (lead vocals, acoustic guitar, harmonica, mandolin, piano) and Brad Warren (background vocals, acoustic guitar, electric guitar). The duo has released three studio albums: Beautiful Day in the Cold Cruel World (1998) and King of Nothing (2000) on BNA Records, as well as Well Deserved Obscurity (2004) on Sig/429 and a 2005 compilation album, Barely Famous Hits. These four albums have produced nine charting singles on the Billboard Hot Country Songs charts, with the highest being "Move On" at No. 17 in late 2000-early 2001. Brad and Brett have also co-written songs for Taylor Swift, Dierks Bentley, Faith Hill, Tim McGraw, and Martina McBride.

== History ==
Brad and Brett Warren grew up in Tampa, Florida. They previously headlined local Christian heavy metal bands including a Christian rock heavy metal band called St. Warren. They moved from Florida to Nashville in 1995.

The duo signed to BNA Records in 1997 and released its debut album, Beautiful Day in the Cold Cruel World, in late 1998. This album produced three singles: "Guilty," "Better Man", and "She Wants to Rock," all of which charted within the Top 40 on the Billboard country singles charts. Pemberton Roach of Allmusic rated the album four stars out of five, comparing its sound to that of "slick, roots-influenced pop artists like Bruce Hornsby, Toad the Wet Sprocket and Glenn Frey" and saying that such a sound "avoid[s] any trace of Nashville clichés in favor of honest, straightforward lyrics and energetic, polished playing." Following the release of this album, The Warren Brothers toured with Tim McGraw and his wife, Faith Hill.

In September 2000, the duo released its second album, King of Nothing. Its first single release was the No. 22 "That's the Beat of a Heart," which featured a guest vocal from Sara Evans and was included on the soundtrack to the 2000 film Where the Heart Is. The second single from King of Nothing was the duo's highest-peaking single, the No. 17 "Move On," and finishing off the single releases was the No. 33 "Where Does It Hurt."

A seventh single, "Hey Mr. President", was released in 2003, peaking at No. 28. Following it were the non-album single "Break the Record" and two separate releases of "Sell a Lot of Beer," on which McGraw sang backing vocals. This latter song was included on the duo's third studio album, 2004's Well Deserved Obscurity. A compilation entitled Barely Famous Hits followed in 2005, and the same year, CMT signed the brothers to their own reality television series called Barely Famous: The Warren Brothers. They were also dropped from BNA in 2005. The brothers served as judges for one season of the talent competition Nashville Star as well.

== Songwriting careers ==
In the latter half of the 2000s, the duo began writing songs for other artists. Hill released two of the duo's co-writes as singles: "The Lucky One" in 2006, and "Red Umbrella" in 2007. Also, that year, McGraw performed "If You're Reading This" at the Academy of Country Music awards and released that song as a single after radio stations began playing a telecast of the song.

Martina McBride released two Warren Brothers co-writes from her 2007 album Waking Up Laughing: "Anyway" and "How I Feel," the former of which was also the first co-writer's credit of her career. McBride released a third Warren Brothers song, "Wrong Baby Wrong," in January 2010. Brad and Brett collaborated with Robert Ellis Orrall and Love and Theft member Stephen Barker Liles on this song. The brothers co-wrote McBride's 2011 single "Teenage Daughters".

In early 2009, Dierks Bentley had a Number One hit with the song "Feel That Fire," which he and the Warrens wrote with Brett Beavers. The Warren Brothers, along with Brett Beavers and his brother Jim Beavers, co-wrote both Tim McGraw's late-2010 single "Felt Good on My Lips", Toby Keith's late-2011 single "Red Solo Cup", and Keith Urban's 2013 single "Little Bit of Everything". It was also in 2013 when the duo won a Daytime Emmy for co-writing "Good Afternoon America" with Little Big Town.

== Discography ==
=== Albums ===
Title	Album details	Peak chart positions	
Title	Album details	US Country	US Heat
Beautiful Day in the Cold Cruel World	Release date: October 27, 1998; Label: BNA Records	73	—
King of Nothing	Release date: September 12, 2000; Label: BNA Records	34	43
Well Deserved Obscurity	Release date: April 6, 2004; Label: Sig/429	—	—
Barely Famous Hits	Release date: August 2, 2005; Label: BNA Records	35	6
"—" denotes releases that did not chart

=== Singles ===
Year	Single	Peak chart positions			Album
Year	Single	US Country	US Bubbling	CAN Country	Album
1998	"Guilty"	34	15	30	Beautiful Day in the Cold Cruel World
1999	"Better Man"	32	—	46	Beautiful Day in the Cold Cruel World
1999	"She Wants to Rock"	37	—	61	Beautiful Day in the Cold Cruel World
2000	"That's the Beat of a Heart" (featuring Sara Evans)	22	13	38	King of Nothing
2000	"Move On"	17	5	—	King of Nothing
2001	"Where Does It Hurt"	33	—	—	King of Nothing
2003	"Hey Mr. President"	28	—	—	—
2003	"Break the Record"	54	—	—	—
2003	"Sell a Lot of Beer"	51	—	—	—
2004	"Sell a Lot of Beer" (re-release with Tim McGraw, uncredited)	59	—	—	Barely Famous Hits
2005	"Change"	—	—	—	Barely Famous Hits
2010	"Dear Mr. God"	—	—	—	—
"—" denotes releases that did not chart

=== Music videos ===
Year	Video	Director
1998	"Guilty"	Susan Johnson
1999	"Better Man"	Susan Johnson
1999	"She Wants to Rock"	Brent Hedgecock
2000	"That's the Beat of a Heart" (featuring Sara Evans)	Shaun Silva
2004	"Sell a Lot of Beer"	Jason Morgan/Robert Zazzali
2005	"Change"	Shaun Silva
2010	"Dear Mr. God"	Shaun Silva
