= Guilty (The Warren Brothers song) =

Single by The Warren Brothers

from the album Beautiful Day in the Cold Cruel World
- Released: August 29, 1998
- Genre: Country
- Length: 3:57
- Label: BNA
- Songwriter(s): Brad Warren, Brett Warren, Dave Berg
- Producer(s): Chris Farren

The Warren Brothers singles chronology
"Guilty" (1998)	"Better Man" (1999)

"Guilty" is a debut song co-written and recorded by American country music duo The Warren Brothers. It was released in August 1998 as the first single from the album Beautiful Day in the Cold Cruel World. The song reached #34 on the Billboard Hot Country Singles & Tracks chart. The song was written by Brad Warren, Brett Warren and Dave Berg.

== Chart performance ==
Chart (1998)	Peak position
US Hot Country Songs (Billboard)	34
US Bubbling Under Hot 100 Singles (Billboard)	15
Canadian RPM Country Tracks	30
