= Streets of Heaven (album) =

Studio album by Sherrié Austin
- Released: August 12, 2003
- Genre: Country
- Length: 48:13
- Label: Broken Bow
- Producer: Jeff Balding; Dann Huff; Will Rambeaux

Sherrié Austin chronology
Followin' a Feelin' (2001)	Streets of Heaven (2003)	Circus Girl (2011)

Singles from Streets of Heaven
- 1. "Streets of Heaven" Released: June 2, 2003; 2. "Drivin' in the Sun" Released: March 2004

Streets of Heaven is the fourth studio album by Australian country music artist Sherrié Austin. It was released in 2003 by Broken Bow Records and peaked at #22 on the Billboard Top Country Albums chart. The album includes the singles "Streets of Heaven" and "Drivin' into the Sun."

== Track listing ==
No.	Title	Writer(s)	Length
1.	"Singin' to the Scarecrow"	Dennis Linde	3:38
2.	"Small Town Boy"	Sherrié Austin, Will Rambeaux	3:37
3.	"Ride 'em Cowgirl"	Austin, Rambeaux	4:07
4.	"Drivin' into the Sun"	Austin, Georgia Middleman	4:09
5.	"Fools Like Us"	Austin, Steven Bliss	3:42
6.	"Somebody's Somebody"	Austin, Bliss, Rambeaux	3:37
7.	"Love Unafraid"	Austin, Rob Crosby, Rambeaux	3:14
8.	"This Town Is That Small"	Austin, Rambeaux	3:49
9.	"Remind Me"	Austin	3:29
10.	"I'm Still Fallin'"	Austin, Kostas	3:35
11.	"Streets of Heaven"	Austin, Paul Duncan, Al Kasha	4:29
12.	"Like a Cat" (includes hidden track "Heart on Ice" (Austin, Rambeaux, Bliss))	Austin, Sally Barris, Templeton Thompson	6:47

== Personnel ==
- Adapted from AllMusic:
- Tim Akers - keyboards
- Sally Barris - backing vocals
- Larry Beard - acoustic guitar
- Steven Bliss - acoustic guitar
- Mike Brignardello - bass guitar
- J. T. Corenflos - electric guitar
- Larry Franklin - fiddle, mandolin
- Paul Franklin - pedal steel guitar
- Owen Hale - drums
- Dann Huff - acoustic guitar, electric guitar
- Mike Johnson - pedal steel guitar
- Michael Joyce - bass guitar
- Wayne Killius - drums
- Kostas - backing vocals
- Tim Lauer - keyboards
- Chris McHugh - drums
- Jerry McPherson - electric guitar
- Gary Morse - pedal steel guitar
- Jimmy Nichols - keyboards
- Russ Pahl - banjo, resonator guitar, electric guitar, lap steel guitar, pedal steel guitar
- Kim Parent - backing vocals
- Steven Sheehan - acoustic guitar
- Russell Terrell - backing vocals
- John Willis - acoustic guitar, electric guitar
- Lonnie Wilson - drums
- Jonathan Yudkin - cello, fiddle, kalimba, mandolin, viola

== Chart performance ==
Chart (2003)	Peak position
U.S. Billboard Top Country Albums	22
U.S. Billboard 200	144
U.S. Billboard Top Independent Albums	6
U.S. Billboard Top Heatseekers	3
