= Sherrié Austin =

Australian retired actress, singer (born 1970)

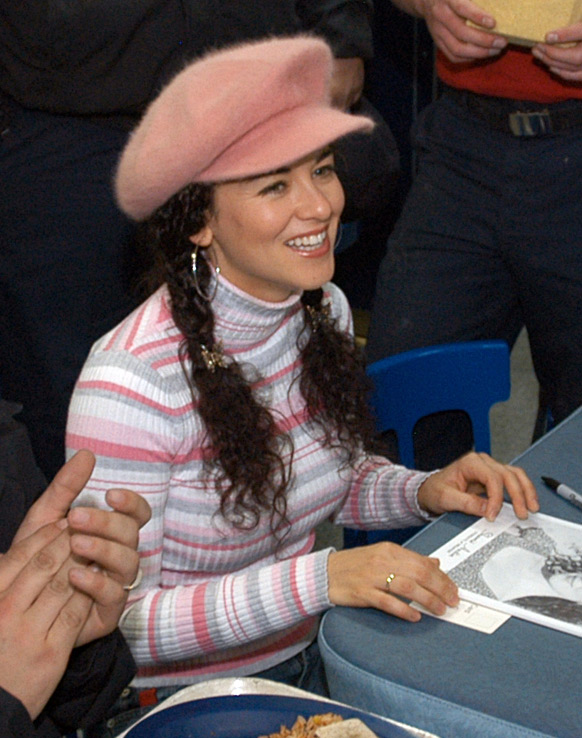
- Austin onboard the USS Enterprise in 2004

Background information
- Also known as: Sherrie Krenn
- Born: Sherrie Veronica Krenn; 28 August 1970 (age 56); Sydney, Australia
- Genre: Country
- Occupations: Singer, actress
- Instruments: Vocals, guitar
- Years active: 1984–2011
- Labels: Arista Nashville; WE Records/Madacy; Broken Bow; Circus Girl, LLC
- Formerly of: Colourhaus

Sherrie Veronica Krenn (born 28 August 1970), known professionally as Sherrié Austin (formerly known as Sherrie Krenn), is an Australian former actress and country music singer. Starting as a singer in her teenage years, Austin initially recorded as one half of the duo Colourhaus, which also featured Phil Radford. After leaving Colourhaus, she moved to the United States in pursuit of a solo career. There, she recorded five studio albums, and charted several singles on the Billboard Hot Country Songs charts. Her highest charting single was the No. 18 "Streets of Heaven" in 2003. Her last album was released on 15 November 2011.

== Career ==
=== Early career ===
Austin got her start in music opening for Johnny Cash in Australia at the age of 14. She later moved to the United States where she took up acting. She is most known in the United States for playing the role of Pippa McKenna on The Facts of Life during its final season.

In 1991, she appeared as "Lady Penelope" on episode No. 20 of the first season of the television comedy series The Fresh Prince of Bel-Air. In the 1990s, she started a singing career, teaming up with Phil Radford in 1992, to form a duo, Colourhaus, which released one album, Water to the Soul. The song "Innocent Child" taken from that album was issued as a single, with "We Talk to the Angels" on the B-side, and it peaked at No. 50 on the Billboard Hot 100. The Colourhaus song "Colour Me You" was on the soundtrack of the "Rookie of the Year" episode of the television series Baywatch on 5 October 1992.

=== Nashville move ===
Afterwards, Austin moved to Nashville, Tennessee, to pursue a career in country music. Her first solo contract was with Arista Nashville, with the album Words being released in 1997. It produced singles in "Lucky in Love", "One Solitary Tear", "Put Your Heart into It", and "Innocent Man". "Lucky in Love" and "Put Your Heart into It" both reached Top 40 on the country charts with a peak of No. 34 each.

Her second and final album for Arista was 1999's Love in the Real World, led off by the No. 29 "Never Been Kissed", which was followed by "Little Bird". After RCA acquired Arista Records, Austin's publishing company, Reynsong Publishing, formed Wrensong Entertainment and signed to Madacy Entertainment for her next album, Followin' a Feelin', which produced another single in its lead-off single, a cover of Dolly Parton's "Jolene".

Later, she switched to the independent Broken Bow Records label. Her fourth album of country music, titled Streets of Heaven, produced her biggest country hit in its title track. Following this single was "Son of a Preacher Man", a cover of the Dusty Springfield song, which was never included on an album.

=== Broadway years ===
Austin moved to New York City in 2005 and appeared in the New York Musical Theater Festival's production of Bonnie & Clyde. The New York Times commented that she was "a sultry young country music singer who plays the notorious criminal Bonnie Parker and does for this musical what Reba McEntire did for the 1999 revival of Annie Get Your Gun. That twang in her voice provides some much-needed authenticity in excellent pop-country numbers like "Ain't Goin' Back." And it's easy to tell by her hip-swiveling poses that this is a woman who knows how to hold a stage."

The following year, Austin performed in Ring of Fire – The Johnny Cash Musical Show at the Ethel Barrymore Theatre. She also performed in the production of Warrior, a musical about the American-Indian athlete Jim Thorpe, where CurtainUp.com described her as "outstanding". She returned to Nashville in 2006.

=== Nashville return ===
Austin co-wrote Danielle Peck's 2007 single "Bad for Me", the title track to Blake Shelton's 2008 album Startin' Fires, George Strait's "Where Have I Been All My Life" off his 2009 album Twang, and Tim McGraw's duet, with wife Faith Hill, "Shotgun Rider" off his Let It Go album in 2007. Austin left Broken Bow in 2008.

She was named one of 2011's "25 Most Beautiful People" by Nashville Lifestyles Magazine.

In summer 2011, The Sundance Channel announced that Austin and her friend Shane Stevens would be on the second season of Girls Who Like Boys Who Like Boys, which was filmed in Nashville and features women and their gay best friends. The season started 18 November 2011.

=== Circus Girl (2011) ===
Austin's most recent album, Circus Girl, her first in eight years, is described as a series of stories interpreted by a strong woman, about women, and for women. Austin feels it's something her female fans have been clamouring for, for quite some time.

"The last few years I had been complaining about that fact that there weren’t any females speaking to women above the age of 30, so I started thinking about how I was writing my songs and came up with the idea for "Friday Night Girls"... I wanted to write a three-minute song with every Sex and the City episode that had ever existed, so I did. I quickly noticed that the women in my audiences loved it and so I switched my songwriting focus for a while to concentrate on that audience, who are my peers, to speak to them", says Austin.

Circus Girl was released independently on 15 November 2011.

== Discography ==
=== Studio albums ===
Title	Album details	Peak chart positions			
Title	Album details	US Country	US	US Indie	US Heat
Water to the Soul (as Colourhaus)	Release date: 21 April 1992; Label: Interscope Records	—	—	—	—
Words	Release date: 15 July 1997; Label: Arista Nashville	41	—	—	35
Love in the Real World	Release date: 10 August 1999; Label: Arista Nashville	14	150	—	8
Followin' a Feelin'	Release date: 20 March 2001; Label: Madacy Entertainment	43	—	38	—
Streets of Heaven	Release date: 12 August 2003; Label: Broken Bow Records	22	144	6	3
Circus Girl	Release date: 15 November 2011; Label: Circus Girl, LLC	—	—	—	—
"—" denotes releases that did not chart

=== Singles ===
Year	Single	Peak chart positions			Album
Year	Single	US Country	US	CAN Country	Album
1992	"Innocent Child"	—	50	—	Water to the Soul (as Colourhaus)
1992	"Moving Mountains"	—	—	—	Water to the Soul (as Colourhaus)
1997	"Lucky in Love"	34	—	31	Words
1997	"One Solitary Tear"	41	—	85	Words
1998	"Put Your Heart into It"	34	— (Note: "Put Your Heart into It" did not enter the Hot 100, but peaked at number 4 on Bubbling Under Hot 100 Singles, which acts as a 25-song extension of the Hot 100.)	36	Words
1998	"Tenderly"	—	—	—	Words
1998	"Innocent Man"	74	—	87	Words
1999	"Never Been Kissed"	29	89	31	Love in the Real World
1999	"Little Bird"	49	—	43	Love in the Real World
2001	"Jolene"	55	—	—	Followin' a Feelin'
2001	"Time, Love & Money"	—	—	—	Followin' a Feelin'
2001	"In the Meantime"	—	—	—	Followin' a Feelin'
2003	"Streets of Heaven"	18	— (Note: "Streets of Heaven" did not enter the Hot 100, but peaked at number 13 on Bubbling Under Hot 100 Singles, which acts as a 25-song extension of the Hot 100.)	—	Streets of Heaven
2004	"Drivin' Into the Sun"	50	—	—	Streets of Heaven
2004	"Son of a Preacher Man"	46	—	—	—N/a
"—" denotes releases that did not chart

=== Music videos ===
Year	Video	Director
1992	"Innocent Child"	
1997	"Lucky in Love"	Roger Pistole
1997	"One Solitary Tear"	Steven Goldmann
1998	"Put Your Heart into It"	Gerry Wenner
1999	"Never Been Kissed"	Morgan Lawley
1999	"Little Bird"	Morgan Lawley
2001	"Jolene"	Peter Zavadil
2001	"In the Meantime"	David McClister
2003	"Streets of Heaven"	
2004	"Drivin' Into the Sun"	Gerry Wenner
2011	"Naughty or Nice"	David Shamban

== Awards ==
=== Country Music Awards of Australia ===
The Country Music Awards of Australia (CMAA) (also known as the Golden Guitar Awards) are held in January during the Tamworth Country Music Festival, celebrating recording excellence in the Australian country music industry. They have been held annually since 1973.

Year	Nominee / work	Award	Result
1998	Sherrié Austin for "One Solitary Tear"	New Talent of the Year	Won

== Filmography ==
- The Facts of Life (1987–1988) (television)
- Call From Space (1989)
- Open House (1989) (television – one episode)
- Exile (1990) (TV film)
- Shadows of the Heart (1990)
- An American Summer (1991)
- The Fresh Prince of Bel Air (1991) (television – one episode)
