= That's the Beat of a Heart =

Single by The Warren Brothers featuring Sara Evans

from the album King of Nothing
- B-side: "Grow Young with You"
- Released: March 27, 2000
- Genre: Country
- Length: 3:36
- Label: BNA
- Songwriters: Tena Clark; Tim Heintz
- Producer: Chris Farren

The Warren Brothers singles chronology
"She Wants to Rock" (1999)	"That's the Beat of a Heart" (2000)	"Move On" (2000)

Sara Evans singles chronology
"Fool, I'm a Woman" (1999)	"That's the Beat of a Heart" (2000)	"Born to Fly" (2000)

"That's the Beat of a Heart" is a song by American country music duo The Warren Brothers featuring RCA Nashville artist Sara Evans. The song was penned by Tena Clark and Tim Heintz and produced by Chris Farren. The song was released to country radio on March 27, 2000, as the lead single from their second studio album King of Nothing (2000) via BNA Records. It was included in the soundtrack for the 2000 film Where the Heart Is.

The song peaked at number 22 on the US Hot Country Songs chart and number 38 on the Canada Country Tracks. Its chart performance intertwined with Evans's then-newest single "Born to Fly". "That's the Beat of a Heart" would nominated for Vocal Event of the Year at the 2001 Academy of Country Music Awards, which it lost to Lee Ann Womack and Sons of the Desert's "I Hope You Dance".

== Music video ==
The music video was directed by Shaun Silva and filmed in Franklin, Tennessee.

== Charts ==
=== Weekly charts ===
Chart (2000)	Peak position
Canada Country Singles (RPM)	38
US Bubbling Under Hot 100 (Billboard)	13
US Hot Country Songs (Billboard)	22
US Country Top 50 (Radio & Records)	18

=== Year-end charts ===
Chart (2000)	Position
US Country Songs (Billboard)	63
