= 1992 in country music =

This is a list of notable events in country music that took place in the year 1992.

== Events ==
- January — After 23 years of its tried-and-true formula, the producers of Hee Haw unveil an extensively revamped show in time for the start of its belated 24th season. The show's new urban setting, along with more pop-oriented country guests, is a resounding failure and lasts only through the end of the season. That fall, viewers will be greeted with Hee Haw Silver – a collection of classic shows, with new introductions by longtime host Roy Clark; "Silver" will fill out the show's 25th (and final) season.
- June 27 - At a concert in Bonner Springs, Kansas, a heavily intoxicated Hank Williams Jr. repeatedly insults the crowd and exits the stage after only 20 minutes. Williams later issues an apology.
- August 28 — The major motion picture Honeymoon in Vegas is released. The soundtrack features several country music performers, including Dwight Yoakam, Travis Tritt and Trisha Yearwood covering Elvis Presley songs.
- October 23 — The major motion picture Pure Country is released, starring George Strait, who also sang the soundtrack.

=== No dates ===
- At age 52, former country star Jonie Mosby (of the 1960s-early 1970s duo Johnny and Jonie Mosby) makes national headlines when she becomes the oldest woman in the United States to undergo in vitro fertilization and successfully bear a child.
- Line dancing becomes a national fad, tied to the success of at least two major country music hits: Billy Ray Cyrus' "Achy Breaky Heart" and Brooks & Dunn's "Boot Scootin' Boogie." Throughout the rest of the decade, several major country music hits would have dance remixes, and several videos would be released.

== Top hits of the year ==
=== Singles released by American artists ===
US	CAN	Single	Artist	Reference
9	6	Aces	Suzy Bogguss	
1	1	Achy Breaky Heart	Billy Ray Cyrus	
13	8	After the Lights Go Out	Ricky Van Shelton	
11	13	All Is Fair in Love and War	Ronnie Milsap	
22	18	Baby, I'm Missing You	Highway 101	
2	3	Backroads	Ricky Van Shelton	
2	2	Better Class of Losers	Randy Travis	
4	3	Billy the Kid	Billy Dean	
1	1	Boot Scootin' Boogie	Brooks & Dunn	
2	2	Born Country	Alabama	
10	7	Broken Promise Land	Mark Chesnutt	
4	14	Bubba Shot the Jukebox	Mark Chesnutt	
7	12	Burn Me Down	Marty Stuart	
4	2	Burn One Down	Clint Black	
3	3	Cadillac Style	Sammy Kershaw	
5	2	Cafe on the Corner	Sawyer Brown	
3	3	Come In Out of the Pain	Doug Stone	
2	1	Could've Been Me	Billy Ray Cyrus	
1	1	Dallas	Alan Jackson	
12	5	Don't Go Near the Water	Sammy Kershaw	
1	1	Don't Let Our Love Start Slippin' Away	Vince Gill	
3	1	The Dirt Road	Sawyer Brown	
5	11	Even the Man in the Moon Is Cryin'	Mark Collie	
2	5	Every Second	Collin Raye	
4	7	Except for Monday	Lorrie Morgan	
13	18	First Time for Everything	Little Texas	
16	21	Five O'Clock World	Hal Ketchum	
5	11	Going Out of My Mind	McBride & the Ride	
14	13	Going Out Tonight	Mary Chapin Carpenter	
5	6	Gone as a Girl Can Get	George Strait	
3	1	The Greatest Man I Never Knew	Reba McEntire	
18	13	The Heart That You Own	Dwight Yoakam	
1	1	I Cross My Heart	George Strait	
4	3	I Feel Lucky	Mary Chapin Carpenter	
13	15	I Know Where Love Lives	Hal Ketchum	
1	1	I Saw the Light	Wynonna Judd	
1	1	I Still Believe in You	Vince Gill	
5	4	I Wouldn't Have It Any Other Way	Aaron Tippin	
20	13	I'd Surrender All	Randy Travis	
23	11	I'll Stop Loving You	Mike Reid	
1	1	I'll Think of Something	Mark Chesnutt	
1	1	I'm in a Hurry (And Don't Know Why)	Alabama	
1	1	If I Didn't Have You	Randy Travis	
3	1	If There Hadn't Been You	Billy Dean	
11	12	If You Want to Find Love	Kenny Rogers	
4	5	If Your Heart Ain't Busy Tonight	Tanya Tucker	
1	1	In This Life	Collin Raye	
5	4	Is It Cold in Here	Joe Diffie	
1	1	Is There Life Out There	Reba McEntire	
7	4	It Only Hurts When I Cry	Dwight Yoakam	
13	22	Jealous Bone	Patty Loveless	
4	14	Jesus and Mama	Confederate Railroad	
1	1	A Jukebox with a Country Song	Doug Stone	
10	54	Just Call Me Lonesome	Radney Foster	
6	11	Leave Him Out of This	Steve Wariner	
6	9	Letting Go	Suzy Bogguss	
11	14	Lonesome Standard Time	Kathy Mattea	
10	18	A Long Time Ago	The Remingtons	
4	12	Look at Us	Vince Gill	
5	10	Lord Have Mercy on the Working Man	Travis Tritt	
6	6	Lost and Found	Brooks & Dunn	
1	1	Love, Me	Collin Raye	
1	1	Love's Got a Hold on You	Alan Jackson	
10	9	Lovin' All Night	Rodney Crowell	
9	9	Mama Don't Forget to Pray for Me	Diamond Rio	
3	4	Maybe It Was Memphis	Pam Tillis	
3	3	Midnight in Montgomery	Alan Jackson	
1	1	Neon Moon	Brooks & Dunn	
16	17	Next Thing Smokin'	Joe Diffie	
12	7	The Night the Lights Went Out in Georgia	Reba McEntire	
1	1	No One Else on Earth	Wynonna Judd	
2	3	Norma Jean Riley	Diamond Rio	
15	12	Not Too Much to Ask	Mary Chapin Carpenter with Joe Diffie	
4	7	Nothing Short of Dying	Travis Tritt	
18	16	Now That's Country	Marty Stuart	
7	15	Nowhere Bound	Diamond Rio	
5	4	Old Flames Have New Names	Mark Chesnutt	
4	3	Only the Wind	Billy Dean	
9	9	Outbound Plane	Suzy Bogguss	
3	2	Papa Loved Mama	Garth Brooks	
2	1	Past the Point of Rescue	Hal Ketchum	
25	20	Play, Ruby, Play	Clinton Gregory	
1	1	The River	Garth Brooks	
2	5	Rock My Baby	Shenandoah	
4	6	Runnin' Behind	Tracy Lawrence	
2	2	Sacred Ground	McBride & the Ride	
12	23	Same Ol' Love	Ricky Skaggs	
2	1	Seminole Wind	John Anderson	
3	3	Shake the Sugar Tree	Pam Tillis	
1	1	She Is His Only Need	Wynonna Judd	
1	1	She's Got the Rhythm (And I Got the Blues)	Alan Jackson	
5	3	Ships That Don't Come In	Joe Diffie	
3	3	So Much Like My Dad	George Strait	
1	2	Some Girls Do	Sawyer Brown	
3	15	Some Kind of Trouble	Tanya Tucker	
15	12	Somebody's Doin' Me Right	Keith Whitley	
14	10	Something in Red	Lorrie Morgan	
1	1	Sticks and Stones	Tracy Lawrence	
1	1	Straight Tequila Night	John Anderson	
2	2	Take a Little Trip	Alabama	
2	3	Take Your Memory with You	Vince Gill	
8	4	That's What I Like About You	Trisha Yearwood	
1	1	There Ain't Nothin' Wrong with the Radio	Aaron Tippin	
7	6	This One's Gonna Hurt You (For a Long, Long Time)	Marty Stuart & Travis Tritt	
23	11	The Time Has Come	Martina McBride	
3	19	The Tips of My Fingers	Steve Wariner	
3	2	Today's Lonely Fool	Tracy Lawrence	
4	2	Turn That Radio On	Ronnie Milsap	
2	2	Two Sparrows in a Hurricane	Tanya Tucker	
18	34	Two-Timin' Me	The Remingtons	
4	6	Warning Labels	Doug Stone	
2	4	Watch Me	Lorrie Morgan	
12	12	We Shall Be Free	Garth Brooks	
2	1	We Tell Ourselves	Clint Black	
24	19	What Kind of Fool	Lionel Cartwright	
2	3	What Kind of Fool Do You Think I Am	Lee Roy Parnell	
11	2	What Kind of Love	Rodney Crowell	
1	1	What She's Doing Now	Garth Brooks	
7	5	Whatcha Gonna Do with a Cowboy	Chris LeDoux	
3	2	When It Comes to You	John Anderson	
9	9	When She Cries	Restless Heart	
23	16	Wher'm I Gonna Live?	Billy Ray Cyrus	
2	4	The Whiskey Ain't Workin'	Travis Tritt with Marty Stuart	
2	2	(Without You) What Do I Do with Me	Tanya Tucker	
4	12	The Woman Before Me	Trisha Yearwood	
9	12	A Woman Loves	Steve Wariner	
5	4	Wrong Side of Memphis	Trisha Yearwood	
17	13	Yard Sale	Sammy Kershaw	
5	18	You and Forever and Me	Little Texas	
3	21	You Can Depend on Me	Restless Heart	

=== Singles released by Canadian artists ===
US	CAN	Single	Artist	Reference
—	7	Bad Day for Trains	Patricia Conroy	
—	15	Candle in the Window	Joan Kennedy	
—	9	Clearly Canadian	George Fox	
—	18	Diamonds	Joel Feeney	
—	20	Drifting Cowboy	Gary Fjellgaard	
—	8	Everybody Knows	Prairie Oyster	
—	10	Here Today, Here Tomorrow	George Fox	
—	9	I Can See Arkansas	Anne Murray	
—	18	I Walk These Rails	Sylvia Tyson	
—	15	If You Want Love	Joan Kennedy	
—	14	It Comes Back to You	Cassandra Vasik	
—	9	Lights of Laramie	Ian Tyson	
—	8	My Baby Loves Me (Just the Way That I Am)	Patricia Conroy	
51	8	One Precious Love	Prairie Oyster	
43	1	One Time Around	Michelle Wright	
—	7	Orangedale Whistle	The Rankin Family	
—	17	Schubenacadie Tinsmith Man	Wayne Rostad	
—	10	Still in the Game	Don Neilson	
10	1	Take It Like a Man	Michelle Wright	
—	20	Those Stars	Cassandra Vasik	
—	8	When You're Not Loving Me	Tracey Prescott & Lonesome Daddy	
—	5	Which Face Should I Put on Tonight	Cassandra Vasik	
—	10	Wildflowers	Cassandra Vasik	
—	10	Will I Do (Till the Real Thing Comes Along)	Prairie Oyster	
—	13	(You Made A) Rock of Gibraltar	Cindi Cain	

== Top new album releases ==
US	CAN	Album	Artist	Record label	Release date	Reference
62	17	15 of the Best	Anne Murray	Liberty	Apr 27	
11	4	American Pride	Alabama	RCA Nashville	Aug 11	
	20	Bad Day for Trains	Patricia Conroy	Warner		
	9	Believe in Your Country	Stompin' Tom Connors	Capitol	Mar 13	
2	3	Beyond the Season	Garth Brooks	Liberty	Aug 17	
26	1	Big Iron Horses	Restless Heart	RCA Nashville	Oct 9	
55	18	Blue Frontier	The Remingtons	BNA	Jan 28	
23	10	Cafe on the Corner	Sawyer Brown	Curb	Aug 25	
12	4	Can't Run from Yourself	Tanya Tucker	Liberty	Nov 29	
1	1	The Chase	Garth Brooks	Liberty	Sep 14	
6	9	Chipmunks in Low Places	Alvin and the Chipmunks	Epic	Sep 21	
24		Close to the Edge	Diamond Rio	Arista Nashville	Oct 27	
	10	Close to the Floor	Ashley MacIsaac	A&M		
6	4	Come On Come On	Mary Chapin Carpenter	Columbia	Jun 26	
7	19	Confederate Railroad	Confederate Railroad	Atlantic	Apr 13	
12	8	The Dirt Road	Sawyer Brown	Curb		
	18	Divided Highway	Terry Kelly	Gun		
	1	Fare Thee Well Love	The Rankin Family	Capitol		
19	17	First Time for Everything	Little Texas	Warner Bros.		
19		From the Heart	Doug Stone	Epic		
	2	From the Heart: 15 Career Classics	The Judds	BMG		
43	13	Greatest Hits	Shenandoah	Columbia		
9		Greatest Hits Plus	Ricky Van Shelton	Columbia		
14		Greatest Hits, Vol. 1	Randy Travis	Warner Bros.		
20	4	Greatest Hits, Vol. 2	Randy Travis	Warner Bros.		
2	3	The Hard Way	Clint Black	RCA Nashville		
12	7	Hearts in Armor	Trisha Yearwood	MCA Nashville		
	24	Higher Ground	Joan Kennedy	MCA		
5	17	Holding My Own	George Strait	MCA Nashville		
23	11	Homeward Looking Angel	Pam Tillis	Arista Nashville		
4	6	Honeymoon in Vegas Soundtrack	Various Artists	Epic		
47	4	I Never Knew Lonely	Vince Gill	RCA Nashville		
3	3	I Still Believe in You	Vince Gill	MCA Nashville		
10	12	In This Life	Collin Raye	Epic		
1	1	It's Your Call	Reba McEntire	MCA Nashville		
30	9	Life Is Messy	Rodney Crowell	Columbia		
4	6	Life's a Dance	John Michael Montgomery	Atlantic		
34	14	Long Time Comin'	Shenandoah	RCA Nashville		
9	5	Longnecks & Short Stories	Mark Chesnutt	MCA Nashville		
1	5	A Lot About Livin' (And a Little 'bout Love)	Alan Jackson	Arista Nashville		
7	22	Maverick	Hank Williams, Jr.	Curb/Warner Bros.		
	1	More Country Heat	Various Artists	RCA		
20	2	Now and Then	Michelle Wright	Arista Nashville		
1	1	Pure Country (Soundtrack)	George Strait	MCA Nashville		
6	9	Read Between the Lines	Aaron Tippin	RCA Nashville		
22	25	Regular Joe	Joe Diffie	Epic		
27	15	Sacred Ground	McBride & the Ride	MCA Nashville		
10	11	Seminole Wind	John Anderson	BNA		
	22	So Many Roads	The Good Brothers	Savannah		
1	1	Some Gave All	Billy Ray Cyrus	Mercury/PolyGram		
22	28	Straight Talk Soundtrack	Dolly Parton	Hollywood		
36	21	Sure Love	Hal Ketchum	Curb		
	19	Thinking of You	Rita MacNeil	Virgin		
12	6	This One's Gonna Hurt You	Marty Stuart	MCA Nashville		
49	21	The Time Has Come	Martina McBride	RCA Nashville		
23		A Travis Tritt Christmas: Loving Time of the Year	Travis Tritt	Warner Bros.		
6	3	T-R-O-U-B-L-E	Travis Tritt	Warner Bros.		
24	32	Walls Can Fall	George Jones	MCA Nashville		
15		Watch Me	Lorrie Morgan	BNA		
9		Whatcha Gonna Do with a Cowboy	Chris LeDoux	Liberty		
58	22	Where Forever Begins	Neal McCoy	Atlantic		
1	1	Wynonna	Wynonna Judd	Curb/MCA Nashville		

=== Other top albums ===
US	CAN	Album	Artist	Record label
44		American Patriot	Lee Greenwood	Liberty
63		At Her Best	Patsy Cline	Hollywood
32		At the Ryman	Emmylou Harris	Reprise
44	26	The Best of Hank & Hank	Hank Williams & Hank Williams, Jr.	Mercury/PolyGram
65		Country Music for Kids	Various Artists	Walt Disney
46		Del Rio, TX 1959	Radney Foster	Arista Nashville
75		Every Time You Say Goodbye	Alison Krauss	Rounder
53		The First Christmas	Doug Stone	Epic
68		The Latest and the Greatest	The Bellamy Brothers	Intersound
41		Lonesome Standard Time	Kathy Mattea	Mercury/PolyGram
60		Love Is Strong	Paul Overstreet	RCA Nashville
66		Love Without Mercy	Lee Roy Parnell	Arista Nashville
72		The More I Learn	Ronna Reeves	Mercury/PolyGram
57		No Sir	Darryl & Don Ellis	Epic
68		Sneakin' Around	Chet Atkins & Jerry Reed	Columbia
75		A Street Man Named Desire	Pirates of the Mississippi	Liberty
70		Today's Best Country	Various Artists	K-Tel
50		Today's Hot Country	Various Artists	K-Tel
70		Too Dumb for New York City, Too Ugly for L.A.	Waylon Jennings	Epic
58		Tourist in Paradise	Cleve Francis	Liberty
59		Twilight Town	Mike Reid	Columbia
31		Voices in the Wind	Suzy Bogguss	Liberty

== On television ==
=== Regular series ===
- Hee Haw (1969–1993, syndicated)

== Births ==
- May 19 — Lainey Wilson, rising country singer-songwriter of the 2020s ("Things a Man Oughta Know", "Heart Like a Truck").
- June 15 – Parker McCollum, country singer-songwriter known for his 2020 hit "Pretty Heart".
- June 26 — Jennette McCurdy, actress, screenwriter, producer, singer and songwriter.
- October 9 – Chase Bryant, up-and-coming singer of the mid-2010s, including "Take It On Back" and "Little Bit of You."
- November 23 — Miley Cyrus, daughter of Billy Ray Cyrus; actress and singer.
- December 1 – Travis Denning, country singer-songwriter known for his 2020 hit "After a Few".

== Deaths ==
- February 19 – Biff Collie, 66, country music disc jockey, promoter and journalist (cancer).
- October 25 — Roger Miller, 56, singer-songwriter best known for Grammy Award winner "King of the Road". (throat cancer)
- November 23 — Roy Acuff, 89, country music pioneer from the 1930s onward, and Grand Ole Opry institution. (heart failure)

== Hall of Fame inductees ==
=== Bluegrass Music Hall of Fame inductees ===
- The Stanley Brothers
  - Carter Stanley
  - Ralph Stanley
- Reno and Smiley
  - Don Reno
  - Arthur Lee "Red" Smiley

=== Country Music Hall of Fame inductees ===
- George Jones (1931–2013)
- Frances Preston (1928–2012)

=== Canadian Country Music Hall of Fame inductees ===
- Carroll Baker
- Gordon Burnett

== Major awards ==
=== Grammy Awards ===
- Best Female Country Vocal Performance — "I Feel Lucky", Mary Chapin Carpenter
- Best Male Country Vocal Performance — I Still Believe in You, Vince Gill
- Best Country Performance by a Duo or Group with Vocal — At the Ryman, Emmylou Harris and the Nash Ramblers
- Best Country Collaboration with Vocals — "The Whiskey Ain't Workin'", Marty Stuart and Travis Tritt
- Best Country Instrumental Performance — "Sneakin' Around", Chet Atkins and Jerry Reed
- Best Country Song — "I Still Believe in You", Vince Gill and John Barlow Jarvis (Performer: Vince Gill)
- Best Bluegrass Album — Every Time You Say Goodbye, Alison Krauss & Union Station

=== Juno Awards ===
- Country Male Vocalist of the Year — Gary Fjellgaard
- Country Female Vocalist of the Year — Michelle Wright
- Country Group or Duo of the Year — Tracey Prescott & Lonesome Daddy

=== Academy of Country Music ===
- Entertainer of the Year — Garth Brooks
- Song of the Year — "I Still Believe in You", Vince Gill and John Barlow Jarvis (Performer: Vince Gill)
- Single of the Year — "Boot Scootin' Boogie", Brooks & Dunn
- Album of the Year — Brand New Man, Brooks & Dunn
- Top Male Vocalist — Vince Gill
- Top Female Vocalist — Mary Chapin Carpenter
- Top Vocal Duo — Brooks & Dunn
- Top Vocal Group — Diamond Rio
- Top New Male Vocalist — Tracy Lawrence
- Top New Female Vocalist — Michelle Wright
- Top New Vocal Duo or Group — Confederate Railroad
- Video of the Year — "Two Sparrows in a Hurricane", Tanya Tucker (Director: Joanne Gardner)

=== ARIA Awards ===
(presented in Sydney on March 6, 1992)

- Best Country Album - Out of the Blue (Anne Kirkpatrick)

=== Canadian Country Music Association ===
- Bud Country Fans' Choice Award — Rita MacNeil
- Male Artist of the Year — Ian Tyson
- Female Artist of the Year — Michelle Wright
- Group or Duo of the Year — Prairie Oyster
- SOCAN Song of the Year — "Did You Fall in Love with Me", Joan Besen
- Single of the Year — "Take It Like a Man", Michelle Wright
- Album of the Year — Everybody Knows, Prairie Oyster
- Top Selling Album — Ropin' the Wind, Garth Brooks
- Video of the Year — "Take It Like a Man", Michelle Wright
- Vista Rising Star Award — Cassandra Vasik
- Vocal Collaboration of the Year — Gary Fjellgaard and Linda Kidder

=== Country Music Association ===
- Entertainer of the Year — Garth Brooks
- Song of the Year — "Look at Us", Vince Gill and Max D. Barnes (Performer: Vince Gill)
- Single of the Year — "Achy Breaky Heart", Billy Ray Cyrus
- Album of the Year — Ropin' the Wind, Garth Brooks
- Male Vocalist of the Year — Vince Gill
- Female Vocalist of the Year — Mary Chapin Carpenter
- Vocal Duo of the Year — Brooks & Dunn
- Vocal Group of the Year — Diamond Rio
- Horizon Award — Suzy Bogguss
- Music Video of the Year — "Midnight in Montgomery", Alan Jackson (Director: Jim Shea)
- Vocal Event of the Year — Marty Stuart and Travis Tritt
- Musician of the Year — Mark O'Connor

== Other links ==
- Country Music Association
- Inductees of the Country Music Hall of Fame
