= List of RPM number-one country singles of 1992 =

These are the Canadian number-one country songs of 1992, per the RPM Country Tracks chart.

Issue date	Title	Artist	Source
January 18	Love, Me	Collin Raye	
January 25	Love, Me	Collin Raye	
February 1	Sticks and Stones	Tracy Lawrence	
February 8	A Jukebox with a Country Song	Doug Stone	
February 15	The Dirt Road	Sawyer Brown	
February 22	The Dirt Road	Sawyer Brown	
February 29	What She's Doing Now	Garth Brooks	
March 7	What She's Doing Now	Garth Brooks	
March 14	What She's Doing Now	Garth Brooks	
March 21	Straight Tequila Night	John Anderson	
March 28	Dallas	Alan Jackson	
April 4	Is There Life Out There	Reba McEntire	
April 11	Is There Life Out There	Reba McEntire	
April 18	She Is His Only Need	Wynonna	
April 25	She Is His Only Need	Wynonna	
May 2	She Is His Only Need	Wynonna	
May 9	There Ain't Nothin' Wrong with the Radio	Aaron Tippin	
May 16	Past the Point of Rescue	Hal Ketchum	
May 23	Neon Moon	Brooks & Dunn	
May 30	Neon Moon	Brooks & Dunn	
June 6	Take It Like a Man	Michelle Wright	
June 13	Take It Like a Man	Michelle Wright	
June 20	Take It Like a Man	Michelle Wright	
June 27	Achy Breaky Heart	Billy Ray Cyrus	
July 4	Achy Breaky Heart	Billy Ray Cyrus	
July 11	Achy Breaky Heart	Billy Ray Cyrus	
July 18	I Saw the Light	Wynonna	
July 25	I Saw the Light	Wynonna	
August 1	I Saw the Light	Wynonna	
August 8	The River	Garth Brooks	
August 15	Boot Scootin' Boogie	Brooks & Dunn	
August 22	Boot Scootin' Boogie	Brooks & Dunn	
August 29	Boot Scootin' Boogie	Brooks & Dunn	
September 5	We Tell Ourselves	Clint Black	
September 12	We Tell Ourselves	Clint Black	
September 19	I'll Think of Something	Mark Chesnutt	
September 26	I Still Believe in You	Vince Gill	
October 3	Could've Been Me	Billy Ray Cyrus	
October 10	One Time Around	Michelle Wright	
October 17	In This Life	Collin Raye	
October 24	Love's Got a Hold on You	Alan Jackson	
October 31	If I Didn't Have You	Randy Travis	
November 7	If I Didn't Have You	Randy Travis	
November 14	No One Else on Earth	Wynonna	
November 21	The Greatest Man I Never Knew	Reba McEntire	
November 28	Seminole Wind	John Anderson	
December 5	If There Hadn't Been You	Billy Dean	
December 12	I'm in a Hurry (And Don't Know Why)	Alabama	
December 19	I Cross My Heart	George Strait	
December 26	I Cross My Heart	George Strait	

== See also ==
- 1992 in music
- List of number-one country hits of 1992 (U.S.)
