= List of Hot Country Singles & Tracks number ones of 1992 =

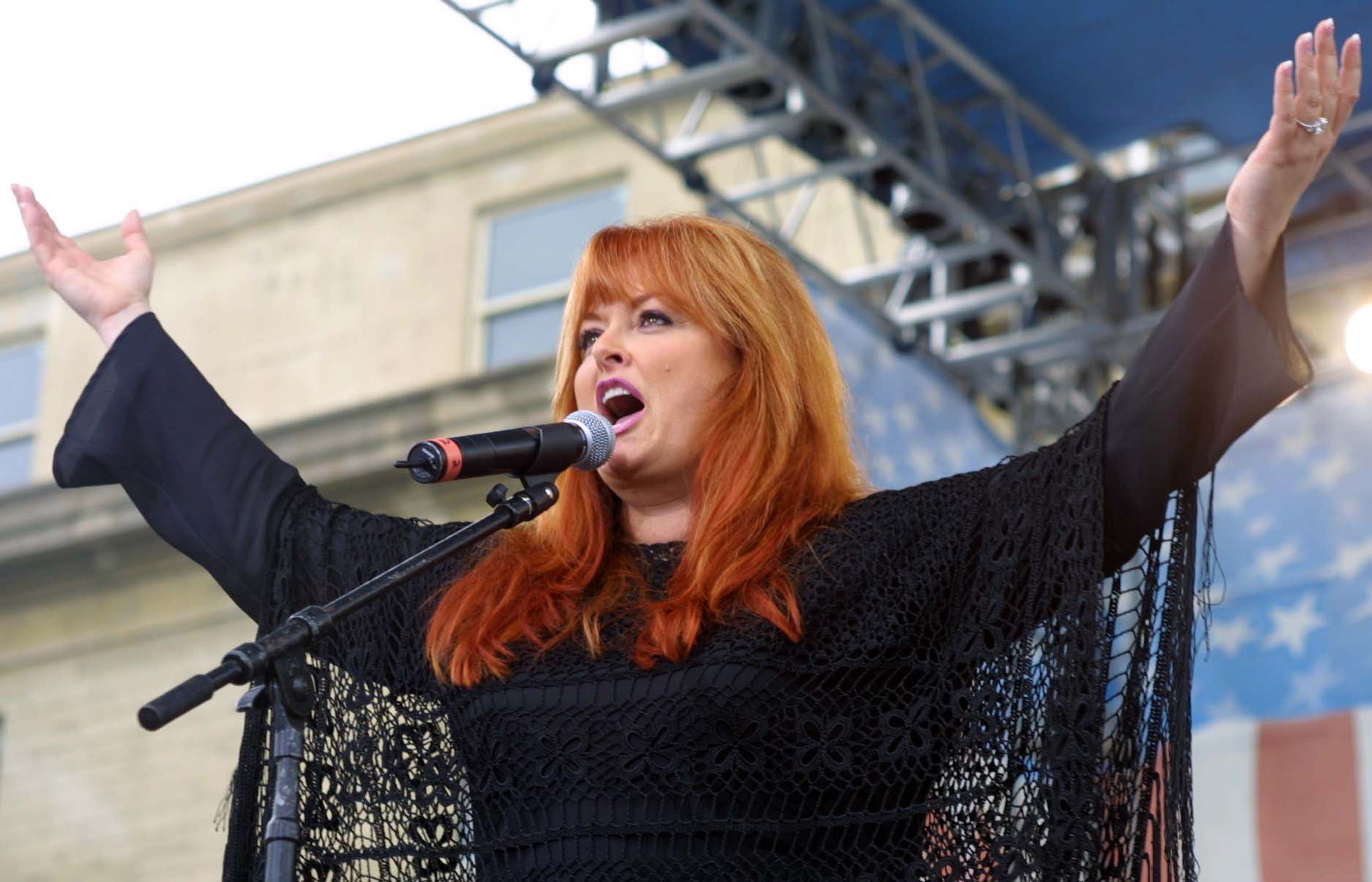
Wynonna spent eight weeks at number one in 1992.

Hot Country Songs is a chart that ranks the top-performing country music songs in the United States, published by Billboard magazine. In 1992, 25 different songs topped the chart, then published under the title Hot Country Singles & Tracks, in 52 issues of the magazine, based on weekly airplay data from country music radio stations compiled by Nielsen Broadcast Data Systems.

In early 1992, after performing with her mother in the duo The Judds since the early 1980s, Wynonna Judd, now known mononymously as Wynonna, launched her solo career and achieved immediate success. She topped the Hot Country Singles & Tracks chart with her debut single "She Is His Only Need" and followed it up before the end of the year with two more chart-toppers with "I Saw the Light" and "No One Else on Earth". The three songs spent a total of eight weeks at number one, the most by any act in 1992. Alan Jackson was the only other artist to achieve three number ones during the year, but his three chart-toppers, "Dallas", "Love's Got a Hold on You" and "She's Got the Rhythm (And I Got the Blues)", spent only four weeks in total at the top of the chart. Brooks & Dunn, Collin Raye, Garth Brooks and Vince Gill each reached number one with two songs.

In addition to Wynonna, four other artists reached number one for the first time in 1992. Collin Raye was the first, moving into the top spot on the first chart of the year with "Love, Me". Raye's song was replaced at number one three weeks later by Tracy Lawrence's "Sticks and Stones", another first-time chart-topper. Aaron Tippin gained his first number one with "There Ain't Nothin' Wrong with the Radio" in April, and Billy Ray Cyrus achieved the same feat in May with "Achy Breaky Heart", which had the longest unbroken run at the top of the chart in 1992, spending five weeks at number one. The final number one of the year was "Don't Let Our Love Start Slippin' Away" by Vince Gill.

== Chart history ==
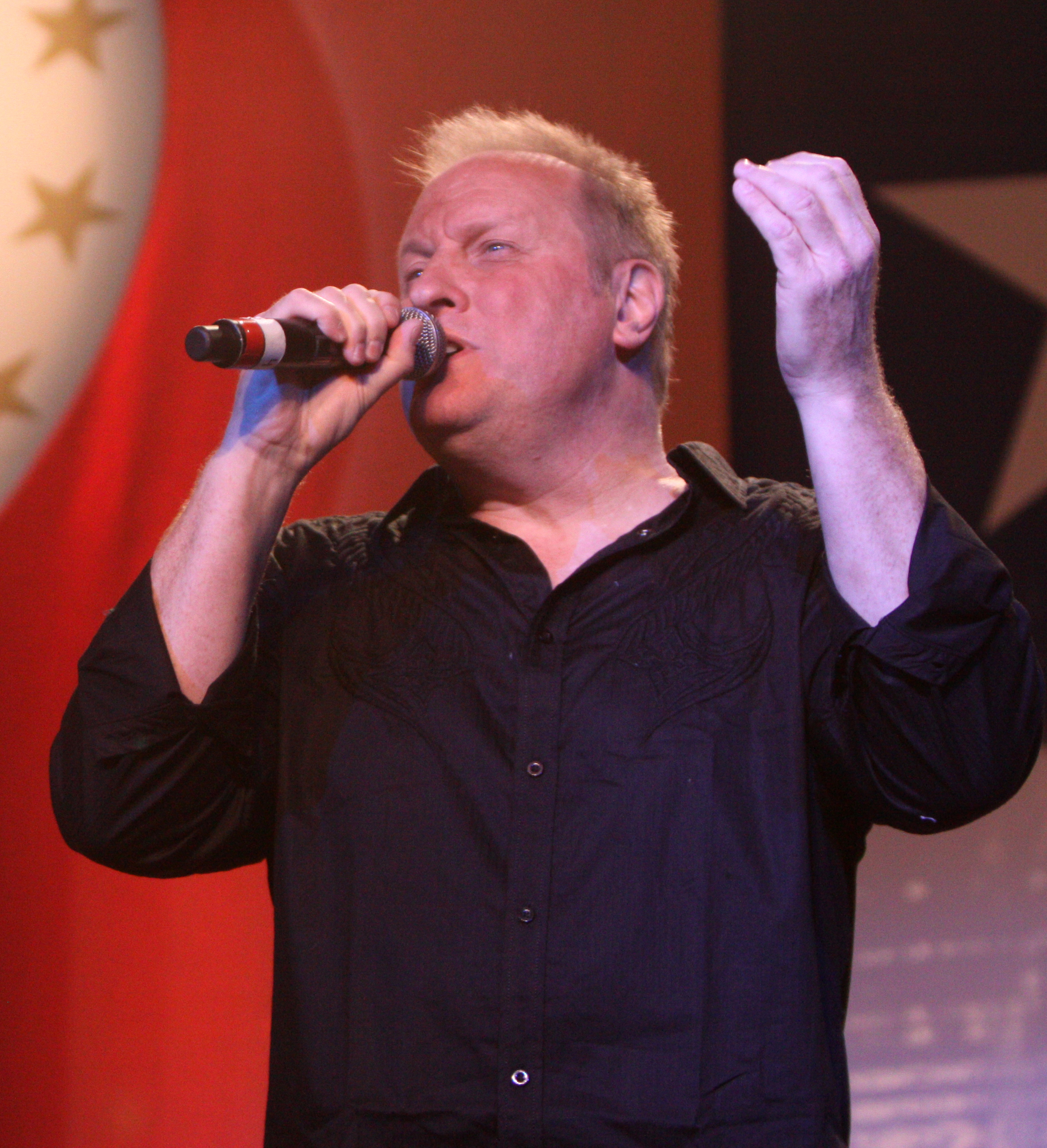
Collin Raye was at number one on the first chart of the new year and returned to the top spot in October.

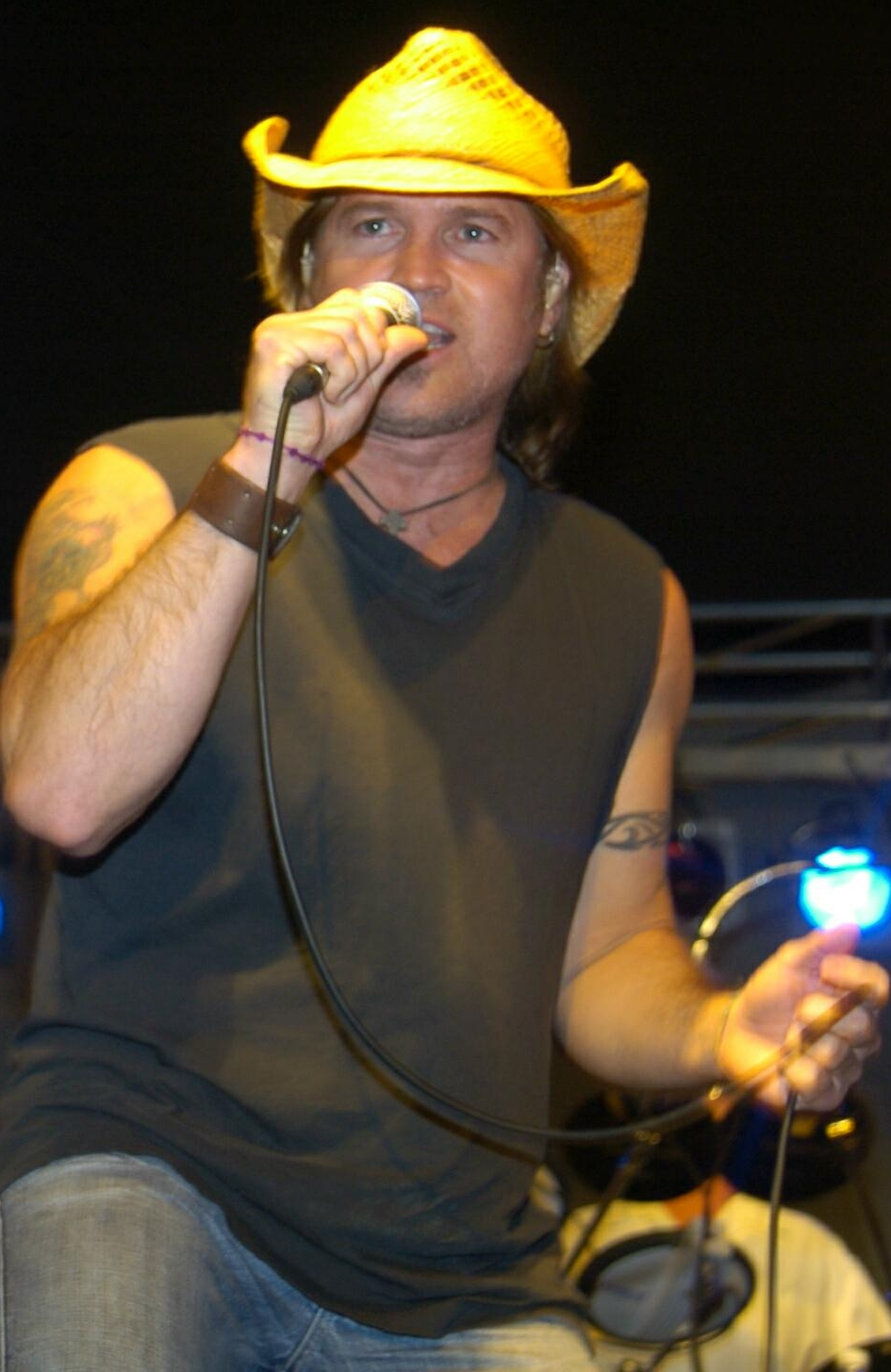
Billy Ray Cyrus had a five-week run at number one with "Achy Breaky Heart".

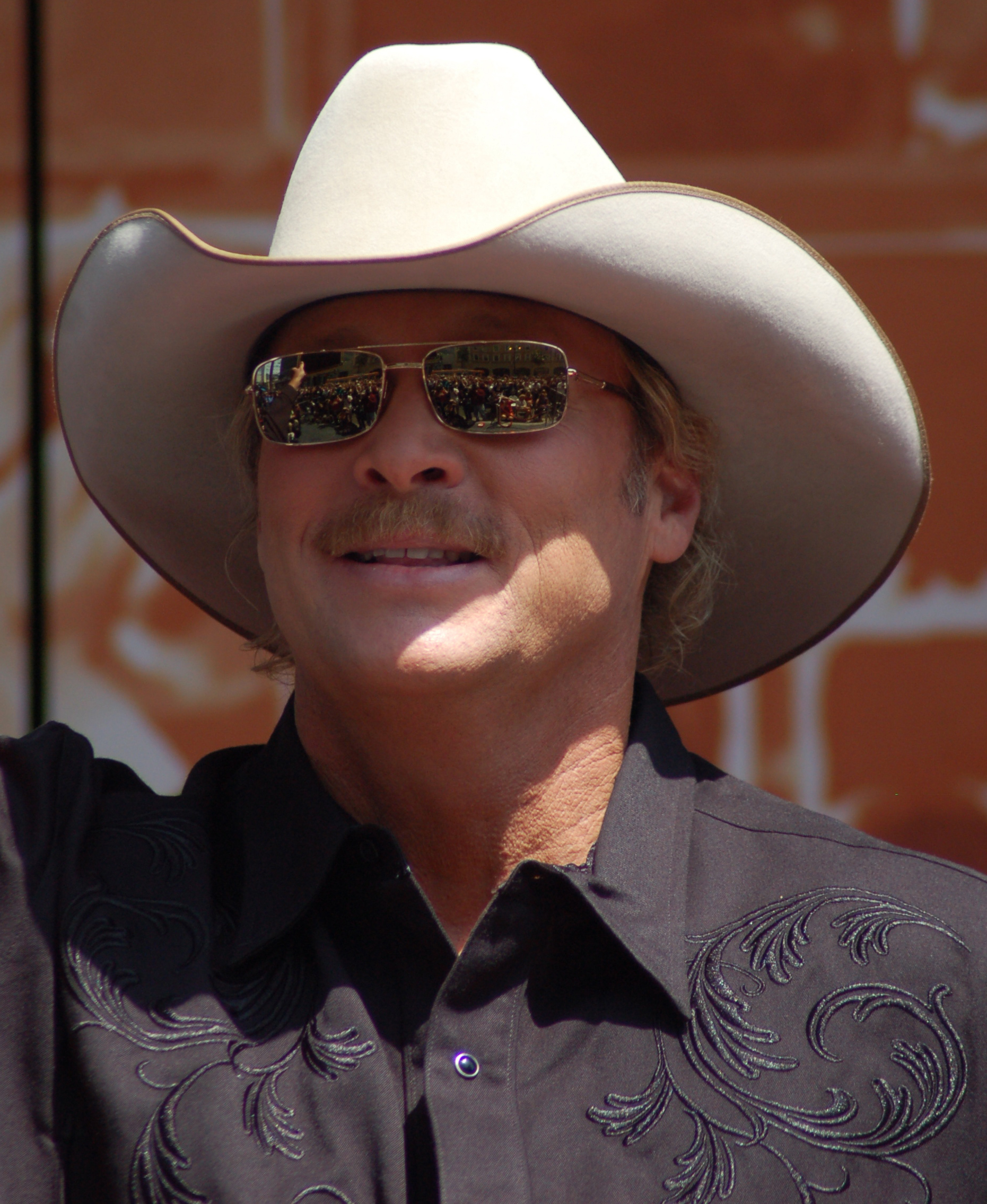
Alan Jackson had three number ones in 1992.

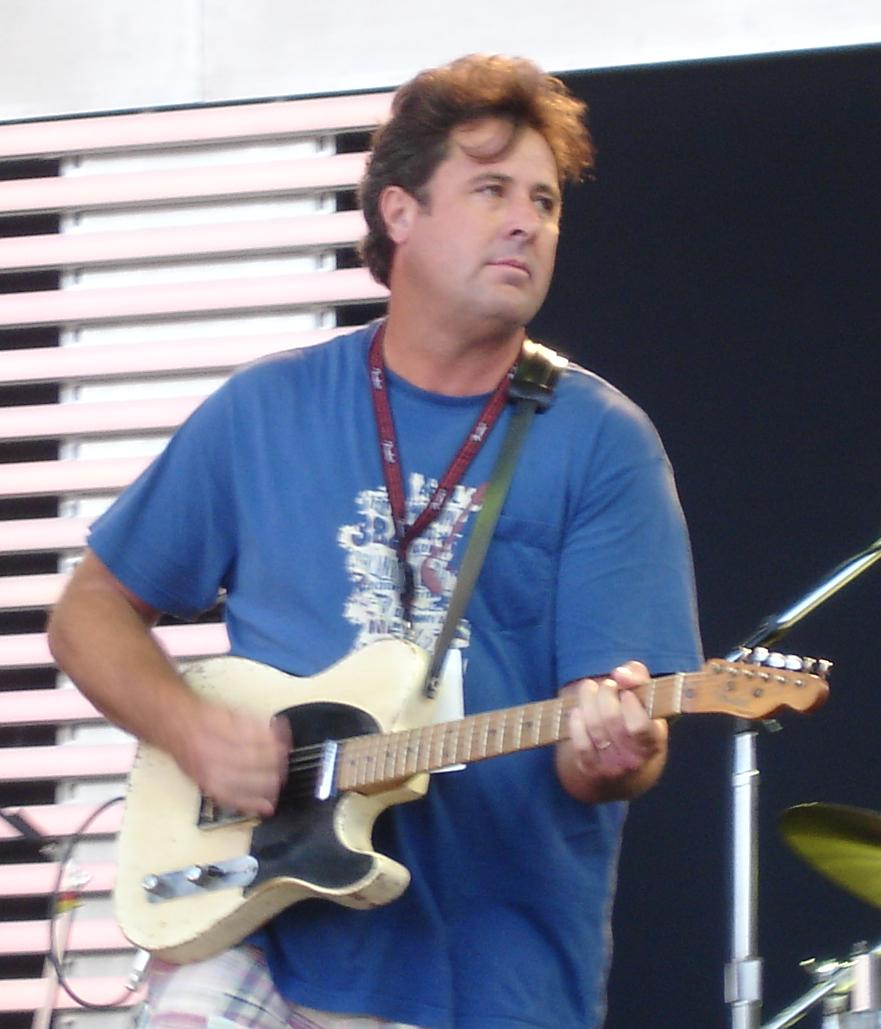
Vince Gill ended the year at number one.

Issue date	Title	Artist(s)	Ref.
January 4	"Love, Me"	Collin Raye	
January 11	"Love, Me"	Collin Raye	
January 18	"Love, Me"	Collin Raye	
January 25	"Sticks and Stones"	Tracy Lawrence	
February 1	"A Jukebox with a Country Song"	Doug Stone	
February 8	"A Jukebox with a Country Song"	Doug Stone	
February 15	"What She's Doing Now"	Garth Brooks	
February 22	"What She's Doing Now"	Garth Brooks	
February 29	"What She's Doing Now"	Garth Brooks	
March 7	"What She's Doing Now"	Garth Brooks	
March 14	"Straight Tequila Night"	John Anderson	
March 21	"Dallas"	Alan Jackson	
March 28	"Is There Life Out There"	Reba McEntire	
April 4	"Is There Life Out There"	Reba McEntire	
April 11	"She Is His Only Need"	Wynonna	
April 18	"There Ain't Nothin' Wrong with the Radio"	Aaron Tippin	
April 25	"There Ain't Nothin' Wrong with the Radio"	Aaron Tippin	
May 2	"There Ain't Nothin' Wrong with the Radio"	Aaron Tippin	
May 9	"Neon Moon"	Brooks & Dunn	
May 16	"Neon Moon"	Brooks & Dunn	
May 23	"Some Girls Do"	Sawyer Brown	
May 30	"Achy Breaky Heart"	Billy Ray Cyrus	
June 6	"Achy Breaky Heart"	Billy Ray Cyrus	
June 13	"Achy Breaky Heart"	Billy Ray Cyrus	
June 20	"Achy Breaky Heart"	Billy Ray Cyrus	
June 27	"Achy Breaky Heart"	Billy Ray Cyrus	
July 4	"I Saw the Light"	Wynonna	
July 11	"I Saw the Light"	Wynonna	
July 18	"I Saw the Light"	Wynonna	
July 25	"The River"	Garth Brooks	
August 1	"Boot Scootin' Boogie"	Brooks & Dunn	
August 8	"Boot Scootin' Boogie"	Brooks & Dunn	
August 15	"Boot Scootin' Boogie"	Brooks & Dunn	
August 22	"Boot Scootin' Boogie"	Brooks & Dunn	
August 29	"I'll Think of Something"	Mark Chesnutt	
September 5	"I Still Believe in You"	Vince Gill	
September 12	"I Still Believe in You"	Vince Gill	
September 19	"Love's Got a Hold on You"	Alan Jackson	
September 26	"Love's Got a Hold on You"	Alan Jackson	
October 3	"In This Life"	Collin Raye	
October 10	"In This Life"	Collin Raye	
October 17	"If I Didn't Have You"	Randy Travis	
October 24	"No One Else on Earth"	Wynonna	
October 31	"No One Else on Earth"	Wynonna	
November 7	"No One Else on Earth"	Wynonna	
November 14	"No One Else on Earth"	Wynonna	
November 21	"I'm in a Hurry (And Don't Know Why)"	Alabama	
November 28	"I'm in a Hurry (And Don't Know Why)"	Alabama	
December 5	"I Cross My Heart"	George Strait	
December 12	"I Cross My Heart"	George Strait	
December 19	"She's Got the Rhythm (And I Got the Blues)"	Alan Jackson	
December 26	"Don't Let Our Love Start Slippin' Away"	Vince Gill	

== See also ==
- 1992 in music
- List of artists who reached number one on the U.S. country chart
