= Black Tie (group) =

American country rock supergroup

- Origin: United States
- Genres: Country rock
- Years active: 1985-2007
- Labels: Bench, Mastering Pro
- Past members: Jimmy Griffin; Randy Meisner; Billy Swan

Black Tie was an American country rock supergroup formed by Jimmy Griffin, Randy Meisner, and Billy Swan. The group's first album, When the Night Falls, was produced by Reggie Fisher and released on LP in 1985 by Bench Records (BR-001) and reissued on CD in 1990 (BRCD-101). For the CD release the band recorded new versions of two tracks from the LP, "Learning the Game", a cover of the Buddy Holly song, and "Chain Gang", a cover of the Sam Cooke song. These tracks were released as a single, and "Learning the Game" reached #59 of the Billboard Hot Country Singles & Tracks chart.

Griffin was formerly a member of the soft rock band Bread, and would later chart five country singles as one-third of The Remingtons. Meisner was formerly a member of Poco, Rick Nelson's Stone Canyon Band, and the Eagles. Swan had several country hits in the 1970s, including the number one country and pop hit "I Can Help".

When Griffin left the group to form the Remingtons, the remaining members, Meisner and Swan, hooked up with Charlie Rich Jr., son and former bandleader for his famous father, and began recording in 1992 under the name Meisner, Swan & Rich. Ten tracks were released on an eponymous CD in April 2000 in Japan (2001 by Varese in the US and 2002 by Rev-Ola in the UK). The same ten songs were reissued in 2006 and 2008 under the title, The Eagle, the Dove and the Gold on the Sonic Past Music label.

In 2006, a 3-song EP was released as Black Tie Two with a version of the classic Christmas carol "Away in a Manger", which had been released to country radio as a Christmas single in the late 1980s. It also included the 1992 Meisner, Swan & Rich single "I'm Sure of You" and "Listen to the Radio".

== Discography ==
=== Studio albums ===
Title	Album details	Peak positions
Title	Album details	US Country
When the Night Falls	Release date: 1985; Label: Bench Records	65

=== Extended plays ===
Title	Album details
Black Tie Two	Release date: August 30, 2006; Label: Masteringpro

=== Singles ===
Year	Single	Peak positions	Album
Year	Single	US Country	Album
1990	"Learning the Game"	59	When the Night Falls
1991	"Chain Gang"	—	When the Night Falls
1992	"I'm Sure of You"	—	Non-album single (as Meisner, Swan & Rich)
"—" denotes releases that did not chart
