= Hydra (Toto album) =

1979 studio album by Toto

Studio album by Toto
- Released: October 26, 1979
- Recorded: June–August 1979
- Studios: Sunset Sound (Hollywood); Additional recording at Reggie's (Los Angeles)
- Genres: Progressive rock, rock, pop
- Length: 41:23
- Label: Columbia
- Producers: Toto; Tom Knox; Reggie Fisher

Toto chronology
Toto (1978)	Hydra (1979)	Turn Back (1981)

Singles from Hydra
- 1. "99" Released: December 3, 1979; 2. "St George and the Dragon" Released: January 4, 1980; 3. "All Us Boys" Released: March 24, 1980

Hydra is the second studio album by American rock band Toto, released in 1979. It reached No. 37 on the Billboard Pop Albums. While most of the album's singles failed to make any impact in the charts, "99", a song inspired by the 1971 science fiction movie THX 1138, reached No. 26 on the Billboard Hot 100.

== Background ==
The album received television promotion through Musikmarkt's Hitparade series. In 1980, CBS had also created a 24-minute four-song video that was filmed over the course of three days. The video, which cost $500,000 to make, included a recreation of a New York sewer to emulate the imagery found on the cover of Hydra.

In 2013, Toto's guitarist Steve Lukather said of the album:

You get successful with something, it’s always the whole thing where you don’t want to repeat it. So we tried something a little different with Hydra, and it sold well, although it might have been a little bit rushed for us. And here's some irony for you -- Rolling Stone beat up on the first album, and then when they reviewed Hydra, the opening line of the review is something like, "It doesn’t have the magic of the first album." We're immediately pissing ourselves on the floor with laughter. Who are these cats? Do they think we have amnesia? We were just following our muses, man. We were following our own rules and we didn't want to listen to anybody.

== Critical reception ==
Professional ratings
Review scores
Source	Rating
AllMusic	3.5/5 stars
MusicHound Rock: The Essential Album Guide	3/5 stars
Record Mirror	4/5 stars
The Rolling Stone Album Guide	1/5 stars

Though a commercial success, Hydra was a far less popular album than the band's top-selling debut. Record World felt that that the album possessed "an even broader range" than their debut album with "some prime pop and rock material". Cashbox described it as "more adventuresome than the first album" with "some fine excursions into progressive rock." Billboard said that the album had a "professional yet energetic, rock sound" and highlighted Lukather's guitar playing as "breathtaking".

Robin Smith of Record Mirror referred to Hydra as "another fine album" from Toto, adding that the song was "big on everything" with "escapism into a storybook world of knights and dragons". Record Business thought that Hydra demonstrated the band's ability to make "superb music", which they said was best showcased on "St. George and the Dragon", "All Us Boys", and the title track.

In a retrospective review AllMusic suggested this was due to Toto's failure to establish a distinctive, recognizable sound on either Hydra or their debut, which would have allowed listeners to immediately identify Toto's major hits with the band themselves.

== Track listing ==
All tracks are written by David Paich, except where noted.

Side one
No.	Title	Writer(s)	Lead vocals	Length
1.	"Hydra"	Paich, Steve Porcaro, Jeff Porcaro, Steve Lukather, Bobby Kimball, David Hungate	Paich	7:31
2.	"St. George and the Dragon"		Kimball, Paich	4:45
3.	"99"		Lukather	5:16
4.	"Lorraine"		Paich	4:46

Side two
No.	Title	Writer(s)	Lead vocals	Length
5.	"All Us Boys"		Paich	5:03
6.	"Mama"	Paich, Kimball	Kimball	5:14
7.	"White Sister"	Paich, Kimball	Kimball	5:39
8.	"A Secret Love"	S. Porcaro, Paich, Kimball	S. Porcaro, Kimball	3:07

== Personnel ==
Toto

- Bobby Kimball – lead vocals (2, 6–8), backing vocals
- Steve Lukather – guitars, lead vocals (3), backing vocals
- David Paich – piano, keyboards, organ, lead vocals (1, 2, 4, 5), backing vocals
- Steve Porcaro – keyboards, synthesizers, electronics, Chamberlin (3), lead vocals (8)
- David Hungate – bass, guitars (5)
- Jeff Porcaro – drums, percussion

Additional musicians

- Lenny Castro – percussion
- Joe Porcaro – percussion
- Marty Paich – string arrangements
- Michael Boddicker – synthesizer samples
- Roger Linn – assistant synthesizer programming

Technical

- Produced by Toto, Tom Knox, and Reggie Fisher
- Engineered and mixed by Tom Knox and Dana Latham
- Assistant engineer – Stephen McManus
- Mastered by David Donnelly
- Art direction – Jim Hagopian, Tony Lane, and Jeff "Artful Dodger" Porcaro
- Photography – Jim Hagopian
- Calligraphy – Mike Manoogian
- Label design – Philip Garris

== Singles ==
- "99" / "Hydra"
- "St George and the Dragon" / "A Secret Love"
- "All Us Boys" / "Hydra" (released in US)

== Charts ==
=== Weekly charts ===
Chart (1979–1980)	Peak position
Australian Albums (Kent Music Report)	41
Canada Top Albums/CDs (RPM)	10
German Albums (Offizielle Top 100)	38
Japanese Albums (Oricon)	37
New Zealand Albums (RMNZ)	29
Norwegian Albums (VG-lista)	1
Swedish Albums (Sverigetopplistan)	15
US Billboard 200	37

=== Year-end charts ===
Chart (1980)	Peak position
Canada Top Albums/CDs (RPM)	52
US Billboard 200	67

== Certifications ==
Region	Certification	Certified units/sales
Canada (Music Canada)	Platinum	100,000^{^}
United States (RIAA)	Gold	500,000^{^}
^{^} Shipments figures based on certification alone.
