= Aim for the Heart =

Studio album by The Remingtons
- Released: April 6, 1993
- Genre: Country
- Length: 32:34
- Label: BNA
- Producers: Larry Michael Lee; Josh Leo

The Remingtons chronology
Blue Frontier (1991)	Aim for the Heart (1993)

Aim for the Heart is the second and final album from the American country music trio The Remingtons. Released in April 1993 on BNA Entertainment, the album produced two singles on the Billboard country singles charts: "Nobody Loves You When You're Free" at No. 52 and "Wall Around Her Heart" at No. 69. "Everything I Own" is a cover of a song originally recorded by Bread on their 1972 album Baby, I'm a Want You, and "Ride 'Em Cowboy" was a single for Paul Davis in 1974.

For this album, Denny Henson had replaced Rick Yancey as the band's third vocalist, although Yancey still played acoustic guitar on "Everything I Own" and co-wrote several songs on the album.

== Critical reception ==
Professional ratings
Review scores
Source	Rating
Allmusic	3/5 stars
Entertainment Weekly	F

Roch Parisien of Allmusic wrote that "I honestly can't say that anything here improves on last year's debut...But if the idea of Bread with pedal steel meets the quieter side of The Desert Rose Band appeals to you..." Entertainment Weekly critic Alanna Nash rated the album "F", writing that "Imagine if three of the blandest pretenders to the country-music throne formed a band to record covers of past hits and write instantly forgettable country-pop radio fare."

== Track listing ==
1. "I'm Gonna Find a Way" (Jimmy Griffin, Richard Mainegra, Rick Yancey) – 2:07
2. "Nobody Loves You When You're Free" (Griffin, Mainegra, Yancey) – 3:10
3. "I Can't Say That Anymore" (Terry Brown, Casey Kelly, Curtis Wayne) – 3:29
4. "Ride 'Em Cowboy" (Paul Davis) – 3:22
5. "Everything I Own" (David Gates) – 3:11
6. "It's Time to Shine" (Mainegra, Rick Bowles) – 2:58
7. "Lucky Boy" (Robb Royer) – 3:05
8. "Wall Around Her Heart" (Denny Henson, Steven K. Wilson) – 4:03
9. "Some Hearts" (Mainegra, Kelly, Tom Campbell) – 3:18
10. "She's All I've Got Going Now" (Griffin, Mainegra, Yancey) – 3:51

== Personnel ==
Compiled from Aim for the Heart liner notes.

The Remingtons

- Jimmy Griffin - lead vocals ("I'm Gonna Find a Way", "Ride 'Em Cowboy", "Lucky Boy", "Everything I Own", and "She's All I've Got Going Now"); background vocals (all other tracks); acoustic guitar
- Denny Henson - lead vocals ("Nobody Loves You When You're Free" and "Wall Around Her Heart"); background vocals (all other tracks)
- Richard Mainegra - lead vocals ("I Can't Say That Anymore", "Some Hearts", and "It's Time to Shine"); background vocals (all other tracks); acoustic guitar

Additional musicians

- Eddie Bayers - drums, percussion
- Sam Bush - fiddle, mandolin
- Bill Cuomo - synthesizer
- Dan Dugmore - steel guitar
- Rob Hajacos - fiddle
- Bernie Leadon - acoustic guitar
- Craig Krampf - drums, percussion
- Josh Leo - acoustic guitar, electric guitar
- George Marinelli Jr. - electric guitar
- Steve Nathan - piano, synthesizer, Hammond B-3 organ, accordion
- Michael Rhodes - bass guitar
- Biff Watson - acoustic guitar
- Lonnie Wilson - drums, percussion
- Glenn Worf - bass guitar
- Rick Yancey - acoustic guitar on "Everything I Own"

Personnel

- Jeff Giedt - recording
- Larry Michael Lee - production
- Josh Leo - production
- Steve Marcantonio - recording, mixing
- Denny Purcell - mastering
