= Reggie Fisher =

American record producer

Reggie Fisher (born January 22, 1948) is an American record producer. Fisher worked with many popular artists on recordings that encompassed blues, jazz, pop, rock, country and soul records.

== Career ==
=== Early years ===
Born in Englewood, New Jersey, and raised in New Canaan, Connecticut, Fisher arrived in Los Angeles in 1971.

=== Music ===
Fisher took a job at United Artists Records, where he became a recording engineer and recorded artists such as John Buck Wilkins, Rita Coolidge, Brenda Russell, Sly Stone, Bobby Womack, The Curtis Brothers, Waylon Jennings, Pablo Cruz, and Michael Jackson.

Beginning in the early 1970s, Fisher worked as a producer, recording albums by many artists including Ernie Watts, T-Bone Burnett, Los Lobos, Black Tie, and Toto.

In 1980, Fisher financed and produced T-Bone Burnett's first solo album, Truth Decay. He went on to finance and co-produce two more of Burnett's solo albums, Trap Door EP, released in 1982 on the Warner Brothers label, and "Behind the Trap Door", released in 1986. Around the same time, Fisher also formed the supergroup "Black Tie," which featured Jimmy Griffin, Randy Meisner, and Billy Swan, as well as an impressive list of musicians. Black Tie recorded two albums. The first (When The Night Falls) featured T Bone Burnett, and their single (A Buddy Holly Cover) "Learning The Game" rose to #59 in the Billboard charts.

In 1991, after watching Charlie Rich, Jr. perform at the Palomino Club, Fisher offered Rich a recording contract, requesting that Charlie, Jr. be a component in the superstar ensemble Fisher was still promoting (Black Tie). Their follow-up album, which included the single "I'm Sure of You" (which was co-written by Rich and Billy Swan), featured Rich, Jr. as a vocalist. The record also topped the charts in 1993.

In 2012 Reggie Fisher met and collaborated with English Guitarist Darren Clarke to restore some vintage cassette recordings of East Coast Piano player Rob Perkin. This Instrumental project was released years later, and the songs that Fisher worked on can be heard on the first Everglades Rhythm record.
