= Tender Loving Care (Tom Jones album) =

Studio album by Tom Jones
- Released: 1985
- Genre: Country
- Label: Mercury

Tom Jones chronology
Love Is on the Radio (1984)	Tender Loving Care (1985)	At This Moment (1989)

Professional ratings
Review scores
Source	Rating
AllMusic	2/5 stars

Tender Loving Care is a studio album by Welsh singer Tom Jones, released in 1985 by Mercury Records.

== Track listing ==
LP (Mercury 826 140-1)

Side 1
No.	Title	Length
1.	"Not Another Heart Song"
2.	"That's All That Matters"
3.	"It's Four in the Morning"
4.	"Dallas Darlin'"
5.	"TLC"

Side 2
No.	Title	Length
1.	"I Can Help"
2.	"A Million Times Today"
3.	"Love Burned a Hole in the Night"
4.	"Still Enough of Us"
5.	"Hold Me to It"

== Charts ==
Chart (1984)	Peak position
US Top Country Albums (Billboard)	54
