= I Could Love You (With My Eyes Closed) =

Single by The Remingtons

from the album Blue Frontier
- B-side: "Take a Little Love"
- Released: February 15, 1992
- Genre: Country
- Length: 2:41
- Label: BNA
- Songwriters: Richard Mainegra, Rick Yancey
- Producers: Larry Michael Lee, Josh Leo

The Remingtons singles chronology
"A Long Time Ago" (1991)	"I Could Love You (With My Eyes Closed)" (1992)	"Two-Timin' Me" (1992)

"I Could Love You (With My Eyes Closed)" is a song recorded by American country music group The Remingtons. It was released in February 1992 as the second single from the album Blue Frontier. The song reached #33 on the Billboard Hot Country Singles & Tracks chart. The song was written by group members Richard Mainegra and Rick Yancey.

== Critical reception ==
Lisa Smith and Cyndi Hoelzle of Gavin Report praised the song's vocal harmonies.

== Chart performance ==
Chart (1992)	Peak position
US Hot Country Songs (Billboard)	33
Canadian RPM Country Tracks	35
