= Don't Let Our Dreams Die Young =

Studio album by Tom Jones
- Released: 1983
- Genre: Country
- Label: Mercury

Tom Jones chronology
Tom Jones Country (1982)	Don't Let Our Dreams Die Young (1983)	Love Is on the Radio (1984)

Professional ratings
Review scores
Source	Rating
AllMusic	3/5 stars

Don't Let Our Dreams Die Young is a studio album by Welsh singer Tom Jones, released in 1983 by Mercury Records.

== Track listing ==
LP (Mercury 814 448-1 M-1)

Side 1
No.	Title	Length
1.	"You've Got a Right"
2.	"The One I Sing My Love Songs To"
3.	"This Ain't Tennessee and She Ain't You"
4.	"I've Been Rained On Too"
5.	"You Are No Angel"

Side 2
No.	Title	Length
1.	"Don't Let Our Dreams Die Young"
2.	"This Time"
3.	"That Old Piano"
4.	"Loving Arms of Tennessee"
5.	"You Lay a Whole Lot of Love on Me"

== Charts ==
Chart (1983)	Peak position
US Top Country Albums (Billboard)	9
