= 99 (song) =

1979 single by Toto

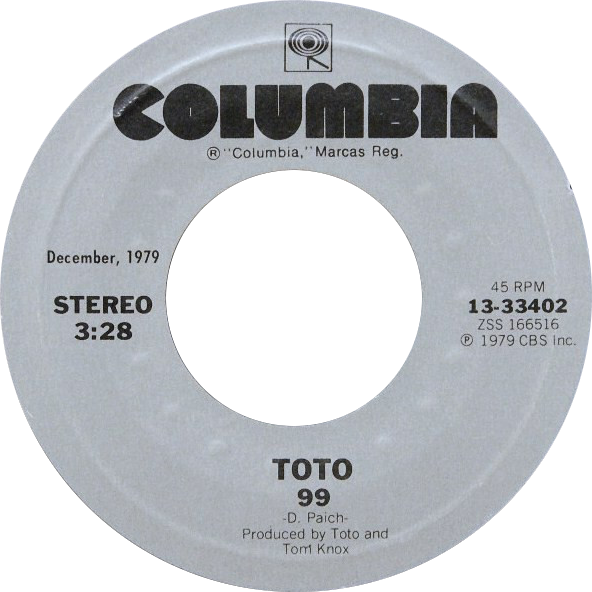
- US reissue

Single by Toto

from the album Hydra
- B-side: "Hydra"
- Released: December 3, 1979
- Recorded: Summer 1979
- Genre: Blue-eyed soul; adult contemporary
- Length: 3:28 (single version); 5:16 (album version); 4:03 (video version)
- Label: Columbia
- Songwriter: David Paich
- Producers: Toto; Tom Knox

Toto singles chronology
"Rockmaker" (1979)	"99" (1979)	"St. George and the Dragon" (1980)

Music video
- "99" on YouTube

"99" is a song by the American rock band Toto. The song appeared on the Hydra album in 1979. As a single, it reached #17 on the Cash Box Top 100 yet stalled at #26 on the Billboard Hot 100 chart. In Canada, the song peaked at number 17 on the RPM singles chart.

The full album version of the song includes a gentle piano-driven ride out, while the single edit fades the song out before that part. Many years later, Steve Lukather confessed that he didn't like "99" and said that it was one of his least favorite of the band's songs, which is why it was rarely performed after the Hydra Tour.

== Development ==
The song was written as a tribute to George Lucas's film THX 1138, and the music video resembles a scene from the movie.

In the video, as in the movie scene where the main character (named "THX 1138" and nicknamed "Thex") is imprisoned, the room is completely white, and all characters wear white jumpsuits. Toto Legend, the former official International Toto Fan Club newsletter, reviewed the video:

'99' was predominantly a performance video, though the set design was rather conceptual. Following David Paich's intention regarding the lyrics... various sized sculptured 99's hanging and standing about, and the band was clad in futuristic white jumpsuits. There were some notable shots in this one — keyboard close-ups and an artistic view of Jeff through a transparent drum head, a technique that several popular videos have copied since.

== Reception ==
Record World praised Lukather's vocal and said that "Slick production wraps the keyboard-laden love song in a perfect AOR-pop package."

== Personnel ==
=== Toto ===
- Steve Lukather – lead and backing vocals, guitars
- Bobby Kimball – backing vocals
- David Paich – piano, backing vocals
- Steve Porcaro – synthesizers
- David Hungate – bass
- Jeff Porcaro – drums
- Lenny Castro – percussion

== Release history ==
Region	Date	Ref.
United States	December 3, 1979	
United Kingdom	February 29, 1980	
Europe	April 1980	
