= Country (Tom Jones album) =

Tom Jones Country

Studio album by Tom Jones
- Released: 1982
- Genre: Country
- Label: Mercury

Tom Jones chronology
Darlin' (1981)	Tom Jones Country (1982)	Don't Let Our Dreams Die Young (1983)

Professional ratings
Review scores
Source	Rating
Billboard	"Recommended LPs" pick

Tom Jones Country, or simply Country, is a studio album by Welsh singer Tom Jones, released in 1982 by Mercury Records.

== Track listing ==
LP (Mercury SRM-1-4062)

Side 1
No.	Title	Writer(s)	Length
1.	"I Don't Want to Be Alone Tonight"	Shel Silverstein	3:12
2.	"A Woman's Touch"	Jerry Fuller	3:58
3.	"If I Ever Had to Say Goodbye to You"	Steve Gibb	3:08
4.	"We're Wasting Our Time"	Jack Williams	3:35
5.	"Somebody's Cryin'"	Hilka Maria Cornelius / Harald Steinhauer	3:09

Side 2
No.	Title	Writer(s)	Length
1.	"Marie"	Larry Brown	2:45
2.	"My Last Goodbye"	R. Canter / F. Canter	3:05
3.	"Touch Me (I'll Be Your Fool Once More)"	Al Downing	3:31
4.	"We Could Be the Closest of Friends"	S. Tippin / J. Slate	3:50
5.	"It'll Be Me"	Jack Clement	2:50

== Charts ==
Chart (1982)	Peak position
US Top Country Albums (Billboard)	21
