= Wynonna (album) =

Studio album by Wynonna Judd
- Released: March 31, 1992
- Recorded: 1991
- Studios: Emerald Sound Studios, Sixteenth Avenue Sound, Backstage Studio and Paul Kennerley's house (Nashville, Tennessee)
- Genre: Country
- Length: 37:33
- Labels: Curb; MCA
- Producers: Tony Brown; Paul Kennerley

Wynonna Judd chronology
Wynonna (1992)	Tell Me Why (1993)

Singles from Wynonna
- 1. "She Is His Only Need" Released: January 28, 1992; 2. "I Saw the Light" Released: May 4, 1992; 3. "No One Else on Earth" Released: August 25, 1992; 4. "My Strongest Weakness" Released: December 5, 1992

Professional ratings
Review scores
Source	Rating
AllMusic	3/5 stars
Robert Christgau	(choice cut)
Entertainment Weekly	C+
Los Angeles Times	2.5/4 stars
Q	3/5 stars
Rolling Stone	4/5 stars

Wynonna is the debut solo studio album by American country music artist Wynonna Judd, released on March 31, 1992, via MCA Records in association with Curb Records.

Prior to the release of Wynonna, Judd was part of the massively successful duo, the Judds, which consisted of her and her mother Naomi Judd. They were one of the biggest acts in country in the 1980s until the duo disbanded in 1991 following Naomi's hepatitis diagnosis. Production on Wynonna was handled by Tony Brown except "Live with Jesus", which was produced by Paul Kennerley.

Wynonna received mostly favorable reviews from music critics upon its release and became one of the best selling country albums of all time by a female artist. All of the album's four singles topped either the Billboard or Radio & Records country airplay charts, with "I Saw the Light" becoming the number one country song of 1992 according to Billboard. The album has gone on to become certified 5× platinum in the United States and is to date, Wynonna's best selling album.

== Content ==
The album's first three singles, "She Is His Only Need", "I Saw the Light", "No One Else on Earth", topped the US Billboard Hot Country Songs, for a combined total of eight weeks, while the album's final single "My Strongest Weakness" also cracked the top five of the chart. "When I Reach the Place I'm Goin'" was later recorded by Patty Loveless for the 1994 compilation album Red Hot + Country and on her 2005 album Dreamin' My Dreams. "It's Never Easy to Say Goodbye" was later recorded by Kenny Chesney on his 1996 album Me and You.

== Track listing ==
Wynonna track listing
No.	Title	Writer(s)	Length
1.	"What It Takes"	Brendan Croker	4:17
2.	"She Is His Only Need"	Dave Loggins	4:27
3.	"I Saw the Light"	Andrew Gold; Lisa Angelle	3:55
4.	"My Strongest Weakness"	Naomi Judd; Mike Reid	4:22
5.	"When I Reach the Place I'm Goin'"	Emory Gordy Jr.; Joe Henry	2:49
6.	"No One Else on Earth"	Jill Colucci; Stewart Harris; Sam Lorber	4:01
7.	"It's Never Easy to Say Goodbye"	Allen Shamblin; Bernie Nelson	4:59
8.	"A Little Bit of Love (Goes a Long, Long Way)"	Marty Stuart; Kostas	2:59
9.	"All of That Love from Here"	Lynn Langham; Kris Bergsnes; Sharon Rose Higgins	3:26
10.	"Live with Jesus"	Paul Kennerley	2:18
Total length:			37:33

== Personnel ==
As listed in liner notes.

- Wynonna Judd – lead vocals, backing vocals (2, 5, 8)
- John Barlow Jarvis – keyboards (1, 9)
- Steve Nathan – keyboards (2–4, 6, 8, 9)
- Matt Rollings – keyboards (2–4, 6–8)
- Barry Beckett – keyboards (7)
- Paul Kennerley – all instruments (10), backing vocals (10)
- George Marinelli – electric guitar (1, 9)
- Don Potter – acoustic guitar (1–5, 7–9), MIDI acoustic guitar (5), electric guitar (6)
- Steuart Smith – acoustic guitar (1, 5, 9), electric guitar (1–4, 6–8)
- Sam Bush – mandolin (7, 9)
- Marty Stuart – electric guitar (8)
- Leland Sklar – bass (1, 9)
- Willie Weeks – bass (2–8)
- Rick Marotta – drums (1, 9)
- Eddie Bayers – drums (2–8)
- Dave Loggins – backing vocals (2)
- Judy Rodman – backing vocals (2)
- Andrew Gold – backing vocals (3)
- Naomi Judd – backing vocals (5)
- John Cowan – backing vocals (6)
- Jonell Mosser – backing vocals (6, 8)
- Gary Chapman – backing vocals (7)
- Donna McElroy – backing vocals (7)

Production

- Tony Brown – producer (1–9)
- Paul Kennerley – producer (10), recording
- Don Potter – associate producer
- Chuck Ainlay – recording, overdubs, mixing, mastering
- Steve Tillisch – recording
- Brad Gilderman – overdubs
- Russ Martin – overdubs, second engineer
- Jeff Coppage – second engineer
- Karen Eckhoff – second engineer
- Jason Garner – second engineer
- Mel Jones – second engineer
- Craig White – second engineer
- Denny Purcell – mastering at Georgetown Masters (Nashville, Tennessee)
- Jessie Noble – project coordinator
- Team Design, Inc. – art direction and design
- Andy Engel – hand lettering
- Peter Nash – photography
- Jim Kemp – director of creative services
- Earl Cox/Trumps – hair
- Mary Beth Felts – make-up
- Vanessa Ware – styling

== Charts ==
=== Weekly charts ===
Weekly chart performance for Wynonna
Chart (1992)	Peak position
Canada Top Albums/CDs (RPM)	43
Canadian Country Albums (RPM)	1
US Billboard 200	4
US Top Country Albums (Billboard)	1

=== Year-end charts ===
1992 year-end chart performance for Wynonna
Chart (1992)	Position
Canadian Country Albums (RPM)	3
US Billboard 200	29
US Top Country Albums (Billboard)	6

1993 year-end chart performance for Wynonna
Chart (1993)	Position
Canadian Country Albums (RPM)	50
US Billboard 200	64
US Top Country Albums (Billboard)	12

1994 year-end chart performance for Wynonna
Chart (1994)	Position
US Top Country Albums (Billboard)	68

== Certifications ==
Region	Certification	Certified units/sales
Canada (Music Canada)	2× Platinum	200,000^{^}
United States (RIAA)	5× Platinum	5,000,000^{^}
^{^} Shipments figures based on certification alone.
