= Love Is on the Radio (album) =

Studio album by Tom Jones
- Released: 1984
- Label: Mercury

Tom Jones chronology
Don't Let Our Dreams Die Young (1983)	Love Is on the Radio (1984)	Tender Loving Care (1985)

Professional ratings
Review scores
Source	Rating
AllMusic	2/5 stars

Love Is on the Radio is a studio album by Welsh singer Tom Jones, released in 1984 by Mercury Records.

== Track listing ==
LP (Mercury 822 701-1)

Side 1
No.	Title	Length
1.	"My Kind of Girl"
2.	"All the Love Is on the Radio"
3.	"That Runaway Woman of Mine"
4.	"Give Her All te Roses (Don't Wait Until Tomorrow)"
5.	"Bad Love"

Side 2
No.	Title	Length
1.	"A Picture of You"
2.	"The Moonlight Hours"
3.	"Still a Friend of Mine"
4.	"Only My Heart Knows"
5.	"I'm an Old Rock and Roller (Dancin' to a Different Beat)"

== Charts ==
Chart (1984)	Peak position
US Top Country Albums (Billboard)	40
