= Two-Timin' Me =

Single by The Remingtons

from the album Blue Frontier
- B-side: "That's Easy for Me to Say"
- Released: June 6, 1992
- Genre: Country
- Length: 3:04
- Label: BNA
- Songwriters: Richard Mainegra, Jimmy Griffin, Rick Yancey
- Producers: Larry Michael Lee, Josh Leo

The Remingtons singles chronology
"I Could Love You (With My Eyes Closed)" (1992)	"Two-Timin' Me" (1992)	"Nobody Loves You When You're Free" (1993)

"Two-Timin' Me" is a song by American country music group The Remingtons. It was released in June 1992 as the third single from the album Blue Frontier. The song reached number 18 on the Billboard Hot Country Singles & Tracks chart.

== Content ==
The song is composed in the key of A major with a main chord pattern of A-F♯m7-E-D. Group members Richard Mainegra, Jimmy Griffin, and Rick Yancey wrote the song together.

== Chart performance ==
Chart (1992)	Peak position
Canada Country Singles (RPM)	34
US Hot Country Songs (Billboard)	18
