= Family Tree (1999 film) =

- Directed by: Duane Clark
- Written by: Paul Canterna
- Produced by: Carole Curb Nemoy; Mike Curb
- Starring: Robert Forster; Naomi Judd; Andrew Lawrence; Matthew Lawrence; Cliff Robertson
- Cinematography: John Peters
- Edited by: Matthew Booth
- Music by: Mike Curb; Randy Miller
- Production companies: Curb Entertainment; WarnerVision Films
- Distributed by: Legacy Releasing
- Release dates: October 7, 1999 (Austin Film Festival); April 21, 2000 (United States)
- Running time: 86 minutes
- Country: United States
- Language: English

Family Tree is a 1999 American family drama film directed by Duane Clark and starring Robert Forster, Naomi Judd, Andrew Lawrence, Matthew Lawrence and Cliff Robertson.

== Cast ==
- Robert Forster as Henry Musser
- Naomi Judd as Sarah Musser
- Andrew Lawrence as Mitch "Mess" Musser
- Matthew Lawrence as Mark Musser
- Cliff Robertson as Larry
- Tyler Hoechlin as Jeff Jo
- Jeffrey Pace as Shawn
- Corbin Bleu as Ricky
- Quinn Beswick as Duffy
