= Blue Frontier =

Studio album by the Remingtons
- Released: January 28, 1992
- Recorded: 1991
- Studios: Masterfonics, Nightingale Studios and Sound Emporium, Nashville, Tennessee
- Genre: Country
- Length: 27:55
- Label: BNA
- Producers: Larry Michael Lee; Josh Leo

The Remingtons chronology
Blue Frontier (1992)	Aim for the Heart (1993)

Singles from Blue Frontier
- 1. "A Long Time Ago" Released: October 15, 1991; 2. "I Could Love You (With My Eyes Closed)" Released: February 15, 1992; 3. "Two-Timin' Me" Released: June 6, 1992

Blue Frontier is the debut studio album by American country music trio the Remingtons, a vocal group composed of former Bread vocalist Jimmy Griffin, as well as former Cymarron members Richard Mainegra and Rick Yancey. Released in January 1992 on BNA Entertainment, the album produced three singles on the Billboard country singles charts between late 1991 and mid-1992. In order of release, these were "A Long Time Ago" at No. 10, "I Could Love You (With My Eyes Closed)" at No. 33, and "Two-Timin' Me" at No. 18.

== Critical reception ==
Professional ratings
Review scores
Source	Rating
AllMusic	3/5 stars
Entertainment Weekly	C−

Roch Parisien of AllMusic said that "there's nothing here that will move mountains, but for fans of the Chris Hillman/Desert Rose Band school of harmony-rich country pop, Blue Frontier is for you." Entertainment Weekly reviewer Alanna Nash rated the album "C−", writing that "despite their gorgeous vocal blend, the Remingtons have surprisingly little to say... aside from 'Two-Timin' Me,' a pleasant enough piece of lightweight R&B, and 'A Long Time Ago,' the saga of a sadder-but-wiser lad who opted for fame and fortune over true love, the Remingtons seem content simply to skate on the surface of romantic emotion, perfecting a sugary brand of bubble-gum country."

== Track listing ==
No.	Title	Writer(s)	Length
1.	"Everything to Lose"	Jimmy Griffin, Richard Mainegra, Rick Yancey	2:30
2.	"A Long Time Ago"	Mainegra	2:23
3.	"Eternally Blue"	Griffin, Mainegra, Yancey	2:51
4.	"I Could Love You (With My Eyes Closed)"	Mainegra, Yancey	2:45
5.	"Two-Timin' Me"	Griffin, Mainegra, Yancey	3:06
6.	"After Ours"	Ronnie Caldwell, Mainegra, Yancey	3:21
7.	"When Love at First Sight Goes Blind"	Mainegra, Yancey, Brandon Sinks	2:54
8.	"Takin' the Easy Way Out"	Griffin, Mainegra	2:58
9.	"That's Easy for Me to Say"	Griffin, Mainegra, Yancey	2:48
10.	"Take a Little Love"	Mainegra, Yancey	2:50

== Personnel ==
Compiled from Blue Frontier liner notes.

The Remingtons

- Jimmy Griffin - lead vocals (track 3, 7, 8); background vocals (all other tracks); high-strung guitar (track 1); acoustic guitar (track 4, 5, 8, 9, 10)
- Richard Mainegra - lead vocals (tracks 2, 4, 5, 6), background vocals (all other tracks); acoustic guitar (track 1, 3, 7, 9, 10); acoustic guitar solo (track 3, 4, 9, 10)
- Rick Yancey - lead vocals (track 1, 9, 10); background vocals (all other tracks); acoustic guitar (track 5); acoustic guitar solo (track 8)

Additional musicians

- Larry Byrom - electric guitar (all tracks except 1)
- Paul Franklin - pedal steel guitar (track 1, 3, 4, 5, 7, 9, 10), Pedabro (track 2)
- Bill C. Graham - fiddle (track 4)
- Rob Hajacos - fiddle (track 2, 4, 9, 10)
- John L. Hug - acoustic guitar (track 3, 4, 5, 6, 9)
- Bernie Leadon - acoustic guitar (all tracks), mandolin (track 2, 10), banjo (track 2, 6), tiple (track 2)
- Larry Michael Lee - percussion (track 1)
- Josh Leo - 12-string guitar (track 1), high-strung guitar (track 2, 6, 7), electric guitar (track 5, 10), Leslie guitar (track 8)
- Vince Melamed - organ (track 5, 6, 7, 8)
- Michael Rhodes - bass guitar (track 3, 4, 5, 6, 9)
- Harry Stinson - drums (track 3, 4, 5, 6, 9)
- Billy Thomas - drums (track 1, 2, 7, 8, 10)
- Biff Watson - high-strung guitar (track 1, 8, 10), acoustic guitar (track 2, 7), celesta (track 7)
- Glenn Worf - bass guitar (track 1, 2, 7, 8, 10)

Technical

- Joe Bogan - recording
- Jeff Giedt - recording
- Larry Michael Lee - production
- Josh Leo - production
- Steve Marcantonio - recording, mixing
- Denny Purcell - mastering

== Chart performance ==
Chart (1992)	Peak position
U.S. Billboard Top Country Albums	55
U.S. Billboard Top Heatseekers	23
Canadian RPM Country Albums	18
