= Cymarron =

American soft rock group

- Origin: Memphis, Tennessee, U.S.
- Genres: Soft rock
- Years active: 1971-1972
- Labels: Columbia/Entrance
- Spinoffs: The Remingtons
- Past members: Richard Mainegra; Sherrill Parks; Rick Yancey

Cymarron was an American soft rock band from Memphis, Tennessee. They are most famous for their song "Rings", a number 17 hit in 1971. The recording went to No. 6 on the Billboard Adult Contemporary chart and peaked at number 66 in Australia. "Rings" was also the first single release on Columbia's Entrance label. The band released a follow-up single, "Valerie" which was not as successful, peaking at 96 on the Billboard Hot 100 and 19 on the Adult Contemporary chart. An album, also called "Rings" was released which reached 187 on the Billboard 200 album chart. Cymarron was composed of Rick Yancey (December 31, 1947 – September 10, 2021), Sherrill Parks (July 21, 1948 - July 24, 2022), and Richard Mainegra. They named their group after Cimarron Strip - a short-lived TV western from 1967.

The band's only top 20 hit, "Rings" was written by outside songwriters Eddie Reeves and Alex Harvey, and produced by Chips Moman. Moman had earlier hired Yancey as a studio musician. Yancey wrote the flip-side of their popular single, the song "Like Children". The song "Rings" was subsequently covered by both Lobo and Reuben Howell in 1974. Lobo's version was released as a single which reached 43 on the Billboard Hot 100 and number 8 on the Easy Listening chart. The song was also recorded in 1983 by Leo Kottke for his album, Time Step. Cymarron achieved little other success, despite releasing another album and several other singles.

In 1991, Yancey and Mainegra joined Jimmy Griffin in forming the country music band The Remingtons. Yancey and Griffin also performed together as GYG until Griffin's death in 2005.

Yancey, singer and guitarist, died in Nashville, Tennessee, on September 10, 2021, at age 73.
