= The Remingtons =

American country music group

- A promotional picture of the Remingtons, ca. 1991

Background information
- Origin: Nashville, Tennessee, United States
- Genres: Country
- Years active: 1991–1993
- Labels: BNA
- Spinoff of: Bread; Cymarron
- Past members: Jimmy Griffin; Richard Mainegra; Rick Yancey; Denny Henson

The Remingtons were an American country music group founded in 1991. The original members were Jimmy Griffin, Richard Mainegra, and Rick Yancey, all three of whom were vocalists and guitarists. Griffin was previously a member of the soft rock group Bread, while Mainegra and Yancey had previously been part of another soft rock group called Cymarron. Yancey left in 1992 and was replaced by Denny Henson. The group recorded two albums for BNA Records (then known as BNA Entertainment) and charted five country singles, including the number 10 "A Long Time Ago." The Remingtons broke up in 1993 and all four members continued in other projects.

== Biography ==
The Remingtons were founded in 1991 by singers Jimmy Griffin, Richard Mainegra, and Rick Yancey (December 31, 1947 – September 10, 2021). Griffin was a founding member of the soft rock group Bread, and both Mainegra and Yancey previously recorded in Cymarron, another soft rock band. Griffin also recorded in 1990 as one-third of Black Tie, which included country pop singer Billy Swan and former Eagles member Randy Meisner.

The Remingtons were one of the first acts signed to BNA Entertainment (later BNA Records), a country music record label founded in 1991. Their debut album, Blue Frontier, was released that year. It accounted for three straight Top 40 hits on the Billboard country charts, including the number 10 "A Long Time Ago". Yancey was replaced in 1992 by Denny Henson, a former member of Dan Fogelberg's backing band, shortly before the group released its second album, 1993's Aim for the Heart. The album still featured several songs written by Yancey, and he played acoustic guitar on the album's cover of Bread's "Everything I Own".

In 1993, The Remingtons was shortlisted for the Academy of Country Music Award for New Vocal Duo or Group of the Year.

Griffin and Yancey, along with Ronnie Guilbeau formed GYG (Griffin, Yancey, Guilbeau) in 2001. They recorded only one album and performed in and around the Nashville area until Griffin was diagnosed with cancer and died in 2005.

Yancey, singer and guitarist, died in Nashville, Tennessee, on September 10, 2021, at age 73.

== Discography ==
=== Albums ===
Title	Album details	Peak chart positions		
Title	Album details	US Country	US Heat	CAN Country
Blue Frontier	Release date: January 28, 1992; Label: BNA Records	55	23	18
Aim for the Heart	Release date: April 6, 1993; Label: BNA Records	—	—	—
"—" denotes releases that did not chart

=== Singles ===
Year	Single	Peak chart positions		Album
Year	Single	US Country	CAN Country	Album
1991	"A Long Time Ago"	10	18	Blue Frontier
1992	"I Could Love You (With My Eyes Closed)"	33	35	Blue Frontier
1992	"Two-Timin' Me"	18	34	Blue Frontier
1993	"Nobody Loves You When You're Free"	52	85	Aim for the Heart
1993	"Wall Around Her Heart"	69	91	Aim for the Heart

=== Music videos ===
Year	Video	Director
1991	"A Long Time Ago"	Gustavo Garzon
1992	"I Could Love You (With My Eyes Closed)"	Steve Boyle
1993	"Nobody Loves You When You're Free"	
1993	"Wall Around Her Heart"	
