= Lisa Angelle =

American country music singer-songwriter

- Born: December 27, 1965 (age 60)
- Origin: New Orleans, Louisiana, United States
- Genres: Country
- Occupation: singer-songwriter
- Years active: 1985–2001
- Labels: EMI America; DreamWorks Nashville

Lisa Angelle (born December 27, 1965, in New Orleans, Louisiana, United States) is an American country music singer-songwriter. During the 1980s and 1990s, Angelle wrote songs for several country artists including Wynonna Judd, who reached number one on the Billboard Hot Country Singles & Tracks chart in 1992 with "I Saw the Light", co-written by pop singer Andrew Gold. As a recording artist, Angelle released two singles with EMI America Records in 1985, but did not release an album until 2000 via DreamWorks Nashville. She also recorded the theme song for the CBS TV series Beauty and the Beast, which aired 1987 to 1990.

== Discography ==
=== Lisa Angelle (2000) ===
Lisa Angelle

Studio album by Lisa Angelle
- Released: October 31, 2000
- Genre: Country
- Length: 45:10
- Label: DreamWorks Nashville
- Producer: Lisa Angelle, Andrew Gold, Paul Worley

Professional ratings
Review scores
Source	Rating
Allmusic	link

==== Track listing ====
All songs written by Lisa Angelle and Andrew Gold except where noted.

1. "4, 3, 2, 1" – 3:23
2. "A Woman Gets Lonely" (Angelle) – 4:23
3. "Kiss This" – 5:01
4. "I Didn't Want to Know" – 4:18
5. "I Wear Your Love" – 3:13
6. "Sin" (Lewis Anderson, Angelle) – 4:07
7. "Twisted" – 3:12
8. "Daddy's Gun" – 4:40
9. "Midnight Rodeo" – 4:03
10. "I Don't Know Why" (Angelle) – 4:09
11. "Sparrow" (Angelle) – 5:21

==== Personnel ====
- Lisa Angelle – lead vocals, background vocals
- Robert Bailey Jr. – background vocals
- Steve Conn – accordion
- J.T. Corenflos – electric guitar
- Dan Dugmore – steel guitar
- Stuart Duncan – fiddle
- Andrew Gold – acoustic guitar, electric guitar, keyboards, background vocals
- Vicki Hampton – background vocals
- Wes Hightower – background vocals
- John Hobbs – keyboards
- David Huff – drum programming
- Troy Johnson – background vocals
- B. James Lowry – acoustic guitar
- George Marinelli – electric guitar
- Paul Mills – bells, viola
- Steve Nathan – keyboards
- Tom Roady – percussion
- Biff Watson – acoustic guitar
- Chris Willis – background vocals
- Lonnie Wilson – drums
- Glenn Worf – bass guitar
- Paul Worley – acoustic guitar, electric guitar

=== Singles ===
Year	Single	Peak positions		Album
Year	Single	US Country	US Country Sales	Album
1985	"Love, It's the Pits"	78	—	—N/a
1985	"Bring Back Love"	96	—	—N/a
1987	"The First Time I Loved Forever"	—	—	Beauty and the Beast (soundtrack)
1999	"I Wear Your Love"	—	19	Lisa Angelle
1999	"Kiss This"	75	—	Lisa Angelle
2000	"A Woman Gets Lonely"	62	—	Lisa Angelle
2001	"I Will Love You"	50	—	—N/a
"—" denotes releases that did not chart

=== Music videos ===
Year	Video	Director
1999	"I Wear Your Love"	Steven Goldmann
2000	"A Woman Gets Lonely"	Eric Welch
