= Ropin' the Wind =

Studio album by Garth Brooks
- Released: September 2, 1991
- Recorded: 1990–1991
- Studios: Jack's Tracks (Nashville, Tennessee)
- Genre: Country
- Length: 39:21
- Label: Capitol Nashville
- Producer: Allen Reynolds

Garth Brooks chronology
No Fences (1990)	Ropin' the Wind (1991)	Beyond the Season (1992)

Singles from Ropin' the Wind
- 1. "Rodeo" Released: August 12, 1991; 2. "Shameless" Released: October 21, 1991; 3. "What She's Doing Now" Released: December 6, 1991; 4. "Papa Loved Mama" Released: February 3, 1992; 5. "The River" Released: April 27, 1992

Professional ratings
Review scores
Source	Rating
AllMusic	5/5 stars
Christgau's Consumer Guide	A−
Entertainment Weekly	C+
Los Angeles Times	2.5/5 stars
The Rolling Stone Album Guide	4/5 stars

Ropin' the Wind is the third studio album by country music artist Garth Brooks. It was released on September 2, 1991, and became his first studio album to debut at No. 1 on both the Billboard 200 chart and the Top Country Albums chart. This marked the first time a country singer topped both charts since Kenny Rogers accomplished this just over a decade earlier. The album had four runs at No. 1 between September 28, 1991, and April 3, 1992, spending a total of 18 weeks at the top and ultimately being certified 14× Platinum by the RIAA in 1998. In the UK, it reached the Top 50 pop albums list and maintained the No. 1 position for several months on the country charts. It is the last studio album released under Capitol Records Nashville until the 1995 album Fresh Horses.

The track "Shameless" is a cover version of a song by Billy Joel, recorded on his 1989 album Storm Front.

According to AllMusic, Ropin' the Wind was the first country album to debut at No. 1 on the Billboard 200.

== Background ==
Brooks commented on the album, saying:

"Ropin' the Wind was what we called the son of Fences. Ropin' the Wind was made during this kind of tour that we were on from No Fences. We were gone for pretty much 250 days out of the year. In the remaining 100 days, I elected to cut Ropin' the Wind and try to write for it. This album became a lot bigger than I ever thought it could possibly be. When I listen to the singles off of it like 'Rodeo,' 'What She's Doing Now,' 'The River,' 'Papa Loved Mama,' and 'Shameless,' I look at it and stand very proud. And when I also look at the cuts, 'Against the Grain' and 'Cold Shoulder,' these songs I am equally proud of."

== Reception ==
Ropin' the Wind debuted at No. 1 on the U.S. Billboard 200, becoming his first album to achieve this milestone, and reached No. 1 on the Top Country Albums chart, selling 400,000 copies. This made it his second No. 1 country album. In September 1998, Ropin' the Wind was certified 14× Platinum by the RIAA.

== Track listing ==
Ropin' the Wind
No.	Title	Writer(s)	Length
1.	"Against the Grain"	Bruce Bouton; Larry Cordle; Carl Jackson	2:23
2.	"Rodeo"	Larry Bastian	3:54
3.	"What She's Doing Now"	Pat Alger; Garth Brooks	3:26
4.	"Burning Bridges"	Brooks; Stephanie C. Brown	3:36
5.	"Which One of Them (Note: Limited Edition version only)"	Brooks	2:40
6.	"Papa Loved Mama"	Brooks; Kim Williams	2:50
7.	"Shameless"	Billy Joel	4:20
8.	"Cold Shoulder"	Kent Blazy; Brooks; Williams	3:54
9.	"We Bury the Hatchet"	Brooks; Royal Wade Kimes	3:05
10.	"In Lonesome Dove"	Brooks; Cynthia Limbaugh	4:49
11.	"The River"	Victoria Shaw; Brooks	4:25
Total length:			39:22

European Bonus Tracks
No.	Title	Writer(s)	Length
12.	"Alabama Clay"	Larry Cordle; Ronny Scaife	3:39
13.	"Everytime That It Rains"	Brooks; Ty England; Charlie Stefl	4:12
14.	"Nobody Gets Off In This Town"	Larry Bastian; Dewayne Blackwell	2:19
15.	"Cowboy Bill"	Bastian; Ed Berghoff	4:33
Total length:			55:47

== Personnel ==
- Garth Brooks – lead and backing vocals, acoustic guitar
- Susan Ashton – backing vocals
- Bruce Bouton – lap and pedal steel guitars, Dobro
- Sam Bush – mandolin
- Mark Casstevens – acoustic guitar
- Mike Chapman – bass guitar
- Charles Cochran – string arrangements
- Larry Cordle – backing vocals
- Jerry Douglas – Dobro
- Carl Jackson – backing vocals
- Chris Leuzinger – electric guitar
- Rob Hajacos – fiddle
- Kenny Malone – percussion
- Edgar Meyer – acoustic bass
- Milton Sledge – drums, percussion
- Bobby Wood – keyboards
- Trisha Yearwood – backing vocals
- Nashville String Machine – string orchestra

== Charts ==
=== Weekly charts ===
Chart (1991)	Peak position
Australian Albums (ARIA)	21
Canadian Albums (RPM)	22
Canadian Country Albums (RPM)	1
Dutch Albums (Album Top 100)	69
European Albums (Billboard)	91
Irish Albums (Billboard)	10
New Zealand Albums (RMNZ)	33
Norwegian Albums (VG-lista)	14
Spanish Albums (AFYVE)	31
UK Albums (Official Charts)	41
US Billboard 200	1
US Top Country Albums (Billboard)	1
Zimbabwean Albums Chart	1

=== Singles ===
Year	Single	Peak chart positions			
Year	Single	US Country	CAN Country	CAN AC	UK
1991	"Rodeo"	3	1	—	—
1991	"Shameless"	1	1	26	71
1991	"What She's Doing Now"	1	1	—	—
1992	"Papa Loved Mama"	3	2	—	—
1992	"The River"	1	1	—	—

=== Other charted songs ===
Year	Single	Peak positions
Year	Single	US Country
1992	"Against the Grain"	66

=== Year-end charts ===
Chart (1991)	Position
Canada Top Albums/CDs (RPM)	98
US Billboard 200	79
US Top Country Albums (Billboard)	47

Chart (1992)	Position
US Billboard 200	1
US Top Country Albums (Billboard)	1

Chart (1993)	Position
US Billboard 200	68
US Top Country Albums (Billboard)	13

Chart (1994)	Position
US Top Country Albums (Billboard)	44

=== Decade-end charts ===
Chart (1990–1999)	Position
US Billboard 200	12

== Certifications and sales ==
Region	Certification	Certified units/sales
Australia (ARIA)	Platinum	70,000^{^}
Canada (Music Canada)	5× Platinum	500,000^{^}
Japan	—	23,000
Spain	—	40,000
United States (RIAA)	14× Platinum	14,000,000^{^}
^{^} Shipments figures based on certification alone.

== See also ==
- List of best-selling albums in the United States
