= Dan Dugmore =

American pedal steel guitarist (born 1949)

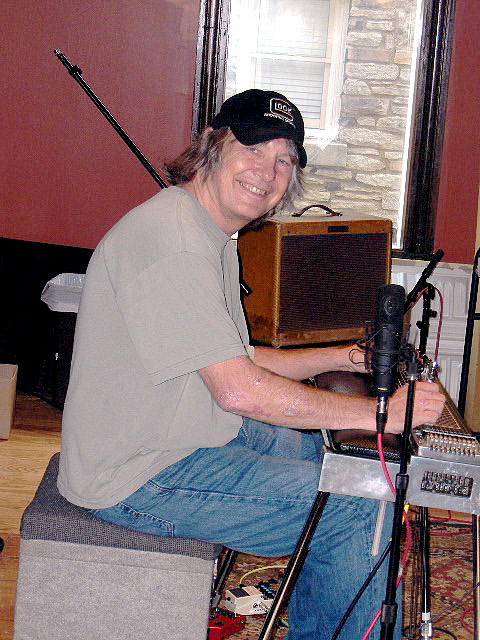
- Dugmore in 2005

Background information
- Born: April 5, 1949 (age 77)
- Origin: Pasadena, California, U.S.
- Genres: Country; country rock
- Occupation: Session musician
- Instruments: Pedal steel guitar; guitar; Dobro; banjo; mandolin.
- Years active: 1970s–present

Dan Dugmore (born April 5, 1949) is an American session musician and multi-instrumentalist best known for his pedal steel guitar work.

Born in 1949, Dugmore was raised in Pasadena, California. Influenced by the Flying Burrito Brothers, he learned to play steel guitar after the group's steel guitarist Sneaky Pete Kleinow sold him one. Dugmore then joined John Stewart's road band, and then Linda Ronstadt's; he also played for several James Taylor albums. In the 1990s, he moved to Nashville, Tennessee, where he began playing steel guitar on country music albums. He self-released a Beatles cover album in 2003 titled Off White Album.

Dugmore also plays Dobro, electric guitar, acoustic guitar, banjo and mandolin.

He has played as session musician with Keith Urban, David Crosby, David Gates, Don Henley, Dusty Springfield, Graham Nash, Jake Owen, James Taylor, Karla Bonoff, Kenny Loggins, Kenny Rogers, Kid Rock, Lauren Alaina, Linda Ronstadt, Lionel Richie, Mindy Smith, Olivia Newton-John, Randy Travis, Ronnie Milsap, Sheryl Crow, Stevie Nicks, Sturgill Simpson, Tim McGraw, Warren Zevon, The Mountain Goats, John Prine, Wilson Phillips, Sara Evans, Lisa Angelle, Martina McBride, Billy Dean, Matraca Berg, Toby Keith, Jean-Louis Murat, Chris LeDoux, Alabama, and ZZ Top, among others.
