= I Saw the Light (Wynonna Judd song) =

Single by Wynonna Judd

from the album Wynonna
- B-side: "When I Reach the Place I'm Goin'"
- Released: May 4, 1992
- Genre: Country
- Length: 3:55
- Label: MCA; Curb
- Songwriters: Andrew Gold; Lisa Angelle
- Producer: Tony Brown

Wynonna Judd singles chronology
"She Is His Only Need" (1992)	"I Saw the Light" (1992)	"No One Else on Earth" (1992)

"I Saw the Light" is a song by American country music artist Wynonna Judd, released on May 4, 1992, as the second official single from her self-titled debut studio album (1992). It was written by Andrew Gold and Lisa Angelle, and produced by Tony Brown. A video was produced for release alongside the single but was shelved.

The track was a commercial success, becoming her second consecutive number one single on the US Billboard Hot Country Songs chart and became the most played song of 1992 at country radio. As of 2024, it is the most recent song by a solo female artist to top the year-end chart.

== Critical reception ==
Kevin John Coyne of Country Universe gave the track an A rating, saying that "it has the rhythm and cadence of a classic sixties girl group hit, infused with just enough twang to keep the proceedings country." Lisa Smith and Cyndi Hoelzle of Gavin Report gave it a positive review by saying, "It's not the same light Hank was singing about, that's for sure. Why ask Wy? This song has so much energy, it's easy to see why so many stations jumped on it early. There's no stopping this Judd." Billboard also gave it a positive review, saying the track "sports a thoroughly infectious melody, vivid lyrical images, and rousing harmonies that add weight to the clever wordplay of the title."

== Track listings ==
Japanese mini-CD single

1. "I Saw the Light" – 3:55
2. "She Is His Only Need" – 4:27

Austrian CD single

1. "I Saw the Light" – 3:53
2. "When I Reach the Place I'm Goin'" – 4:29
3. "My Strongest Weakness" – 4:21

US jukebox single

1. "I Saw the Light" – 3:53
2. "When I Reach the Place I'm Goin'" – 2:49

== Personnel ==
The following musicians performed on this track.

- Eddie Bayers – drums
- Andrew Gold – background vocals
- Wynonna Judd – lead vocals
- Steve Nathan – keyboards
- Don Potter – acoustic guitar
- Matt Rollings – keyboards
- Steuart Smith – electric guitar
- Willie Weeks – bass guitar

== Charts ==
=== Weekly charts ===
Weekly chart performance for "I Saw the Light"
Chart (1992)	Peak position
Canada Country Singles (RPM)	1
Germany (GfK)	74
US Hot Country Songs (Billboard)	1
US Country Top 50 (Radio & Records)	1
US Gavin Country (Gavin Report)	1
US Top 100 Country Singles (Cashbox)	1

=== Year-end charts ===
Chart (1992)	Position
Canada Country Tracks (RPM)	8
US Country Songs (Billboard)	1
US Country (Radio & Records)	26
US Gavin Country (Gavin Report)	38
US Top 50 Country Singles (Cashbox)	25

== Covers ==
On October 20, 2013, Irish singer Lisa Stanley released a cover, re-titling it as "I Saw the Light in Your Window Tonight". A video was directed by producer Seamus O'Donnell. It peaked at number 11 on the iTunes country charts.
