= My Strongest Weakness =

- Cassette single cover art

Single by Wynonna Judd

from the album Wynonna
- B-side: "What It Takes"
- Released: December 5, 1992
- Genre: Country Ballad
- Length: 4:22
- Label: MCA; Curb
- Songwriters: Naomi Judd; Mike Reid
- Producer: Tony Brown

Wynonna Judd singles chronology
"No One Else on Earth" (1992)	"My Strongest Weakness" (1992)	"Tell Me Why" (1993)

"My Strongest Weakness" is a song written by Naomi Judd and Mike Reid, and recorded by American country music artist Wynonna Judd. It was released in December 1992 as the fourth and final single from Wynonna's self-titled debut album. The song peaked at number 4 on the Billboard Hot Country Singles & Tracks (now Hot Country Songs) charts.

== Personnel ==
The following musicians performed on this track:

- Eddie Bayers – drums
- Wynonna Judd – lead vocals
- Steve Nathan – keyboards
- Don Potter – acoustic guitar
- Matt Rollings – keyboards
- Steuart Smith – electric guitar
- Willie Weeks – bass guitar

== Chart performance ==
Chart (1992–1993)	Peak position
Canada Country Singles (RPM)	4
US Bubbling Under Hot 100 (Billboard)	19
US Hot Country Songs (Billboard)	4

=== Year-end charts ===
Chart (1993)	Position
Canada Country Tracks (RPM)	72
US Country Songs (Billboard)	68
