= Jimmy Griffin =

American musician (1943–2005)

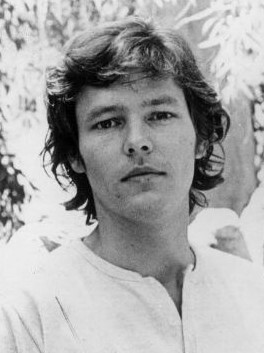
- Griffin in 1971

Background information
- Born: James Arthur Griffin; August 10, 1943; Cincinnati, Ohio, U.S.
- Origin: Memphis, Tennessee, U.S.
- Died: January 11, 2005 (aged 61) Franklin, Tennessee, U.S.
- Genres: Soft rock
- Occupations: Singer; guitarist; songwriter
- Instruments: Vocals; guitar
- Years active: 1963–2005
- Formerly of: Bread; Black Tie; The Remingtons; Toast

James Arthur Griffin (August 10, 1943 – January 11, 2005) was an American singer, guitarist and songwriter, best known for his work with the 1970s soft rock band Bread. He won an Academy Award for Best Original Song in 1970 as co-writer of "For All We Know".

== Early life ==
Griffin was born in Cincinnati, Ohio and grew up in Memphis, Tennessee. His musical training began when his parents signed him up for accordion lessons. He attended Kingsbury High School in Memphis and Dorsey and Johnny Burnette were his neighbors and role models. After the Burnette brothers moved to Los Angeles, California to further their music careers, Griffin went there to visit them, and managed to secure a recording contract with Reprise Records.

== Career ==
=== Solo performing and songwriting ===
His first album, Summer Holiday, was released in 1963. He had small roles in two films, For Those Who Think Young (1964) and None but the Brave (1965).

In the 1960s, Griffin teamed with fellow songwriter Michael Z. Gordon to write songs for such diverse singers as Ed Ames, Gary Lewis, Bobby Vee, Brian Hyland, The Standells, Lesley Gore, Sandy Nelson and Cher. The pair won a BMI award for "Apologize" sung by Ames in 1968.

Griffin met Robb Royer through Maria Yolanda Aguayo (Griffin's future wife). The two hit it off immediately and became life-time collaborators both as performers and writers. Griffin was a staff writer with Viva Publishing and managed to get them to hire Royer as his co-writer in 1967. Viva was resistant to hiring Royer and instead wanted Griffin to write with another staff writer with the company. According to Royer, Griffin convinced Viva to hire Royer by threatening "I will be writing with him. Do you really want to give away half the publishing on all those songs?". James Griffin sang songs that were featured in a few episodes of the TV series Ironside in the late sixties.

=== Bread ===
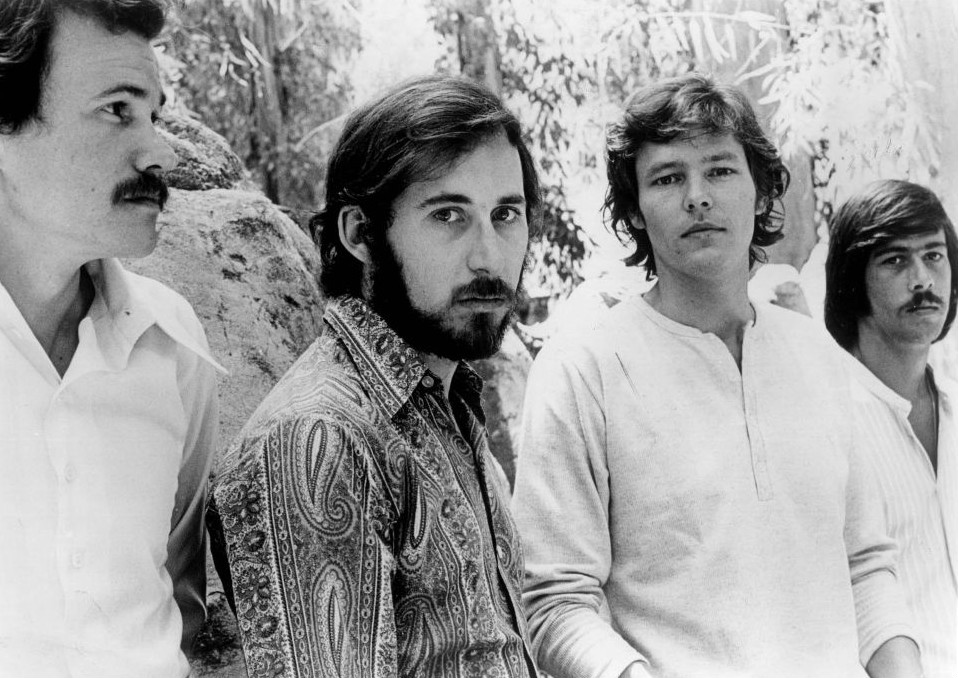
Griffin (second from right) as part of the band Bread in 1971

In 1968, Griffin and Royer teamed with David Gates to form the band Bread using session drummer Jim Gordon for their first album and their initial gigs. Mike Botts soon replaced Gordon as the band's permanent drummer, first appearing on their second album, On the Waters.

In 1970, Griffin and Royer – under the pseudonyms Arthur James and Robb Wilson – wrote the lyrics for Fred Karlin's music for the song "For All We Know", featured in the film Lovers and Other Strangers. It won the Academy Award for Best Song.This song was later covered by The Carpenters on their third album.

In 1971 Royer left Bread, but continued to provide songs co-written with Griffin for the group. He was replaced by keyboardist/guitarist Larry Knechtel. They had a number one Billboard Hot 100 hit with the song, "Make It With You". Other hits by Bread included "Baby I'm-a Want You", "If" and "Everything I Own". Although Griffin was a significant contributor to Bread's albums as a writer and singer, every one of the group's thirteen songs that made the Billboard Hot 100 chart was written and sung by Gates, a situation that created friction between the two.

After the release of Guitar Man in 1972, Bread went on hiatus. Griffin released a solo album, Breakin' Up Is Easy on Polydor Records in 1973, credited to 'James Griffin & Co'. Neither the album nor the singles, "Breakin' Up Is Easy", and "She Knows", made the Billboard charts. Bread reformed in 1976 for one final album, Lost Without Your Love. Gates, Botts, and Knechtel continued to record together on Gates's solo albums, and initially toured as 'David Gates & Bread', which led to a lawsuit from Griffin. The dispute was not resolved until 1984. Griffin and Gates put aside their past differences for a Bread reunion tour in 1996–1997 with Botts and Knechtel.

=== Black Tie ===
In 1977, Griffin released a third solo album, James Griffin, also on Polydor, with tracks recorded in 1974 and 1975. He teamed with Terry Sylvester (formerly of The Hollies) on the album Griffin & Sylvester in 1982 and was a member of Black Tie with Randy Meisner and Billy Swan, which released When The Night Falls in 1985, co-produced by T-Bone Burnett. Robb Royer was also credited as a musician on the album. The album was remixed and reissued in the early 1990s, with Griffin's voice more prominent on some songs. The Black Tie single "Learning The Game" peaked at No. 59 on the Billboard country chart in 1991.

=== The Remingtons ===
In 1991 Griffin formed The Remingtons with Richard Mainegra and Rick Yancey. They released their first single that same year, followed by the albums Blue Frontier (1992) and Aim for the Heart (1993). Their single, "A Long Time Ago" went Top 10 on Billboard''s country chart in 1992 with "Two-Timin' Me" cracking the Top 20 later that year.

=== Toast/Radio Dixie ===
Beginning in 1994 Griffin and Robb Royer collaborated with Grammy-nominated songwriter and multi-instrumentalist Todd Cerney to write songs and perform in local venues. Larry Knechtel also participated in the collaboration and the group called themselves Toast (an obvious reference to Bread). Griffin, Royer and Cerney began this collaboration when they wrote "Kyrie" in 1994. Knechtel also joined songwriting credits on the 1995 song "Slow Train". The group wrote, recorded and performed together at various Nashville Venues including the Bluebird Cafe, 3rd & Lindsley, and 12th & Porter. In 1998 they changed the name to "Radio Dixie" in an effort to be more commercially viable. The group disbanded in 1998, although Royer and Cerney continued to collaborate on song-writing.

== Death ==
Griffin died of complications from cancer on January 11, 2005, at his home in Franklin, Tennessee, after undergoing treatment for several months; he was 61 years old. He was survived by his wife Marti, daughters Katy and Alexis, sons Jamey and Jacob, granddaughters Laura and Lilli and grandsons Gryffyn and Max.
