= I Can Help =

Single by Billy Swan

from the album I Can Help
- B-side: "Ways of a Woman in Love"
- Released: July 1974
- Recorded: 1974
- Studio: Young 'Un Sound, Murfreesboro, Tennessee
- Genre: Rockabilly; country
- Length: 2:58 (single edit); 4:01 (album version)
- Label: Monument
- Songwriter: Billy Swan
- Producers: Chip Young and Billy Swan

Billy Swan singles chronology
"I Can Help" (1974)	"I'm Her Fool" (1975)

"I Can Help" is a song written and performed by Billy Swan. Released in July 1974, it became a big crossover smash some four months later, reaching No. 1 on both the Billboard Hot 100 and Hot Country Singles charts in November. Although Swan had other charting singles on both the Hot 100 and country charts, the song is generally recognized as his only major hit single release. However, Swan had continued success as a songwriter for other artists and as a session musician.

== Production ==
Billy Swan secured his own recording deal with Monument Records, after his return to Nashville in August 1973. From the time he secured the deal, Swan began the composition of "I Can Help" in a music room which his wife, Marlu, had converted from a closet inside the small duplex that they shared close to Centennial Park. Swan has revealed that he used a "Rock" preset, from his Rhythm Master drum machine, when writing the song; "It played 16ths and sounded like a sock cymbal, so I just started playing these chords along with it, and the song came in about 20 minutes. I didn't always write that quickly, but from my experience the ones that come quickly are the good ones. "Lover Please" was like that, and so was "Everything's the Same". With "I Can Help" I actually wrote the three verses first, and since I needed something to put between the second and third verse I then came up with the bridge. The whole thing just came out of the air, including the words."

"I Can Help" was written during March 1974, and also during that time Swan recorded it with producer and engineer Chip Young at the Young 'Un Sound studio in Murfreesboro. The distinctive keyboards were played by Swan on a portable Farfisa organ belonging to Memphis session musician Bobby Emmons while Young's German Shepherd puppy, Bowser, tugged on his pants leg. The vocals were recorded with a Neumann U 47, while Swan's Farfisa, Mike Leech's bass and Reggie Young's guitar, were all recorded direct. Dennis Linde and Johnny Christopher, who played acoustic guitars, were each miked with Sony ECM lapel mics, while the setup for Hayward Bishop's drums comprised another pair of ECMs overhead on the cymbals, an Electrovoice RE15 on the toms, an RE20 on the kick and a Shure SM58 on the snare. Keyboardist Bobby Wood was also booked for the session, but after hearing the track and realising he wasn't needed he joined Emmons and Young in the control room. Emmons and Young suggested overdubbing handclaps at the end to convey an in-studio party atmosphere, as well as adding some bridge-section backing vocals by Lea Jane Berinati and the Holladay Sisters (Ginger and Mary). Chip Young added a guitar solo, and Swan recalls that "Chip was excited after he recorded that part, but I went out there and listened to it, and I said, 'Boy, I don't know.' I listened to it over and over, until finally I said, 'Hey, man, nothing else will work.' It was actually a great solo, so that just shows you where my head is at. That part was so perfect, and today a lot of people remember the song because of that solo."

The album version contains a false ending with the clapping followed by a reasonably extended cadenza on the organ, which then is followed by an instrumental repeat of the ending, followed by another brief organ cadenza, which afterwards is then followed by another instrumental repeat of the ending before the song's fade.

=== Personnel ===
Credits from Richard Buskin, Billy Swan, and Chip Young. According to Buskin, Swan, and Young, keyboardists Bobby Wood and Bobby Emmons were hired to record the song but decided they were surplus and observed from the booth.

- Billy Swan – lead vocals, Farfisa organ, producer
- Dennis Linde – acoustic rhythm guitar
- Johnny Christopher – acoustic rhythm guitar
- Reggie Young – electric lead guitar
- Chip Young – electric lead guitars (guitar solos), producer, engineer
- Mike Leech – bass
- Hayward Bishop – drums
- Lea Jane Berinati, Ginger Holladay, Mary Holladay – backing vocals
- uncredited – handclaps

== Release ==
Swan's version of "I Can Help" was released toward the end of July 1974 and rose to the top of the Billboard Hot 100 pop chart in November of that year. To make more money from the song's commercial success, the co-producers returned to Young'un Sound to record more material for an I Can Help album. This included covers of "Don't Be Cruel", "Shake, Rattle and Roll" and Swan's own "Lover Please".

However, the success of the song led the record company to argue about which would be the first single on the album. "Everyone at the record company had actually wanted 'The Ways of a Woman in Love' to be the first single," Young recalls. "I said, 'No, wait a minute. That's not the hit. The hit is "I Can Help".' However, [Monument Records president] Fred Foster then hired a guy who was supposed to know the ins and outs of the business, and he said, 'There aren't any hits here. We've gotta re-cut a bunch of stuff.' I said, 'No, we don't have to re-cut a bunch of stuff.' It was a battle from then on."

== Chart performance ==
In addition to being a No. 1 country and pop hit, "I Can Help" reached No. 6 on Billboard's Hot Adult Contemporary Singles chart and No. 6 on the United Kingdom's Record Retailer chart. In addition, the song was a hit throughout most of Europe and also reached No. 1 in Australia. "I Can Help" was so successful in Norway that it charted for 37 weeks on the Norwegian charts (VG-lista Top 10), making it the 4th best-performing single of all time in that country.

"I Can Help" is certified gold for sales of 1,000,000 units by the Recording Industry Association of America. In UK, it has "Silver" certification, and in France, it has sales about 700,000.

At the Amusement & Music Operators Association (AMOA) Jukebox Awards in 1975, the song was awarded "Jukebox Pop Record of the Year" for being the year's highest-earning pop music song played on jukebox machines in the United States.

== Charts ==
=== Weekly charts ===
Chart (1974–1975)	Peak position
Australia (Kent Music Report)	1
Austrian Top 40	1
Belgian VRT Top 30	1
Canada Top Singles (RPM)	2
Canada Adult Contemporary (RPM)	4
Canadian Country Tracks (RPM)	1
Danish Singles Chart	1
Euro Hit 50	1
Irish Singles Chart	11
Italian Singles Chart	42
Netherlands (Dutch Top 40)	1
New Zealand Singles Chart	1
Norwegian Singles Chart	1
South Africa (Springbok)	3
Spanish Singles Chart	4
Swedish Singles Chart	1
Swiss Singles Chart	1
UK Singles Chart	6
US Billboard Hot 100	1
US Adult Contemporary (Billboard)	6
US Hot Country Songs (Billboard)	1
West German Singles Chart	1

=== Year-end charts ===
Chart (1974)	Rank
Canada Top Singles (RPM)	16

Chart (1975)	Rank
Australia (Kent Music Report)	20
Austrian Top 40	6
Belgian VRT Top 30	4
Netherlands	16
Swiss Music Charts	5
US Billboard Hot 100	43
West Germany (Media Control)	5

== Cover versions ==
Many other artists have performed covers of the song, among them:

- 1975: Elvis Presley on the album Today.
- 1975: Loretta Lynn on the album Back to the Country.
- 1985: Tom Jones on the album Tender Loving Care.
- 1994: Shakin' Stevens on The Singles Collection, released in Germany.
- 1995: Aaron Tippin on the album Tool Box
- 2021: Charley Crockett on the Compilation album The Next Waltz, Vol. 3
- 2023: Lindsay Lou on the album Queen of Time.

== See also ==
- List of 1970s one-hit wonders in the United States
