= Papa Loved Mama =

Single by Garth Brooks

from the album Ropin' the Wind
- B-side: "New Way to Fly"
- Released: February 3, 1992
- Recorded: 1991
- Studio: Jack's Tracks (Nashville, Tennessee)
- Genre: Country
- Length: 2:51
- Label: Liberty 57734
- Songwriters: Kim Williams; Garth Brooks
- Producer: Allen Reynolds

Garth Brooks singles chronology
"What She's Doing Now" (1991)	"Papa Loved Mama" (1992)	"The River" (1992)

"Papa Loved Mama" is a song co-written and recorded by American country music artist Garth Brooks. It was released in February 1992 as the fourth single from his album Ropin' the Wind and also appears on The Hits, The Limited Series, Double Live, and The Ultimate Hits. It reached number 3 on the Billboard Country Charts. The song was written by Brooks and Kim Williams.

== Content ==
A trucker's son reflects on a tragic incident he experienced as a child. His father worked as a truck driver and his time away drove his mother to commit adultery. Though his father would call constantly, the mother needed physical intimacy, and began seeing other men. One night, the father came home unexpectedly with roses and wine. He went upstairs for the mother, who is having a one-night stand at the local motel. The father drove his truck directly into the local motel room. The incident was covered in the paper the next day. The mother was killed and the father went to prison.

== Background and production ==
Brooks provided the following background information on the song in the CD booklet liner notes from The Hits:

"This song is just total fun at a chaotic pace. Kim Williams and I were writing this song in the studio. We had just finished the Ropin' the Wind album, with the tenth cut being 'Walking After Midnight.' We had one session left over with no songs whatsoever. I asked Allen if I could do something screwy by playing this 'Papa Loved Mama' song. Kim Williams came in and we wrote the bridge right before we cut it. After we cut it, we knew that it had to make the album. 'Walking After Midnight' then moved to The Chase, and 'Papa Loved Mama' was placed on Ropin' the Wind. Kim Williams might be one of the most talented writers I have ever worked with simply because he can sneak so many things in on you as a listener and he does it with this big smile on his face. Be it as a co-writer or just a friend, I hope I see that smile the rest of my life... good guy."

== Charts ==
Chart (1992)	Peak position
Canada Country Singles (RPM)	2
US Hot Country Songs (Billboard)	3

=== Year-end charts ===
Chart (1992)	Position
Canada Country Tracks (RPM)	15
US Country Songs (Billboard)	57
