= No One Else on Earth =

Single by Wynonna Judd

from the album Wynonna
- Released: August 25, 1992
- Genre: Country, country rock
- Length: 4:01
- Label: MCA; Curb
- Songwriters: Jill Colucci; Stewart Harris; Sam Lorber
- Producer: Tony Brown

Wynonna Judd singles chronology
"I Saw the Light" (1992)	"No One Else on Earth" (1992)	"My Strongest Weakness" (1992)

"No One Else on Earth" is a song by American country music artist Wynonna Judd, released as the third single from her eponymous solo debut album on August 25, 1992. The track was written by Jill Colucci, Stewart Harris, and Sam Lorber and was produced by Tony Brown. It featured lead guitar from session guitarist Steuart Smith.

The song became a huge success for Wynonna, topping the US Hot Country Songs chart for four weeks, becoming the longest running number one single by a female artist since Dolly Parton's "Here You Come Again" spent five weeks atop in 1977. It was also the album's third number one single following "She Is His Only Need" and "I Saw the Light". The song was later remixed and released in the UK in 1994, re-titled "No One Else on Earth '94"; the official music video for the song uses this remix. Because of its success, the song has been regarded as Wynonna's signature song.

== Personnel ==
Taken from the Wynonna booklet.

- Eddie Bayers – drums
- John Cowan – background vocals
- Wynonna Judd – lead vocals
- Jonell Mosser – background vocals
- Steve Nathan – keyboards
- Don Potter – electric guitar
- Matt Rollings – keyboards
- Steuart Smith – electric guitar
- Willie Weeks – bass guitar

== Critical reception ==
Lisa Smith and Cyndi Hoelzle of Gavin Report wrote that "This song is unstoppable, with an irresistably funky groove."

== Charts ==
"No One Else on Earth" topped the US Hot Country Songs for four consecutive weeks, becoming one of only four songs of 1992 to spend at least four or more weeks atop, the others being "Boot Scootin' Boogie" from Brooks & Dunn, "What She's Doing Now" from Garth Brooks, and "Achy Breaky Heart" from Billy Ray Cyrus. The track also became a minor adult contemporary hit.

Chart (1992)	Peak position
Canada Country Singles (RPM)	1
US Billboard Hot 100	83
US Adult Contemporary (Billboard)	35
US Hot Country Songs (Billboard)	1

=== Year-end charts ===
Chart (1992)	Position
Canada Country Tracks (RPM)	21
US Country Songs (Billboard)	36

== Certifications ==
Region	Certification	Certified units/sales
United States (RIAA)	Gold	500,000^{‡}
^{‡} Sales+streaming figures based on certification alone.
