= A Long Time Ago (song) =

Single by The Remingtons

from the album Blue Frontier
- B-side: "Takin' the Easy Way Out"
- Released: October 12, 1991
- Genre: Country
- Length: 2:23
- Label: BNA
- Songwriter: Richard Mainegra
- Producers: Larry Michael Lee; Josh Leo

The Remingtons singles chronology
| "A Long Time Ago" (1991) | "I Could Love You (With My Eyes Closed)" (1992) |

"A Long Time Ago" is a song written by Richard Mainegra, and recorded by American country music group The Remingtons. It was released in October 1991 as their debut single and the first from their album Blue Frontier. The song reached number 10 on the Billboard Hot Country Singles & Tracks chart in January 1992.

== Music video ==
The music video was directed by Gustavo Garzon and premiered in late 1991.

== Chart performance ==
| Chart (1991–1992) | Peak position |
|---|---|
| Canada Country Singles (RPM) | 18 |
| US Hot Country Songs (Billboard) | 10 |
