= Billy Swan =

American musician and songwriter

- Born: William Lance Swan; May 12, 1942 (age 84); Cape Girardeau, Missouri, U.S.
- Occupations: Singer-songwriter; producer
- Years active: 1962–present
- Spouse: Marlu Swan (m. 1973; died 2003)
- Children: Planet Swan; Sierra Swan
- Musical career
- Origin: Nashville, Tennessee, U.S.
- Genres: country; rock and roll
- Instruments: Vocals; guitar; keyboards; drums
- Labels: Monument; A&M; Epic
- Formerly of: Black Tie

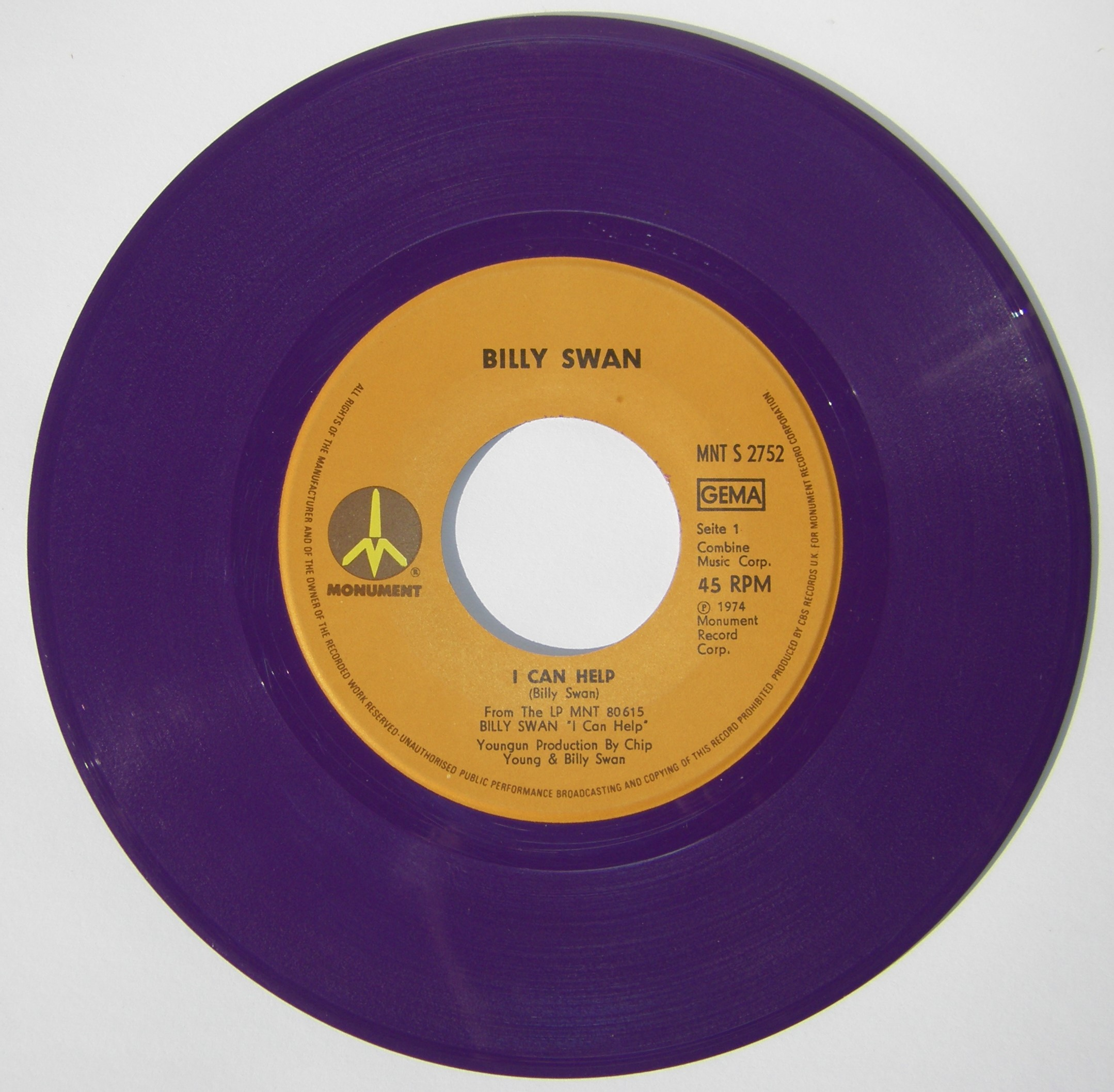
Purple vinyl of Billy Swan single "I Can Help", 1974

William Lance Swan (born May 12, 1942) is an American country singer-songwriter, best known for his 1974 single "I Can Help".

== Background ==
Swan was born in Cape Girardeau, Missouri southeast of St. Louis on the Mississippi River. As a child, he learned drums, piano and guitar, and began writing songs. His first big break was in 1962 when Clyde McPhatter recorded "Lover Please", a song Swan wrote when he was in a local band, Mirt Mirly & the Rhythm Steppers, who had first recorded the song on Bill Black's Louis label. McPhatter's version quickly became a No. 7 pop hit.

Swan moved to Memphis, Tennessee, to work with Black, but that was cut short with Black's illness and later death in 1965. It was rumored that Swan worked as a security guard at Graceland. While he was friends with one of the security guards he never worked at Graceland. He then moved to Nashville which enabled him to write hit country songs for numerous artists including Conway Twitty, Waylon Jennings, and Mel Tillis. In 1969, Swan first took on the role of record producer producing Tony Joe White's Top Ten hit "Polk Salad Annie". Swan also played bass guitar for Kris Kristofferson and then signed a solo recording deal with Monument Records.

"Here's this guy who really doesn't sing very well at all and not only has he now made more good albums than Three Dog Night and the Mormon Tabernacle Choir combined, but they keep getting better. Except maybe for 'Blue Suede Shoes' there are no waste cuts this time, and no mediocrities either. The well-meaning optimism and the insecure persona mesh perfectly, and the tunes are pleasurable throughout, whether he stole them from the Sun catalogue or wrote them himself."

— Review of Billy Swan in Christgau's Record Guide: Rock Albums of the Seventies (1981)

Swan moved to Nashville in 1973 and cut his first album, I Can Help in early 1974, which included the track "Lover Please". The album budget was only $19,000 and a music business professional who was hired by the president of Monument Records, Fred Foster, declared pre-release that there were no hits on the record. However, the single "I Can Help" proved this wrong; it was recorded at Young 'Un Sound in Murfreesboro, Tennessee southeast of Nashville. It was a rockabilly number which topped the Billboard Hot 100 as well as the US and Canadian country charts in 1974, also becoming a hit in many other countries.

Swan wrote the song using an RMI organ which Kristofferson and singer Rita Coolidge had bought for him as a wedding gift. However, the RMI organ wasn't used on the final recording, contrary to popular belief, it was actually a portable Farfisa from Bobby Emmons, a Memphis session musician. Swan recalls, "Chip set up a vocal mic, I stood in front of the organ, and what you hear was captured on the second take." The lyrics were written in under twenty minutes. It was recorded in two takes (without overdubs), and co-produced/engineered by the owner of the recording studio, Chip Young. The label pushed for "The Ways of a Woman in Love" to be the single, but Young insisted the hit was "I Can Help". However, other albums with Monument, A&M, and Epic did not have nearly the success of "I Can Help".

In 1979, Swan traveled to Havana, Cuba to participate in the historic Havana Jam festival from March 2–4 alongside Stephen Stills, the CBS Jazz All-Stars, the Trio of Doom, Fania All-Stars, Weather Report, Bonnie Bramlett, Mike Finnigan, Kris Kristofferson, Rita Coolidge, and Billy Joel plus an array of Cuban artists including Irakere, Pacho Alonso, Tata Güines, and Orquesta Aragón. Swan's performance is captured on Ernesto Juan Castellanos's documentary Havana Jam '79.

== Collaboration ==
Swan continued to tour as a member of Kristofferson's band and recorded with Randy Meisner of The Eagles. In 1986, as part of a band called Black Tie, he along with Meisner, Jimmy Griffin (Bread), David Kemper (drummer), David Miner, and David Mansfield recorded an album called When the Night Falls at a California studio (Bench Records). He recorded another solo album, Like Elvis Used to Do in 2000 and another Black Tie-style album with Meisner and Charlie Rich Jr. billed as "Meisner, Swan & Rich". As of 2005, Swan is still a backing singer and session musician.

== Personal life ==
Swan was married to his late wife Marlu for 30 years. Marlu died on February 12, 2003, from cancer. They had two daughters, recording artists Planet Swan and Sierra Swan.

== Discography ==
=== Albums ===
Year	Album	Chart Positions				
Year	Album	US Country	US	AUS	CAN	NOR
1974	I Can Help (Monument)	1	21	20	34	3
1975	Rock 'n' Roll Moon (Monument)	29	—	—	—	13
1976	Billy Swan (Monument)	28	—	—	—	—
1977	Four (Monument (CBS))	—	—	—	—	—
1978	You're OK, I'm OK (A&M)	—	—	—	—	—
1981	I'm into Lovin' You (Epic)	—	—	—	—	—

=== Singles ===
Year	Single	Chart Positions								
Year	Single	US Country	US	US AC	CAN Country	CAN	CAN AC	GER	AUS	UK
1974	"I Can Help"	1	1	6	1	2	4	1	1	6
1975	"I'm Her Fool"	—	53	—	—	93	—	—	—	—
1975	"Don't Be Cruel"	—	—	—	—	—	—	26	—	42
1975	"Everything's the Same (Ain't Nothing Changed)"	17	91	—	29	62	—	36	84	—
1976	"Just Want to Taste Your Wine" (with The Jordanaires)	45	—	—	—	—	—	—	—	—
1976	"You're the One"	75	—	—	—	—	—	—	—	—
1976	"Shake, Rattle and Roll"	95	—	—	—	—	—	—	—	—
1978	"Hello! Remember Me"	30	—	—	46	—	—	—	—	—
1978	"No Way Around (It's Love)"	97	—	—	—	—	—	—	—	—
1981	"Do I Have to Draw a Picture"	18	—	—	29	—	—	—	—	—
1981	"I'm into Lovin' You"	18	—	—	28	—	—	—	—	—
1981	"Stuck Right in the Middle of Your Love"	19	—	—	35	—	—	—	—	—
1982	"With Their Kind of Money and Our Kind of Love"	32	—	—	—	—	—	—	—	—
1982	"Your Picture Still Loves Me (And I Still Love You)"	56	—	—	—	—	—	—	—	—
1983	"Rainbows and Butterflies"	39	—	—	—	—	—	—	—	—
1983	"Yes"	67	—	—	—	—	—	—	—	—
1986	"You Must Be Lookin' for Me"	45	—	—	—	—	—	—	—	—
1987	"I'm Gonna Get You"	63	—	—	—	—	—	—	—	—

== See also ==
- List of artists who reached number one in the United States
- List of 1970s one-hit wonders in the United States
- List of artists who reached number one on the Australian singles chart
- List of performers on Top of the Pops
