= She Is His Only Need =

Single by Wynonna Judd

from the album Wynonna
- B-side: "No One Else on Earth"
- Released: January 28, 1992
- Genre: Country
- Length: 4:27
- Label: MCA/Curb
- Songwriter: Dave Loggins
- Producer: Tony Brown

Wynonna Judd singles chronology
"She Is His Only Need" (1992)	"I Saw the Light" (1992)

"She Is His Only Need" is a song written by Dave Loggins, and recorded by American country music artist Wynonna Judd. It was Wynonna's first solo single, after spending nine years alongside her mother, Naomi Judd, as The Judds. It was released in January 1992 as the first single from Wynonna's self-titled debut album. The song was her first Number One hit on the Billboard Hot Country Singles & Tracks (now Hot Country Songs) charts.

== Content ==
The song is a country pop ballad that chronicles the life of two characters. The first is a loner, named Billy, who is reluctant to leave southern Arizona, until he meets the song's other character, a woman named Bonnie. In the first verse, he befriends Bonnie and eventually marries her. According to the chorus, his love for her drives him to work overtime in order to buy her things that he knew she wanted because "she is his only need". The second verse follows their marriage as they have two children who grow up and move away from home. Even as the couple become elderly, the love continues to drive him to go out of his way to buy her things that he has heard her mention she wanted.

== Promotion ==
Wynonna promoted "She Is His Only Need" by releasing a compact disc which consisted of her introducing herself and asking radio to play the single. The CD's announcement ended with "And my only need is for y'all to play it. Because I have a mom to support. So thanks." This was a reference to her mother, Naomi Judd, who had retired due to a bout of hepatitis.

== Personnel ==
The following musicians performed on this track:

- Eddie Bayers – drums
- Wynonna Judd – lead and background vocals
- Dave Loggins – background vocals
- Steve Nathan – keyboards
- Don Potter – acoustic guitar
- Judy Rodman – background vocals
- Matt Rollings – keyboards
- Steuart Smith – electric guitar
- Willie Weeks – bass guitar

== Chart performance ==
Chart (1992)	Peak position
Canada Adult Contemporary (RPM)	22
Canada Country Singles (RPM)	1
US Adult Contemporary (Billboard)	25
US Hot Country Songs (Billboard)	1

=== Year-end charts ===
Chart (1992)	Position
Canada Country Tracks (RPM)	3
US Country Songs (Billboard)	18
