= The River (Garth Brooks song) =

Single by Garth Brooks

from the album Ropin' the Wind
- B-side: "We Bury the Hatchet"
- Released: April 27, 1992
- Recorded: 1991
- Studio: Jack's Tracks (Nashville, Tennessee)
- Genre: Country
- Length: 4:25
- Label: Liberty
- Songwriters: Victoria Shaw; Garth Brooks
- Producer: Allen Reynolds

Garth Brooks singles chronology
"Papa Loved Mama" (1992)	"The River" (1992)	"Whatcha Gonna Do with a Cowboy" (1992)

"The River" is a song co-written and recorded by American country music singer Garth Brooks. In late 1992, it became his ninth number-one hit on the Billboard country charts. It was released in April 1992 as the fifth and final single from his album Ropin' the Wind, and it has appeared on three albums that have sold more than ten million copies each in the US alone, these being Ropin' the Wind, The Hits and Double Live. The song was written by Garth Brooks and Victoria Shaw.

== Content ==
The song is a mid-tempo country pop ballad in which a river is used as an analogy for the pursuit of one's dreams. Through the lyrics, the narrator says that he will continue to pursue his dreams.

== Background and production ==
Garth provided the following background information on the song in the CD booklet liner notes from The Hits:

"Of all songs, most of the letters I receive concern "The River." It is a song of inspiration... a song that I will be proud of a hundred years from now. Victoria Shaw is a wonderful writer and a friend. This is what happens when two dreamers get together and write from the heart. One of the greatest awards that this song has ever received was the fact that it was played at Dale Wehr's funeral. Quite an honor, cowboy."

Additional personnel on the song included Kenny Malone on percussion, Edgar Meyer on acoustic bass, and Trisha Yearwood on harmony vocals.

Garth has stated that The River was inspired by childhood hero James Taylor.

== Critical reception ==
Allmusic critic Stephen Thomas Erlewine described the song as an "ambitious epic". Entertainment Weekly critic Ken Tucker considered it a standout track on the album, saying it "showcase[d]…his ability to imbue baleful country ballads with complex, soulful emotions."

== Chart positions ==
Chart (1992)	Peak position
Canada Country Singles (RPM)	1
US Hot Country Songs (Billboard)	1

=== Year-end charts ===
Chart (1992)	Position
Canada Country Tracks (RPM)	35
US Country Songs (Billboard)	43
