= What She's Doing Now =

Single by Garth Brooks

from the album Ropin' the Wind
- B-side: "Friends in Low Places"
- Released: December 6, 1991
- Studio: Jack's Tracks (Nashville, Tennessee)
- Genre: Country
- Length: 3:26
- Label: Liberty
- Songwriters: Pat Alger, Garth Brooks
- Producer: Allen Reynolds

Garth Brooks singles chronology
| "Shameless" (1991) | "What She's Doing Now" (1991) | "Papa Loved Mama" (1992) |

"What She's Doing Now" is a song co-written and recorded by American country music singer Garth Brooks. It was released in December 1991 as the third single from his album Ropin' the Wind. It spent four weeks at the top of the Billboard Hot Country Singles & Tracks chart. It was co-written by Pat Alger.

== Content ==
The song is a ballad about a man who wonders what his former lover is currently doing and what her whereabouts are ("last I heard she had moved to Boulder"). While the singer has no idea what she is doing now, he proclaims "what she's doing now is tearing [him] apart".

== Background and production ==
Brooks provided the following background information on the song in the CD booklet liner notes from The Hits:

"What She's Doing Now" was an idea I had a long, long time about a man wondering what a woman was doing. And it was very simple. What is she doing now? Is she hanging out the clothes? Is she running a business? Is she a mother? Is she married? Who is she with? When I told the idea to Pat Alger, he looked at me with a smile and said, "I wonder if she knows what she's doing now to me?" When I heard that, the bumps went over my arms and the back of my neck, and I knew that he had something. Crystal Gayle cut this song back in 1989. It came back to us for the Ropin' The Wind album. It is a song that has crossed all boundaries and borders around the world. This has made me extremely happy because the greatest gift a writer can ask for is to relate to someone. I can't help but think that this song might relate to a lot of people.

== Other versions ==
While Garth Brooks penned the song, he was not the first person to release it. On the 1990 release Ain't Gonna Worry, Crystal Gayle recorded the song as "What He's Doing Now"; her version was not released as a single.

== Track listing ==
European CD single

Liberty CDCL 656

1. "What She's Doing Now"
2. "Shameless"
3. "We Bury The Hatchet"

US 7" Jukebox single

Liberty S7-57784

1. "What She's Doing Now"
2. "Friends in Low Places"

== Chart positions ==
| Chart (1991–1992) | Peak position |
|---|---|
| Canada Country Singles (RPM) | 1 |
| US Hot Country Songs (Billboard) | 1 |

=== Year-end charts ===
| Chart (1992) | Position |
|---|---|
| Canada Country Tracks (RPM) | 2 |
| US Country Songs (Billboard) | 4 |
