= Doug Stone discography =

- Studio albums: 10
- Compilation albums: 3
- Singles: 33
- Music videos: 13
- #1 Singles: 6

The discography of American country music singer Doug Stone consists of ten studio albums and 33 singles.

His self-titled debut album was released in 1990 on Epic Records. The album produced three top 10 singles, and a number one single, "In a Different Light". The album reached #12 on the Billboard Top Country Albums chart, and was certified Platinum by the RIAA. I Thought It Was You, his second album, was also certified platinum. It was followed by a Christmas album and 1992's gold-certified From the Heart.

A fourth album for Epic, the gold More Love, featured songs from the film Gordy, his acting debut. After a greatest hits package in 1995, he released Faith in Me, Faith in You on Columbia Records. This album produced no Top 10 hits, however, and Stone did not release any albums until 1999's Make Up in Love on Atlantic Records, followed by the unsuccessful The Long Way on Audium. In 2005, Stone signed to Lofton Creek Records. Since signing, he has released two studio albums for the label. Neither album produced a charting single.

== Studio albums ==
=== 1990s ===
Title	Details	Peak chart positions			Certifications (sales threshold)
Title	Details	US Country	US	CAN Country	Certifications (sales threshold)
Doug Stone	Release date: March 12, 1990; Label: Epic Records; Formats: CD, cassette	12	97	—	US: Platinum
I Thought It Was You	Release date: August 13, 1991; Label: Epic Records; Formats: CD, cassette	12	74	—	US: Platinum
From the Heart	Release date: August 11, 1992; Label: Epic Records; Formats: CD, cassette	19	99	—	US: Gold
The First Christmas	Release date: September 15, 1992; Label: Epic Records; Formats: CD, cassette	53	186	—	
More Love	Release date: November 16, 1993; Label: Epic Records; Formats: CD, cassette	20	88	5	CAN: Gold; US: Gold
Faith in Me, Faith in You	Release date: March 28, 1995; Label: Columbia Nashville; Formats: CD, cassette	45	—	—	
Make Up in Love	Release date: September 7, 1999; Label: Atlantic Records; Formats: CD, cassette	38	—	—	
"—" denotes releases that did not chart

=== 2000s ===
Title	Details
The Long Way	Release date: September 24, 2002; Label: Audium/Koch Records; Formats: CD, cassette
In a Different Light	Release date: March 15, 2005; Label: Lofton Creek Records; Formats: CD, music download
My Turn	Release date: September 18, 2007; Label: Lofton Creek Records; Formats: CD, music download

== Compilation albums ==
Title	Details	Peak chart positions			Certifications (sales thresholds)
Title	Details	US Country	US	CAN Country	Certifications (sales thresholds)
Greatest Hits, Vol. 1	Release date: November 8, 1994; Label: Epic Records; Formats: CD, cassette	29	142	20	US: Gold
Super Hits	Release date: March 4, 1997; Label: Columbia Nashville; Formats: CD, cassette	—	—	—	
Live at Billy Bob's Texas	Release date: January 13, 2009; Label: Smith Music Group; Formats: CD, music download	—	—	—	
"—" denotes releases that did not chart

== Singles ==
=== 1990s ===
Year	Single	Peak positions			Album
Year	Single	US Country	US	CAN Country	Album
1990	"I'd Be Better Off (In a Pine Box)"	4	—	5	Doug Stone
1990	"Fourteen Minutes Old"	6	—	5	Doug Stone
1990	"These Lips Don't Know How to Say Goodbye"	5	—	2	Doug Stone
1991	"In a Different Light"	1	—	1	Doug Stone
1991	"I Thought It Was You"	4	—	1	I Thought It Was You
1991	"A Jukebox with a Country Song"	1	—	1	I Thought It Was You
1992	"Come In Out of the Pain"	3	—	3	I Thought It Was You
1992	"Warning Labels"	4	—	6	From the Heart
1992	"Too Busy Being in Love"	1	—	1	From the Heart
1993	"Made for Lovin' You"	6	—	15	From the Heart
1993	"Why Didn't I Think of That"	1	—	6	From the Heart
1993	"I Never Knew Love"	2	81	3	More Love
1994	"Addicted to a Dollar"	4	—	1	More Love
1994	"More Love"	6	—	4	More Love
1994	"Little Houses"	7	—	20	Greatest Hits, Vol. 1
1995	"Faith in Me, Faith in You"	13	—	20	Faith in Me, Faith in You
1995	"Sometimes I Forget"	41	—	38	Faith in Me, Faith in You
1995	"Born in the Dark"	12	—	14	Faith in Me, Faith in You
1998	"Gone Out of My Mind"	48	—	56	Tribute to Tradition
1999	"Make Up in Love"	19	— (Note: "Make Up in Love" did not enter the Hot 100, but peaked at number 5 on Bubbling Under Hot 100 Singles, which acts as a 25-song extension of the Hot 100.)	25	Make Up in Love
1999	"Take a Letter Maria"	45	—	—	Make Up in Love
"—" denotes releases that did not chart

=== 2000s ===
Year	Single	Peak positions	Album
Year	Single	US Country	Album
2000	"Surprise"	64	Make Up in Love
2002	"POW 369"	—	The Long Way
2004	"How Do I Get Off the Moon"	—	In a Different Light
2004	"Georgia on My Mind"	—	In a Different Light
2005	"Only You (And You Alone)"	—	In a Different Light
2005	"World Goes Round"	—	In a Different Light
2005	"Everything"	—	In a Different Light
2006	"Time"	—	In a Different Light
2006	"Let the Light Shine on You"	—	In a Different Light
2007	"Nice Problem"	—	My Turn
2008	"She Always Gets What She Wants"	—	My Turn
2008	"Don't Tell Mama"	—	My Turn
"—" denotes releases that did not chart

== Music videos ==
Year	Title	Director
1990	"I'd Be Better Off (In a Pine Box)"	Deaton Flanigen
1990	"These Lips Don't Know How to Say Goodbye"	Deaton Flanigen
1991	"I Thought It Was You"	Marius Penczner
1991	"A Jukebox with a Country Song"	Peter Lippman
1992	"Warning Labels"	Wayne Miller
1992	"Sailing Home for Christmas"	Michael Merriman
1992	"Too Busy Being in Love"	Michael Merriman
1993	"Made for Lovin' You"	Greg Travis
1993	"I Never Knew Love"	Jon Small
1994	"Addicted to a Dollar"	Marius Penczner
1994	"Little Houses"	Marius Penczner
1995	"Faith in Me, Faith in You"	Deaton Flanigen
2006	"Time"	John Scarpati
