= Greatest Hits, Vol. 1 (Doug Stone album) =

Album by Doug Stone

Greatest hits album by Doug Stone
- Released: November 8, 1994
- Genre: Country
- Length: 34:32
- Label: Epic
- Producer: various

Doug Stone chronology
More Love (1993)	Greatest Hits, Vol. 1 (1994)	Faith in Me, Faith in You (1995)

Singles from Greatest Hits Vol. 1
- 1. "Little Houses" Released: October 1994

Professional ratings
Review scores
Source	Rating
Allmusic	link

Greatest Hits, Vol. 1 is the first compilation album by American country music artist Doug Stone. Nine of the album's ten tracks were previously included on his first three studio albums; the first track, the newly recorded "Little Houses", was issued as a single in 1994, peaking at #7 on the Billboard Hot Country Singles & Tracks (now Hot Country Songs) charts. This was also his last album for Epic Records.

== Track listing ==
No.	Title	Writer(s)	Length
1.	"Little Houses"	Skip Ewing, Mickey Cates	3:37
2.	"Too Busy Being in Love"	Gary Burr, Victoria Shaw	3:54
3.	"A Jukebox with a Country Song"	Gene Nelson, Ronnie Samoset	3:29
4.	"Made for Lovin' You"	Curly Putman, Sonny Throckmorton	3:07
5.	"Why Didn't I Think of That"	Paul Harrison, Bob McDill	3:11
6.	"In a Different Light"	Bucky Jones, Dickey Lee, McDill	3:38
7.	"Come In Out of the Pain"	Frank J. Myers, Don Pfrimmer	3:51
8.	"Warning Labels"	Kim Williams, Oscar Turman	2:58
9.	"I Thought It Was You"	Tim Mensy, Gary Harrison	3:27
10.	"I'd Be Better Off (In a Pine Box)"	Johnny MacRae, Steve Clark	3:20

== Charts ==
=== Weekly charts ===
Chart (1994–95)	Peak position
Canadian Country Albums (RPM)	20
US Billboard 200	142
US Top Country Albums (Billboard)	29

=== Year-end charts ===
Chart (1995)	Position
US Top Country Albums (Billboard)	65
