= The Long Way =

Studio album by Doug Stone
- Released: September 24, 2002
- Genre: Country
- Label: Audium/Koch
- Producer: Chet Hinesley

Doug Stone chronology
Make Up in Love (1999)	The Long Way (2002)	In a Different Light (2005)

Professional ratings
Review scores
Source	Rating
Allmusic	3/5 stars

The Long Way is the ninth studio album released by American country music artist Doug Stone. It was his only release for the Audium Entertainment label, and its only single ("POW 369", also recorded by Darryl Worley on his 2002 album I Miss My Friend) failed to enter the Billboard country music charts.

The album's last three tracks are new re-recordings of songs previously included on Stone's earlier albums: "More Love" from the 1994 album of the same name, "Born in the Dark" from 1995's Faith in Me, Faith in You, and "I'd Be Better Off (In a Pine Box)" from his 1991 self-titled debut album.

== Track listing ==
1. "I'm Losing You" (Monty Criswell, Tim Schoepf) – 3:19
2. "The Long Way" (Criswell, Billy Yates) – 3:43
3. "One Heartache at a Time" (Gary Burr, Cynthia Weil) – 3:53
4. "Poor Man's Blvd." (Doug Stone, Chet Hinesley) – 3:41
5. "POW 369" (Steven Dale Jones) – 3:26
6. "Bone Dry" (Will Robinson, Jimmy Yeary) – 3:27
7. "Lying to Myself" (Stone, Scott Shevel, Jimmy Devine, Lisa Zanghi) – 4:10
8. "More Love" (Burr, Stone) – 3:25
9. "Born in the Dark" (Hinesley) – 2:54
10. "I'd Be Better Off (In a Pine Box)" (Steve Clark, Johnny MacRae) – 3:24

== Personnel ==
- Mark Beckett - drums
- Rick Brothers - drums
- Wesley Buttrey - drums
- Timotheo Gonzalez - harmonica
- Buddy Hyatt - piano, strings
- Dionna Brooks-Jackson - background vocals
- Curtis Jay - bass guitar
- Mike Johnson - dobro, pedabro, steel guitar
- Dan Justice - acoustic guitar, electric guitar
- Seidina Reed - background vocals
- Rusty Van Sickle - background vocals
- Doug Stone - lead vocals
