= Armstrong-Jones =

Armstrong-Jones is a compound surname composed of Armstrong and Jones. Notable people with the surname include:

- Charles Armstrong-Jones, Viscount Linley (born 1999), the only son of the 2nd Earl of Snowdon
- Lady Sarah Armstrong-Jones (Lady Sarah Chatto) (born 1964), the only daughter of the 1st Earl of Snowdon and Princess Margaret
- Lady Margarita Armstrong-Jones (born 2002), the only daughter of the 2nd Earl of Snowdon
- Sir Robert Armstrong-Jones, CBE (1857–1943), born Robert Jones, Welsh physician and psychiatrist
- Ronald Armstrong-Jones MBE QC (1899–1966), British barrister and soldier and the father of Antony Armstrong-Jones, 1st Earl of Snowdon
- Anthony Armstrong Jones (1949–1996), American country music singer known by his stage name
- David Armstrong-Jones, 2nd Earl of Snowdon (born 1961), English furniture maker and chairman of the auction house Christie's UK
- Serena Armstrong-Jones, Countess of Snowdon (born 1970), Anglo-Irish aristocrat, and by marriage, a niece-in-law of Queen Elizabeth II and Prince Philip, Duke of Edinburgh
- Antony Armstrong-Jones, 1st Earl of Snowdon, GCVO, RDI (1930–2017), English photographer and film maker
