= In a Different Light (Doug Stone album) =

Studio album by Doug Stone
- Released: March 15, 2005
- Genre: Country
- Label: Lofton Creek
- Producer: Mike Borchetta, John Mills, Doug Stone

Doug Stone chronology
The Long Way (2002)	In a Different Light (2005)	My Turn (2007)

In a Different Light is the tenth studio album released by American country music artist Doug Stone. It was his first album for Lofton Creek Records. Two re-recordings of his older songs are included here: "In a Different Light" (originally on his 1990 album Doug Stone) and "Why Didn't I Think of That" (originally on his 1992 album From the Heart). Also included are four covers: "Georgia on My Mind" (the official state song for the state of Georgia), and "Only You (And You Alone)" (originally recorded by The Platters). and Crazy Love (originally recorded by Van Morrison) and tell it like it is (originally recorded by Aaron Neville)

== Track listing ==
1. "Georgia on My Mind" (Stuart Gorrell, Hoagy Carmichael) – 4:03
2. "Time" (Steve Nelson, Suzanna Spring) – 3:40
3. "World Goes Round" (Brian Beathard, Jimmy Devine) – 2:50
4. "How Do I Get Off the Moon" (Randy Boudreaux, Donny Kees, Kerry Kurt Phillips) – 3:56
5. "Only You (And You Alone)" (Buck Ram, Ande Rand) – 3:16
6. "The Beginning of the End" (Jeff Jones, Rusty VanSickle) – 3:38
7. "Crazy Love" (Van Morrison) – 3:05
8. "Everything" (J. Jones, VanSickle, Terry Clayton) – 3:52
9. "To Be a Man" (Jeff Dayton, VanSickle) – 3:46
10. "Let the Light Shine on You" (Boudreaux, Blake Mevis) – 3:03
11. "Millionaire" (Devine) – 3:09
12. "Tell It Like It Is" (George Davis, Lee Diamond) – 3:40
13. "In a Different Light" (Bucky Jones, Dickey Lee, Bob McDill) – 3:39
14. "Why Didn't I Think of That" (Paul Harrison, McDill) – 3:12

== Personnel ==
- Bobby All - acoustic guitar
- Jeff Brock - background vocals
- Wesley Buttrey - percussion
- Mike Chapman - bass guitar
- David Davidson - fiddle, violin
- Barry Green - tenor trombone
- Owen Hale - drums
- Mike Haynes - trumpet
- Curtis Jay - bass guitar, Hammond organ
- Mike Johnson - steel guitar
- Jerry Kimbrough - 12-string guitar, acoustic guitar, electric guitar, gut string guitar
- Sam Levine - tenor saxophone, clarinet
- Derek Mixon - drums
- Russ Pahl - banjo, dobro, steel guitar
- Matt Rawlins - piano
- Dan Shough - acoustic guitar, electric guitar
- Rusty Van Sickle - background vocals
- Gary Smith - clavinet, Hammond organ, piano, electric piano, synthesizer
- Joe Spivey - fiddle
- Doug Stone - lead vocals
- Kerry West - acoustic guitar, electric guitar
- Curtis Wright - background vocals
- Jonathan Yudkin - fiddle, mandolin, tambur, viola, violin
- Lisa Zanghi - background vocals
