= More Love =

More Love may refer to:

- More Love (album), by Doug Stone, 1993
  - "More Love" (Doug Stone song), the title song
- "More Love" (Feargal Sharkey song), 1988
- "More Love" (Smokey Robinson & the Miracles song), 1967; covered by Kim Carnes, 1980

== See also ==
- More Love Songs, an album by Loudon Wainwright III, 1986
