= Bontnewydd, Gwynedd =

Village and community in Gwynedd, Wales

Bontnewydd
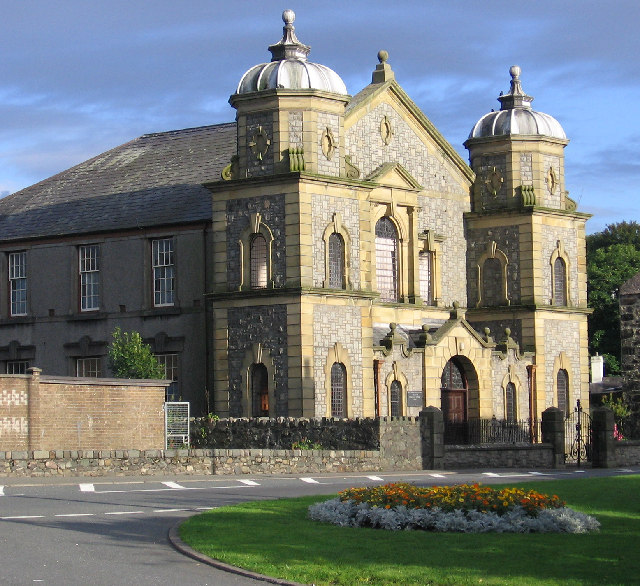
- Chapel at Bontnewydd in 2005

- Location within Gwynedd
- Population: 1,162 (2011)
- OS grid reference: SH483601
- Community: Bontnewydd
- Principal area: Gwynedd
- Preserved county: Gwynedd
- Country: Wales
- Sovereign state: United Kingdom
- Post town: CAERNARFON
- Postcode district: LL54
- Postcode district: LL55
- Dialling code: 01286
- Police: North Wales
- Fire: North Wales
- Ambulance: Welsh
- UK Parliament: Dwyfor Meirionnydd
- Senedd Cymru – Welsh Parliament: Gwynedd Maldwyn
- List of places UK Wales Gwynedd 53.117°N 4.268°W Map of the community

Bontnewydd (Welsh for 'new bridge'; standardised as Y Bontnewydd) is a small village and community with a population of 1,162 located on the A487 road 1 2/3 miles (2.7 km) south of Caernarfon in Gwynedd, Wales, close to the river Gwyrfai, 2 miles (3.2 km) from its outflow into Foryd Bay.

It is served by Bontnewydd railway station, an unstaffed halt on the Welsh Highland Railway. The village has one small supermarket, an outdoor attraction called Gypsy Wood Park, a pub called The Newborough Arms and one school. Bontnewydd was known as Bodallog prior to the new bridge being built.

Since 1995 Bontnewydd has also formed an electoral ward, represented by a county councillor on Gwynedd Council.

The community includes Llanfaglan.

The village is the location of Plas Dinas, the ancestral family home of Antony Armstrong-Jones, 1st Earl of Snowdon, the husband of Princess Margaret. Armstrong-Jones's paternal grandfather was Sir Robert Armstrong-Jones, a Welsh psychiatrist.

== Welsh language ==
According to the 2021 Census, 82.6% of Bontnewydd residents aged three and over reported being able to speak Welsh — the same proportion as recorded in the 2011 Census. In 2011, Bontnewydd had the third highest percentage of Welsh speakers among all communities in Wales. In the 2001 Census, a slightly higher figure of 84.8% was reported.

== Education ==
Ysgol Gynradd Bontnewydd provides Welsh-medium primary education to the village and the surrounding area, including the villages Caeathro and Llanfaglan. As of 2024, there were 207 pupils enrolled at the school. 88.8% of statutory school age pupils at the school spoke Welsh at home in 2024.
