= In a Different Light =

In a Different Light may refer to:

- In a Different Light (Avalon album)
- In a Different Light (Linda Davis album)
- In a Different Light (Doug Stone album)

- "In a Different Light" (song), this album's title track, originally found on Stone's self-titled debut album

- In a Different Light (Everclear album)
- In a Different Light: An Anthology of Lesbian Writers, a 1990 Stonewall Honor Book edited by Carolyn Weathers and Jenny Wrenn
