= A Different Light =

A Different Light may refer to:

- A Different Light (album), a 2007 album by the band Sherwood
- A Different Light (bookstore), an LGBT bookstore chain that operated from 1979 to 2011
- A Different Light, a 1978 science fiction novel by Elizabeth Lynn

== See also ==
- Different Light, a 1986 album by The Bangles
- In a Different Light (disambiguation)
