= Made for Lovin' You =

Made for Lovin' You may refer to:

- "Made for Lovin' You" (Dan Seals song), also recorded by Clinton Gregory and Doug Stone
- "Made for Lovin' You" (Anastacia song)

== See also ==
- "I Was Made for Lovin' You"
