= Anthony Armstrong Jones =

American singer-songwriter (1949–1996)

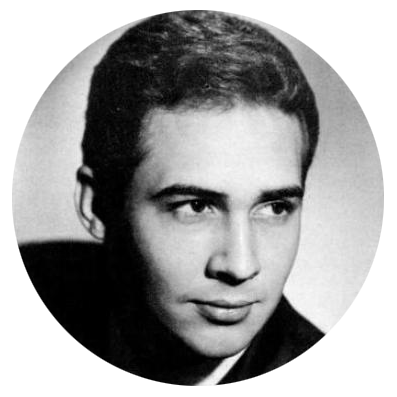
- Jones in 1969

Background information
- Born: Ronnie Jones; June 2, 1949
- Origin: Ada, Oklahoma, United States
- Died: June 16, 1996 (aged 47)
- Genres: Country
- Occupation: Singer
- Instrument: Vocals
- Years active: 1968–1986
- Labels: Chart, Epic, Homa, Air

Ronnie Jones (June 2, 1949 – June 16, 1996) was an American country music singer known professionally as Anthony Armstrong Jones, a stage name that he took from the name of the British photographer who married Princess Margaret, Countess of Snowdon. A former professional golfer, Jones recorded four albums for Chart Records in that timespan, in addition to charting six times in the Top 40 on the Billboard country singles charts. His debut single was a No. 22-peaking cover of "Proud Mary," originally by Creedence Clearwater Revival, which served as the title track of his first album. Its second single was "New Orleans," originally recorded by Gary U. S. Bonds.

Jones' second album, Take a Letter Maria, produced his biggest hit in its No. 8 title track, a cover of the pop hit for R. B. Greaves. Later that year, he released Sugar in the Flowers, which produced singles in "Lead Me Not into Temptation" and its title track. Finishing off his single releases that year was a rendition of Neil Diamond's "Sweet Caroline," which Jones recorded on Take a Letter Maria.

Jones later moved to Epic Records, where he charted three singles in 1973, including a No. 33 cover of Jim Croce's "Bad, Bad Leroy Brown". He recorded for Homa Records in the 1970s but did not have any chart success, and charted for the last time in 1986 with the No. 74 "Those Eyes" on the Air label. After retiring from the music business, Jones founded a club called Proud Mary in Shreveport, Louisiana. He died on June 16, 1996.

== Discography ==
=== Albums ===
Year	Album	Chart positions
Year	Album	US Country
1969	Proud Mary: Released: 1969; Label: Chart Records No. 1019; Format: LP	44
1970	Take a Letter Maria: Released: 1969; Label: Chart Records No. 1027; Format: LP	42
1970	Sugar in the Flowers: Released: 1970; Label: Chart Records #CHS-1036; Format: LP	—
1971	Greatest Hits: Released: 1971; Label: Chart Records #CHS-1047; Format: LP	—

=== Singles ===
Year	Single	Chart positions		Album
Year	Single	US Country	CAN Country	Album
1969	"Proud Mary"	22	—	Proud Mary
1969	"New Orleans"	28	—	Proud Mary
1970	"Take a Letter Maria"	8	8	Take a Letter Maria
1970	"Lead Me Not Into Temptation"	56	—	Sugar in the Flowers
1970	"One for the Road"^{A}	—	32	Sugar in the Flowers
1970	"Sugar in the Flowers"	38	38	Sugar in the Flowers
1970	"Sweet Caroline"	40	35	Take a Letter Maria
1973	"I'm Right Where I Belong"	70	—	singles only
1973	"Bad, Bad Leroy Brown"	33	83	singles only
1973	"I've Got Mine"	69	—	singles only
1986	"Those Eyes"	74	—	singles only

- ^{A}B-side to "Lead Me Not into Temptation."
