= Owen Roberts (educator) =

Welsh teacher (1835–1915)

Sir Owen John Roberts, JP, DL, DCL, LL.D (7 April 1835 – 6 January 1915) was a Welsh educationalist, who helped to pioneer technical education in London.

== Early life and education ==
Roberts was born at Tymawr, Clynnog, Carnarvonshire in 1835 a son of Owen Roberts, who was land agent to Thomas Assheton Smith, of Vaenol and Charles Griffiths Wynne, two of the greatest landowners in north Wales. His mother was Katherine, daughter of John Roberts of Castell, a respected family in the county. After receiving education at Tarvin Hall school in Chester, he went up to Jesus College, Oxford to read History. He was conferred a MA degree, and admitted to the Inner Temple, before being called to the bar in 1865. He joined the War Office on Pall Mall as a civil servant, but chose not to stay in the career.

== Career and later life ==
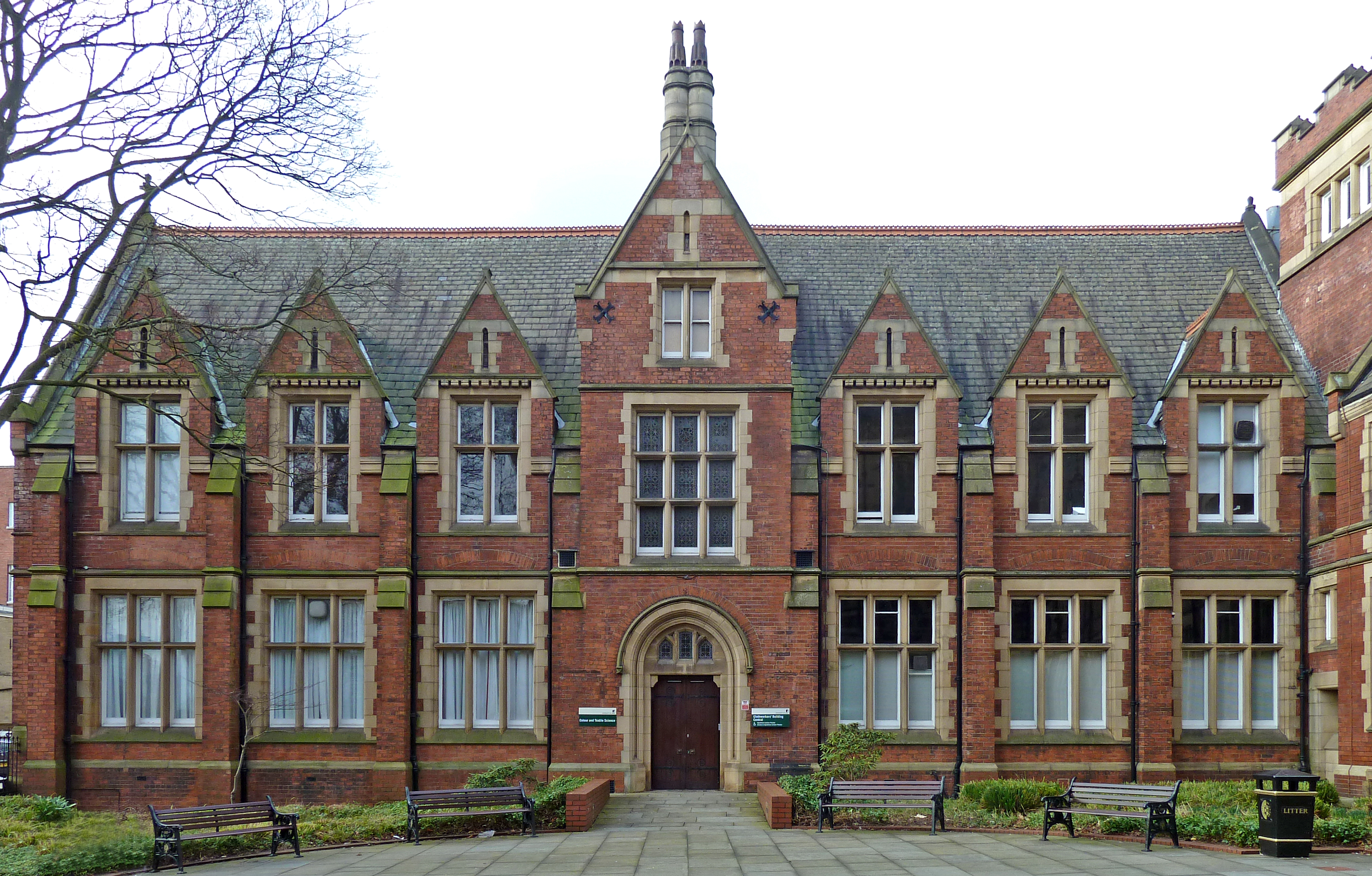
Clothworkers' Building, University of Leeds (Taken by Flickr user 8 February 2013)

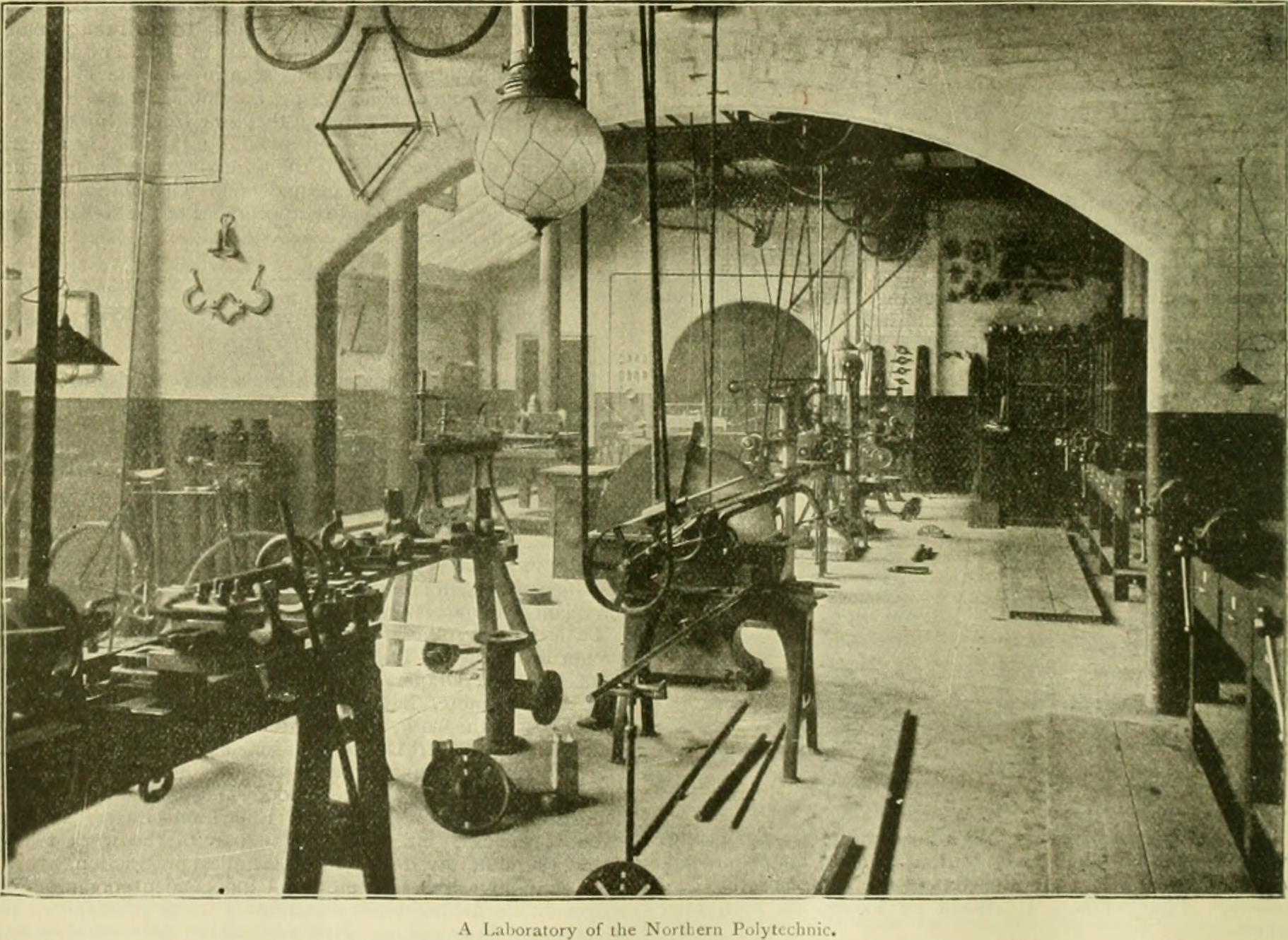
Northern Polytechnic Laboratory, Nature (1898) (14594982988)

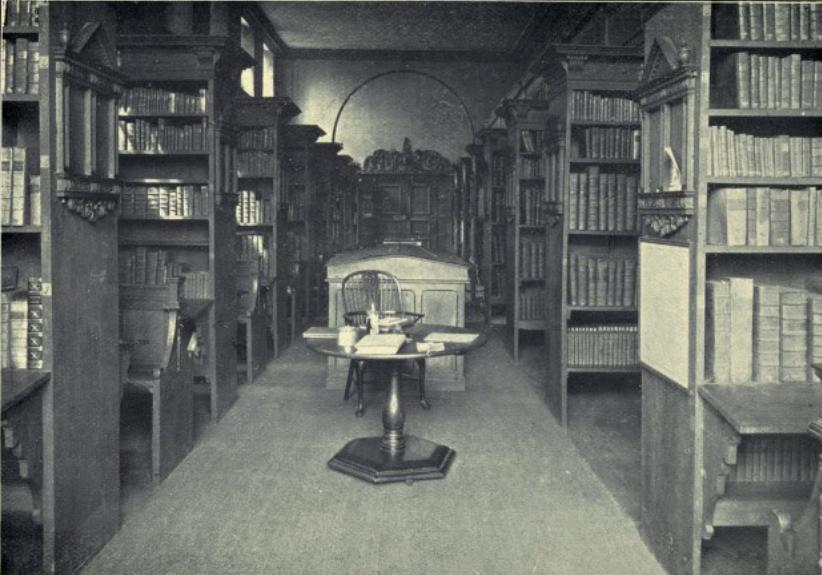
Jesus College Fellows' Library

Owen was appointed a director of the Improved Industrial Dwellings Association in London, and worked for many years in the Imperial Fire and Life Insurance Office. Roberts was asked to become Clerk to the Clothworkers' Company in 1866, largely because he was a fully qualified barrister, holding the office for over 40 years and becoming Master in 1909. He helped encourage the Yorkshire College at Leeds and University College, Bristol. A successful and active clerk he was instrumental in reviving the moribund sector. In 1870 the Gladstonian Education Act instructed the companies to organize greater facility for women and working-classes to expand the technical abilities. A bold plan was conceived to advance technical instruction by a triumvirate of company leaders, Sir William Sawyer (Drapers), Sir John Watson (Mercers) and Roberts himself. On New Year's Eve he gained one of many such appointments as one of three Governors of the University of North Wales for a statutory period of five years. The other two Sir Hugh Owen, and Dr Isambard Owen were well-known academics, also of Welsh descent whose national identity was intrinsic to the appointments. A regular membership of Cymmrodorion Society confirmed his own sense of Welshness.

He supported and promoted the radical idea of women's tertiary and secondary education funding scholarships to Newnham and Girton Colleges, Cambridge, as well as St Catherine's and Somerville Colleges, Oxford. He was personally involved in the public subscriptions towards a laboratory at Newnham and in extending the sciences more generally to women. He had an intimate connection with the Society for Promotion the Training of Women. (Note: "To Provide a scholarship for woman medical student under 23 years of age and who is a British subject..." were the words used by a charity, The Sir Owen Roberts Memorial Scholarship Fund set up, 1965-1993 specifically to fund female researchers in medecine.) In 1895, although no longer honorary secretary of the Higher Education Association, he still managed to persuade the Clothworkers Hall to donate £250 towards the founding of the London School of Economics, for which the Webbs were eternally grateful. He was active in setting up the City and Guilds of London Institute and Somerville College, Oxford. He was chairman of the London Polytechnic Council and a member of the governing body of Imperial College, under the auspices of the University London Act 1898, for which purposes he was a commissioner. Sir Owen was a member of the Royal Commission on Education and Training, of which no less than nine of the sixteen-man commission were knights and one peer-of-the-realm. Through his considerable gifts of zeal and commitment, Welsh lyricism he made it easier to determine how the extension of opportunity might be funded for the development of workers' education.

The chairman of Sir John Cass's Foundation, Sir Owen oversaw the transition from 10 Idol Lane to a new headquarters in Jewry Street in 1901. He was also chairman of St Dunstan's Educational Foundation 1895–1915. The secretary for both organisations was W H Davison, who was also his son-in-law. The Edwardian era was one of immense political and social change during which Sir Owen was chairman of a number of City of London institutions. From 1904 to 1915 he was Chairman of the City and Guilds Institute, supervising the regime for apprenticeships across London. He also served as vice-president, chairman of the council and treasurer of the Royal Society of Arts. The great scientist, Lord Kelvin "looked back with gratitude at all the many works he had done for good of the country," praising a man dedicated to the arts and education all his life, and in particular to its expansion. He promised help to the Labour movement at any available opportunity. On 8 May 1906, during a meeting he chaired at Finsbury Technical College he pledged the commitment of the Clothworkers Company towards expanding opportunities among its young subscribers. It coincided with a New Liberal government eager to extend radical schemes, yet was utterly consistent with Sir Owen's generosity, fervour and drive to idealise education for all.

== Family ==
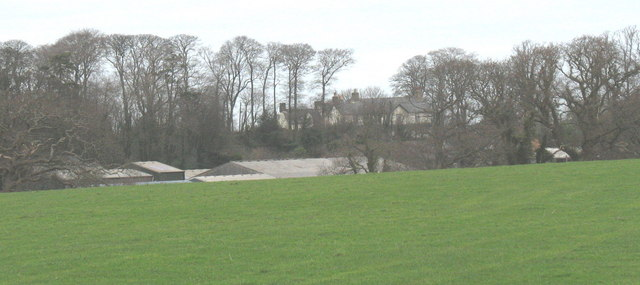
Plas Dinas, Roberts' home in Caernarfonshire, which passed to the Armstrong-Jones family upon his death

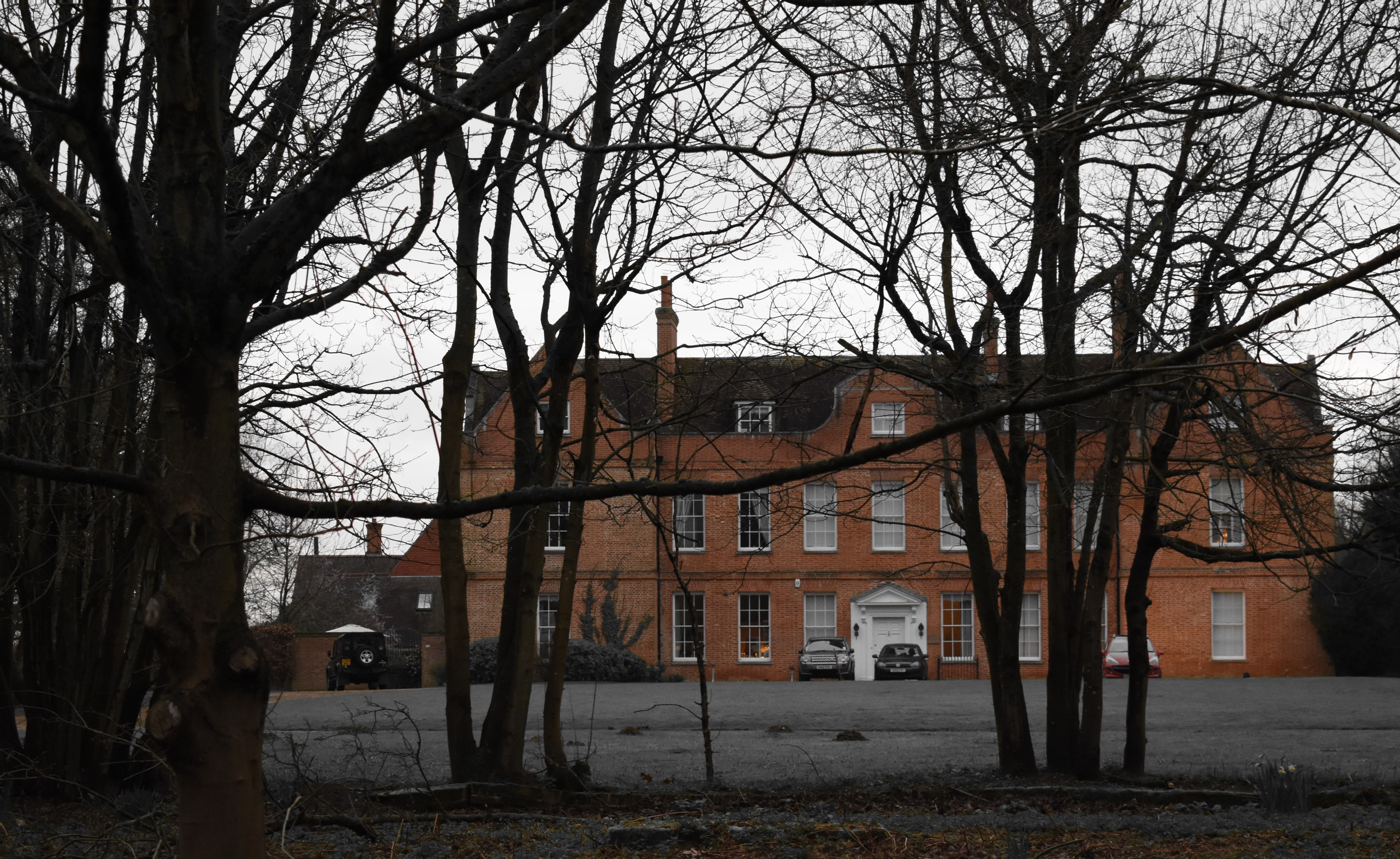
Winter at Henley Park Manor house in Surrey - Front view

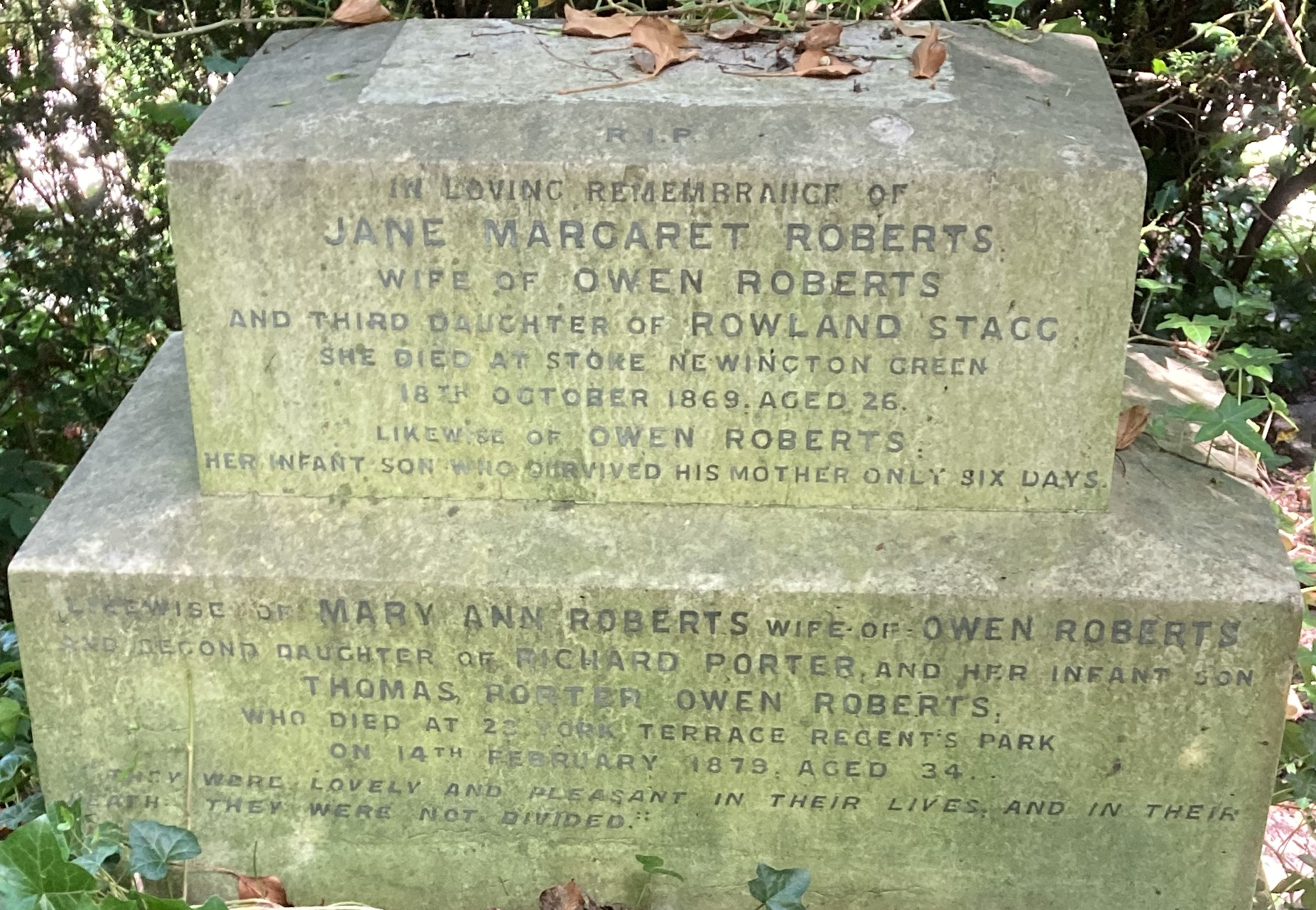
Family grave of Owen Roberts in Highgate Cemetery

By his first wife, Jane Armstrong (née Stagg), he had a daughter named Margaret Elizabeth, who studied at Somerville College, Oxford. She married Sir Robert Armstrong-Jones, grandfather of Antony Armstrong-Jones, 1st Earl of Snowdon. Their other daughter, Beatrice married Sir William Davison.

He died on 6 January 1915 at his home, Henley Park, near Guildford and was buried on the western side of Highgate Cemetery.

== Honours ==
Roberts was knighted in 1888 in recognition of the services he had rendered in the cause of technical education. His old Oxford college, Jesus, of which he was an Honorary Fellow remarked that he was "a practical patriot" naming among his contemporaries Sir Lewis Morris.

In life, he also was awarded a DCL degree by the University of Durham, United Kingdom, and an Honorary LLD degree by the University of Leeds in 1906. Jesus College elected him to an honorary fellowship in 1905.

Roberts was furthermore a Fellow of the Society of Arts (FSA), a Justice of the Peace (JP) and Deputy Lieutenant (DL) of Caernarfonshire and the County of London, and a Lord Lieutenant of the City of London and, in 1907, High Sheriff of Caernarvonshire.
