= Make Up in Love =

Studio album by Doug Stone
- Released: September 7, 1999
- Genre: Country
- Length: 34:04
- Label: Atlantic
- Producer: Doug Stone, Wally Wilson

Doug Stone chronology
Faith in Me, Faith in You (1995)	Make Up in Love (1999)	The Long Way (2002)

Singles from Make Up in Love
- 1. "Make Up in Love" Released: April 24, 1999

Professional ratings
Review scores
Source	Rating
Allmusic	link

Make Up in Love is the eighth studio album by American country music artist Doug Stone. Released in 1999 as his only album for Atlantic Records, it features the singles "Make up in Love,” a cover of R.B. Greaves' "Take a Letter, Maria", and “Surprise." The title track was the only one of these to chart in the Top 40 on the Billboard country charts. The track "The Difference Between a Woman and a Man" was later recorded by Josh Turner on his 2003 debut album Long Black Train.

== Track listing ==
No.	Title	Writer(s)	Length
1.	"Make Up in Love"	Danny Orton, Tony Ramey	3:58
2.	"Take a Letter Maria"	R. B. Greaves	2:51
3.	"The Heart Holds On" (duet with Leslie Satcher)	Paul Williams, Jon Vezner	3:30
4.	"Surprise"	Tony Haselden	3:04
5.	"Oh Moon"	Tom Shapiro, Sharon Vaughn, Wally Wilson	3:34
6.	"Not Me"	Byron Hill, Danny Orton	2:47
7.	"Deeper Than That"	Brenda Anderson, Tim Mensy	3:34
8.	"One Saturday"	Neil Thrasher, Ed Berghoff	2:41
9.	"A Room Without a View"	Gary Burr, Doug Stone	3:34
10.	"The Difference Between a Woman and a Man"	Bobby Braddock	4:24

== Personnel ==
- Bobby All - acoustic guitar
- Pat Buchanan - electric guitar
- Mark Casstevens - acoustic guitar
- Jim Collins - background vocals
- Kenny Greenberg - electric guitar
- Rob Hajacos - fiddle
- Owen Hale - drums
- Liana Manis - background vocals
- Michael Rhodes - bass guitar
- Mike Rojas - piano
- John Wesley Ryles - background vocals
- Scotty Sanders - steel guitar, Dobro
- Leslie Satcher - background vocals on "The Heart Holds On"
- Doug Stone - lead vocals
- Willie Weeks - bass guitar
- Lonnie Wilson - drums
- Glenn Worf - bass guitar

Strings by The Nashville String Machine

== Chart performance ==
Chart (1999)	Peak position
U.S. Billboard Top Country Albums	38
