= Plas Dinas =

Country house in Gwynedd, Wales

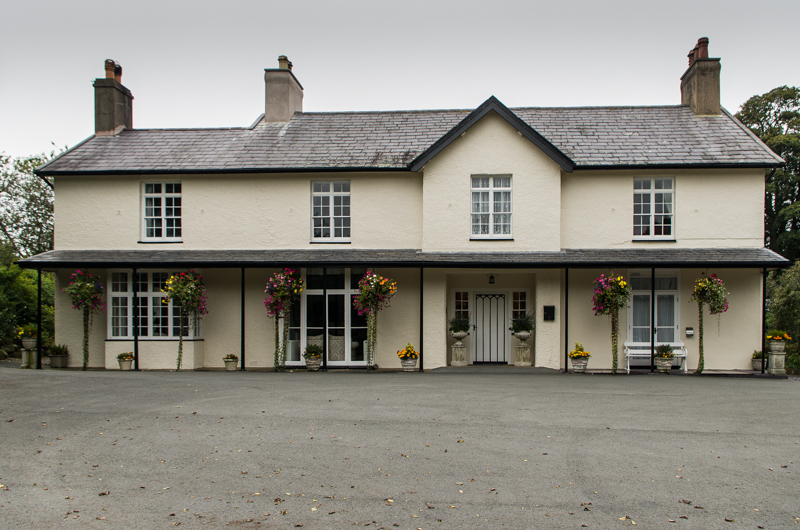
- Front of the building
- Interactive map of the Plas Dinas area

General information
- Type: Country house Hotel (since 1990s)
- Location: Bontnewydd, Gwynedd, Wales
- Coordinates: 53°06′31″N 04°16′32″W
- Construction started: Early 17th century

Listed Building – Grade II
- Official name: Plas Dinas
- Designated: 29 May 1968
- Reference no.: 3809

Plas Dinas is a Grade II listed building in Bontnewydd, Gwynedd, near Caernarfon in North Wales, between the Welsh coast and the Snowdonia mountains. It is a large country house which retains significant features of an early 17th-century house at its core.

Since 1915 the estate has been in the hands of the Armstrong-Jones family. Antony Armstrong-Jones, 1st Earl of Snowdon spent much time there, including with Princess Margaret during their marriage from 1960 to 1978.

Since the 1990s the mansion has been a country house hotel, now called Plas Dinas Country House.

== History ==
Plas Dinas is a large country house incorporating an early 17th-century house. It had a later 17th-century addition as well as major 19th-century additions. From its mid-17th century expansion it has a reset gritstone tablet dated 1653, with a coat of arms and inscribed with "T . W I . W" for Thomas and Jane Williams. Thomas Williams was a son of Sir Thomas Williams of Vaynol, and was Sheriff of Caernarvonshire from 1647 to 1648.

The house was enlarged in the Victorian era. It was the home of Owen Roberts, land agent to the wealthy Thomas Assheton Smith family. In the early 20th century his son, barrister and education pioneer Sir Owen Roberts, lived at Plas Dinas when he was not occupied in England. Upon the death of Sir Owen Roberts in 1915, Plas Dinas passed to his daughter Margaret Elizabeth, who in 1893 had married Sir Robert Armstrong-Jones, a Welsh psychiatrist.

In the 20th century Plas Dinas was owned by three generations of the Armstrong-Jones family, including Sir Robert Armstrong-Jones's son Ronald Armstrong-Jones, Q.C., who was the father of Lord Snowdon. When the Armstrong-Jones family moved to the London area, they retained Plas Dinas as their country home. Upon the death of Ronald Armstrong-Jones in 1966, the Plas Dinas estate was bequeathed to Snowdon's much younger half-brother Peregrine Armstrong-Jones.

At the entrance to the drive is Plas Dinas lodge. During the Second World War, there was prisoner of war camp in the field across the drive from the lodge. In 1946, at the age of 16, Lord Snowden was holidaying at Plas Dinas when he contracted polio.

The home was designated a listed building on 29 May 1968.

Princess Margaret, who was married to Lord Snowdon from 1960 to 1978, spent many weekends at Plas Dinas with him, particularly after Snowdon was appointed Constable of Caernarfon Castle in 1963, and later was designing and organising the investiture of Prince Charles as Prince of Wales, which was held at Caernarfon Castle in 1969.

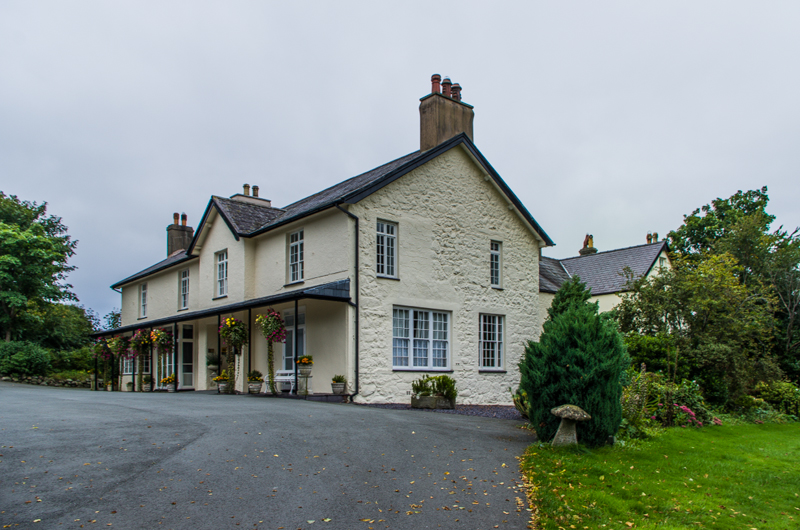
Plas Dinas, looking west-northwest (2013)

In the 1980s, the Armstrong-Jones family leased out the house as a nursing home, before it was converted to a hotel in the 1990s. Proprietors have been running it as Plas Dinas Country House, a 5-star country house hotel, since the mid 2000s. It still contains many Armstrong-Jones family portraits, memorabilia, and original furniture. The hotel includes a restaurant, The Gunroom, which contains the original early 17th-century stone fireplace that the mansion was built around over the centuries. In 2022 the restaurant was added to the Michelin Guide after inspectors were impressed with the food and its presentation.
