= Little Houses =

Single by Doug Stone

from the album Greatest Hits, Vol. 1
- B-side: "I'd Be Better Off (In a Pine Box)"
- Released: October 1994
- Genre: Country
- Length: 3:37
- Label: Epic
- Songwriters: Skip Ewing, Mickey Cates
- Producers: James Stroud, Doug Stone

Doug Stone singles chronology
"More Love" (1994)	"Little Houses" (1994)	"Faith in Me, Faith in You" (1995)

"Little Houses" is a song written by Skip Ewing and Mickey Cates, and recorded by American country music artist Doug Stone. It was released in October 1994 as the first and only single from his Greatest Hits, Vol. 1 compilation album. The song reached number 7 on the Billboard Hot Country Singles & Tracks chart.

== Music video ==
The music video was directed by Marius Penczner and premiered in late 1994.

== Chart performance ==
Chart (1994–1995)	Peak position
Canada Country Singles (RPM)	20
US Hot Country Songs (Billboard)	7
