= T. H. Parry-Williams =

Welsh poet, author and academic

Y Prifardd Sir T. H. Parry-Williams
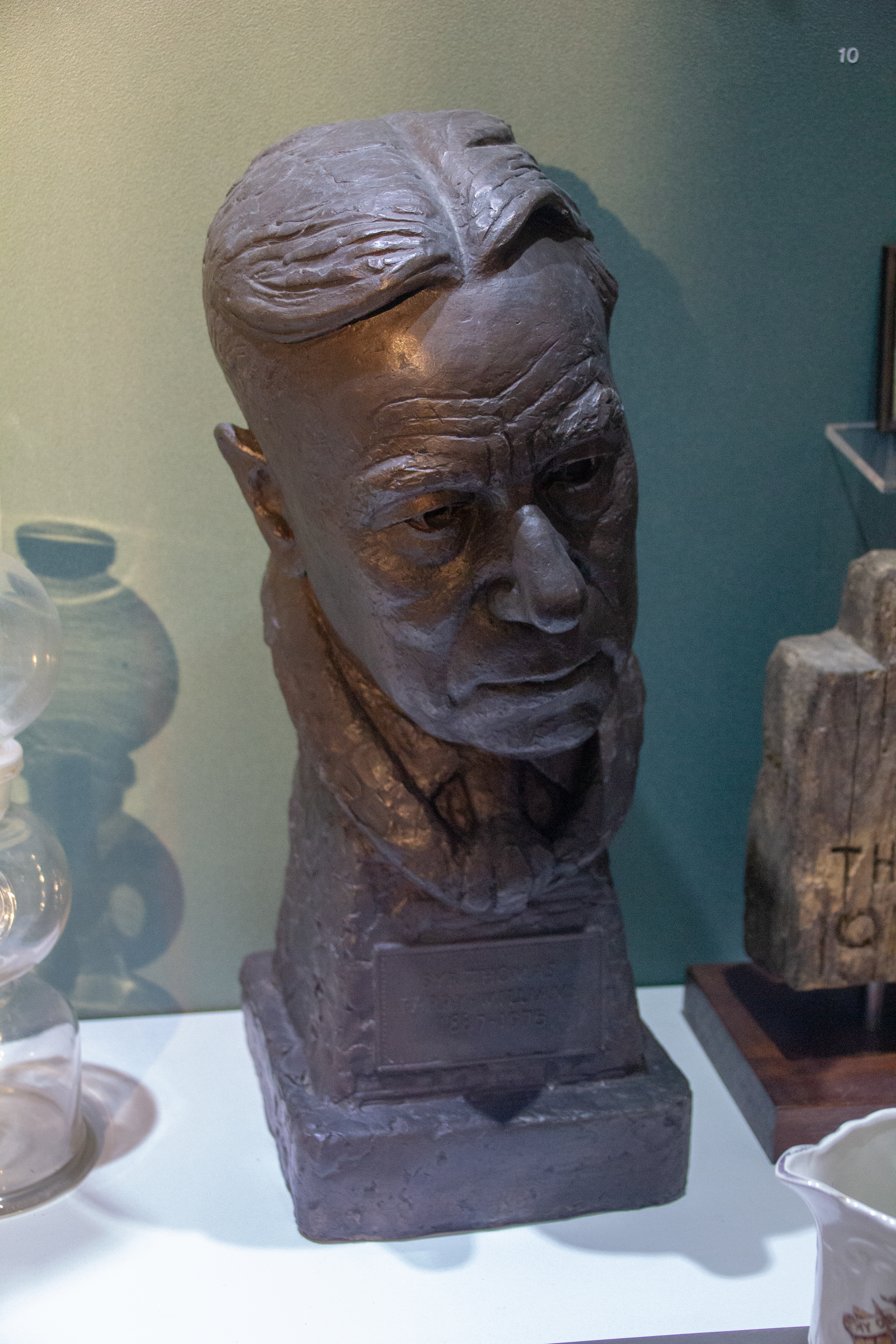
- Portrait bust (1966) by Robert Lambert Gapper
- Born: 21 September 1887; Tŷ'r Ysgol, Rhyd Ddu, Caernarfonshire, Wales
- Died: 3 March 1975 (aged 87); Wern, North Road, Aberystwyth, Dyfed, Wales
- Resting place: Beddgelert Cemetery, Beddgelert, Gwynedd, Wales
- Education: Ysgol Eifionydd, Porthmadog
- Alma mater: University College of Wales, Aberystwyth; Jesus College, Oxford; University of Freiburg; Sorbonne, University of Paris
- Occupations: Academic, author and poet
- Notable work: "Hon"
- Title: Emeritus Professor of Welsh Language and Literature
- Spouse: Emiah Jane Thomas (1910–1988)
- Parent(s): Henry Parry-Williams (1858–1925) and Ann Morris (b. 1859)
- Relatives: Robert Williams Parry (1884–1956) and Sir Thomas Parry (1904–1985) (1st cousins)
- Awards: National Eisteddfod Chair (1912 and 1915); National Eisteddfod Crown (1912 and 1915); D.Litt. (Wales) (1934); D.Litt. (Oxon.) (1937); Kt (1958)

Sir Thomas Herbert Parry-Williams (21 September 1887 – 3 March 1975) was a Welsh poet, author and academic. Parry-Williams was born at Tŷ'r Ysgol ('the Schoolhouse') in Rhyd Ddu, Caernarfonshire, Wales. He was educated at the University College of Wales, Aberystwyth, Jesus College, Oxford, the University of Freiburg and the Sorbonne in Paris. He was a conscientious objector during the First World War.

As a poet, he was the first to win the double of Chair (for an awdl, or long poem in strict metre) and Crown (for a free verse poem) at the National Eisteddfod of Wales, a feat which he first achieved at Wrexham in 1912 and repeated at Bangor in 1915. He was Professor of Welsh at the University of Wales, Aberystwyth, from 1920 until 1952. He co-founded the university's Centre for Advanced Welsh and Celtic Studies.

In 1931, while Parry-Williams was Professor of Welsh at the University of Wales, Aberystwyth, he published his own scholarly edition of the complete extant poems of Elizabethan era Welsh poet and Catholic martyr St. Richard Gwyn, along with original source material about his life in Middle Welsh, Elizabethan English, and Renaissance Latin. He was awarded D.Litt. degrees by the Universities of Wales (1934) and Oxford (1937). He was knighted in 1958. He was also given an honorary doctorate by the University of Wales in 1960 and made an Honorary Fellow of Jesus College, Oxford, in 1968.

== Published works ==
- The English element in Welsh (1923)
- Ysgrifau (1928)
- Cerddi (1931)
- Carolau Richard White (1931)
- Canu Rhydd Cynnar (1932)
- Olion (1935)
- Synfyfyrion (1937)
- Hen benillion (1940)
- Lloffion (1942)
- O'r pedwar gwynt (1944)
- Ugain o gerddi (1949)
- Myfyrdodau (1957)
- Pensynnu (1966)
- Detholiad o gerddi (1972)

== Bibliography ==
- Meic Stephens (ed.) Cydymaith i Lenyddiaeth Cymru Gwasg Prifysgol Cymru (1986) ISBN 9780708309155
  - 2nd edition, Gwasg Prifysgol Cymru (1997) ISBN 9780708313824
