= Ysgol Eifionydd =

School in Porthmadog, Wales

Coordinates: 52.932°N 4.131°W

Ysgol Eifionydd is a bilingual co-educational comprehensive school for 11-16 year-old pupils. It is situated in the town of Porthmadog, Gwynedd, Wales. The school serves the towns of Porthmadog, Cricieth and the rural villages of the area.

== Background ==
As of 2023, there were 362 pupils enrolled at the school. There were 487 pupils at the school in 2006, 534 in 2005 and 369 pupils on roll in 2015.

The school was established in 1894. One of its most famous ex-students was the poet and scholar T. H. Parry-Williams, who first attended the school aged 11 in 1898. Previously, it was a grammar school and was called Ysgol Ganolradd Porthmadog.

Rob Piercy, a successful local artist, was previously the art teacher at Ysgol Eifionydd.

The school's head master is Dewi Rhys Bowen.

In 2019, Ysgol Eifionydd will be celebrating 125 years of being a secondary school.

== Welsh language ==
The school is categorised linguistically by the Welsh Government as a category 2A school, meaning that at least 80 per cent of subjects apart from English and Welsh are taught only through the medium of Welsh to all pupils. However, one or two subjects are taught to some pupils in English or in both languages.

According to the latest Estyn inspection report conducted in 2018, 69% of pupils come from Welsh-speaking homes.

== Recent Head-teachers ==
- Dewi Bowen
- Alwen P. Watkin
- Richard Williams
- Gwilym R. Hughes
- Robert Wyn Jackson

== Notable former pupils ==
- T. H. Parry-Williams
- Sir Robert Armstrong-Jones
