= Make Up in Love (song) =

Single by Doug Stone

from the album Make Up in Love
- Released: April 24, 1999
- Genre: Country
- Length: 4:00
- Label: Atlantic
- Songwriters: Danny Orton, Tony Ramey
- Producers: Wally Wilson, Doug Stone

Doug Stone singles chronology
"Gone Out of My Mind" (1998)	"Make Up in Love" (1999)	"Take a Letter Maria" (1999)

"Make Up in Love" is a song written by Danny Orton and Tony Ramey, and recorded by American country music artist Doug Stone. It was released in April 1999 as the first single and title track from the album Make Up in Love. The song reached number 19 on the Billboard Hot Country Singles & Tracks chart.

== Content ==
"Make Up in Love" is a mid-tempo about two teenage lovers: a rebellious male named Danny Joe and a female named Bobbie. Danny Joe proposes to her and says that he can "make up in love" for whatever he does not have in material possessions.

== Critical reception ==
Susan Campbell of the Hartford Courant called it "a sweet ballad that Stone's very good at".

== Chart performance ==
Chart (1999)	Peak position
Canada Country Singles (RPM)	25
US Bubbling Under Hot 100 (Billboard)	5
US Hot Country Songs (Billboard)	19

=== Year-end charts ===
Chart (1999)	Position
US Country Songs (Billboard)	73
