= Ray Hood =

American country music singer-songwriter

- Born: Alabama
- Genres: Country
- Occupation: Singer-songwriter
- Instrument: Guitar
- Years active: 1994–present
- Labels: Caption/Curb

Ray Hood (born in Alabama) is an American country music singer-songwriter. Hood co-wrote Doug Stone's 1994 top five single "Addicted to a Dollar." Between 1996 and 2000, Hood charted two singles on the Billboard Hot Country Singles & Tracks chart. The highest-charting of the two, "Critical List," peaked at number 67 in 2000. It received a favorable review from Deborah Evans Price of Billboard, who wrote that "Hood has an impressive, barroom-seasoned baritone that works effectively on this uptempo number." The follow-up single, "What's a Little More Water," also received a positive review from Price, who said that "all the elements are here–a stunning traditional country vocal, clean and crisp production, and a killer hook."

His eponymous second album, released by Caption Records in October 2000, received a favorable review from Ray Waddell of Billboard, who wrote that "it's not often an artist comes along who can ease from heart-wrenching country ballads to gritty machismo so effortlessly and convincingly" and called the album "one of the most complete, solid country packages to come out of Nashville this year." The album received a negative review from Tom Netherland of Country Standard Time, who said that "despite a strong baritone and Nashville's leading session men backing his dozen tracks, Hood simply veers too from the country fold."

== Discography ==
=== Albums ===
Title	Album details
Back to Back Heartaches	Release date: July 31, 1995; Label: Caption Records
Ray Hood	Release date: October 24, 2000; Label: Caption Records

=== Singles ===
Year	Single	Peak positions	Album
Year	Single	US Country	Album
1995	"Teddy Bears in Oklahoma"	—	non-album song
1996	"Freedom"	73	Ray Hood
2000	"Critical List"	67	Ray Hood
2001	"What's a Little More Water"	—	Ray Hood
"—" denotes releases that did not chart

=== Music videos ===
Year	Video	Director
2000	"Critical List"	Tom Bevins
