= I Never Knew Love =

Single by Doug Stone

from the album More Love
- B-side: "This Empty House"
- Released: October 19, 1993
- Genre: Country
- Length: 3:32
- Label: Epic 77228
- Songwriters: Larry Boone, Will Robinson
- Producers: James Stroud, Doug Stone

Doug Stone singles chronology
"Why Didn't I Think of That" (1993)	"I Never Knew Love" (1993)	"Addicted to a Dollar" (1994)

"I Never Knew Love" is a song written by Larry Boone and Will Robinson, and recorded by American country music artist Doug Stone. It was released in October 1993 as the lead-off single from his fourth album More Love. It peaked at number 2 on the Billboard Hot Country Singles & Tracks chart and number 3 on the Canadian RPM Tracks chart. The song was also Stone's only entry on the Billboard Hot 100, where it peaked at number 81.

== Content ==
In this song, the narrator tells his lover about revelations in his life like that he didn't know the power of a song until his mother died, didn't know what innocence was until he saw a newborn baby, and didn't know what love was until he met her.

== Chart performance ==
Chart (1993–1994)	Peak position
Canada Country Singles (RPM)	3
US Billboard Hot 100	81
US Hot Country Songs (Billboard)	2

=== Year-end charts ===
Chart (1994)	Position
Canada Country Tracks (RPM)	64
