= Fourteen Minutes Old =

Single by Doug Stone

from the album Doug Stone
- B-side: "High Weeds and Rust"
- Released: June 28, 1990
- Genre: Country
- Length: 2:55
- Label: Epic (73425)
- Songwriters: A.L. "Doodle" Owens, Dennis Knutson
- Producer: Doug Johnson

Doug Stone singles chronology
| "I'd Be Better Off (In a Pine Box)" (1990) | "Fourteen Minutes Old" (1990) | "These Lips Don't Know How to Say Goodbye" (1990) |

"Fourteen Minutes Old" is a song written by A.L. "Doodle" Owens and Dennis Knutson, and recorded by American country music artist Doug Stone. It was released in June 1990 as the second single from his self titled debut album. It peaked at number 6 on the Billboard Hot Country Singles & Tracks chart and number 5 on The Canadian RPM Tracks chart.

== Content ==
The song's narrator is at home by himself, counting the minutes since his lover left: "There's still some coffee in her cup / And it's not even cold / And her memory's only 14 minutes old." This line changes to 15, then 16 minutes as the song progresses.

== Chart performance ==
| Chart (1990) | Peak position |
|---|---|
| Canada Country Singles (RPM) | 5 |
| US Hot Country Songs (Billboard) | 6 |

=== Year-end charts ===
| Chart (1990) | Position |
|---|---|
| Canada Country Tracks (RPM) | 51 |
| US Country Songs (Billboard) | 63 |
