= The First Christmas (album) =

Studio album by Doug Stone
- Released: September 15, 1992
- Genre: Country
- Length: 35:17
- Label: Epic
- Producer: Doug Johnson

Doug Stone chronology
From the Heart (1992)	The First Christmas (1992)	More Love (1993)

Professional ratings
Review scores
Source	Rating
Allmusic	link

The First Christmas is the fourth studio album released by American country music singer Doug Stone, released in September 1992. It was the first and only Christmas album of Stone's career. No singles were released from the album, although "Sailing Home for Christmas" was made into a music video.

== Track listing ==
1. "An Angel Like You" (Pam Belford) - 4:07
2. "The First Christmas" (Doug Stone, Phyllis Bennett, Lonnie Williams) - 4:07
3. "The Warmest Winter" (Bruce Burch) - 3:47
4. "All I Want for Christmas Is You" (Steve Dean) - 2:34
5. "When December Comes Around" (Randy Boudreaux, Stacey Slate) - 3:38
6. "Just Put a Ribbon in Your Hair" (Robert Burns, Donald C. Huber) - 3:18
7. "Santa's Flying a 747 Tonight" (Bennett, Williams) - 2:40
8. "Three Little Pennies" (Kim Tribble, Tim Bays) - 3:25
9. "Sailing Home for Christmas" (Lewis Anderson) - 3:59
10. "A Christmas Card" (Mike Dyche) - 3:51

== Personnel ==
- Bobby All - acoustic guitar
- Sonny Garrish - steel guitar
- Rob Hajacos - fiddle
- Owen Hale - drums
- Michael Jones - background vocals
- Blue Miller - electric guitar, background vocals
- Mark Morris - percussion
- Steve Nathan - keyboards
- Dave Pomeroy - bass guitar
- Brent Rowan - electric guitar
- Doug Stone - lead vocals

== Chart performance ==
Chart (1992)	Peak position
U.S. Billboard Top Country Albums	53
U.S. Billboard 200	186
