= These Lips Don't Know How to Say Goodbye =

Single by Doug Stone

from the album Doug Stone
- B-side: "We Always Agree on Love"
- Released: October 31, 1990
- Genre: Country
- Length: 3:31
- Label: Epic
- Songwriter: Harlan Howard
- Producer: Doug Johnson

Doug Stone singles chronology
"Fourteen Minutes Old" (1990)	"These Lips Don't Know How to Say Goodbye" (1990)	"In a Different Light" (1991)

"These Lips Don't Know How to Say Goodbye" is a song written by Harlan Howard and recorded by American country music singer first recorded by Johnny Bush on his 1973 album Whiskey River / There Stands the Glass. The Forester Sisters later recorded the song for their 1988 album Sincerely. It was later recorded by Doug Stone and released in October 1990 as the third single from the album Doug Stone. The song reached number 5 on the Billboard Hot Country Singles & Tracks chart.

== Music video ==
The music video was directed and produced by Deaton Flanigen and premiered in late 1990.

== Chart performance ==
Chart (1990–1991)	Peak position
Canada Country Singles (RPM)	2
US Hot Country Songs (Billboard)	5

=== Year-end charts ===
Chart (1991)	Position
Canada Country Tracks (RPM)	43
US Country Songs (Billboard)	50
