= Doug Stone =

American country music singer (born 1956)

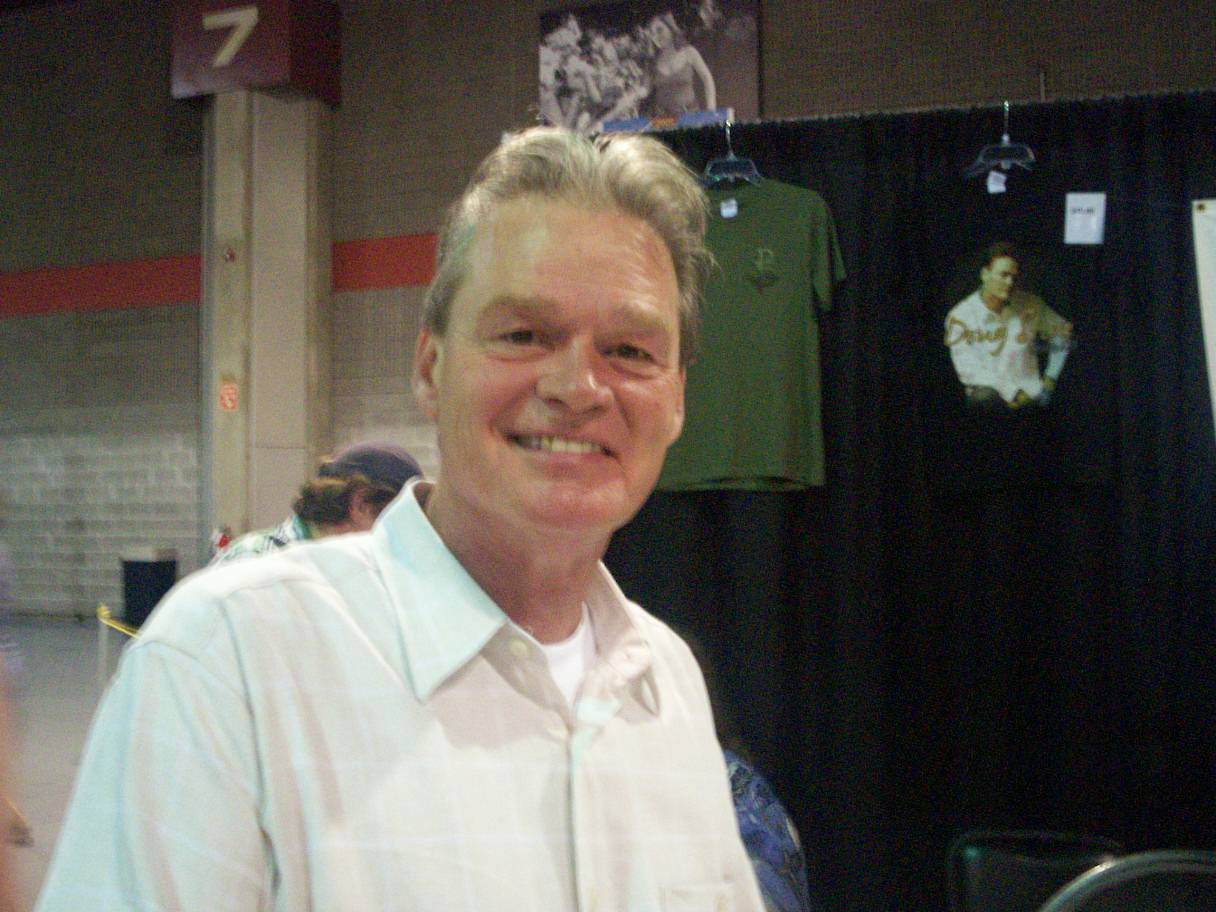
- Doug Stone at CMA Music Festival, June 2010

Background information
- Born: Douglas Jackson Brooks; June 19, 1956 (age 69); Marietta, Georgia, U.S.
- Origin: Nashville, Tennessee
- Genres: Country
- Occupations: Singer, songwriter
- Instrument: Vocals
- Years active: 1989–present
- Labels: Epic; Columbia; Atlantic; Koch/Audium; Lofton Creek
- Website: www.dougstone.com

Doug Stone (born Douglas Jackson Brooks; June 19, 1956) is an American country music singer and songwriter. He debuted in 1990 with the single "I'd Be Better Off (In a Pine Box)", the first release from his 1990 self-titled debut album for Epic Records. Both this album and its successor, 1991's I Thought It Was You, earned a platinum certification from the Recording Industry Association of America. Two more albums for Epic, 1992's From the Heart and 1994's More Love, are each certified gold. Stone moved to Columbia Records to record Faith in Me, Faith in You, which did not produce a Top Ten among its three singles. After suffering a heart attack and stroke in the late 1990s, he exited the label and did not release another album until Make Up in Love in 1999 on Atlantic Records. The Long Way was released in 2002 on the Audium label (now part of E1 Music), followed by two albums on the independent Lofton Creek Records.

Stone has charted twenty-six singles on Hot Country Songs, with his greatest chart success coming between 1990 and 1995. In this timespan, he had eight No. 1 singles on the Hot Country Songs charts including "In a Different Light", "A Jukebox with a Country Song", "Too Busy Being in Love", and "Why Didn't I Think of That". He is known for his neotraditionalist country sound and frequent recording of ballads.

== Early life ==
Stone was born as Douglas Jackson Brooks on June 19, 1956, in Marietta, Georgia. His mother, who was also a country music singer, taught him how to play guitar when he was 5. When he was 7, his mother placed him onstage to open for Loretta Lynn. His mother and father later divorced, and he moved to live with his father. He found additional work singing as a teenager: first at local skating rinks, and then at local bars, and later as one member of a short-lived trio; in addition, he and his father worked as mechanics to make ends meet. He also built a recording studio in his house, while performing in local clubs. By 1982, Stone was suffering from depression brought on by his musical career, when a friend introduced him to Carie Cohen, who would later become his second wife. He played various local venues, and was discovered by a record label manager while singing at a Veterans of Foreign Wars hall. The manager asked him for demos, which she then sent to Epic Records. He chose to record under the name Doug Stone, so as to avoid confusion with Garth Brooks. Record producer Doug Johnson played three tunes for Epic Records producer Bob Montgomery, who disliked the first two that he heard but enjoyed the third one. Through Montgomery's assistance, Stone signed with Epic in 1989, thus becoming the only artist that Montgomery ever signed without seeing perform live.

== Musical career ==
=== 1990–1991: Doug Stone ===
Stone's self-titled debut album was released in 1990 with Johnson as producer. Mac McAnally, Mark O'Connor, Paul Franklin, Brent Rowan, and Willie Weeks were among the session musicians on it. Contributing songwriters included David Lee Murphy, Larry Boone, Randy Boudreaux, A.L. "Doodle" Owens, Johnny MacRae, and Keith Palmer, who would later chart two singles for Epic in 1991. Its first single, "I'd Be Better Off (In a Pine Box)", spent twenty-five weeks on the Billboard Hot Country Songs charts and peaked at No. 4. In addition, the single was nominated for a Grammy Award for Best Country Song, and the album was certified platinum by the Recording Industry Association of America for U.S. shipments of one million copies. The album's next two singles were both Top Ten singles as well: "Fourteen Minutes Old" at No. 6 and "These Lips Don't Know How to Say Goodbye" at No. 5. Following these songs was "In a Different Light", co-written by Dickey Lee, which became Stone's first number 1 on Billboard. Stone received three music award nominations in 1991: the Horizon Award (now New Artist Award) from the Country Music Association, Star of Tomorrow from Music City News, and Top New Male Vocalist from the Academy of Country Music.

Brian Mansfield gave Doug Stone a four-and-a-half star rating out of five in his review for Allmusic. His review praised "I'd Be Better Off" in particular, calling the song a "towering expression of self-pity that most singers could spend a career trying to top," also saying that Stone "came close" to matching that song's quality in the album's ballads.

=== 1991-1992: I Thought It Was You, From the Heart, and The First Christmas ===
I Thought It Was You, his second album, was released in August 1991. Also certified platinum, it produced three more chart singles: the No. 4 title track, followed by the number 1 "A Jukebox with a Country Song" and "Come In Out of the Pain" at No. 3. "A Jukebox with a Country Song" spent two weeks at number 1, thus becoming his only multi-week number 1 single. Stone co-wrote the track "The Feeling Never Goes Away" with Kim Williams and Phyllis Bennett, and then-labelmate Joe Diffie co-wrote "Burning Down the Town". Alanna Nash of Entertainment Weekly gave the album an "A", saying that it contained "sex-and-smolder ballads" comparable to Conway Twitty. Mansfield was less favorable, saying that Stone "seems to wallow in sorrow".

In early 1992, Stone began experiencing dizziness and pain in one of his arms. He also began feeling chest pains which he initially thought were heartburn. After feeling disoriented at a concert in Oregon, he canceled an appearance at the Academy of Country Music telecast. He then underwent quadruple bypass surgery at Centennial Medical Center to alleviate four severe arterial blockages near his heart which had initially gone undiscovered by doctors. Following the surgery, Stone changed his diet and began exercising, in addition to touring in support of his third album, From the Heart, released that August. The album's title was seen by many music writers, including Irwin Stambler and Grelun Landon of Country Music: The Encyclopedia, as ironic in the wake of Stone's heart surgery.

With a gold certification for shipments of 500,000 copies, From the Heart produced two more number 1 singles in "Too Busy Being in Love" and "Why Didn't I Think of That". The other two singles were "Warning Labels" and "Made for Lovin' You", at No. 4 and No. 6 respectively. The latter had previously been recorded by both Dan Seals and Clinton Gregory. Mansfield thought that From the Heart was more consistent than Stone's previous two albums, saying that his "voice is at its pain-wracked best" on "Warning Labels" and that "The heart references take on a special meaning given the open-heart surgery that preceded this album". Nash criticized the album as "sappy, lightweight tales of infatuation and starry-eyed courtship". One month after From the Heart, Stone released a Christmas album titled The First Christmas. Although this album produced no singles, "Sailing Home for Christmas" was made into a music video. Stone was nominated in both 1992 and 1993 for Star of Tomorrow by Music City News, and Top Male Vocalist from the Academy of Country Music, winning the former award in 1993. He toured in 1992 with Patty Loveless, Lynyrd Skynyrd, and Hank Williams, Jr.

=== 1993-1995: More Love and Greatest Hits, Vol. 1 ===
His fourth album, More Love, was released in November 1993. Unlike his previous albums, Stone co-produced with James Stroud, except on the track "Dream High", which Stroud produced with Tom Bahler and Bruce Swedien. It also included different session musicians than his previous albums, such as guitarist Dann Huff and backing vocalist Curtis Wright. Its lead-off single was "I Never Knew Love", which spent two weeks at No. 2 on the country singles charts and accounted for his only entry on the Billboard Hot 100, where it peaked at No. 81. The album's next two singles were the No. 4 "Addicted to a Dollar" and the title track, which Stone wrote with Gary Burr, at No. 6. Tom Roland of New Country magazine criticized the album for "continu[ing] to mine the drippy side of Stone" through "manipulative" ballads, but cited "Addicted to a Dollar" and "Love, You Took Me by Surprise" as being "tougher" than Stone's previous works.

Starting in June 1994, Stone discovered that he was having breathing problems which were affecting his singing. He consulted throat doctors at Vanderbilt University's medical center, who failed to find any problems in his throat, while a second consultation revealed a lump in his left nostril. Upon its discovery, Stone feared that it might be cancer, and that it would put an end to his career. As a result, Stone quit smoking, although the lump was later discovered not to be cancerous and was successfully removed. While Stone was undergoing treatment, his Greatest Hits, Vol. 1 compilation was released in late 1994. Also receiving a gold certification, the album comprised nine of his previous hits and the new song "Little Houses", which debuted on the charts in October 1994 and peaked at No. 7 in early 1995. After its release, Stone made his acting debut in the 1995 film Gordy, in which he starred as Luke McAllister, a struggling musician. The movie's soundtrack featured four songs from More Love: "More Love", "That's a Lie", "Wishbone", and "Dream High", as well as two other songs that Stone performed: "The Heart I Broke" and "I Could Always Count on You".

=== 1995-1999: Faith in Me, Faith in You and Make Up in Love ===
Also in 1995, parent company Sony Music Entertainment chose to move Stone from the Nashville division of Epic Records to that of Columbia Records. This decision was made to give Stone a new promotional team. His only Columbia album, Faith in Me, Faith in You, was released in March of that year, with Stroud again serving as co-producer. This album's three singles were comparatively less successful than his previous singles, with none reaching Top 10: the title track peaked at No. 13, followed by "Sometimes I Forget" at No. 41 (his first single to miss the Top 40) and "Born in the Dark" at No. 12. Stone suffered a nearly-fatal heart attack in December 1995 and a mild stroke in 1996, reducing his ability to record and tour. Stone would later remark that he was "lucky" to have survived his health issues in this timespan. One of his few performances in this timespan was at a show in Dollywood, a theme park owned by Dolly Parton, in mid-1996. His last charting single for Columbia was "Gone Out of My Mind", which he recorded for the multi-artist compilation album A Tribute to Tradition in 1998.

Stone signed with Atlantic Records and released Make Up in Love in 1999 under the production of Wally Wilson. A more pop-oriented album than his previous ones, the album produced a minor Top 20 hit in its title track. Its next singles were a cover of R.B. Greaves's 1969 single "Take a Letter Maria", which Stone took to number 45, and "Surprise", which spent only one week on the country charts, at number 64. Also included on the album were a duet with Leslie Satcher titled "The Heart Holds On", and the Bobby Braddock-penned "The Difference Between a Woman and a Man", which was later recorded by Josh Turner on his 2003 debut album Long Black Train. Stephen Thomas Erlewine gave the album a mixed review, saying that "Since Stone's voice is pleasant, the music is often pleasant, but it's hardly memorable." Andy Turner of Country Standard Time was more favorable, saying that it "does not come off 'too country for country' yet is still engaging largely because of Stone's voice — soft with built-in teardrops." Also in 1999, Stone and Skip Ewing co-wrote "In the Name of Love" on the only album released by female country duo Redmon & Vale.

=== 2000-present: The Long Way, In a Different Light, and My Turn ===
In December 1999, Stone was aboard an airplane which skidded off a snowy runway at O'Hare Airport in Chicago; there were no injuries. Stone began piloting ultra-light airplanes as a hobby in 1999 and 2000. In March 2000, he suffered a broken left ankle, cracked rib, concussion, and bruised kidney after crashing his plane in Robertson County, Tennessee, and was briefly hospitalized before he resumed touring. Stone later said that the accident made him decide to quit flying planes. After the September 11, 2001 attacks, rumors circulated that Stone had been on one of the hijacked planes; a spokeswoman for the singer confirmed that he was at home with his family that day.

Stone signed to Audium Entertainment in 2002 and recorded The Long Way. This album included seven new songs and acoustic re-recordings of "More Love", "Born in the Dark", and "I'd Be Better Off". One of the original songs on it was "POW 369", which was later recorded by Darryl Worley. Stewart Mason thought that it was "not nearly as suffocatingly slick" as Stone's previous albums, but questioned its commercial success. His next album did not come out until 2005, when he signed to the independent label Lofton Creek Records, recording the album In a Different Light. The album included a cover of "Georgia on My Mind", which was the first single, and re-recordings of "In a Different Light" and "Why Didn't I Think of That". A second album for Lofton Creek, My Turn, followed in 2007. It was led off by the single "Nice Problem". William Ruhlmann praised this album for having "a timeless country feel", also saying that "Stone sings with as much fervor and sincerity as ever." Ken Tucker of Billboard wrote that "He sounds as good as ever and his music is still relevant".

In 2013, Stone toured with Bryan White and Shenandoah as part of the "Reliving the 90s Tour". He also returned to acting, with roles in the films When the Storm God Rides and The Story of Bonnie and Clyde.

== Personal life ==
Stone married his second wife, Carie Cohen, in 1982. The couple separated in July 1994, and Cohen filed for divorce two months later, accusing Stone of alcohol abuse and infidelity. He married Beth Snyder in December 1996 after being engaged to her for a year. As of 2005, he had one daughter with Beth, and four children from his previous marriages. Stone split from Snyder in late 2006 and returned to his Georgia home.

On March 29, 2015, Stone married fiddler Jade Jack in Greenville, Texas, and both have a daughter together, born April 14, 2016.

== Musical styles ==
Stone is known primarily for his neotraditionalist country sound, his tenor singing voice, and emphasis on ballads. In Country Music: A Biographical Dictionary, Richard Carlin describes him as "a solid country crooner whose style is reminiscent of Merle Haggard." Steve Huey of Allmusic wrote that Stone "made his name as a lonesome baritone balladeer, though he's also adept at hard uptempo country." Zell Miller, author of They Heard Georgia Singing, wrote that Stone has "established himself as a mellow country crooner who is known as 'Mr. Sensitive'" and "the Dean Martin of country music because of his unique flair for communicating the fragility of a broken heart with his delicate baritone voice and laid-back style." Kurt Wolff of Country Music: The Rough Guide described Stone's musical style less favorably. He wrote that Stone seemed "schizophrenic. Half his reputation was established with self-deprecating downers like 'I'd Be Better Off (In a Pine Box)', but then he'd just as easily turn around with a schmaltzy love song like 'Too Busy Being in Love'." He compared "I'd Be Better Off" and "Warning Labels" favorably to Haggard as well, and thought that the change of producers on More Love gave him a "much beefier sound". Writing for New Country magazine, Jim Ridley thought that outside "I'd Be Better Off", Stone "has floundered in search of a worthy follow-up...recording albums of syrupy dreck in an attempt to carve a niche as a balladeer." Ridley also thought that Faith in Me, Faith in You strengthened Stone's musical image by including more up-tempo tracks than its predecessors.

== Discography ==
Albums

- Doug Stone (1990)
- I Thought It Was You (1991)
- From the Heart (1992)
- The First Christmas (1992)
- More Love (1993)
- Greatest Hits, Vol. 1 (1994)
- Faith in Me, Faith in You (1995)
- Make Up in Love (1999)
- The Long Way (2002)
- In a Different Light (2005)
- My Turn (2007)

=== Billboard number-one hits ===
- "In a Different Light" (1 week, 1991)
- "A Jukebox With a Country Song" (2 weeks, 1991-1992)
- "Too Busy Being in Love" (1 week, 1992-1993)
- "Why Didn't I Think of That" (1 week, 1993)

== Filmography ==
=== Film ===
Year	Title	Role	Notes
1995	Gordy	Luke MacAllister	

== Awards and nominations ==
=== Grammy Awards ===
Year	Nominee / work	Award	Result
1991	"I'd Be Better Off (In a Pine Box)"	Best Male Country Vocal Performance	Nominated

=== TNN/Music City News Country Awards ===
Year	Nominee / work	Award	Result
1991	Doug Stone	Star of Tomorrow	Nominated
1992	Doug Stone	Star of Tomorrow	Nominated
1993	Doug Stone	Star of Tomorrow	Won

=== Academy of Country Music Awards ===
Year	Nominee / work	Award	Result
1991	Doug Stone	Top New Male Vocalist	Nominated
1992	Doug Stone	Top Male Vocalist of the Year	Nominated
1993	Doug Stone	Top Male Vocalist of the Year	Nominated

=== Country Music Association Awards ===
Year	Nominee / work	Award	Result
1991	Doug Stone	Horizon Award	Nominated
