= I Thought It Was You =

Studio album by Doug Stone
- Released: August 13, 1991
- Recorded: 1991
- Studio: Nightingale Recording Studio, Nashville, TN
- Genre: Country
- Length: 34:12
- Label: Epic
- Producer: Doug Johnson

Doug Stone chronology
| Doug Stone (1990) | I Thought It Was You (1991) | From the Heart (1992) |

Singles from I Thought It Was You
- 1. "I Thought It Was You" Released: July 8, 1991; 2. "A Jukebox with a Country Song" Released: November 1991; 3. "Come In Out of the Pain" Released: March 21, 1992

Professional ratings
Review scores
| Source | Rating |
|---|---|
| Allmusic | link |
| Entertainment Weekly | A link |

I Thought It Was You is the second studio album by American country music singer Doug Stone, released in 1991. Certified platinum in the United States, this album produced Top Five singles on the Hot Country Songs charts in its title track and "Come in out of the Pain", as well as a Number One in "A Jukebox with a Country Song".

== Track listing ==
| No. | Title | Writer(s) | Length |
|---|---|---|---|
| 1. | "I Thought It Was You" | Tim Mensy, Gary Harrison | 3:28 |
| 2. | "A Jukebox with a Country Song" | Ronnie Samoset, Gene Nelson | 3:29 |
| 3. | "The Feeling Never Goes Away" | Doug Stone, Kim Williams, Phyllis Bennett | 4:04 |
| 4. | "(For Every Inch I've Laughed) I've Cried a Mile" | Tompall Glaser, Harlan Howard | 3:27 |
| 5. | "Remember the Ride" | Mike Harrell, Williams | 3:22 |
| 6. | "Come In Out of the Pain" | Frank J. Myers, Don Pfrimmer | 3:50 |
| 7. | "Burning Down the Town" | Joe Diffie, Wayne Perry | 2:56 |
| 8. | "If It Was Up to Me" | Johnny MacRae, Steve Clark | 3:05 |
| 9. | "The Right to Remain Silent" | Williams | 3:02 |
| 10. | "They Don't Make Years Like They Used To" | Freddy Weller | 3:29 |

== Personnel ==
=== Musicians ===
- Bobby All - acoustic guitar
- Paul Franklin - steel guitar, dobro
- Rob Hajacos - fiddle
- Owen Hale - drums
- Kirk "Jelly Roll" Johnson - harmonica
- Michael Jones - background vocals
- Tim Mensy - acoustic guitar on "I Thought It Was You"
- Mark Morris - percussion
- Steve Nathan - keyboards
- Brent Rowan - electric guitar
- Doug Stone - acoustic guitar, lead vocals, background vocals
- Willie Weeks - bass guitar

=== Production ===
- Mary Beth Felts - make-up
- Paris Gordon - stylist
- Larry Hudson - hair
- Bill Johnson - art direction
- Doug Johnson - musical arrangements
- David Parker - assistant engineer
- Randee St. Nicholas - photography
- Rollow Welch - design
  - Mastered by Denny Purcell at Georgetown Masters

== Charts ==
=== Weekly charts ===
| Chart (1991) | Peak position |
|---|---|
| US Billboard 200 | 74 |
| US Top Country Albums (Billboard) | 12 |

=== Year-end charts ===
| Chart (1991) | Position |
|---|---|
| US Top Country Albums (Billboard) | 68 |
| Chart (1992) | Position |
| US Top Country Albums (Billboard) | 32 |

== Certifications ==
| Region | Certification | Certified units/sales |
|---|---|---|
| United States (RIAA) | Platinum | 1,000,000^{^} |
^{^} Shipments figures based on certification alone.
