= My Turn (Doug Stone album) =

Studio album by Doug Stone
- Released: September 18, 2007
- Genre: Country
- Label: Lofton Creek
- Producer: Doug Stone

Doug Stone chronology
| In a Different Light (2005) | My Turn (2007) | Live at Billy Bob's Texas (2009) |

Professional ratings
Review scores
| Source | Rating |
|---|---|
| Allmusic | 3.5/5 stars |

My Turn is the eleventh studio album released by American country music artist Doug Stone. It is also his second album for Lofton Creek Records. The album produced the singles "Nice Problem" and "She Always Get What She Wants", neither of which charted on the Billboard country charts. The third single, "Don't Tell Mama", was previously recorded by Ty Herndon on his 1996 album Living in a Moment and Gary Allan on his 1999 album Smoke Rings in the Dark.

== Track listing ==
1. "We're All About That" (Terry Clayton, Jeff Jones, Rusty VanSickle) – 3:28
2. "Dancin' on Glass" (Charles Jeryl Robinson, Jeff Lysyczyn) – 3:47
3. "Ain't That Just Like a Woman" (Clayton, Jones, VanSickle) – 3:47
4. "Don't Tell Mama" (William Brock, Jerry Laseter, Kim Williams) – 3:49
5. "Nice Problem" (Williams, Tim Johnson) – 3:11
6. "The Right Side of Lonesome" (Doug Stone) – 3:40
7. "The Hard Way" (Clayton, Jones, VanSickle) – 3:49
8. "She Always Gets What She Wants" (Clayton, Jones, VanSickle) – 3:21
9. "That's How We Roll" (Clayton, Jones, VanSickle) – 3:15
10. "To a Better Place" (Lysyczyn) – 4:22
11. "You Were Never Mine to Lose" (Stone, Williams, Ron Harbin) – 3:50

== Personnel ==
- Jim "Moose" Brown - keyboards
- Dan Dugmore - steel guitar
- Rob Hajacos - fiddle
- Owen Hale - drums
- Wes Hightower - background vocals
- Mark Hill - bass guitar
- Julian King - percussion
- B. James Lowry - acoustic guitar
- Brent Rowan - banjo, electric guitar
- Doug Stone - lead vocals
