= Faith in Me, Faith in You (song) =

Single by Doug Stone

from the album Faith in Me, Faith in You
- B-side: "Enough About Me (Let's Talk About You)"
- Released: February 1995
- Genre: Country
- Length: 3:24
- Label: Columbia
- Songwriters: Trey Bruce; Dave Loggins
- Producers: Doug Stone; James Stroud

Doug Stone singles chronology
"Little Houses" (1994)	"Faith in Me, Faith in You" (1995)	"Sometimes I Forget" (1995)

"Faith in Me, Faith in You" is a song written by Trey Bruce and Dave Loggins, and recorded by American country music artist Doug Stone. It was released in February 1995 as the first single from his album of the same name, and reached No. 13 on the Billboard Hot Country Singles & Tracks chart in May 1995.

== Music video ==
The music video was directed by Deaton-Flanigen Productions and premiered in early 1995.

== Chart performance ==
Chart (1995)	Peak position
Canada Country Singles (RPM)	20
US Hot Country Songs (Billboard)	13
