= Born in the Dark =

Single by Doug Stone

from the album Faith in Me, Faith in You
- B-side: "Down on My Knees"
- Released: September 1995
- Genre: Country
- Length: 2:22
- Label: Columbia
- Songwriter: Chet Hinesley
- Producers: Doug Stone; James Stroud

Doug Stone singles chronology
"Sometimes I Forget" (1995)	"Born in the Dark" (1995)	"Gone Out of My Mind" (1998)

"Born in the Dark" is a song written by Chet Hinesley, and recorded by American country music artist Doug Stone. It was released in September 1995 as the third single from his album Faith in Me, Faith in You. The song reached number 12 on the Billboard Hot Country Singles & Tracks chart in January 1996.

== Chart performance ==
Chart (1995–1996)	Peak position
Canada Country Singles (RPM)	14
US Hot Country Songs (Billboard)	12
