= Too Busy Being in Love =

Single by Doug Stone

from the album From the Heart
- B-side: "The Workin' End of a Hoe"
- Released: October 26, 1992
- Genre: Country
- Length: 3:54
- Label: Epic 74761
- Songwriters: Gary Burr, Victoria Shaw
- Producer: Doug Johnson

Doug Stone singles chronology
"Warning Labels" (1992)	"Too Busy Being in Love" (1992)	"Made for Lovin' You" (1993)

"Too Busy Being in Love" is a song written by Victoria Shaw and Gary Burr, and recorded by American country music singer Doug Stone. It was released in October 1992 as the second single from the album From the Heart. The song reached the top of the Billboard Hot Country Singles & Tracks chart and on The Canadian RPM Tracks chart.

== Content ==
In this song, the narrator says his lover inspires him so poetically that he could have been a great writer, but that he was "Too Busy Being in Love" with her to do so.

== Music video ==
The music video was directed by Michael Merriman and premiered in late 1992.

== Chart performance ==
Chart (1992–1993)	Peak position
Canada Country Singles (RPM)	1
US Hot Country Songs (Billboard)	1

=== Year-end charts ===
Chart (1993)	Position
Canada Country Tracks (RPM)	22
US Country Songs (Billboard)	48
