= Come In Out of the Pain =

Single by Doug Stone

from the album I Thought It Was You
- B-side: "The Feeling Never Goes Away"
- Released: March 21, 1992
- Genre: Country
- Length: 3:51
- Label: Epic 74259
- Songwriters: Don Pfrimmer, Frank J. Myers
- Producer: Doug Johnson

Doug Stone singles chronology
"A Jukebox with a Country Song" (1992)	"Come In Out of the Pain" (1992)	"Warning Labels" (1992)

"Come In Out of the Pain" is a song written by Don Pfrimmer and Frank J. Myers, and recorded by American country music singer Doug Stone. It was released in March 1992 as the third and final single from his album I Thought It Was You. It peaked at number 3 on both the Billboard Hot Country Singles & Tracks chart and the Canadian RPM Tracks chart.

== Chart performance ==
Chart (1992)	Peak position
Canada Country Singles (RPM)	3
US Hot Country Songs (Billboard)	3

=== Year-end charts ===
Chart (1992)	Position
Canada Country Tracks (RPM)	57
US Country Songs (Billboard)	48
