= Warning Labels =

Single by Doug Stone

from the album From the Heart
- B-side: "Left, Leavin', Goin' or Gone"
- Released: June 29, 1992
- Genre: Country
- Length: 2:58
- Label: Epic
- Songwriters: Kim Williams, Oscar Turman
- Producer: Doug Johnson

Doug Stone singles chronology
| "Come In Out of the Pain" (1992) | "Warning Labels" (1992) | "Too Busy Being in Love" (1992) |

"Warning Labels" is a song written by Kim Williams and Oscar Turman, and recorded by American country music artist Doug Stone. It was released in June 1992 as the lead single from the album From the Heart. The song reached number 4 on the Billboard Hot Country Singles & Tracks chart.

== Content ==
The song is a mid-tempo where the male narrator, feeling the loss of his lover, listens to music by Merle Haggard and George Jones. As the songs remind him of his own loss, he states that "they oughta put warning labels on those sad country songs".

== Music video ==
The music video was directed by Wayne Miller and premiered in mid-1992.

== Chart performance ==
"Warning Labels" debuted at number 48 on the U.S. Billboard Hot Country Singles & Tracks for the week of July 11, 1992.

| Chart (1992) | Peak position |
|---|---|
| Canada Country Singles (RPM) | 6 |
| US Hot Country Songs (Billboard) | 4 |

=== Year-end charts ===
| Chart (1992) | Position |
|---|---|
| Canada Country Tracks (RPM) | 91 |
| US Country Songs (Billboard) | 21 |
