= A Jukebox with a Country Song =

Single by Doug Stone

from the album I Thought It Was You
- B-side: "Remember the Ride"
- Released: November 1991
- Genre: Country
- Length: 3:29
- Label: Epic 74089
- Songwriters: Gene Nelson; Ronnie Samoset
- Producer: Doug Johnson

Doug Stone singles chronology
"I Thought It Was You" (1991)	"A Jukebox with a Country Song" (1991)	"Come In Out of the Pain" (1992)

"A Jukebox With a Country Song'" is a song written by Gene Nelson and Ronnie Samoset, and recorded by American country music artist Doug Stone. It was released in November 1991 as the second single from his album I Thought It Was You. It became his second song to reach #1 on the country chart in both the United States and Canada. The B-side, "Remember the Ride", was later recorded by Perfect Stranger on their 1995 album You Have the Right to Remain Silent.

== Content ==
In this song, after having an argument with his wife, the narrator goes to have a drink at his old haunt only to find that it has been turned into a high-class fern bar. In utter disbelief for the rest of the song, he is eventually dragged out of the bar, asking what happened to it.

== Music video ==
The music video was directed by Peter Lippman.

== Chart performance ==
Chart (1991–1992)	Peak position
Canada Country Singles (RPM)	1
US Hot Country Songs (Billboard)	1

=== Year-end charts ===
Chart (1992)	Position
Canada Country Tracks (RPM)	26
US Country Songs (Billboard)	14
