= I Thought It Was You (song) =

Single by Doug Stone

from the album I Thought It Was You
- B-side: "(For Every Inch I've Laughed) I've Cried a Mile"
- Released: July 8, 1991
- Genre: Country
- Length: 3:27
- Label: Epic 73895
- Songwriters: Gary Harrison; Tim Mensy
- Producer: Doug Johnson

Doug Stone singles chronology
"In a Different Light" (1991)	"I Thought It Was You" (1991)	"A Jukebox with a Country Song" (1991)

"I Thought It Was You" is a song written by Tim Mensy and Gary Harrison, and recorded by American country music singer Doug Stone. It was released in July 1991 as the first single and title track from his album of the same name. It was a number 4 country hit for him in the United States, and a number 1 in Canada.

== Content ==
"I Thought It Was You" is a mid-tempo ballad in which the male narrator mistakes other people that he sees for his former lover. Each time, he says, "I thought it was you" of the mistaken identity. He elaborates on this line in the chorus with the line "I hear there's one special love in each life, and I must look like a fool / I thought it was you."

== Chart positions ==
Chart (1991)	Peak position
Canada Country Singles (RPM)	1
US Hot Country Songs (Billboard)	4

=== Year-end charts ===
Chart (1991)	Position
Canada Country Tracks (RPM)	29
US Country Songs (Billboard)	43
