= Robert Armstrong-Jones =

Welsh physician

Sir Robert Armstrong-Jones CBE JP DL FRCS FRCP FSA
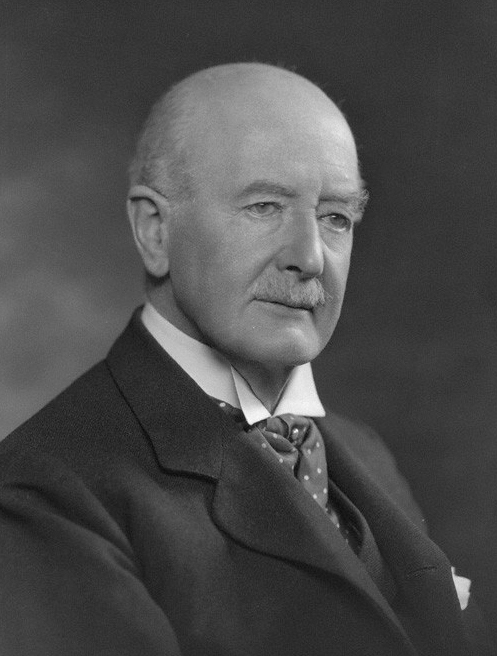
- Robert Armstrong-Jones in 1933
- Born: Robert Jones; 2 December 1857; Ynyscynhaearn, Caernarvonshire, Wales
- Died: 30 January 1943 (aged 85); Plas Dinas, Caernarvonshire, Wales
- Education: University of Wales, Bangor
- Occupations: Physician, psychiatrist
- Spouse: Margaret Roberts (m. 1893)
- Children: Elaine Wauchope; Ronald Armstrong-Jones; Gwendolen Buckley
- Relatives: Antony Armstrong-Jones, 1st Earl of Snowdon (grandson)

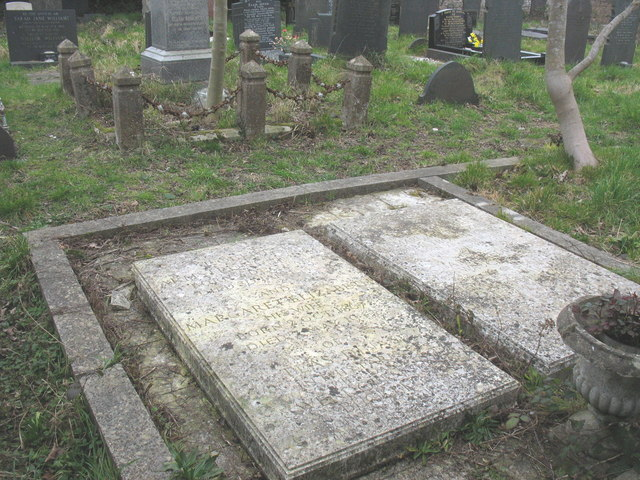
The grave of Robert Armstrong-Jones and his wife Margaret is on the left. On the right is Ronald Armstrong-Jones's grave.

Sir Robert Armstrong-Jones, CBE JP DL FRCS FRCP FSA (born Robert Jones; 2 December 1857 – 30 January 1943) was a Welsh physician and psychiatrist.

== Biography ==
He was born in Ynyscynhaearn, Caernarvonshire, the son of Thomas Jones, a Congregational minister and small landed proprietor at Eisteddfa, Criccieth, and Elizabeth, daughter of Robert Jones, of Eisteddfa. He was educated at Porthmadog Grammar School and Grove Park School, Wrexham, going on to study medicine at University of Wales, Bangor, and St. Bartholomew's Hospital. Becoming a specialist in the treatment of mental illness, he worked as a junior medical officer at the Royal Earlswood Institution and Colney Hatch during the 1880s, and became resident physician and superintendent of Earlswood Asylum in 1888. In 1893 he became the first superintendent of the London County Council's Claybury Asylum, where he developed new treatments. In the same year he married Margaret Roberts (1868–1943), one of the first 12 students at Somerville Hall (later Somerville College) in Oxford and the elder daughter of Sir Owen Roberts of Plas Dinas, Caernarfon.

Jones lectured at St Bartholomew's Hospital, and became consulting physician in mental diseases to the military forces at London and Aldershot. In 1913, he assumed the additional surname of Armstrong, which had been the maiden name of his wife's grandmother, Jane née Armstrong, because he wanted to distinguish himself from another prominent Robert Jones of the time. During World War I, he was designated a Lieutenant-Colonel in the Royal Army Medical Corps; he was knighted in the 1917 New Year Honours, and after the war he was appointed a Commander of the Order of the British Empire (CBE) in recognition of his war service. He was appointed High Sheriff of Caernarvonshire for 1929. He was a Fellow of both the Royal College of Physicians and the Royal College of Surgeons.

Armstrong-Jones had one son, Ronald Armstrong-Jones, and two daughters, Elaine Margaret Wauchope (1895–1965) and Gwendolen Jane Buckley (1905–1985), who married Sir Denys Buckley.

Armstrong-Jones died in Plas Dinas at the age of 85. His wife survived him by only four months. Their daughter Elaine married Colonel Charles Wauchup. Armstrong-Jones's son, Ronald, became a barrister, married Anne Messel (firstly) and was the father of Antony Armstrong-Jones, 1st Earl of Snowdon, the brother-in-law of Queen Elizabeth II.

== See also ==
- List of Welsh medical pioneers
