= Faith in Me, Faith in You =

Studio album by Doug Stone
- Released: March 28, 1995
- Recorded: 1994
- Studio: Loud Recording, Sound Stage Studios Nashville, TN
- Genre: Country
- Length: 30:55
- Label: Columbia
- Producer: Doug Stone, James Stroud

Doug Stone chronology
Greatest Hits, Vol. 1 (1994)	Faith in Me, Faith in You (1995)	Make Up in Love (1999)

Singles from Faith in Me, Faith in You
- 1. "Faith in Me, Faith in You" Released: February 1995; 2. "Sometimes I Forget" Released: June 1995; 3. "Born in the Dark" Released: September 1995

Faith in Me, Faith in You is the seventh studio album by American country music artist Doug Stone. It was his only album for Columbia Records after leaving Epic Records' roster in 1995. Although this album produced three singles — "Sometimes I Forget", the title track, and "Born in the Dark" — none of these singles reached Top Ten on the country music charts. "Sometimes I Forget" peaked at number 41, becoming the first single of his career to miss Top 40 entirely.

== History and content ==
Following this album, he suffered a series of health problems which would place his career on hiatus until he signed to Atlantic Records in 1999.

The track "Honky Tonk Mona Lisa" was originally recorded by Marcus Hummon on his 1995 album All in Good Time, from which it was released as a single that year. The same song would later be recorded by Neal McCoy on his 2003 album The Luckiest Man in the World. "Look Where She Is Today" was later recorded by Mark Wills on his 1996 self-titled debut.

== Critical reception ==
Richard McVay of Cash Box magazine reviewed the album with favor, praising the mix of upbeat songs and ballads along with Stone's voice, concluding that "Stone has once again incorporated his unique style, vocal charisma, and musical enthusiasm onto an animated 10-cut album."

== Track listing ==
No.	Title	Writer(s)	Length
1.	"You Won't Outlive Me"	Doug Stone, Randy Boudreaux, Ray Dahrouge	2:44
2.	"Faith in Me, Faith in You"	Trey Bruce, Dave Loggins	3:24
3.	"Sometimes I Forget"	Bob Regan, Billy Kirsch	3:32
4.	"Born in the Dark"	Chet Hinesley	2:22
5.	"Down on My Knees"	Stone, Hinesley	3:44
6.	"Enough About Me (Let's Talk About You)"	Bill LaBounty, Rand Bishop	2:58
7.	"I Do All My Crying (On the Inside)"	Boudreaux, Stan Paul Davis, Kim Williams	3:27
8.	"Honky Tonk Mona Lisa"	Marcus Hummon, Darrell Scott	3:03
9.	"You're Not That Easy to Forget"	Stone	3:05
10.	"Look Where She Is Today"	Billy Spencer, Ed Hill	2:36

== Personnel ==
As listed in the liner notes.

Musicians

- Eddie Bayers - drums (2, 6, 9, 10)
- Mike Brignardello - bass guitar (1, 3, 4, 5, 7, 8)
- Larry Byrom - acoustic guitar (1, 3, 4, 5, 7)
- Stuart Duncan - fiddle (2, 6, 9, 10), mandolin (2)
- Kim Fleming - background vocals (2)
- Paul Franklin - steel guitar (2, 6, 9, 10), Dobro (2)
- Sonny Garrish - steel guitar (1, 3, 4, 5, 7, 8)
- Vicki Hampton - background vocals (2)
- Dann Huff - electric guitar (all tracks)
- Mark Ivey - background vocals (4, 6, 8, 9, 10)
- Donna McElroy - background vocals (2)
- Terry McMillan - harmonica (1), percussion (4, 5, 8)
- Michael Mellet - background vocals (2)
- Nashville String Machine - strings (3)
- Matt Rollings - piano (all tracks)
- Joe Spivey - fiddle (1, 4, 5, 7, 8)
- James Stroud - drums (8)
- Carlos Vega - drums (1, 3, 4, 5, 7)
- Biff Watson - acoustic guitar (2, 6, 8, 9, 10)
- Chris Willis - background vocals (2)
- Dennis Wilson - background vocals (1, 2, 3, 5, 7)
- Glenn Worf - bass guitar (2, 6, 9, 10)
- Curtis Young - background vocals (all tracks)

Technical

- Ricky Cobble - recording assistant
- Steve Dorff - string arrangement (3), conductor (3)
- Mark Hagen - recording assistant
- Julian King - recording, mixing
- Lynn Peterzell - recording, mixing, mastering
- Doug Rich - production assistant
- Doug Stone - producer
- James Stroud - producer
- Craig White - mixing assistant

== Chart performance ==
Chart (1995)	Peak position
US Top Country Albums (Billboard)	45
