= Why Didn't I Think of That =

Single by Doug Stone

from the album From the Heart
- B-side: "This Empty House"
- Released: June 15, 1993
- Genre: Country
- Length: 3:11
- Label: Epic
- Songwriters: Paul Harrison, Bob McDill
- Producer: Doug Johnson

Doug Stone singles chronology
"Made for Lovin' You" (1993)	"Why Didn't I Think of That" (1993)	"I Never Knew Love" (1993)

"Why Didn't I Think of That" is a song written by Bob McDill and Paul Harrison, and recorded by American country music singer Doug Stone. The song reached the top of the Billboard Hot Country Singles & Tracks chart. It was released in June 1993 as the fourth and final single from his album From the Heart. It is also the last number one hit that Stone had in the United States, while he would have one more number one in Canada with "Addicted to a Dollar". This song was originally recorded by the Marshall Tucker Band in 1988 on their Still Holdin' On album.

== Content ==
The song's narrator is a man who did not treat his lady right, so he watches another man treat his lady right.

== Chart positions ==
Chart (1993)	Peak position
Canada Country Singles (RPM)	6
US Hot Country Songs (Billboard)	1

=== Year-end charts ===
Chart (1993)	Position
US Country Songs (Billboard)	10
