= More Love (album) =

Studio album by Doug Stone
- Released: November 16, 1993
- Studios: 16th Avenue Sound, Loud Recording Studio, Mesa Recording Studio, and Woodland Digital Studios, Nashville, TN
- Genre: Country
- Length: 33:06
- Label: Epic
- Producers: Tom Bahler; Doug Stone; James Stroud; Bruce Swedien

Doug Stone chronology
The First Christmas (1992)	More Love (1993)	Greatest Hits, Vol. 1 (1994)

Singles from From the Heart
- 1. "I Never Knew Love" Released: October 19, 1993; 2. "Addicted to a Dollar" Released: February 22, 1994; 3. "More Love" Released: June 14, 1994

More Love is the fifth studio album by American country music artist Doug Stone. Released in 1993 on Epic Records, it features the singles "I Never Knew Love," "Addicted to a Dollar," and "More Love," all of which were Top Ten hits on the Billboard Hot Country Singles & Tracks (now Hot Country Songs) charts.

== Content ==
"More Love" and "Dream High" were both featured on the soundtrack to the 1995 film Gordy, in which Stone starred.

"Little Sister’s Blue Jeans" was later covered by Canadian country music artist Chris Cummings on his 1996 debut album Somewhere Inside, as well as the 1998 self-titled re-release.

Stone produced nine of the ten songs with James Stroud. The last song, "Dream High", was produced by Stroud along with Tom Bahler and Bruce Swedien.

== Critical reception ==
Tom Roland of New Country magazine rated the album two stars out of five. His review criticized the album for "continu[ing] to mine the drippy side of Stone" through "manipulative" ballads, but cited "Addicted to a Dollar" and "Love, You Took Me by Surprise" as being "tougher" than Stone's previous works.

== Track listing ==
No.	Title	Writer(s)	Length
1.	"Addicted to a Dollar"	Doug Stone, Ray Hood, Kim Tribble, Ray Maddox	3:04
2.	"She Used to Love Me a Lot"	Stone, Dean Dillon	3:55
3.	"More Love"	Stone, Gary Burr	3:24
4.	"Little Sister's Blue Jeans"	Kim Williams, Randy Boudreaux	3:04
5.	"Small Steps"	Burr, Kenny Edwards	3:14
6.	"Wishbone"	Williams, Boudreaux	2:46
7.	"That's a Lie"	Stone, Boudreaux, Sam Hogin	2:56
8.	"Love, You Took Me by Surprise"	Stone, Boudreaux	2:55
9.	"I Never Knew Love"	Larry Boone, Will Robinson	3:31
10.	"Dream High"	Joe Henry, Mike Reid	4:17

== Personnel ==
As listed in liner notes.

- Mike Brignardello – bass guitar
- Larry Byrom – acoustic guitar
- Glen Duncan – fiddle
- Paul Franklin – steel guitar, Dobro, pedabro
- Sonny Garrish – steel guitar, Dobro, pedabro
- Rob Hajacos – fiddle
- Dann Huff – electric guitar
- Larry Paxton – bass guitar
- Matt Rollings – piano
- Gary Smith – piano
- Joe Spivey – fiddle, mandolin
- Doug Stone – lead vocals
- Tim Veasey – piano
- Lonnie Wilson – drums
- Glenn Worf – bass guitar
- Curtis Wright – background vocals
- Curtis Young – background vocals

== Chart performance ==
Chart (1993)	Peak position
U.S. Billboard Top Country Albums	20
U.S. Billboard 200	88
Canadian RPM Country Albums	5
