= From the Heart (Doug Stone album) =

Studio album by Doug Stone
- Released: August 11, 1992
- Recorded: 1992
- Studio: Nightingale Recording Studio, The Soundshop, Nashville, TN
- Genre: Country
- Length: 31:58
- Label: Epic
- Producer: Doug Johnson

Doug Stone chronology
I Thought It Was You (1991)	From the Heart (1992)	The First Christmas (1992)

Singles from From the Heart
- 1. "Warning Labels" Released: June 29, 1992; 2. "Too Busy Being in Love" Released: October 26, 1992; 3. "Made for Lovin' You" Released: February 22, 1993; 4. "Why Didn't I Think of That" Released: June 15, 1993

From The Heart is the third studio album by American country music singer Doug Stone. It was released on August 11, 1992 (see 1992 in country music) on Epic Records Nashville.

This album, certified gold in the U.S., provided Stone with four singles on the Hot Country Songs charts: the Top Five hits "Warning Labels" and "Made for Lovin' You", as well as the Number Ones "Why Didn't I Think of That" and "Too Busy Being in Love". "Made for Lovin' You" was previously recorded by Clinton Gregory on his 1990 debut album Music 'n Me, and by Dan Seals on his 1990 album On Arrival. "The Workin' End of a Hoe" was previously recorded by Gene Watson on his 1991 album At Last.

Professional ratings
Review scores
Source	Rating
Allmusic	link
Entertainment Weekly	C+ link
Chicago Tribune	4/4 stars

== Track listing ==
No.	Title	Writer(s)	Length
1.	"Warning Labels"	Kim Williams, Oscar Turman	2:59
2.	"Made for Lovin' You"	Curly Putman, Sonny Throckmorton	3:09
3.	"Leave Me the Radio"	Tim Nichols, Zack Turner, Billy Kirsch	3:09
4.	"This Empty House"	Ron Harbin, Doug Stone, Williams	3:41
5.	"Why Didn't I Think of That"	Paul Harrison, Bob McDill	3:12
6.	"Ain't Your Memory Got No Pride at All"	Bucky Jones, Red Lane, Royce Porter	3:18
7.	"The Workin' End of a Hoe"	Jim Rushing	2:46
8.	"Too Busy Being in Love"	Gary Burr, Victoria Shaw	3:53
9.	"She's Got a Future in the Movies"	Burr, Shaw	3:52
10.	"Left, Leavin', Goin', or Gone"	Frank J. Myers, Don Pfrimmer	2:59
Total length:			31:58

== Personnel ==
- Bobby All – acoustic guitar
- Jerry Douglas – Dobro
- Paul Franklin – steel guitar, Dobro
- Rob Hajacos – fiddle
- Owen Hale – drums
- Michael Jones – background vocals
- Kirk "Jellyroll" Johnson – harmonica
- Blue Miller – electric guitar, background vocals
- Mark Morris – percussion
- Steve Nathan – keyboards
- Mark O'Connor – fiddle
- Dave Pomeroy – bass guitar
- Brent Rowan – electric guitar
- Doug Stone – lead vocals
- Biff Watson – acoustic guitar
- Willie Weeks – bass guitar
- Glenn Worf – bass guitar

== Chart performance ==
Chart (1992)	Peak position
U.S. Billboard Top Country Albums	19
U.S. Billboard 200	99
