= Addicted to a Dollar =

Single by Doug Stone

from the album More Love
- B-side: "That's a Lie"
- Released: February 22, 1994
- Genre: Country
- Length: 3:05
- Label: Epic 77375
- Songwriters: Doug Stone, Ray Hood, Kim Tribble, Ray Maddox
- Producers: James Stroud and Doug Stone

Doug Stone singles chronology
"I Never Knew Love" (1993)	"Addicted to a Dollar" (1994)	"More Love" (1994)

"Addicted to a Dollar" is a song co-written and recorded by American country music singer Doug Stone, who wrote it along with Ray Hood, Kim Tribble and Ray Maddox. It was released in February 1994 as the second single from his album More Love. The song was a number four country hit in the US, and number one in Canada.

== Content ==
"Addicted to a Dollar" centralizes on the male narrator, a blue collar worker struggling to maintain financial stability.

== Music video ==
The music video was directed by Marius Penczner, and features Doug Stone singing the song at a concert in at The Pyramid in Memphis, Tennessee.

== Critical reception ==
Dan Cooper of Allmusic cited "Addicted to a Dollar" as a standout track on More Love, saying that with the song, "Stone stakes his claim for 'hot country' status alongside all his Nashville peers." Tom Roland also described the song favorably in his review for New Country magazine, where he wrote that the song "captures the stalwart traditional voice behind the balladeer."

== Chart positions ==
Chart (1994)	Peak position
Canada Country Singles (RPM)	1
US Hot Country Songs (Billboard)	4

=== Year-end charts ===
Chart (1994)	Position
Canada Country Tracks (RPM)	7
US Country Songs (Billboard)	55
