= Take a Letter Maria =

1969 single by R. B. Greaves

Single by R. B. Greaves

from the album R. B. Greaves
- B-side: "Big Bad City"
- Released: September 1969
- Genre: Soul
- Length: 2:44
- Label: Atco/Atlantic
- Songwriter: R.B. Greaves
- Producer: Ahmet Ertegun

R. B. Greaves singles chronology
"Take a Letter Maria" (1969)	"Always Something There to Remind Me" (1970)

"Take a Letter Maria" is the debut single written and recorded by American soul singer R. B. Greaves. It was recorded at Muscle Shoals Sound Studio on August 19, 1969, using the house studio musicians. These include Donna Jean Thatcher on vocals (later Donna Jean Godchaux of the Grateful Dead), Roger Hawkins on drums, Barry Beckett on electric piano, Eddie Hinton and Jimmy Johnson on guitar, David Hood on bass, and Mel Lastie on trumpet. "Take a Letter Maria" was released in September 1969, and quickly gained regular airplay. The single peaked at No. 2 on the Billboard Hot 100, and was kept from the top spot by the 5th Dimension's "Wedding Bell Blues". It was the last #2 hit of the 1960s.

The single was certified gold by November 1969; one million copies had shipped. By 1970, sales totalled 2.5 million.

== Background ==
"Take a Letter Maria" has a Latin music flavor, complete with a mariachi-style horn section, and tells of a man who has learned of his wife's infidelity the night before. He dictates a letter of separation to Maria, his secretary, whom he asks out for dinner later in the song in order to "start a new life."

== Chart positions ==
Chart (1969–1970)	Peak position
U.S. Billboard Hot 100	2
U.S. Billboard Best Selling Soul Singles	10
U.S. Billboard Easy Listening	21
Argentina	2
Australia Kent Music Report	6
Canada RPM (magazine)	3
New Zealand (Listener)	7

== Personnel ==
- R.B Greaves- Vocals
- Eddie Hinton and Jimmy Johnson- guitars
- Barry Beckett- Electric Piano
- David Hood- Bass
- Roger Hawkins- Drums
- Donna Jean Thatcher- Vocals
- Melvin Lastie- Trumpet

== Cover versions ==
"Take a Letter Maria" has had two charted cover versions by country music singers:

  - Anthony Armstrong Jones, from his album of the same name, hitting #8 on Hot Country Songs in 1970.
  - In 1999, Doug Stone released the song from his album Make Up in Love, reaching #45 on Hot Country Songs.
- Jimmy Ruffin recorded his take with Motown on his album The Groove Governor released in 1970.
- Wayne McGhie and the Sounds of Joy covered it on their 1970 album, which had little success at the time but was reissued on Light in the Attic Records in 2004.
- The New Riders of the Purple Sage included the song on their 1975 album Oh, What a Mighty Time.
- The alt-country supergroup The Pleasure Barons produced a high-energy rendition on their Live in Las Vegas CD, with vocals by Country Dick Montana of the Beat Farmers.
- Gary Puckett, on his Greatest Hits CD in 1986.
- Country music singer Sammy Kershaw, on the 2015 album I Won't Back Down.

== Song in popular culture ==
- In 1992, the song was featured in The Wonder Years, in the sixth-season episode "Kevin Delivers".
- In 1994, it was featured in the soundtrack of The Adventures of Priscilla, Queen of the Desert.
- In 1995, it was featured in the episode Home Season 2, Episode 9 of ER when Carol and Shep dance to it in her new home. However, the song has meaning with another storyline as Mark discovers his wife is in a relationship with someone else.
