= R. B. Greaves =

American singer (1943–2012)

R.B. Greaves
- Born: Ronald Bertram Aloysius Greaves III; 28 November 1943; Georgetown, Guyana
- Died: 27 September 2012 (aged 68) Granada Hills, California, U.S.
- Genres: R&B, soul, pop
- Occupation: Singer
- Years active: 1969–1977
- Labels: Atco Records, Bareback, Sunflower Records

Ronald Bertram Aloysius Greaves III (28 November 1943 – 27 September 2012) was an American singer who had chart success in 1969 with the pop single "Take a Letter Maria". A number-two hit on the Billboard Hot 100 chart, this single sold one million copies, and it earned gold record certification from the Recording Industry Association of America (RIAA). Greaves also reached the Top 40 in early 1970 with "(There's) Always Something There to Remind Me".

== Biography ==
Greaves was born in 1943 on the US Army Air Forces base at Georgetown, Guyana. A nephew of Sam Cooke, he grew up on a Seminole Indian reservation in the United States, but he moved to England in 1963.

Greaves had built a career both in the Caribbean and in the UK, where he performed under the name Sonny Childe with his group the TNTs. His debut recording, "Take a Letter Maria", was released under the name R.B. Greaves and produced by the president of Atlantic Records, Ahmet Ertegün.

The song is the story of a man who learns of his wife's infidelity and dictates a letter of separation to Maria, his secretary, who the last verse suggests may become his new love. The song has a distinct Latin flavor, complete with a mariachi-style horn section.

The record stayed in the Billboard chart for 15 weeks in the United States, selling a million copies. It received gold record certification from the RIAA on 11 December 1969. By 1970, sales of this song totaled 2.5 million.

In the early 1970s, Greaves spent time in Southern California, and was often accompanied at live shows and on recordings by his longtime friends Phillip John Diaz, a guitarist, and Michael "Papabax" Baxter, a songwriter and keyboardist.

Greaves recorded a series of cover versions as follow-ups, including Burt Bacharach and Hal David's "(There's) Always Something There to Remind Me" and Procol Harum's "A Whiter Shade of Pale". Greaves left the label in the 1970s in favour of Sunflower Records, and then signed with Bareback Records. His only chart release for the latter label was "Margie, Who's Watching the Baby".

In September, 2012, Greaves died from prostate cancer in Granada Hills, California. He was 68 years old.

== Discography ==
=== Albums ===
Year	Album	Peak chart positions	
Year	Album	US	US R&B
1969	R.B. Greaves: Released: 1969; Label: Atco Records; Format: LP album	85	24
1977	R.B. Greaves: Released: 1977; Label: Bareback Records; Format: LP album	—	—

=== Singles ===
Year	Single	Peak chart positions					RIAA	Album
Year	Single	US	US R&B	US AC	AUS	CAN	RIAA	Album
1969	"Take a Letter, Maria"	2	10	21	6	3	Gold	R.B. Greaves
1970	"(There's) Always Something There to Remind Me"	27	50	3	48	12		R.B. Greaves
1970	"Fire & Rain"	82	—	—	82	74		Single only
1970	"Georgia Took Her Back"	88	—	—	—	86		Single only
1970	"Whiter Shade of Pale"	82	—	—	—	85		Single only
1972	"Margie, Who's Watching the Baby"	115	—	—	—	—		Single only
1977	"Who's Watching the Baby (Margie)"	—	66	—	—	—		R.B. Greaves (1977)

"—" denotes releases that did not chart or were not certified
