= Doug Stone (album) =

Studio album by Doug Stone
- Released: March 12, 1990
- Recorded: 1989–1990
- Studio: Pyramid Recording Studio, Lookout Mountain, GA Southern Tracks Recording Studio, Atlanta GA Mastermix, NY Bennett House, Franklin, TN Nightingale Recording Studio, The Reflections, Nashville, TN
- Genre: Country
- Length: 31:45
- Label: Epic
- Producer: Doug Johnson

Doug Stone chronology
Doug Stone (1990)	I Thought It Was You (1991)

Singles from Doug Stone
- 1. "I'd Be Better Off (In a Pine Box)" Released: February 1, 1990; 2. "Fourteen Minutes Old" Released: June 28, 1990; 3. "These Lips Don't Know How to Say Goodbye" Released: October 31, 1990; 4. "In a Different Light" Released: February 1991

Professional ratings
Review scores
Source	Rating
AllMusic	4.5/5 stars

Doug Stone is the debut studio album by American country music singer Doug Stone, released in 1990. It features the singles "I'd Be Better Off (In a Pine Box)", "Fourteen Minutes Old", "In a Different Light", and "These Lips Don't Know How to Say Goodbye", all of which charted in the Top Ten on the Billboard country charts. "In a Different Light" was Stone's first Number One on that chart.

The track "High Weeds and Rust" was later recorded by David Lee Murphy on his debut album Out with a Bang. "We Always Agree on Love" was originally recorded by Atlanta in 1987.

== Track listing ==
No.	Title	Writer(s)	Length
1.	"I'd Be Better Off (In a Pine Box)"	Johnny MacRae, Steve Clark	3:20
2.	"Fourteen Minutes Old"	A.L. "Doodle" Owens, Dennis Knutson	2:55
3.	"In a Different Light"	Bucky Jones, Dickey Lee, Bob McDill	3:28
4.	"Turn This Thing Around"	Gary Harrison, Gene Nelson	2:31
5.	"Crying on Your Shoulder Again"	Larry Boone, Paul Nelson	3:28
6.	"These Lips Don't Know How to Say Goodbye"	Harlan Howard	3:30
7.	"We Always Agree on Love"	Doug Johnson	2:35
8.	"My Hat's Off to Him"	Randy Boudreaux	3:47
9.	"It's a Good Thing I Don't Love You Anymore"	Bobby P. Barker, Keith Palmer	3:06
10.	"High Weeds and Rust"	David Lee Murphy	2:57

== Personnel ==
- Bobby All – acoustic guitar
- Paul Franklin – steel guitar, Dobro
- Owen Hale – drums
- Kirk "Jellyroll" Johnson – harmonica
- Michael Jones – background vocals on all tracks
- Mac McAnally – acoustic guitar
- Mark Morris – percussion
- Steve Nathan – keyboards
- Mark O'Connor – fiddle, mandolin
- Brent Rowan – electric guitar
- Doug Stone – acoustic guitar, lead vocals
- Willie Weeks – bass guitar
- Dennis Wilson – additional background vocals on "I'd Be Better Off (In a Pine Box)"

== Charts ==
=== Weekly charts ===
Chart (1990)	Peak position
US Billboard 200	97
US Top Country Albums (Billboard)	12

=== Year-end charts ===
Chart (1990)	Position
US Top Country Albums (Billboard)	34
Chart (1991)	Position
US Top Country Albums (Billboard)	25

== Certifications ==
Region	Certification	Certified units/sales
United States (RIAA)	Platinum	1,000,000^{^}
^{^} Shipments figures based on certification alone.
