= More Love (Doug Stone song) =

Single by Doug Stone

from the album More Love
- B-side: "She Used to Love Me a Lot"
- Released: June 14, 1994
- Genre: Country
- Length: 3:25
- Label: Epic
- Songwriters: Gary Burr, Doug Stone
- Producers: James Stroud, Doug Stone

Doug Stone singles chronology
"Addicted to a Dollar" (1994)	"More Love" (1994)	"Little Houses" (1994)

"More Love" is a song co-written and recorded by American country music singer Doug Stone. It was released in June 1994 as the third and final single and title track from his album More Love. It peaked at number 6 on the Billboard Hot Country Singles & Tracks chart and number 4 on The Canadian RPM Tracks chart. The song was written by Stone and Gary Burr.

== Chart performance ==
Chart (1994)	Peak position
Canada Country Singles (RPM)	4
US Hot Country Songs (Billboard)	6

=== Year-end charts ===
Chart (1994)	Position
Canada Country Tracks (RPM)	97
US Country Songs (Billboard)	73
