= Made for Lovin' You (Dan Seals song) =

Single by Doug Stone

from the album From the Heart
- B-side: "She's Got a Future in the Movies"
- Released: February 22, 1993
- Genre: Country
- Length: 3:09
- Label: Epic #74885
- Songwriters: Sonny Throckmorton; Curly Putman
- Producer: Doug Johnson

Doug Stone singles chronology
"Too Busy Being in Love" (1992)	"Made for Lovin' You" (1993)	"Why Didn't I Think of That" (1993)

"Made for Lovin' You" is a song written by Sonny Throckmorton and Curly Putman. First appearing on Dan Seals' 1990 album On Arrival, it was also recorded by Clinton Gregory on his album Music 'n Me. Gregory's version of the song was released as a single, but did not chart.

In 1993, Doug Stone included the song on his album From the Heart for Epic Records. Stone's version was a Top Ten country music hit in 1993, peaking at number 6 on Hot Country Singles & Tracks.

== Chart performance ==
"Made for Lovin' You" debuted at number 57 on the U.S. Billboard Hot Country Singles & Tracks for the week of February 27, 1993.

== Charts ==
=== Weekly charts ===
Chart (1993)	Peak position
Canada Country Singles (RPM)	15
US Hot Country Songs (Billboard)	6

=== Year-end charts ===
Chart (1993)	Position
US Country Songs (Billboard)	45
