= I'd Be Better Off (In a Pine Box) =

Single by Doug Stone

from the album Doug Stone
- B-side: "It's a Good Thing I Don't Love You Anymore"
- Released: February 1, 1990
- Recorded: 1989
- Genre: Country
- Length: 3:20
- Label: Epic 73895
- Songwriters: Johnny MacRae, Steve Clark
- Producer: Doug Johnson

Doug Stone singles chronology
"I'd Be Better Off (In a Pine Box)" (1990)	"Fourteen Minutes Old" (1990)

"I'd Be Better Off (In a Pine Box)" is a debut song written by Johnny MacRae and Steve Clark, and recorded by American country music artist Doug Stone. It was released in February 1990 as the first single from his self titled debut album. It peaked at #4 on the Billboard Hot Country Singles & Tracks chart and #5 on The Canadian RPM Tracks chart. It was also nominated for a Grammy Award for Best Male Country Vocal Performance.

== Content ==
In this song, the narrator describes the anguish he feels knowing that the woman who left him has found love with another man and will never come back to him. His pain is so great he is considering suicide or murder to end it. Killing himself (and being shipped home in a pauper's casket) or killing them (and spending his life in prison) seem preferable to having "her and him together" on his mind.

== Music video ==
The music video was directed by directing duo Deaton-Flanigen. The video features Stone singing the song in a motel room, with him hitchhiking for a ride. At the end of the video, it shows his former lover marrying another man. As Stone walks away, the woman takes a glance at him as the limo that she and her new husband is in leaves the church.

== Critical reception ==
Brian Mansfield of Allmusic praised the song by calling it "a towering expression of self-pity that most singers could spend a career trying to top".

== Chart performance ==
Chart (1990)	Peak position
Canada Country Singles (RPM)	5
US Hot Country Songs (Billboard)	4

=== Year-end charts ===
Chart (1990)	Position
Canada Country Tracks (RPM)	65
US Country Songs (Billboard)	34
