= In a Different Light (song) =

Single by Doug Stone

from the album Doug Stone
- B-side: "Turn This Thing Around"
- Released: February 1991
- Recorded: 1990
- Genre: Country, country pop
- Length: 3:28
- Label: Epic 73741
- Songwriters: Bucky Jones, Dickey Lee, Bob McDill
- Producer: Doug Johnson

Doug Stone singles chronology
"These Lips Don't Know How to Say Goodbye" (1990)	"In a Different Light" (1991)	"I Thought It Was You" (1991)

"In a Different Light" (sometimes shortened to "Different Light") is a song written by Bob McDill, Dickey Lee and Bucky Jones, and recorded by American country music artist Doug Stone. It was released in February 1991 as the fourth and final single from his self-titled debut album. It peaked at number 1 in both the United States and Canada, thus becoming his first number one hit.

== Content ==
The song is about a male office worker who has a fantasy-come-true about one of his female co-workers, who—despite her apparent youthful appearance—is always bespectacled, her hair in a bun and conservatively dressed in business attire. The protagonist takes note of his male co-workers' lack of interest in the woman, while not letting on (to them) about his social encounters with the woman.

It is during these encounters that the protagonist reveals that "I see you (the co-worker) in a different light," remarking that he had seen the woman with her hair worn long and with "love in [her] eyes," revealing her physical beauty to him.

== Chart positions ==
Chart (1991)	Peak position
Canada Country Singles (RPM)	1
US Hot Country Songs (Billboard)	1

=== Year-end charts ===
Chart (1991)	Position
Canada Country Tracks (RPM)	42
US Country Songs (Billboard)	5
