= Wynonna Judd discography =

Discography

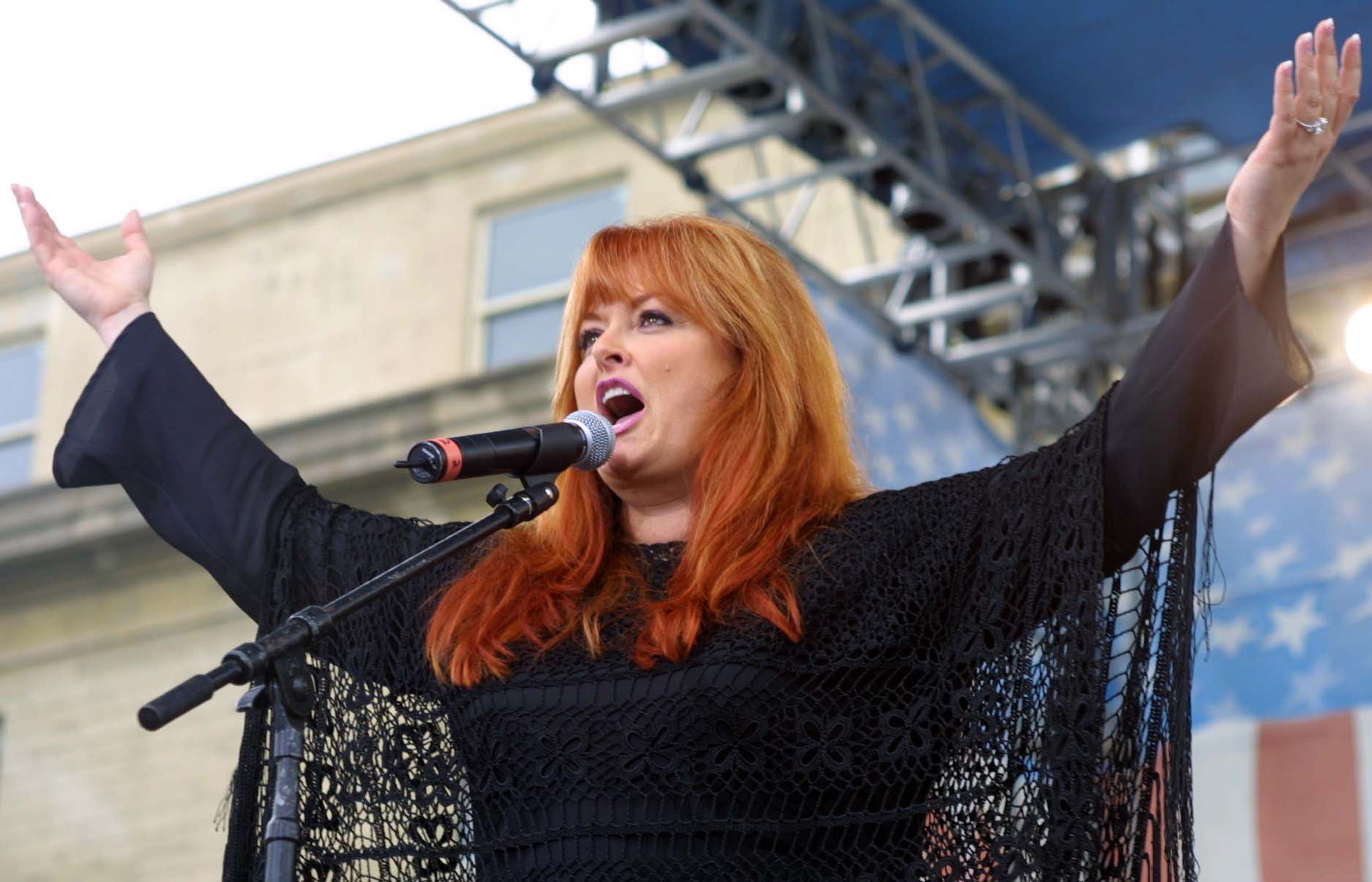
- Wynonna performing at the Pentagon in 2004.
- Studio albums: 10
- Extended plays: 1
- Live albums: 1
- Compilation albums: 4
- Singles: 44
- Video albums: 2
- Music videos: 11
- Other charted songs: 1

The discography of American country music artist Wynonna Judd contains ten studio albums, four compilation albums, two video albums, one live album, one extended play (EP), 44 singles, 11 music videos and one other-charting song. She achieved success as one half of the mother-daughter duo, The Judds. In 1991, the duo split and Wynonna signed a solo recording contract with MCA Records that year. In March 1992, her debut studio album entitled Wynonna reached number one on the Billboard Top Country Albums chart and number four on the Billboard 200. The album spawned three number one hits on the Billboard Hot Country Songs chart: "She Is His Only Need," "I Saw the Light" and "No One Else on Earth." The album also sold over five million copies. In 1993, it was followed by Tell Me Why, which certified platinum in the United States. It also topped the country albums chart and reached number five on the Billboard 200 It spawned five more top ten country hits, including the title track and "Rock Bottom."

In 1996, her third studio album Revelations was issued. It produced the number one hit "To Be Loved by You" and reached number two on the Billboard country albums chart. It was followed by 1997's The Other Side, which debuted in the Billboard country top five. It spawned two top 20 hits, including "When Love Starts Talkin'." In 2000, Judd released her fifth studio album, New Day Dawning, which produced no major hit singles. In 2003, Judd returned with her sixth studio effort, What the World Needs Now Is Love. It reached number one on the Top Country Albums chart and number eight on the Billboard 200. It produced Judd's final top 20 country hit: "What the World Needs." In 2005, she released her first live effort entitled Her Story: Scenes from a Lifetime. Its only single, "Attitude," is her final country top 40 hit to date. In 2006, her first holiday album reached number ten on the country albums chart. In 2009, she issued an album of cover songs entitled Sing: Chapter 1. The title track reached number four on the Billboard Hot Dance Club Songs chart. In 2016, Judd released her eighth studio offering called Wynonna & the Big Noise on Curb Records.

== Albums ==
=== Studio albums ===
List of albums, with selected chart positions and certifications, showing other relevant details
Title	Album details	Peak chart positions				Certifications
Title	Album details	US	US Cou.	CAN	CAN Cou.	Certifications
Wynonna	Released: March 31, 1992; Label: Curb/MCA; Formats: Cassette, CD, LP	4	1	43	1	MC: 2× Platinum; RIAA: 5× Platinum
Tell Me Why (Note: Tell Me Why also reached number 64 on the Dutch albums chart.)	Released: May 11, 1993; Label: Curb/MCA; Formats: Cassette, CD	5	1	29	—	MC: Platinum; RIAA: Platinum
Revelations	Released: February 13, 1996; Label: Curb/MCA; Formats: Cassette, CD	9	2	3	1	MC: Gold; RIAA: Platinum
The Other Side	Released: October 21, 1997; Label: Curb/Universal; Formats: Cassette, CD	38	5	—	17	RIAA: Gold
New Day Dawning	Released: February 1, 2000; Label: Curb/Mercury; Formats: Cassette, CD	40	5	—	6	
What the World Needs Now Is Love	Released: August 5, 2003; Label: Asylum/Curb; Formats: CD	8	1	—	—	
A Classic Christmas (Note: A Classic Christmas also peaked at number 14 on the Billboard Top Holiday Albums chart.)	Released: October 10, 2006; Label: Asylum/Curb; Formats: CD, music download	53	10	—	—	
Sing: Chapter 1	Released: February 3, 2009; Label: Curb; Formats: CD, music download	37	5	—	—	
Wynonna & the Big Noise	Released: February 12, 2016; Label: Curb; Formats: CD, music download, LP	162	14	—	—	
The Hard Truth	Released: October 2, 2026; Label: Anti-; Formats: CD, music download, LP	—	45	—	—	
"—" denotes a recording that did not chart or was not released in that territory.

=== Compilation albums ===
List of albums, with selected chart positions, showing other relevant details
Title	Album details	Peak chart positions		
Title	Album details	US	US Cou.	CAN Cou.
Collection	Released: April 8, 1997; Label: Curb/MCA; Formats: Cassette, CD	72	9	8
Love Heals	Released: May 24, 2010; Label: Cracker Barrel/Curb; Formats: CD	32	6	—
Love Can Build a Bridge: Songs of Faith, Hope & Love	Released: 2015; Label: Cracker Barrel; Formats: CD	—	—	—
All-Time Greatest Hits	Released: August 10, 2018; Label: Curb; Formats: Music download	—	—	—
"—" denotes a recording that did not chart or was not released in that territory.

=== Live albums ===
List of albums, with selected chart positions, showing other relevant details
Title	Album details	Peak chart positions	
Title	Album details	US	US Cou.
Her Story: Scenes from a Lifetime	Released: September 27, 2005; Label: Asylum/Curb; Formats: CD, music download	25	2
Back to Wy Live	Released: September 6, 2024; Label: Anti-; Formats: LP, music download	—	—

== Extended plays ==
List of EPs, showing other relevant details
Title	EP details
Recollections	Released: October 30, 2020; Label: Anti; Formats: CD, music download

== Singles ==
=== As lead artist ===
List of singles, with selected chart positions, showing other relevant details
Title	Year	Peak chart positions						Certifications	Album
Title	Year	US	US Cou.	US AC	US Dan.	CAN Cou.	GER	Certifications	Album
"She Is His Only Need" (Note: "She Is His Only Need" also peaked at number 22 on the RPM Adult Contemporary chart in Canada.)	1992	—	1	25	—	1	—		Wynonna
"I Saw the Light"	1992	—	1	—	—	1	76		Wynonna
"No One Else on Earth"	1992	83	1	35	—	1	—	RIAA: Gold	Wynonna
"My Strongest Weakness"	1992	— (Note: "My Strongest Weakness" did not enter the Hot 100, but peaked at number 19 on Bubbling Under Hot 100 Singles, which acts as a 25-song extension of the Hot 100.)	4	—	—	4	—		Wynonna
"Tell Me Why"	1993	77	3	24	—	1	56		Tell Me Why
"Father Sun" (Note: "Father Sun" was only released in Germany.)	1993	—	—	—	—	—	—		Tell Me Why
"Only Love"	1993	— (Note: "Only Love" did not enter the Hot 100, but peaked at number 2 on Bubbling Under Hot 100 Singles, which acts as a 25-song extension of the Hot 100.)	3	—	—	3	—		Tell Me Why
"Is It Over Yet"	1993	—	6	—	—	8	—		Tell Me Why
"Let's Make a Baby King"	1993	—	61	—	—	—	—		Tell Me Why
"Rock Bottom"	1994	—	2	—	—	5	—		Tell Me Why
"Girls with Guitars"	1994	—	10	—	—	9	—		Tell Me Why
"To Be Loved by You"	1996	—	1	25	—	3	—		Revelations
"Heaven Help My Heart"	1996	—	14	—	—	5	—		Revelations
"My Angel Is Here"	1996	—	44	—	—	22	—		Revelations
"Somebody to Love You"	1996	—	55	—	—	51	—		Revelations
"Making My Way" (Note: "Making My Way" was only released in the United Kingdom.)	1997	—	—	—	—	—	—		Collection
"When Love Starts Talkin'"	1997	98	13	—	—	6	—		The Other Side
"Come Some Rainy Day"	1997	—	14	—	—	12	—		The Other Side
"Always Will"	1998	—	45	—	—	47	—		The Other Side
"Woman to Woman"	1998	—	62	—	—	72	—		Tammy Wynette Remembered
"Freedom"	1998	—	68	—	—	85	—		The Prince of Egypt: Nashville
"Can't Nobody Love You (Like I Do)"	1999	—	31	—	—	49	—		New Day Dawning
"Going Nowhere"	2000	—	43	—	—	57	—		New Day Dawning
"What the World Needs"	2003	70	14	—	—	—	—		What the World Needs Now Is Love
"Heaven Help Me"	2003	—	37	—	—	—	—		What the World Needs Now Is Love
"Flies on the Butter (You Can't Go Home Again)" (with Naomi Judd)	2004	—	33	—	—	—	—		What the World Needs Now Is Love
"I Want to Know What Love Is"	2004	—	—	14	12	—	—		What the World Needs Now Is Love
"Rescue Me"	2005	—	—	—	—	—	—		What the World Needs Now Is Love
"Attitude"	2005	—	40	—	—	—	—		Her Story: Scenes from a Lifetime
"Santa Claus Is Coming to Town"	2006	—	54	3	—	—	—		A Classic Christmas
"I Hear You Knocking"	2009	—	—	—	—	—	—		Sing: Chapter 1
"Sing"	2009	—	—	—	4	—	—		Sing: Chapter 1
"When I Fall in Love"	2009	—	—	—	—	—	—		Sing: Chapter 1
"Love It Out Loud"	2011	—	—	—	—	—	—		Non-album singles
"Something You Can't Live Without"	2013	—	—	—	—	—	—		Non-album singles
"Cool Ya"	2016	—	—	—	—	—	—		Wynonna & the Big Noise
"Kentucky Queen"	2026	—	—	—	—	—	—		The Hard Truth
"—" denotes a recording that did not chart or was not released in that territory.

=== As a featured artist ===
List of singles, with selected chart positions, showing other relevant details
Title	Year	Peak chart positions			Album
Title	Year	US	US Cou.	CAN Cou.	Album
"A Bad Goodbye" (Clint Black with Wynonna Judd)	1993	43	2	1	No Time to Kill
"Healing" (Michael English with Wynonna Judd)	1994	—	—	—	Healing
"Girl Thang" (Tammy Wynette with Wynonna Judd)	1994	—	67	—	Without Walls
"This Is the Time" (Michael Bolton with Wynonna Judd)	1996	—	—	—	This Is the Time: The Christmas Album
"Mary, Did You Know?" (Kenny Rogers with Wynonna Judd)	1997	—	55	—	The Gift
"I'm Not in Love Yet" (Huey Lewis and the News with Wynonna Judd)	2001	—	—	—	Plan B
"I Can't Stand the Rain" (Sam Moore with Wynonna Judd)	2006	—	—	—	Overnight Sensational
"Hearts I Leave Behind" (Pete Scobell with Wynonna Judd)	2015	— (Note: "Hearts I Leave Behind" did not enter the Hot 100, but peaked at number 21 on Bubbling Under Hot 100 Singles, which acts as a 25-song extension of the Hot 100.)	30	—	Walkin' a Wire
"—" denotes a recording that did not chart or was not released in that territory.

== Other charted songs ==
List of singles, with selected chart positions, showing other relevant details
Title	Year	Peak chart positions	Album
Title	Year	US AC	Album
"Winter Wonderland"	2007	18	A Classic Christmas

== Videography ==
=== Video albums ===
List of albums, showing certifications and other relevant details
Title	Album details	Certifications
Music in High Places: Live from Venice	Released: June 18, 2002; Label: Image; Formats: DVD	
Her Story: Scenes from a Lifetime	Released: September 27, 2005; Label: Asylum/Curb; Formats: DVD	RIAA: Gold

=== Music videos ===
List of music videos, showing year released and director
Title	Year	Director(s)	Ref.
"No One Else on Earth"	1992	Randee St. Nicolas	
"Tell Me Why" (Live from Center Stage)	1993	—N/a	
"A Bad Goodbye" (with Clint Black)	1993	Peter Nydrle	
"Only Love"	1993	Bud Schaetzle	
"Healing" (with Michael English)	1994	Randee St. Nicolas	
"Mary, Did You Know?" (with Kenny Rogers)	1996	Kelly Junkerman	
"When Love Starts Talkin'"	1997	Bobby Roth	
"Come Some Rainy Day"	1998	Clay Jacobsen	
"Woman to Woman"	1998	Randee St. Nicolas	
"Heaven Help Me"	2003	Trey Fanjoy	
"I Can Only Imagine"	2005	James Burton Yockey	

== See also ==
- The Judds discography
