= All-Time Greatest Hits (Wynonna Judd album) =

Compilation album by Wynonna Judd
- Released: August 10, 2018
- Recorded: 1992–2016
- Genre: Country
- Length: 77:21
- Label: Curb / MCA
- Producer: Tony Brown, Don Potter

Wynonna Judd chronology
Wynonna & the Big Noise (2016)	All-Time Greatest Hits (2018)

All-Time Greatest Hits is the title of the fourth compilation album released by the American country music artist Wynonna Judd. It was released on August 10, 2018 via digital download and on streaming platforms. No physical version was released.

The compilation reprises twenty tracks from her studio albums: her 1992 self-titled debut, 1993's Tell Me Why, 1996's Revelations, 1997's The Other Side, 2003's What The World Needs Now Is Love, and her 2009 covers album Sing: Chapter 1. In addition, "I Can Only Imagine", recorded live at the Ryman Auditorium, from her 2005 live album Her Story: Scenes from a Lifetime is included, along with the track "Jesus and a Jukebox" from 2016's Wynonna & the Big Noise.

The album also includes two duets previously unavailable on a Wynonna release; her duet A Bad Goodbye with Clint Black, and her Christmas single with Kenny Rogers, "Mary, Did You Know?".

No songs were included from Wynonna's fifth studio album New Day Dawning.

== Track listing ==
1. "She Is His Only Need" (Dave Loggins) – 4:28
2. "I Saw the Light" (Andrew Gold, Lisa Angelle) – 3:56
3. "No One Else on Earth" (Jill Colucci, Stewart Harris, Sam Lorber) – 3:59
4. "My Strongest Weakness" (Naomi Judd, Mike Reid) – 4:23
5. "Tell Me Why" (Karla Bonoff) – 3:50
6. "A Bad Goodbye" (Duet with Clint Black) (Clint Black) – 3:41
7. "Only Love" (Marcus Hummon, Roger Murrah) – 3:35
8. "Is It Over Yet" (Billy Kirsch) – 3:48
9. "Rock Bottom" (Buddy Buie, J.R. Cobb) – 3:07
10. "Girls with Guitars" (Mary Chapin Carpenter) – 3:17
11. "To Be Loved by You" (Gary Burr, Reid) – 4:51
12. "Heaven Help My Heart" (Single Edit) (Tina Arena, Dean McTaggart, David Tyson) – 4:42
13. "When Love Starts Talkin'" (Brent Maher, Gary Nicholson, Jamie O'Hara) - 3:09
14. "Come Some Rainy Day" (Billy Kirsch, Bat McGrath) - 3:15
15. "What the World Needs" (Brett James, Holly Lamar) - 3:36
16. "I Want to Know What Love Is" (Single Edit) (Mick Jones) - 4:06
17. "I Can Only Imagine" (Edit) (Bart Millard) – 3:59
18. "Sing" (Single Edit) (Rodney Crowell) - 3:44
19. "Jesus and a Jukebox" (Travis Meadows, Jeremy Spillman, David Tolliver) – 3:48
20. "Mary, Did You Know?" (Duet with Kenny Rogers) (Buddy Greene, Mark Lowry) – 3:53
