= Love Heals =

Compilation album by Wynonna Judd
- Released: May 24, 2010
- Recorded: 1992–2009
- Genre: Country
- Label: Cracker Barrel
- Producer: Various

Wynonna Judd chronology
Sing: Chapter 1 (2009)	Love Heals (2010)	Wynonna & the Big Noise (2016)

Love Heals is a compilation album from country music singer Wynonna Judd, released on May 24, 2010, exclusive to Cracker Barrel stores. It is her second compilation album following 1997's Collection and benefits the Wounded Warrior Project.

== Album information ==
Love Heals contains 11 of Wynonna's singles, 2 of which are presented in never-before released versions. It also includes the previously unreleased track "Let Your Light Shine" which is a cover of a song originally recorded by Keb' Mo' for his 2004 album Keep It Simple.

Each of Wynonna's studio albums is represented on this compilation with the exception of Revelations, New Day Dawning, and A Classic Christmas.

With the sale of every Love Heals CD, Cracker Barrel will donate a portion of the proceeds to Wounded Warrior Project and its care-giver programs.

== Track listing ==
1. "She Is His Only Need"^{1} (Dave Loggins) – 4:27
2. "No One Else on Earth"^{1} (Jill Colucci, Stewart Harris, Sam Lorber) – 4:01
3. "My Strongest Weakness"^{1} (Naomi Judd, Mike Reid) – 4:22
4. "Tell Me Why"^{2} (Karla Bonoff) – 3:48
5. "Only Love"^{2} (Roger Murrah, Marcus Hummon) – 3:33
6. "Rock Bottom"^{2} (Buddy Buie, J. R. Cobb) – 3:07
7. "What the World Needs"^{3} (Brett James, Holly Lamar) – 3:37
8. "Come Some Rainy Day"^{4} (Billy Kirsch, Bat McGrath) – 3:15
9. "Is It Over Yet"^{2} (Billy Kirsch) – 3:48
10. "Let Your Light Shine"^{5} (Keb' Mo', Jenny Yates)
11. "Sing" (Radio Mix)^{6} (Rodney Crowell) – 4:59
12. "When I Fall In Love" (Radio Edit)^{6} (Victor Young, Edward Heyman) – 4:17

Notes ^{1} Taken from Wynonna
^{2} Taken from Tell Me Why
^{3} Taken from What The World Needs Now Is Love
^{4} Taken from The Other Side
^{5} Previously unreleased
^{6} Original versions taken from Sing: Chapter 1

== Release history ==
Country	Date
United States	May 24, 2010

== Charts ==
Chart (2010)	Peak position
U.S. Billboard Top Country Albums	6
U.S. Billboard 200	32
