= Collection (Wynonna Judd album) =

Compilation album by Wynonna Judd
- Released: April 8, 1997
- Recorded: 1992–1997
- Genre: Country
- Length: 45:45
- Labels: Curb; MCA
- Producers: Tony Brown; Don Potter

Wynonna Judd chronology
Revelations (1996)	Collection (1997)	The Other Side (1997)

Professional ratings
Review scores
Source	Rating
AllMusic	4.5/5 stars
Uncut	3/5 stars

Collection is the first compilation album by American country music artist Wynonna Judd. The standard version of the album reprised 11 tracks from her first three studio albums: her 1992 self-titled debut, 1993's Tell Me Why, and 1996's Revelations. The standard edition of the album contained no new tracks, but a number of the songs were presented in remixed versions.

The Australian edition of the album was a more comprehensive collection and included an additional six tracks. This edition added the international singles "Making My Way (Any Way That I Can," "Father Sun," and Wynonna's duet with Michael English "Healing." It also included her cover of the Lynyrd Skynyrd's "Free Bird."

== Track listing ==
Standard edition
No.	Title	Writer(s)	Original album	Length
1.	"Heaven Help My Heart"	Tina Arena; Dean McTaggart; David Tyson	Revelations	6:08
2.	"I Saw the Light"	Andrew Gold; Lisa Angelle	Wynonna	3:55
3.	"She Is His Only Need"	Dave Loggins	Wynonna	4:27
4.	"Only Love"	Marcus Hummon; Roger Murrah	Tell Me Why	3:35
5.	"No One Else on Earth" (Club Mix)	Jill Colucci; Stewart Harris; Sam Lorber	Wynonna	4:15
6.	"Is It Over Yet" (Single Version)	Billy Kirsch	Tell Me Why	3:50
7.	"Tell Me Why"	Karla Bonoff	Tell Me Why	3:50
8.	"My Strongest Weakness"	Naomi Judd; Mike Reid	Wynonna	4:22
9.	"To Be Loved by You"	Gary Burr; Reid	Revelations	4:52
10.	"Rock Bottom" (Single Version)	Buddy Buie; J.R. Cobb	Tell Me Why	3:07
11.	"Girls with Guitars"	Mary Chapin Carpenter	Tell Me Why	3:17
Total length:				45:45

Australian edition
No.	Title	Writer(s)	Length
1.	"No One Else on Earth (Club Mix)"	Jill Colucci; Stewart Harris; Sam Lorber	4:15
2.	"Making My Way (Any Way That I Can)"
3.	"Somebody to Love You"
4.	"Change the World"
5.	"Heaven Help My Heart"	Tina Arena; Dean McTaggart; David Tyson	6:08
6.	"Healing (duet with Michael English)"
7.	"Rock Bottom (Single Version)"	Buddy Buie; J.R. Cobb	3:07
8.	"To Be Loved by You"	Gary Burr; Reid	4:52
9.	"Father Sun"
10.	"Free Bird"
11.	"Let's Make a Baby King"
12.	"Girls with Guitars"	Mary Chapin Carpenter	3:17
13.	"Only Love"	Marcus Hummon; Roger Murrah	3:35
14.	"I Saw the Light"	Andrew Gold; Lisa Angelle	3:55
15.	"She Is His Only Need"	Dave Loggins	4:27
16.	"My Strongest Weakness"	Naomi Judd; Mike Reid	4:22
17.	"Is It Over Yet (Single Version)"	Billy Kirsch	3:50
18.	"Tell Me Why"	Karla Bonoff	3:50

== Charts ==
Chart (1997)	Peak Position
U.S. Billboard Top Country Albums	9
U.S. Billboard 200	72
Canadian Country Albums Chart	8
