= Her Story: Scenes from a Lifetime =

Live album with studio track by Wynonna Judd
- Released: September 27, 2005
- Recorded: February 1, 2005
- Venue: Grand Ole Opry
- Genre: Country
- Length: 2:13:18
- Label: Curb / Asylum
- Producer: Dann Huff

Wynonna Judd chronology
What the World Needs Now Is Love (2003)	Her Story: Scenes from a Lifetime (2005)	A Classic Christmas (2006)

Professional ratings
Review scores
Source	Rating
Allmusic	3/5 stars

Her Story: Scenes from a Lifetime is a two-disc live compilation album released in 2005 by American country music artist Wynonna Judd. The album was recorded live at the Grand Ole Opry house on February 1, 2005. It features a mix of Wynonna's solo songs, songs that she originally recorded as one-half of The Judds, and some other cover songs. Also included is a bonus studio track, "Attitude", which was released as a single and peaked at No. 40 on the Hot Country Songs chart in late 2005. A DVD of this same concert was also released.

== Track listing ==
=== Disc one ===
1. "Dream Chaser" (Brent Maher, Jeffrey Bullock) – 4:40
2. "Girls' Night Out" (Maher, Bullock) – 2:45
3. "Love Is Alive" (Kent Robbins) – 3:58
4. "Maybe Your Baby's Got the Blues" (Graham Lyle, Troy Seals) – 3:42
5. "Young Love (Strong Love)" (Robbins, Paul Kennerley) – 4:28
6. "Let Me Tell You About Love" (Maher, Kennerley, Carl Perkins) – 5:34
7. "Love Can Build a Bridge" (Paul Overstreet, Naomi Judd, John Barlow Jarvis) – 5:17
8. "She Is His Only Need" (Dave Loggins) – 5:06
9. "Tell Me Why" (Karla Bonoff) – 4:41
10. "No One Else on Earth" (Jill Colucci, Stewart Harris, Sam Lorber) – 4:25
11. "That Was Yesterday" (N. Judd) – 8:26
12. "I Want to Know What Love Is" – (Mick Jones) – 6:51
13. "Is It Over Yet" (Billy Kirsch) – 3:59

=== Disc two ===
1. "Shining Star" (Phillip Bailey, Maurice White, Larry Dunn) – 3:07
2. "To Be Loved by You" (Gary Burr, Mike Reid) – 5:46
3. "Help Me" (Joni Mitchell) – 3:59
4. "Don't You Throw That Mojo on Me" (Kenny Wayne Shepherd, Mark Selby, Tia Sillers) – 3:48
5. "I'm the Only One" (Melissa Etheridge) – 4:38
6. "Sometimes I Feel Like Elvis" (Bryan White, Neil Thrasher, Derek George) – 4:02
7. "Burning Love" (Dennis Linde) – 4:46
8. "People Get Ready" (Curtis Mayfield) – 6:37
9. "I Can Only Imagine" (Bart Millard) – 5:09
10. "What the World Needs" (Brett James, Holly Lamar) – 5:33
11. "The Best" (Holly Knight, Mike Chapman) – 7:29
12. "Peace in This House" (Angela Kaset, Doug Gill) – 7:29
13. "When I Reach the Place I'm Going" (Emory Gordy Jr., Joe Henry) – 3:31
14. "Attitude" (Wynonna Judd, John Rich) – 3:32

== Personnel ==
The Wynonna Band

- Wynonna Judd – lead vocals, guitars
- Steve Cox – keyboards, acoustic piano
- Harry Sharpe – keyboards, guitars, musical director
- Randy Flowers – guitars
- Tony Obrohta – guitars, banjo, dobro
- Steve Mackey – bass guitar
- Steve Potts – drums
- Bob Bailey – vocals, band leader
- Vicki Hampton – vocals

== Charts and certifications ==
Chart (2005)	Peak position	RIAA certification
U.S. Billboard Top Country Albums	2	Gold
U.S. Billboard 200	25	Gold
