= Sing: Chapter 1 =

Studio album by Wynonna Judd
- Released: February 3, 2009
- Recorded: 2008–2009
- Genre: Country
- Length: 46:19
- Label: Curb
- Producers: Brent Maher, Don Potter

Wynonna Judd chronology
A Classic Christmas (2006)	Sing: Chapter 1 (2009)	Love Heals (2010)

Singles from Sing: Chapter 1
- 1. "I Hear You Knocking" Released: March 2009; 2. "Sing" Released: June 2009; 3. "When I Fall in Love" Released: November 2009

Professional ratings
Aggregate scores
Source	Rating
Metacritic	(70/100)
Review scores
Source	Rating
About.com	4.5/5 stars
Allmusic	4.5/5 stars
Country Universe	3.5/5 stars
Entertainment Weekly	C
Norfolk Daily News	3/4 stars
PopMatters	5/10 stars
Slant Magazine	3.5/5 stars

Sing: Chapter 1 is the seventh studio album from country music singer Wynonna Judd, released on February 3, 2009. It is her seventh solo studio album and the follow-up to her 2003 album What the World Needs Now Is Love and her holiday-themed 2006 release A Classic Christmas. This release celebrates Judd's 25th Anniversary in the music business.

== Background ==
Wynonna Judd teamed up with Brent Maher and Don Potter – the duo behind the many releases that Judd had as one half of the mother-daughter duo The Judds with mom Naomi Judd.

The album contains 11 cover songs, which Judd states "are a real cross-section of all the different genres I grew up with. It’s all me, its all part of the tapestry of who I am. This record is musical ADD. It's that simple. Every genre is represented on this record, and by God, it works. It's all the different chapters of my life," she said. "These are part of the backdrop of everyday life in the Judd family. It's snapshots ... of joy, pain, sorrow, life, death, divorce, kids, the whole enchilada."

The 12th song on the album is the title track and is the sole original song on the album, and was written by Rodney Crowell. The record label, Curb, commissioned dance remixes of the track by Almighty, Pete Hammond, Digital Dog and Jody den Broeder. The tracks are available together on a CD called Wynonna – Sing Remixes and were also released to DJs as CD promos. The maxi-single is available for digital download on iTunes.

Sing had been in production for over a year and a half. It includes Judd's first studio recording of Burt Bacharach's "Anyone Who Had A Heart." Wynonna previously recorded this song live for Bacharach's 1999 concert release One Amazing Night as well as in duet with Dionne Warwick for Warwick's 2006 album My Friends & Me.

== Commercial performance ==
In the United States, the album debuted at No. 37 on the Billboard 200 albums chart on its first week of release, with around 13,000 copies sold. It also debuted at No. 5 on the Billboard's Top Country Albums chart, and No. 18 on the Internet Albums chart. As of January 2016, the album has sold 60,000 copies in the US.

== Track listing ==
1. "That's How Rhythm Was Born" (George Whiting, J. C. Johnson, Nat Burton) – 3:05
2. "I'm So Lonesome I Could Cry" (Hank Williams) – 4:05
3. "Women Be Wise" (Sippie Wallace) – 4:39
4. "I Hear You Knocking" (Dave Bartholomew, Pearl King) – 2:55
5. "Till I Get It Right" (Larry Henley, Red Lane) – 3:23
6. "Are the Good Times Really Over" (Merle Haggard) – 4:49
7. "The House Is Rockin'" (Doyle Bramhall, Stevie Ray Vaughan) – 2:33
8. "Ain't No Sunshine" (Bill Withers) – 3:19
9. "I'm a Woman" (Jerry Leiber, Mike Stoller) – 4:04
10. "Anyone Who Had a Heart" (Burt Bacharach, Hal David) – 4:01
11. "When I Fall In Love" (Victor Young, Edward Heyman) – 4:17
12. "Sing" (Rodney Crowell) – 4:59

== Personnel ==
- Wynonna Judd – lead vocals, backing vocals
- Bruce Dailey – acoustic piano
- Gordon Mote – acoustic piano, Wurlitzer electric piano, organ
- Mike Rojas – acoustic piano, organ
- Fats Kaplin – accordion, fiddle
- Don Potter – synthesizers, acoustic guitars, electric guitars, archtop guitar, gut-string guitar, dobro, guitar solos
- Bob Britt – electric guitars
- Keb' Mo' – slide guitar
- Ilya Toshinsky – banjo
- Spencer Campbell – bass
- Glenn Worf – bass
- Eddie Bayers – drums
- Mike Maple – drums
- Nir Z – drums, congas
- Brent Maher – African drum, percussion
- Charlie McCoy – harmonica
- Mark Selby – harmonica
- Sam Levine – baritone saxophone, clarinet
- Mark Douthit – tenor saxophone
- Roy Agee – trombone
- Prentiss Hobbs – trombone, bass trombone
- Mike Haynes – trumpet
- Bergen White – string arrangements
- Carl Gorodetzky – string contractor
- The Nashville String Machine – strings
- Brian Beatty – backing vocals
- Kerry Beatty – backing vocals
- Bekka Bramlett – backing vocals
- Elicia Brown – backing vocals
- Jeremy Calloway – backing vocals
- Maurice Carter – backing vocals
- Vicki Hampton – backing vocals
- Jaimee Paul Shires – backing vocals
- Larry Strickland – backing vocals

== Charts ==
=== Album ===
Chart (2009)	Peak Position
U.S. Billboard Top Country Albums	5
U.S. Billboard 200	37

=== Singles ===
Year	Single	Chart Positions
Year	Single	US Dance
2009	"I Hear You Knocking"	—
2009	"Sing"	4
2009	"When I Fall in Love"	—
"—" denotes releases that did not chart

== Release history ==
Country	Date
United States	February 3, 2009
Canada	March 31, 2009
Australia	February 3, 2012
