= Can't Nobody Love You (Like I Do) =

Single by Wynonna Judd

from the album New Day Dawning
- B-side: "Help Me"
- Released: November 13, 1999
- Genre: Country
- Length: 3:18
- Label: Mercury; Curb
- Songwriter(s): Danny Orton; Cathy Majeski
- Producer(s): James Stroud; Wynonna Judd

Wynonna Judd singles chronology
"Freedom" (1999)	"Can't Nobody Love You (Like I Do)" (1999)	"Going Nowhere" (2000)

"Can't Nobody Love You (Like I Do)" is a song recorded by American country music artist Wynonna Judd. It was released in November 1999 as the first single from the album New Day Dawning. The song reached #31 on the Billboard Hot Country Singles & Tracks chart. The song was written by Danny Orton and Cathy Majeski.

== Chart performance ==
Chart (1999–2000)	Peak position
US Hot Country Songs (Billboard)	31
Canadian RPM Country Tracks	49
