= Michael English =

Michael or Mick English may refer to:

- Michael English (American singer) (born 1962), American Christian singer from North Carolina

- Michael English (album), his eponymous album released in 1991

- Michael English (cricketer) (born 1995), Scottish cricketer
- Michael English (illustrator) (1941–2009), British 1960s poster designer
- Michael English (Irish singer) (born 1979), Irish country singer
- Michael English (politician) (1930–2019), British Labour Member of Parliament for Nottingham West 1964–1983
- Mick English (Australian footballer) (1882–1937), Australian rules footballer
- Mick English (rugby union) (1933–2010), Irish rugby union player
