= Sing (Wynonna Judd song) =

Single by Wynonna Judd

from the album Sing: Chapter 1
- Released: 2009
- Genre: Country, Dance
- Length: 4:59
- Label: Asylum-Curb
- Songwriter: Rodney Crowell
- Producers: Brent Maher, Don Potter

Wynonna Judd singles chronology
"I Hear You Knocking" (2009)	"Sing" (2009)	"When I Fall in Love" (2009)

"Sing" is a song written by Rodney Crowell and recorded by American country artist Wynonna Judd. The song was the second single released from her 2009 studio album, Sing: Chapter 1. After failing to chart on the Billboard Hot Country Songs chart, the song was given several electronic dance remixes, and sent to dance radio where it peaked at number 4 on the Hot Dance Club Songs chart in August 2009.

== Background ==
Written by Rodney Crowell, "Sing" is the closing track and title track to Wynonna Judd's album, Sing: Chapter 1. AllMusic critic Thom Jurek reviewed "Sing", giving it praise. Jurek stated, "This final track is a new pop country anthem; it underscores Judd's sheer individualism and style, and offers a complete illustration of her gifts as a singer."

== Remixes ==
- "Sing (Pete Hammond radio edit)" - 3:41
- "Sing (Pete Hammond extended mix)" - 8:12
- "Sing (Jody den Broeder radio edit)" - 4:19
- "Sing (Jody den Broeder extended mix)" - 6:41
- "Sing (Digital Dog radio edit)" - 2:49
- "Sing (Digital Dog extended mix)" - 6:38
- "Sing (Almighty extended mix)" - 6:35

== Chart performance ==
Shortly after it was released to country radio, the song was remixed for dance airplay. The song reached the Top 5 on the Billboard Hot Dance Club Songs chart in August 2009, peaking at number 4. It became her first Top 5 single on any Billboard chart since "To Be Loved by You" reached number one on Hot Country Singles & Tracks in 1996.

Chart (2009)	Peak position
US Dance Club Songs (Billboard)	4
