= Wynonna & the Big Noise =

Studio album by Wynonna Judd
- Released: February 12, 2016
- Genre: Country, Americana, Blues
- Length: 51:00
- Label: Curb
- Producer: Cactus Moser

Wynonna Judd chronology
Love Heals (2010)	Wynonna & the Big Noise (2016)	Recollections (2020)

Singles from Wynonna & the Big Noise
- 1. "Cool Ya'" Released: February 29, 2016

Wynonna & the Big Noise is the eighth solo studio album by American country music singer Wynonna Judd. The album was released on February 12, 2016 via Curb Records. The album is Judd's first full-length studio album of original material since 2003's What the World Needs Now Is Love.

== Track listing ==
No.	Title	Writer(s)	Length
1.	"Ain't No Thing" (featuring Susan Tedeschi)	John Scott Sherrill, Chris Stapleton	4:53
2.	"Cool Ya"	Lisa Carver, Andrew Ripp	3:28
3.	"Things That I Lean On" (featuring Jason Isbell)	Travis Meadows, Daniel Sanders	3:40
4.	"You Make My Heart Beat Too Fast" (featuring Cactus Moser)	Julie Miller	3:32
5.	"Staying in Love"	Raphael Saadiq	4:10
6.	"Keeps Me Alive" (featuring Derek Trucks)	Sarah Siskind	4:11
7.	"Jesus and a Jukebox"	Meadows, Jeremy Spillman, David Tolliver	3:48
8.	"I Can See Everything" (featuring Timothy B. Schmit)	Schmit	5:03
9.	"Something You Can't Live Without"	Moser, David Lee Murphy	5:33
10.	"You Are So Beautiful"	Moser, Ashley Warren	5:02
11.	"Every Ending (Is a New Beginning)"	Doug Johnson, Wynonna Judd, Billy Montana, Moser	3:53
12.	"Choose to Believe"	Charlie White, Kevin Welch	3:47

== Personnel ==
- Wynonna Judd – vocals
- Peter King – keyboards
- Justin Weaver – acoustic guitar, electric guitars
- Tommy Hannum – pedal steel guitar
- Dow Tomlin – bass
- Cactus Moser – drums, percussion, backing vocals
- Tami Olin – triangle
- Keith Sewell – fiddle, backing vocals
- Leslie Richter – backing vocals

== Charts ==
The album debuted at No. 14 on the Top Country Albums chart, selling 3,700 copies in the US in its first week.

Chart (2016)	Peak position
US Billboard 200	162
US Top Country Albums (Billboard)	14
