= A Classic Christmas (Wynonna Judd album) =

Studio album by Wynonna Judd
- Released: October 10, 2006
- Studios: The Blue Room (Nashville, Tennessee); Sound Kitchen (Franklin, Tennessee)
- Genre: Country
- Length: 44:35
- Label: Curb
- Producers: Brent Maher; Don Potter

Wynonna Judd chronology
Her Story: Scenes from a Lifetime (2005)	A Classic Christmas (2006)	Sing: Chapter 1 (2009)

Professional ratings
Review scores
Source	Rating
About.com	5/5 stars
AllMusic	4/5 stars

A Classic Christmas is the first Christmas album from American country music artist Wynonna Judd. It features her renditions of traditional Christmas tunes, and one newly written track, "It's the Messiah". Her version of "Santa Claus Is Coming to Town" and "Winter Wonderland" respectively reached #3 and #18 on the Hot Adult Contemporary Tracks charts in 2006.

== Track listing ==
No.	Title	Writer(s)	Length
1.	"The Christmas Song"	Mel Tormé; Bob Wells	4:19
2.	"Winter Wonderland"	Felix Bernard; Richard B. Smith	4:22
3.	"White Christmas"	Irving Berlin	3:51
4.	"I'll Be Home for Christmas"	Walter Kent	4:02
5.	"Santa Claus Is Coming to Town"	John Frederick Coots; Haven Gillespie	3:18
6.	"Have Yourself a Merry Little Christmas"	Hugh Martin; Ralph Blane	4:17
7.	"Ave Maria"	Franz Schubert	3:52
8.	"O come, O come, Emmanuel"	John Mason Neale	4:20
9.	"O Holy Night"	Adolphe Adam; John Sullivan Dwight	4:15
10.	"Silent Night"	Josef Mohr; Franz Gruber	4:31
11.	"It's the Messiah"	Don Potter	4:05
Total length:			44:22

== Personnel ==
=== Musicians ===
- Wynonna Judd – vocals
- David Huntsinger – acoustic piano
- Steve Nathan – acoustic piano
- Don Potter – guitars
- Craig Nelson – upright bass
- Eddie Bayers – drums
- Paul Leim – drums
- Calvin Smith – French horn
- Bill Woodworth – English horn, oboe
- Cindy Reynolds Wyatt – harp
- Charlie McCoy – harmonica solo (4)
- Vicki Hampton – backing vocals (2)
- Lisa Silver – backing vocals (2), soprano voice solo (8)
- Lisa Cochran – backing vocals (5)
- Mark Ivey – backing vocals (5)
- Marabeth Jordan – backing vocals (5)
- Bergen White – backing vocals (5)
- Elijah Judd – backing vocals (5)
- Grace Judd – backing vocals (5)
- Jenna Maher – backing vocals (5)

The Nashville String Machine

- Bergen White – string arrangements and conductor
- Lori Casteel, Mike Casteel and Eberhard Ramm – music copyists
- Carl Gorodetzky – string contractor
- David Angell, Monisa Angell, Janet Askey, Bruce Christensen, David Davidson, Conni Ellisor, Julia Emahsier, Carl Gorodetzky, Jim Grosjean, Anthony LaMarchina, Cate Myer, Carole Neuen-Rabinowitz, Keith Nicholas, Danny O'Lannerghty, Lynn Peithman, Joel Reist, Sarighani Reist, Pamela Sixfin, Calvin Smith, Julie Tanner, Alan Umstead, Catherine Umstead, Gary Vanosdale, Mary Kathryn Vanosdale and Kristin Wilkinson – string players

Choir

- Lisa Cochran, Travis Cottrell, Vicki Hampton, Mark Ivey, Marabeth Jordan, Shane McConnell, Louis Nunley, Lisa Silver and Kira Small

=== Production ===
- Brent Maher – producer, engineer, mixing
- Don Potter – producer
- Charles Yingling – engineer
- Brian Krause – second engineer
- Hank Williams – mastering at MasterMix (Nashville, Tennessee)
- Crystal Hooper – production coordinator
- Joy Patterson – set designer
- Glenn Sweitzer – art direction, design
- Kristin Barlowe – photography
- Mitch Barry – hair stylist
- Angela Cay Hall – make-up
- Renee Layher – wardrobe stylist
- Kerry Hansen – management
- Tami Olin – management
- Jennifer Witherell – management

== Charts ==
Chart (2006)	Peak Position
U.S. Billboard Top Country Albums	10
U.S. Billboard 200	53
U.S. Billboard Holiday Albums	14
