= The Other Side (Wynonna Judd album) =

Studio album by Wynonna Judd
- Released: October 21, 1997
- Studios: Ocean Way Nashville, Creative Recording, Masterfonics Tracking Room, Emerald Sound Studios, The Work Station, Sound Emporium Studios, The Sound Shop and Quad Studios (Nashville, Tennessee); The Bennett House, The Sound Kitchen, North Beach Studios and Tejas Recorders (Franklin, Tennessee); Pack's Place and Andora Studios (Los Angeles, California)
- Genre: Country
- Length: 46:52
- Labels: Curb; Universal
- Producers: John Berry; Brent Maher; David Pack; Billy Joe Walker, Jr.

Wynonna Judd chronology
Collection (1997)	The Other Side (1997)	New Day Dawning (2000)

Singles from The Other Side
- 1. "When Love Starts Talkin'" Released: September 22, 1997; 2. "Come Some Rainy Day" Released: December 13, 1997; 3. "Always Will" Released: April 13, 1998

Professional ratings
Review scores
Source	Rating
AllMusic	2.5/5 stars
Entertainment Weekly	D

The Other Side is the fourth solo studio album by American country music artist Wynonna Judd, released on October 21, 1997 on Curb Records in association with Universal Records. The album, which was certified gold by the RIAA, produced three chart singles on the Billboard Hot Country Singles and Tracks (now Hot Country Songs) charts: "When Love Starts Talkin'", "Come Some Rainy Day" and "Always Will" reached #13, #14 and #45, respectively. A fourth single, "Love Like That", failed to chart. The album also includes "We Can't Unmake Love", a duet with John Berry, which was also included on Berry's 2000 Greatest Hits album.

== Track listing ==
No.	Title	Writer(s)	Length
1.	"When Love Starts Talkin'"	Brent Maher; Gary Nicholson; Jamie O'Hara	3:08
2.	"The Other Side"	Kevin Welch	3:55
3.	"Love Like That"	Nicholson; Al Anderson; Benmont Tench	3:57
4.	"The Kind of Fool Love Makes"	Brenda Lee; Michael McDonald; Dave Powelson	4:33
5.	"Troubled Heart and a Troubled Mind"	Wynonna Judd; Maher; O'Hara	3:12
6.	"Don't You Throw That Mojo on Me" (featuring Naomi Judd and Kenny Wayne Shepherd)	Mark Selby; Kenny Wayne Shepherd; Tia Sillers	3:27
7.	"Come Some Rainy Day"	Billy Kirsch; Bat McGrath	3:15
8.	"Love's Funny That Way"	Tina Arena; Dean McTaggart; David Tyson	4:46
9.	"The Wyld Unknown"	Cliff Downs; David Pack	3:33
10.	"Why Now"	Downs; Pack; James Newton Howard	4:49
11.	"We Can't Unmake Love" (duet with John Berry)	Will Robinson; Aaron Saine	3:29
12.	"Always Will"	Harry Stinson; John Hadley	4:51
Total length:			46:52

== Personnel ==
=== Musicians ===
- Wynonna Judd – lead vocals
- Matt Rollings – keyboards (2, 12), acoustic piano (3, 9, 10), Wurlitzer electric piano (5), Hammond B3 organ (6, 8), organ (9)
- Bobby Ogdin – keyboards (4)
- Billy Kirsch – acoustic piano (7)
- John Barlow Jarvis – keyboards (11)
- Steuart Smith – electric guitar (1, 2, 4, 5, 7, 8, 12), electric slide guitar (3), acoustic guitar (4, 12)
- Biff Watson – acoustic guitar (1–9, 12)
- Kenny Greenberg – electric guitar (3), dobro (3, 6)
- Kenny Wayne Shepherd – electric guitar (6)
- Dann Huff – acoustic guitar (9), electric guitar (9, 10), electric guitar solo (10)
- David Pack – acoustic guitar (9), two part harmony vocals (10)
- Tom Hemby – 12-string guitars (10)
- Larry Byrom – acoustic guitar (11)
- Brent Mason – electric guitar (11)
- Al Perkins – lap steel guitar and solos (9)
- Bruce Bouton – pedal steel guitar (9, 10)
- Paul Franklin – steel guitar (11)
- Willie Weeks – bass (1–10)
- Michael Rhodes – bass (11, 12)
- Eddie Bayers – drums (1–5, 7–12), percussion (2), foot stomp (6), leg slap (6)
- Tom Roady – percussion (1–3, 7)
- Terry McMillan – percussion (9, 10), washboard (9), screams (9)
- Aubrey Haynie – fiddle (11)
- Tammy Rogers – fiddle (12)
- Hunter Lee – Uilleann pipes (12)
- Bergen White – string arrangements (7)
- Carl Gorodetzky – string conductor (7)
- The Nashville String Machine – strings (7)
- Bob Bailey – backing vocals (1, 2, 4, 8, 12)
- Vicki Hampton – backing vocals (1–4, 8, 12), harmony vocals (9)
- Kim Fleming – backing vocals (2–4, 12)
- Brent Maher – backing vocals (5)
- Jack Sundrud – backing vocals (5)
- Naomi Judd – guest harmony vocal (6)
- Lisa Bevill – harmony vocals (10)
- Chris Rodriguez – harmony vocals (10)
- Nicol Smith – harmony vocals (10)
- John Berry – lead vocals (11)

Handclaps on "The Wyld Unknown"

- Cliff Downs
- Bridgett Evans O'Lannerghty
- Michael Omartian

=== Production ===
- Brent Maher – producer (1–8, 12)
- David Pack – producer (9, 10)
- John Berry – producer (11)
- Billy Joe Walker Jr. – producer (11)
- Jan Greenfield – project coordinator (1–8, 12)
- Bridgett O'Lannerghty – project coordinator (9, 10)
- Ginny Johnson – project coordinator (11)
- Virginia Team – art direction
- Team Design – design
- Davis Factor – photography
- Kithe Brewster – stylist
- Claudia Fowler – stylist
- Eric Barnard – hair, make-up
- Larry Strickland – management

Technical credits

- Denny Purcell – mastering
- Don Cobb – digital editing
- Carlos Grier – digital editing
- Georgetown Masters (Nashville, Tennessee) – editing and mastering location
- Brent Maher – engineer (1–8, 12)
- John Guess – mixing (1–8, 12)
- Justin Niebank – engineer (9, 10)
- Steve Bishir – overdub engineer (9, 10)
- Dave Dillbeck – overdub engineer (9, 10)
- Jim Dineen – overdub engineer (9, 10)
- Brian Haehnel – overdub engineer (9, 10)
- Terry Nelson – overdub engineer (9, 10)
- David Thoener – overdub engineer (9, 10)
- Terry Christian – mixing (9, 10)
- Ron Reynolds – mixing (9)
- Chuck Ainlay – mixing (10)
- Steve Tillisch – track recording (11), vocal recording (11)
- Ed Seay – mixing (11), vocal recording assistant (11)
- Mills Logan – additional engineer (1–8, 12), assistant engineer (1–8, 12)
- Marty Williams – additional engineer (1–8, 12)
- Philip Scoggins – assistant engineer (1–8, 12)
- Paul Skaife – assistant engineer (1–8, 12)
- Brian Hardin – tracking assistant (11), vocal recording assistant (11)
- Christopher Rowe – mix assistant (1–8, 12)
- Tim Coyle – mix assistant (9, 10)
- Mark Ralston – mix assistant (9, 10)
- Dean Jamison – mix assistant (11)

== Charts ==
=== Weekly charts ===
Chart (1997)	Peak position
Canadian Country Albums (RPM)	17
US Billboard 200	38
US Top Country Albums (Billboard)	5

=== Year-end charts ===
Chart (1998)	Position
US Top Country Albums (Billboard)	38
