= When Love Starts Talkin' =

Single by Wynonna Judd

from the album The Other Side
- B-side: "The Other Side"
- Released: September 22, 1997
- Genre: Country
- Label: Universal; Curb
- Songwriters: Jamie O'Hara; Brent Maher; Gary Nicholson
- Producer: Brent Maher

Wynonna Judd singles chronology
"Somebody to Love You" (1997)	"When Love Starts Talkin'" (1997)	"Come Some Rainy Day" (1998)

"When Love Starts Talkin'" is a song recorded by American country music artist Wynonna Judd. It was released in September 1997 as the first single from the album The Other Side. The song reached number 13 on the Billboard Hot Country Singles & Tracks chart and peaked at number 6 on the RPM Country Tracks chart in Canada. It was written by Jamie O'Hara, Brent Maher, and Gary Nicholson.

== Music video ==
The music video was directed by Bobby Roth and premiered in September 1997.

== Chart performance ==
"When Love Starts Talkin'" debuted at number 53 on the U.S. Billboard Hot Country Singles & Tracks for the week of October 4, 1997.

Chart (1997)	Peak position
Canada Country Singles (RPM)	6
US Billboard Hot 100	98
US Hot Country Songs (Billboard)	13
