= Girls with Guitars =

1994 single by Wynonna Judd

Single by Wynonna Judd

from the album Tell Me Why
- B-side: "I Just Drove By"
- Released: June 4, 1994
- Genre: Country rock
- Length: 3:18
- Label: MCA/Curb
- Songwriter: Mary Chapin Carpenter
- Producer: Tony Brown

Wynonna Judd singles chronology
"Rock Bottom" (1994)	"Girls with Guitars" (1994)	"To Be Loved by You" (1995)

"Girls with Guitars" is a song written by Mary Chapin Carpenter, and recorded by American country music artist Wynonna Judd. It was released in June 1994 as the fifth single from the album Tell Me Why. The song reached number 10 on the Billboard Hot Country Singles & Tracks chart. Judd's mother, Naomi Judd, and Lyle Lovett sing background vocals on the song.

== Content ==
The song is about a young woman who pursues her desire to become a rock musician (particularly as a guitarist), despite her parents assuming more practical roles for her.

The second and third choruses begin with a reference of the famous guitar riffs of Deep Purple's "Smoke on the Water" and Cream's "Sunshine of Your Love," respectively.

== Chart performance ==
Chart (1994)	Peak position
Canada Country Singles (RPM)	9
US Hot Country Songs (Billboard)	10
