= New Day Dawning (Wynonna Judd album) =

Studio album by Wynonna Judd
- Released: February 1, 2000
- Studios: Compass Point Studios (Nassau, Bahamas); Emerald Sound Studios, Loud Recording, Masterfonics, Sound Stage Studios and East Iris Studios (Nashville, Tennessee); The Sound Kitchen and Dark Horse Recording Studios (Franklin, Tennessee)
- Genre: Country
- Length: 1:02:18
- Labels: Curb, Mercury
- Producers: Tony Brown; Wynonna Judd; Gary Nicholson; James Stroud

Wynonna Judd chronology
The Other Side (1997)	New Day Dawning (2000)	What the World Needs Now Is Love (2003)

Singles from New Day Dawning
- 1. "Can't Nobody Love You (Like I Do)" Released: November 13, 1999; 2. "Going Nowhere" Released: 2000

Professional ratings
Review scores
Source	Rating
Allmusic	link
Entertainment Weekly	B link
Q	link

New Day Dawning is the fifth solo studio album by American country music artist Wynonna Judd, released in 2000. It produced only two chart singles on the Billboard Hot Country Singles and Tracks (now Hot Country Songs) charts: "Can't Nobody Love You (Like I Do)" at #31, and "Going Nowhere" at #43. Also included are cover versions of Joni Mitchell's "Help Me" and the Fabulous Thunderbirds' "Tuff Enuff".

Initial presses of the album included a bonus EP called Big Bang Boogie. This four-song EP reunited Wynonna with her mother, Naomi Judd, with whom Wynonna recorded as the Judds in the 1980s and early 1990s before going solo in 1991. All four songs on the EP are credited to the Judds. Of these, "Stuck in Love" was released as a single, charting at #26 on the country charts in 2000 and producing the Judds' first chart single in nearly a decade.

== Track listing ==
=== New Day Dawning ===
1. "Going Nowhere" (Paul Begaud, Vanessa Corish, Kye Fleming) – 4:09
2. "New Day Dawning" (Judson Spence) – 3:35
3. "Can't Nobody Love You (Like I Do)" (Cathy Majeski, Danny Orton) – 3:18
4. "Chain Reaction" (Gary Nicholson, Kenny Greenberg) – 4:15
5. "Help Me" (Joni Mitchell) – 3:30
6. "I've Got Your Love" (Leonard Albstrom, Mark Anderson, Buck Moore) – 3:50
7. "Tuff Enuff" (Kim Wilson) – 4:10
8. "Who Am I Trying to Fool" (Rob Mathes) – 4:34
9. "Lost Without You" (Tina Arena, David Tyson, Christopher Ward) – 3:29
10. "He Rocks" (Tracy Hagans, Ted Hewitt, Troy Seals) – 2:45
11. "Learning to Live with Love Again" (Nicholson, Mike Reid) – 4:03
12. "I Can't Wait to Meet You" (Macy Gray, Jeremy Ruzumna, Daryle Swann, Miles Tackett) – 4:55

=== Big Bang Boogie ===
1. "Stuck in Love" (Kim Patton-Johnston, Nicholson) – 3:48
2. "Big Bang Boogie" (Naomi Judd, Nicholson) – 3:10
3. "That's What Makes You Strong" (Jesse Winchester) – 4:20
4. "The 90's Was the 60's Turned Upside Down" (Marshall Chapman, Nicholson) – 4:25

== Personnel ==
=== New Day Dawning ===
- Wynonna Judd – lead vocals
- John Hobbs – keyboards (1–7, 9–11), organ (1–7, 9–11)
- Steve Nathan – keyboards (1–7, 9, 10), organ (1–7, 9, 10)
- Matt Rollings – keyboards (1–7, 9, 10), acoustic piano (1–7, 9, 10), organ (1–7, 9, 10)
- Tony Harrell – keyboards (8, 12), organ (8, 12)
- Rob Mathes – keyboards (8, 12), synthesizers (8, 12), string arrangements (8, 12)
- John Barlow Jarvis – acoustic piano (8, 12)
- Steuart Smith – electric guitar
- Jerry McPherson – electric guitar (1, 3–7, 9, 10)
- Biff Watson – acoustic guitar (1–7, 9–11)
- Richard Bennett – acoustic guitar (8), electric guitar (11)
- Paul Franklin – steel guitar (1, 3–7, 9, 10)
- Willie Weeks – bass
- John Robinson – drums (1–7, 9–11)
- Steve Potts – drums (8, 12)
- Terry McMillan – percussion (1, 3–7, 9, 10)
- Eric Darken – percussion (2, 8)
- Aubrey Haynie – fiddle (1–7, 9–11)
- Kim Wilson – harmonica (7)
- Mark Douthit – flute (5), alto saxophone (5), baritone saxophone (5)
- Jim Horn – tenor saxophone (12), baritone saxophone (12)
- Barry Green – trombone (12)
- Mike Haynes – trumpet (12)
- Carl Gorodetzky – string conductor (8, 12)
- The Nashville String Machine – strings (8, 12)
- Bob Bailey – backing vocals
- Tabitha Fair – backing vocals
- Kim Fleming – backing vocals
- Vicki Hampton – backing vocals
- Kim Keyes – backing vocals
- Judson Spence – backing vocals

=== Big Bang Boogie ===
- Wynonna Judd – vocals
- Naomi Judd – vocals
- John Barlow Jarvis – acoustic piano, Wurlitzer electric piano
- Tony Harrell – keyboards, synthesizers, organ
- Steve Nathan – keyboards, organ
- Richard Bennett – acoustic guitar, electric guitar
- Jerry McPherson – electric guitar
- Bruce Bouton – lap steel guitar, steel guitar
- Aubrey Haynie – mandolin, fiddle
- Carl Marsh – sitar
- Willie Weeks – bass
- Glenn Worf – upright bass
- Eddie Bayers – drums
- Eric Darken – percussion
- Jim Horn – baritone saxophone, soprano saxophone, tenor saxophone
- Barry Green – trombone
- Mike Haynes – trumpet
- Rob Mathes – string arrangements
- Carl Gorodetzky – string conductor
- The Nashville String Machine – strings
- Bob Bailey – backing vocals
- Kim Fleming – backing vocals
- Vicki Hampton – backing vocals

== Production ==
=== New Day Dawning ===
- Wynonna – producer
- James Stroud – producer (1, 3–7, 9, 10)
- Tony Brown – producer (2, 11)
- Gary Nicholson – producer (8, 12)
- Julian King – recording (1, 3–6, 10)
- Ed Cherney – mixing (1, 4, 6–9, 10, 12)
- Jeff Balding – recording (2, 7–9, 11, 12), additional recording (8, 12)
- Chuck Ainlay – mixing (2, 7, 9, 11)
- Ronnie Brookshire – string recording (8, 12)
- Rich Hansen – additional recording (1, 3–6, 10), recording assistant (1, 3–6, 10)
- Derek Bason – additional recording (8, 12)
- Dan Rudin – additional recording (8, 12)
- Ricky Cobble – recording assistant (1, 3–6, 10)
- Kevin Syzmanski – mix assistant (1, 4, 6–9, 10, 12)
- Mark Hagen – recording assistant (2, 7–9, 11, 12), additional recording (8, 12)
- Greg Fowler – recording assistant (7, 9)
- Tony Green – mix assistant (7, 9)
- Jed Hackett – recording assistant (8, 12)
- Matt "Mat5T" Weeks – recording assistant (8, 12), mix assistant (8, 12)
- John Saylor – string recording assistant (8, 12)
- Eric Conn – digital editing (8, 12)
- Carlos Grier – digital editing (8, 12)
- Denny Purcell – mastering at Georgetown Masters (Nashville, Tennessee)
- Jonathan Russell – mastering assistant (8, 12)
- Claudia Mize – A&R administrative director
- Marla Burns – production coordinator (1, 3–7, 9, 10)
- Tammy Luker – production coordinator (1, 3–7, 9, 10)
- Doug Rich – production coordinator (1, 3–7, 9, 10)
- Jessie Noble – production coordination (2, 11)
- Nathan Nicholson – production coordinator (8, 12)
- Pam Matthews – art direction
- Chris Ferrara – design
- Randee St. Nicholas – photography
- Danny Flynn – stylist
- Robert Vetica – hair
- Kathy Highland – hair, make-up
- Troy Jensen – make-up
- Wynonna, Inc. – management

=== Big Bang Boogie ===
- Gary Nicholson – producer
- Jeff Balding – recording, additional recording
- Ed Cherney – mixing
- Derek Bason – additional recording
- Mark Hagen – additional recording, recording assistant
- Dan Rudin – additional recording
- Jed Hackett – recording assistant
- Kevin Syzmanski – mix assistant
- Matt "Mat5T" Weeks – recording assistant, mix assistant
- Eric Conn – digital editing
- Carlos Grier – digital editing
- Denny Purcell – mastering at Georgetown Masters (Nashville, Tennessee)
- Jonathan Russell – mastering assistant
- Claudia Mize – A&R administrative director
- Nathan Nicholson – production coordinator
- Pam Matthews – art direction, stylist
- Chris Ferrara – design
- Randee St. Nicholas – photography
- Michelle Bregor – stylist
- Kathy Highland – hair, make-up
- Marina Tarpin – make-up
- Victor Vidal – hair
- J2K, Inc. – management

== Charts ==
Chart (2000)	Peak position
U.S. Billboard Top Country Albums	5
U.S. Billboard 200	40
Canadian Country Albums Chart	6
