= Rock Bottom (Wynonna Judd song) =

- Cassette single cover art

Single by Wynonna Judd

from the album Tell Me Why
- B-side: "Girls with Guitars"
- Released: February 19, 1994
- Genre: Country
- Length: 3:07
- Label: MCA; Curb
- Songwriters: J.R. Cobb; Buddy Buie
- Producer: Tony Brown

Wynonna Judd singles chronology
"Is It Over Yet" (1993)	"Rock Bottom" (1994)	"Girls with Guitars" (1994)

"Rock Bottom" is a song written by J.R. Cobb and Buddy Buie, and recorded by American country music artist Wynonna Judd. It was released in February 1994 as the fourth single from the album Tell Me Why. The song reached #2 on the Billboard Hot Country Singles & Tracks chart.

== Chart performance ==
Chart (1994)	Peak position
Canada Country Singles (RPM)	5
US Hot Country Songs (Billboard)	2

=== Year-end charts ===
Chart (1994)	Position
US Country Songs (Billboard)	39
