= Holly Lamar =

American country music singer-songwriter (born 1966)

- Origin: Atlanta, Georgia
- Genres: Country
- Occupation: Singer-songwriter
- Label: Universal South

Mary "Holly" Holladay Lamar (born 1966 in Atlanta, Georgia) is an American country music singer-songwriter. Lamar co-wrote "Breathe", a number one country and adult contemporary single by Faith Hill. Her songs have also been recorded by Sara Evans, Wynonna Judd, Lonestar, Tim McGraw, Jo Dee Messina, Ilse DeLange and Jessica Simpson, among others.

In 2002, Lamar was one of the first artists signed to Universal South. Between 2002 and 2003, she had two singles on the Billboard Hot Country Singles & Tracks chart. The first, "These Are the Days", was previously recorded by Jo Dee Messina on her 2000 album Burn. Deborah Evans Price of Billboard gave Lamar's version of the song a favorable review, calling it "a solid song and a great performance that adds up to a promising debut from a new voice with a lot to say". Her second single, "Unkissed", also received a positive review from Price, who described it as "a shining calling card for a songwriter looking to make her own mark".

== Personal life ==
Lamar appeared on the BBC daytime TV show Homes Under the Hammer, first broadcast in 2012. She bought a house at auction in the Fulham area of London.

In 2014, Lamar lost US$600,000 in a fake investment scam by David Plate, which, she said, left her "on the brink of bankruptcy". He was imprisoned for fraud.

In October 2018, Lamar pleaded guilty in England to two offences relating to the illegal possession of a wild and unregistered peregrine falcon and received an 18-week sentence for each, suspended for 12 months, as well as being sentenced to 120 hours of community service. She was also banned from owning or being in possession of any birds classed as "Schedule 4" of the Wildlife and Countryside Act 1981 which are birds that must be registered and ringed if kept in captivity.

In 2022, after setting up a licensed falconry school Wing Blade Falconry LLC in the United States, Tennessee Wildlife Resources Agency confiscated 13 birds from her possession and charged her with 30 misdemeanors. A court order declared the search warrant, seizure, and charges to be an egregious abuse of the law and invalid and the birds were returned to Lamar’s possession only after one of her birds died in the state's possession. She subsequently sued the officers in federal court for malicious prosecution and the state settled the lawsuit with her.

Her company provides outdoors experiences in Nashville. She continues to write music professionally.

== Discography ==
=== Singles ===
Year	Single	Peak positions	Album
Year	Single	US Country	Album
2002	"These Are the Days"	51	Unkissed (unreleased)
2003	"Unkissed"	59	Unkissed (unreleased)

=== Music videos ===
Year	Video	Director
2002	"These Are the Days"	Steven Goldmann

=== Singles written by Lamar ===
Year	Single	Artist
1999	"Breathe"	Faith Hill
2000	"To Get to You"	Lorrie Morgan
2000	"That's the Way"	Jo Dee Messina
2001	"To Quote Shakespeare"	The Clark Family Experience
2002	"Unbroken"	Tim McGraw
2003	"What the World Needs"	Wynonna Judd
