= Tell Me Why (Wynonna Judd album) =

Studio album by Wynonna Judd
- Released: May 11, 1993
- Studios: Emerald Sound Studios, Backstage Studio, Javelina Recording Studios and Ocean Way Nashville (Nashville, Tennessee)
- Genre: Country
- Length: 38:03
- Labels: Curb; MCA
- Producer: Tony Brown

Wynonna Judd chronology
Wynonna (1992)	Tell Me Why (1993)	Revelations (1996)

Singles from Tell Me Why
- 1. "Tell Me Why" Released: April 3, 1993; 2. "Only Love" Released: July 17, 1993; 3. "Is It Over Yet" Released: October 30, 1993; 4. "Rock Bottom" Released: February 19, 1994; 5. "Girls with Guitars" Released: June 4, 1994

Professional ratings
Review scores
Source	Rating
AllMusic	4.5/5 stars
Entertainment Weekly	A
Los Angeles Times	3/4 stars
Robert Christgau	(2-star Honorable Mention)
Rolling Stone	3.5/5 stars
Orlando Sentinel	Favorable

Tell Me Why is the second studio album by American country music artist Wynonna Judd, released via Curb and MCA Records on May 11, 1993. Receiving positive reviews from music critics, it has been certified Platinum by the RIAA for shipments of 1,000,000 units.

Five official singles were released, all of which cracked the top ten of the US Billboard Hot Country Songs chart, with "Only Love" topping the Radio & Records country airplay chart. The song "Let's Make a Baby King" also peaked at number 61 due to unsolicited airplay.

== Track listing ==
Tell Me Why
No.	Title	Writer(s)	Length
1.	"Tell Me Why"	Karla Bonoff	3:50
2.	"Rock Bottom"	Buddy Buie; J. R. Cobb	3:07
3.	"Only Love"	Roger Murrah; Marcus Hummon	3:35
4.	"Let's Make a Baby King"	Jesse Winchester	3:33
5.	"Is It Over Yet"	Billy Kirsch	3:48
6.	"Father Sun"	Sheryl Crow; Jay Oliver	4:19
7.	"Girls with Guitars"	Mary Chapin Carpenter	3:18
8.	"Just Like New"	Winchester	2:51
9.	"I Just Drove By"	Kimmie Rhodes	3:58
10.	"That Was Yesterday"	Naomi Judd	5:37
Total length:			38:03

== Personnel ==
- Wynonna Judd – lead vocals, backing vocals (3)
- Steve Nathan – acoustic piano (1), Wurlitzer electric piano (4, 7–10), Hammond B3 organ (6)
- Matt Rollings – acoustic piano (6), Hammond B3 organ (1, 4, 8), Wurlitzer electric piano (2, 10)
- Barry Beckett – Hammond B3 organ (2)
- Billy Kirsch – acoustic piano (5)
- Karla Bonoff – acoustic guitar (1), backing vocals (1)
- Don Potter – acoustic guitar (1, 3, 6, 7, 9), electric guitar (4, 8, 10), rhythm guitar (4, 8)
- Steuart Smith – acoustic guitar (7, 9), electric guitar (2–4, 6–8, 10), lead guitar (1, 4, 8, 10), rhythm guitar (1)
- Steve Cropper – electric guitar (2)
- Marcus Hummon – acoustic guitar (3)
- Paul Franklin – steel guitar (9)
- Willie Weeks – bass (1–4, 6–10)
- Eddie Bayers – drums (1–4, 6–10), percussion (6)
- Terry McMillan – cowbell (1), tambourine (1), harmonica (9)
- Jim Horn – saxophones (4)
- Harvey Thompson – saxophones (4)
- George Tidwell – trumpets (4)
- Steve Dorff – string arrangements and conductor (3, 5)
- Kenny Edwards – backing vocals (1)
- Wendy Waldman – backing vocals (1)
- Bob Bailey – backing vocals (2, 4, 6)
- Kim Fleming – backing vocals (2, 4, 6)
- Suzy Willis – backing vocals (2, 4, 6)
- Chris Rodriguez – backing vocals (3, 6)
- Naomi Judd – backing vocals (7, 8)
- Lyle Lovett – backing vocals (7)
- Jesse Winchester – backing vocals (8)

Production

- Tony Brown – producer
- Don Potter – associate producer
- Chuck Ainlay – recording, mixing, mastering, overdub recording (2–10)
- Clark Germain – overdub recording (1)
- Russ Martin – overdub recording (2–10)
- Warren Peterson – overdub recording (2–10)
- Robert Fernandez – string recording (3, 5) at Warner Bros. Scoring Stage 1 (Los Angeles, California)
- Jim Champange – overdub assistant (1)
- Graham Lewis – second engineer
- Nick Sparks – second engineer
- Robert Charles – second engineer (7)
- Larry Jefferies – second engineer (7)
- Craig White – second engineer (7)
- Denny Purcell – mastering
- Masterfonics (Nashville, Tennessee) – mixing location
- Georgetown Masters (Nashville, Tennessee) – mastering location
- Jessie Noble – project coordinator
- Virginia Team – art direction
- Jerry Joyner – design
- Randee St. Nicholas – photography
- Earl Cox/Trumps – hair
- Mary Beth Felts – make-up
- Vanessa Ware – stylist
- Ken Stilts Company, Inc. – management

== Charts ==
=== Weekly charts ===
Weekly chart performance for Tell Me Why
Chart (1993)	Peak position
Canada Top Albums/CDs (RPM)	29
Canadian Country Albums (RPM)	2
Dutch Albums (Album Top 100)	64
US Billboard 200	5
US Top Country Albums (Billboard)	1

=== Year-end charts ===
1993 year-end chart performance for Tell Me Why
Chart (1993)	Peak position
Canadian Country Albums (RPM)	8
US Billboard 200	80
US Top Country Albums (Billboard)	17

1994 year-end chart performance for Tell Me Why
Chart (1994)	Peak position
US Top Country Albums (Billboard)	20

== Certifications ==
Region	Certification	Certified units/sales
Canada (Music Canada)	Platinum	100,000^{^}
United States (RIAA)	Platinum	1,000,000^{^}
^{^} Shipments figures based on certification alone.
