= Revelations (Wynonna Judd album) =

Studio album by Wynonna Judd
- Released: February 13, 1996
- Studios: Emerald Sound Studios, Javelina Studios, Sound Stage Studios and The Tracking Room (Nashville, Tennessee); The Bennett House (Franklin, Tennessee); Quarkbrain Studios (Sherman Oaks, California)
- Genre: Country
- Length: 49:45
- Label: Curb / MCA
- Producer: Tony Brown

Wynonna Judd chronology
Tell Me Why (1993)	Revelations (1996)	Collection (1997)

Singles from Revelations
- 1. "To Be Loved by You" Released: January 6, 1996; 2. "Heaven Help My Heart" Released: April 27, 1996; 3. "My Angel Is Here" Released: August 19, 1996; 4. "Somebody to Love You" Released: November 4, 1996

Professional ratings
Review scores
Source	Rating
Allmusic	4/5 stars
Chicago Tribune	3/4 stars

Revelations is the third solo studio album by American country music artist Wynonna Judd, released in 1996 on MCA Records in association with Curb Records. It was her first album since Tell Me Why three years previous. The album's lead-off single, "To Be Loved by You", was her fourth and most recent to date #1 on the Billboard Hot Country Songs charts. The second single, "Heaven Help My Heart", peaked at No. 14 on the same chart, while "My Angel Is Here" and "Somebody to Love You" both missed the top 40, becoming the first two singles of her career to do so. The album itself peaked at No. 2 on the Top Country Albums charts and #9 on The Billboard 200, and was certified platinum by the RIAA.

The track "Free Bird" is a cover of the Lynyrd Skynyrd song, and was previously included on the 1994 tribute album Skynyrd Frynds.

== Track listing ==
Revelations
No.	Title	Writer(s)	Length
1.	"To Be Loved by You"	Gary Burr; Mike Reid	4:50
2.	"Somebody to Love You"	Gary Nicholson; Delbert McClinton	4:51
3.	"Change the World"	Gordon Kennedy; Tommy Sims; Wayne Kirkpatrick	3:16
4.	"Don't Look Back"	Tonio K.; John Keller	5:08
5.	"Old Enough to Know Better"	Jeff Silbar; Glen Clark	4:15
6.	"Heaven Help My Heart"	David Tyson; Tina Arena; Dean McTaggart	6:06
7.	"Love by Grace"	Dave Loggins; Wayne Tester	4:12
8.	"Free Bird"	Allen Collins; Ronnie Van Zant	7:42
9.	"My Angel Is Here"	Lulu; Billy Lawrie; Mark Stephen Cawley	5:00
10.	"Dance! Shout!"	Gary Oliver	4:07
Total length:			49:45

== Personnel ==
- Wynonna Judd – vocals
- Steve Nathan – synthesizers (1, 9), Hammond B3 organ (2, 5, 6), synth strings (3, 4, 6), acoustic piano (4, 8, 9)
- Matt Rollings – electric piano (1, 4), acoustic piano (2, 6, 7), Wurlitzer electric piano (5), Hammond B3 organ (8, 10)
- Don Potter – acoustic guitar (1–6, 8, 9), electric guitar (10)
- Steuart Smith – electric guitar (1, 2, 5–8, 10), acoustic guitar (3), acoustic slide guitar (4)
- Dann Huff – electric guitar (2, 3, 5, 8, 9), gut-string electric guitar (7)
- Paul Franklin – steel guitar (4)
- Willie Weeks – bass (1–6, 8–10)
- Eddie Bayers – drums (1–6, 8–10)
- Tom Roady – percussion (4, 5, 6)
- Terry McMillan – harmonica (5)
- Jim Horn – baritone saxophone (5), saxophones (10)
- Roger "Rock" Williams – tenor saxophone (5)
- Jim Hoke – saxophones (10)
- Barry Green – trombone (10)
- "Hollywood" Paul Litteral – trumpet (5)
- Mike Haynes – trumpet (10)
- Steve Dorff – string arrangements (3, 7)
- The Nashville String Machine – strings (3, 7)
- Bob Bailey – backing vocals (1, 4, 5, 8–10)
- Kim Fleming – backing vocals (1, 4, 5, 8–10)
- Vicki Hampton – backing vocals (1, 4, 5, 9, 10)
- Jonell Mosser – backing vocals (2)
- Gordon Kennedy – backing vocals (3)
- Max Carl – backing vocals (4)
- Andrew Gold – backing vocals (6)
- Suzy Wills – backing vocals (8)
- Willie Greene Jr. – backing vocals (10)
- The Born Again Minstrels Church Choir – additional backing vocals (10)

=== Production ===
- Tony Brown – producer
- Don Potter – associate producer
- Chuck Ainlay – mixing, mastering, engineer (1–8), overdubs (1–8)
- Terry Christian – overdubs (3), string overdubs (7)
- Justin Niebank – overdubs (8, 10)
- Jeff Balding – engineer (9, 10), overdubs (9)
- Graham Lewis – second engineer (1–8), second mix engineer (9, 10)
- Robert Charles – second engineer (2, 3, 7, 8)
- Joe Hayden – second overdub engineer (3, 7)
- King Williams – second overdub engineer (3, 7)
- Craig White – second engineer (8)
- Chris Davis – second engineer (9, 10)
- Denny Purcell – mastering
- Georgetown Masters (Nashville, Tennessee) – mastering location
- Jessie Noble – project coordinator
- John Coulter – art direction, design
- Randee St. Nicholas – photography
- Nancy Ogami – Wynonna calligraphy
- Roni Burks – stylist
- Eric Barnard – hair, make-up
- John Unger – management

== Charts ==
=== Weekly charts ===
Weekly chart performance for Revelations
Chart (1996)	Peak position
Canada Top Albums/CDs (RPM)	33
Canadian Country Albums (RPM)	1
US Billboard 200	9
US Top Country Albums (Billboard)	2

=== Year-end charts ===
1996 year-end chart performance for Revelations
Chart (1996)	Position
Canadian Country Albums (RPM)	12
US Billboard 200	107
US Top Country Albums (Billboard)	14

== Certifications ==
Region	Certification	Certified units/sales
Canada (Music Canada)	Gold	50,000^{^}
United States (RIAA)	Platinum	1,000,000^{^}
^{^} Shipments figures based on certification alone.
