= Only Love (Wynonna Judd song) =

Single by Wynonna Judd

from the album Tell Me Why
- B-side: "Just Like New"
- Released: July 17, 1993
- Recorded: 1992
- Genre: Country
- Length: 3:35
- Label: MCA; Curb
- Songwriters: Roger Murrah; Marcus Hummon
- Producer: Tony Brown

Wynonna Judd singles chronology
"A Bad Goodbye" (1993)	"Only Love" (1993)	"Is It Over Yet" (1993)

"Only Love" is a song written by Roger Murrah and Marcus Hummon, and recorded by American country music artist Wynonna Judd. It was released in July 1993 as the second single from the album Tell Me Why. The song reached number 3 on the Billboard Hot Country Singles & Tracks chart.

== Chart performance ==
Chart (1993)	Peak position
Canada Country Singles (RPM)	3
US Bubbling Under Hot 100 (Billboard)	2
US Hot Country Songs (Billboard)	3

=== Year-end charts ===
Chart (1993)	Position
Canada Country Tracks (RPM)	68
US Country Songs (Billboard)	31
