= Come Some Rainy Day =

Single by Wynonna Judd

from the album The Other Side
- Released: December 13, 1997
- Genre: Country
- Length: 3:15
- Label: Universal; Curb
- Songwriters: Billy Kirsch; Bat McGrath
- Producer: Brent Maher

Wynonna Judd singles chronology
"When Love Starts Talkin'" (1997)	"Come Some Rainy Day" (1997)	"Always Will" (1998)

"Come Some Rainy Day" is a song written by Billy Kirsch and Bat McGrath, and recorded by American country music artist Wynonna Judd. It was released in December 1997 as the second single from her album The Other Side. The song reached number 14 on the Billboard Hot Country Singles & Tracks chart in March 1998.

== Chart performance ==
Chart (1997–1998)	Peak position
Canada Country Singles (RPM)	12
US Hot Country Songs (Billboard)	14

=== Year-end charts ===
Chart (1998)	Position
Canada Country Tracks (RPM)	86
US Country Songs (Billboard)	71
