= What the World Needs =

Single by Wynonna Judd

from the album What the World Needs Now Is Love
- Released: May 5, 2003
- Genre: Country
- Length: 3:37
- Label: Asylum/Curb
- Songwriters: Brett James; Holly Lamar
- Producers: Dann Huff; Wynonna Judd

Wynonna Judd singles chronology
"Going Nowhere" (2000)	"What the World Needs" (2003)	"Heaven Help Me" (2003)

"What the World Needs" is a song recorded by American country music artist Wynonna Judd. It was released in May 2003 as the first single from her album What the World Needs Now Is Love. The song was written by Brett James and Holly Lamar.

== Personnel ==
- Wynonna Judd – lead vocals
- Tim Akers – keyboards
- Matt Rollings – keyboards
- Tom Bukovac – electric guitar
- Gordon Kennedy – electric guitar
- John Willis – acoustic guitar, banjo
- Paul Franklin – steel guitar
- Steve Mackey – bass
- Steve Potts – drums
- Jonathan Yudkin – fiddle
- Lisa Cochran – backing vocals
- Chris Rodriguez – backing vocals

== Chart performance ==
"What the World Needs" debuted at number 55 on the U.S. Billboard Hot Country Songs chart for the week of May 10, 2003.

Chart (2003)	Peak position
US Hot Country Songs (Billboard)	14
US Billboard Hot 100	70

=== Year-end charts ===
Chart (2003)	Position
US Country Songs (Billboard)	55
