= What the World Needs Now Is Love (Wynonna Judd album) =

Studio album by Wynonna Judd
- Released: August 5, 2003
- Recorded: November 2000 – 2003
- Studios: Emerald Entertainment, Arrowhead Studios and Ocean Way Nashville (Nashville, Tennessee); The Sound Kitchen (Franklin, Tennessee); Capitol Studios (Hollywood, California); Tarpan Studios (San Rafael, California)
- Genre: Country
- Length: 58:20
- Label: Curb / Asylum
- Producers: Dann Huff; Wynonna Judd; Gordon Kennedy; Wayne Kirkpatrick; Narada Michael Walden

Wynonna Judd chronology
New Day Dawning (2000)	What the World Needs Now Is Love (2003)	Her Story: Scenes from a Lifetime (2005)

Singles from What the World Needs Now Is Love
- 1. "What the World Needs" Released: May 5, 2003; 2. "Heaven Help Me" Released: September 13, 2003; 3. "Flies on the Butter (You Can't Go Home Again)" Released: March 3, 2004; 4. "I Want to Know What Love Is" Released: August 24, 2004; 5. "Rescue Me" Released: August 29, 2005

Professional ratings
Review scores
Source	Rating
Allmusic	4/5 stars
Entertainment Weekly	C
Rolling Stone	3/5 stars

What the World Needs Now Is Love is the sixth solo studio album by American country music artist Wynonna Judd, released in 2003 as her first album for Curb / Asylum Records. It produced four chart singles; the first of these, which was the title track, reached #14 on the Billboard country charts. It was followed by "Heaven Help Me" at #37 and "Flies on the Butter" (a duet with her mother Naomi Judd, one half of The Judds) at #33. The fourth and final single, a cover of Foreigner's "I Want to Know What Love Is", did not enter the country charts, but reached #14 on Hot Adult Contemporary Tracks and #12 on Hot Dance Airplay.

Also covered on this album is Elvis Presley's "Burning Love"; Wynonna's cover was previously included in the soundtrack to the 2002 film Lilo & Stitch. "I Will Be" was cut by Lila McCann on her 1999 album Something in the Air. Additionally, "You Are" was featured in the soundtrack to the 2003 film Someone Like You, which starred Wynonna's half-sister, Ashley Judd. Finally, "Flies on the Butter" was previously recorded by Lari White on her 1998 album Stepping Stone.

== Track listing ==
No.	Title	Writer(s)	Length
1.	"What the World Needs"	Brett James; Holly Lamar	3:37
2.	"Heaven Help Me"	Chuck Cannon; James Dean Hicks	4:02
3.	"It All Comes Down to Love"	Cannon	3:43
4.	"Flies on the Butter (You Can't Go Home Again)" (duet with Naomi Judd)	Cannon; Austin Cunningham; Allen Shamblin	4:30
5.	"I Will Be"	Tanya Leah; Bob Farrell	4:15
6.	"I Want to Know What Love Is"	Mick Jones	5:41
7.	"It's Only Love"	Steve Robson; Wayne Hector	4:17
8.	"Sometimes I Feel Like Elvis"	Bryan White; Neil Thrasher; Derek George	4:43
9.	"Burning Love"	Dennis Linde	3:12
10.	"Who Am I Supposed to Love"	Sarah Nagourney; Chris Rodriguez; Bobby Blazler	4:04
11.	"Your Day Will Come"	Stephony Smith; Jeremy Stover	3:54
12.	"(No One's Gonna) Break Me Down"	Angelo Petraglia; James; Hillary Lindsey	3:16
13.	"You Are"	Wynonna Judd; Wayne Kirkpatrick; Gordon Kennedy	4:54
14.	"Rescue Me"	Kathryn Darnell	4:04
15.	"I Want To Know What Love Is (Piper Remix Edit)" (Bonus track on selected copies)	Mick Jones	3:55
Total length:			62:07

== Personnel ==
=== Musicians ===
- Wynonna Judd – vocals
- Tim Akers – keyboards (1–7, 9, 12, 13), accordion (14)
- Matt Rollings – keyboards (1), acoustic piano (3, 4, 12)
- Steve Nathan – keyboards (2, 5–9, 11)
- Greg Phillinganes – keyboards (10)
- Craig Young – keyboards (13)
- Tom Bukovac – electric guitar (1, 5–9, 11)
- Gordon Kennedy – electric guitar (1, 3, 8, 11, 13)
- John Willis – acoustic guitar (1), banjo (1)
- Dann Huff – electric guitar (2–9, 11, 12), acoustic guitar (14)
- Jerry McPherson – electric guitar (2, 5–7, 9), guitars (10)
- Don Potter – acoustic guitar (2–7, 12, 14)
- Biff Watson – acoustic guitar (3, 4, 12)
- Jeff Beck – lead guitar (6)
- Paul Franklin – steel guitar (1–4, 6, 8, 12, 13)
- Steve Mackey – bass (1)
- Willie Weeks – bass (2, 5–7, 9, 10)
- Jimmie Lee Sloas – bass (3, 4, 6, 7, 12)
- Mike Brignardello – bass (8, 11)
- Glenn Worf – bass (13)
- Steve Potts – drums (1)
- John Robinson – drums (2–8, 11, 12)
- Chris McHugh – drums (9, 13)
- Narada Michael Walden – drums (10)
- Eric Darken – percussion (2, 4–9, 11, 13, 14)
- David Huff – loop programming (2, 5–7)
- Jonathan Yudkin – fiddle (1, 14), mandolin (4, 14), string arrangements (4), cello (4, 14), viola (4), violin (4), harp (14)
- Lisa Cochran – backing vocals (1, 8, 12)
- Chris Rodriguez – backing vocals (1)
- Bob Bailey – backing vocals (2, 3, 5–7, 9, 10, 12–14)
- Kim Fleming – backing vocals (2, 3, 5–7, 9, 10, 12, 14)
- Vicki Hampton – backing vocals (2, 3, 5–7, 9, 10, 12–14)
- Naomi Judd – vocals (4)
- Perry Coleman – backing vocals (8, 11, 12)
- Bekka Bramlett – backing vocals (11)

Strings (Tracks 2 and 6)

- Ronn Huff – string arrangements (2)
- David Campbell – string conductor, string arrangements (6)
- Suzie Katayama – string contractor
- Reggie Hamilton and Oscar Meza Jr. – bass
- Larry Corbett, Paula Hochhalter, Dan Smith and Rudy Stein – cello
- Karen Elaine-Bakunin, John Hayhurst, Carole Mukogawa and Evan Wilson – viola
- Darius Campo, Susan Chatman, Joel Derouin, Charles Everett, Geraldo Hilera, Norman Hughes, Peter Kent, Sara Perkins, Bob Peterson, Michele Richards and John Wittenberg – violin

=== Production ===
- Wynonna Judd – producer, arrangements (1–5, 7, 8, 9, 11, 12, 14), executive producer (13)
- Dann Huff – producer (1–5, 7–9, 11, 12, 14), arrangements (1–5, 7–9, 11, 12, 14), executive producer (13), remixing (13)
- Gordon Kennedy – producer (13)
- Wayne Kirkpatrick – producer (13)
- Narada Michael Walden – producer (6, 10), arrangements (6, 10)
- Jeff Balding – recording (1–3, 5, 7–9, 11–14), mixing (1–5, 7–9, 11, 12, 14)
- Derek Bason – recording (1–3, 5, 7, 8, 11, 12, 14), digital editing (1–5, 7, 8, 11–14)
- Jed Hackett – recording (1–3, 5, 7, 8, 11–14), recording assistant (1–3, 5, 7–9, 11–14), mix assistant (1–3, 5, 7–9, 11–14)
- Mark Hagen – recording (1–5, 7, 8, 11–14), tracking engineer (10)
- Steve Churchyard – string recording (2, 6)
- John Hudson – Jeff Beck's guitar recording (6)
- John Jaszcz – vocal engineer (10)
- David Frazer – mixing (10)
- Jesse Amend – recording assistant (1–3, 5, 7, 8, 11, 12, 14)
- David Bryant – recording assistant (1–3, 5, 7, 8, 11, 12, 14), mix assistant (1–5, 7, 8, 11, 12, 14)
- J.C. Monterrosa – recording assistant (1–3, 5, 7, 8, 11–14)
- Charlie Paakkari – assistant engineer (2, 6)
- Leslie Richter – recording assistant (9), mix assistant (9)
- Grant Green – assistant engineer (10, 14)
- Andrew Leavitt – assistant engineer (10)
- Melissa Mattey – assistant engineer (10)
- Christopher Rowe – digital editing (1–3, 5, 7, 8, 11–14)
- Dino Herrmann – Pro Tools engineer (2, 6)
- Jim Reitzel – Pro Tools engineer (10), mix assistant (10)
- Adam Ayan – mastering at Gateway Mastering (Portland, Maine)
- Mike "Frog" Griffith – production coordinator (1–5, 7–9, 11, 12, 14)
- John Coulter Design – graphic design
- Alan R. Mayor – photography
- Rod Spicer – photography
- Camille – photography
- Gibson Guitars – front cover guitar
- Robert Vertica – hair
- Billy B. – make-up
- Todd Handshaw – stylist
- Kerry Hansen – management

== Charts ==
=== Weekly charts ===
Chart (2003)	Peak position
US Billboard 200	8
US Top Country Albums (Billboard)	1

=== Year-end charts ===
Chart (2003)	Position
US Top Country Albums (Billboard)	48
Chart (2004)	Position
US Top Country Albums (Billboard)	51
