= Is It Over Yet =

Single by Wynonna Judd

from the album Tell Me Why
- B-side: "That Was Yesterday"
- Released: October 30, 1993
- Genre: Country
- Length: 3:48
- Label: MCA/Curb
- Songwriter: Billy Kirsch
- Producer: Tony Brown

Wynonna Judd singles chronology
"Only Love" (1993)	"Is It Over Yet" (1993)	"Rock Bottom" (1994)

"Is It Over Yet" is a song written by Billy Kirsch, and recorded by American country music artist Wynonna Judd. It was released in October 1993 as the third single from the album Tell Me Why. The song reached number six on the Billboard Hot Country Singles & Tracks chart. R&B singer Tamia covered the song for her album Beautiful Surprise (2012).

== Chart performance ==
Chart (1993–1994)	Peak position
Canada Country Singles (RPM)	8
US Hot Country Songs (Billboard)	6
