= To Be Loved by You (Wynonna Judd song) =

Single by Wynonna Judd

from the album Revelations
- B-side: "Free Bird"
- Released: January 6, 1996
- Genre: Country
- Length: 4:50
- Label: MCA; Curb
- Songwriters: Gary Burr; Mike Reid
- Producer: Tony Brown

Wynonna Judd singles chronology
"Girls with Guitars" (1994)	"To Be Loved by You" (1996)	"Heaven Help My Heart" (1996)

"To Be Loved by You" is a song written by Gary Burr and Mike Reid, and recorded by American country music artist Wynonna Judd. It was released in January 1996 as the first single from her album Revelations. The song reached number one on the Billboard Hot Country Singles & Tracks (now Hot Country Songs) chart in April 1996.

== Chart performance ==
Chart (1996)	Peak position
Canada Country Singles (RPM)	3
US Adult Contemporary (Billboard)	25
US Hot Country Songs (Billboard)	1

=== Year-end charts ===
Chart (1996)	Position
Canada Country Tracks (RPM)	33
US Country Songs (Billboard)	21
