= Tell Me Why (Karla Bonoff song) =

Single by Wynonna Judd

from the album Tell Me Why
- B-side: "A Little Bit of Love (Goes a Long, Long Way)"
- Released: April 3, 1993
- Genre: Country
- Length: 3:50
- Label: MCA/Curb
- Songwriter: Karla Bonoff
- Producer: Tony Brown

Wynonna Judd singles chronology
"My Strongest Weakness" (1992)	"Tell Me Why" (1993)	"A Bad Goodbye" (1993)

"Tell Me Why" is a song written and recorded by Karla Bonoff for her 1988 studio album New World. In 1993, the song was covered by American country music artist Wynonna Judd and released in April 1993 as the first single and title track from her album Tell Me Why. The song reached number 3 on the Billboard Hot Country Singles & Tracks chart in May 1993 and number 1 on the RPM Country Tracks chart in Canada the following month.

== Background ==
The song was written by Karla Bonoff and makes its first appearance on her 1988 studio album "New World". It reappears on her 1999 album "All My Life -The Best of Karla Bonoff," and again on her 2007 Live album. The song is about being heartbroken over an old flame. The verses dive into the feeling of still being in love with someone who has moved on; one lyric describes it as "a fool in love with a fool that never cared." The chorus then laments the desire but inability to let go with the lyric, "So won't you tell me why I can't say goodbye."

== Cover ==
In 1993, country music artist Wynonna Judd released the album Tell Me Why, which featured "Tell Me Why" as the title track. Composer Bonoff appears on the track as a guitarist and backing vocalist. The album went on to reach number 1 on U.S. Billboard Top Country Albums.

== Chart performance ==
Chart (1993)	Peak position
Canada Country Singles (RPM)	1
US Billboard Hot 100	77
US Adult Contemporary (Billboard)	24
US Hot Country Songs (Billboard)	3

=== Year-end charts ===
Chart (1993)	Position
Canada Country Tracks (RPM)	5
US Country Songs (Billboard)	27
