= Wynonna Judd =

American country singer (born 1964)

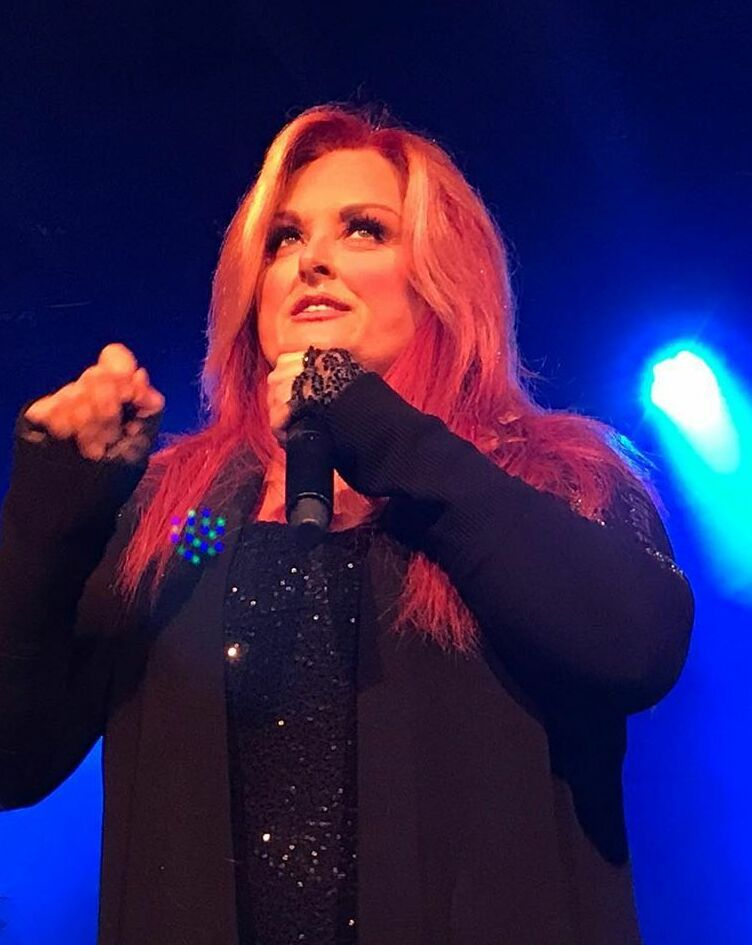
- Judd in concert at The Birchmere in Alexandria, Virginia, 2018
- Born: Christina Claire Ciminella; May 30, 1964 (age 62); Ashland, Kentucky, U.S.
- Other name: Wynonna Judd Moser
- Occupations: Singer; television personality
- Years active: 1979–present
- Spouses: Arch Kelley III (m. 1996; div. 1998); D.R. Roach (m. 2003; div. 2007); Cactus Moser (m. 2012)
- Children: 2
- Mother: Naomi Judd
- Relatives: Ashley Judd (half-sister)
- Musical career
- Genres: Country; blues; country pop; gospel
- Instruments: Vocals; guitar
- Labels: Curb; RCA; MCA; Universal; Mercury; Asylum-Curb; ANTI
- Formerly of: The Judds
- Website: wynonna.com

Wynonna Ellen Judd (/waɪˈnoʊnə/ wy-NOH-nə; born Christina Claire Ciminella; May 30, 1964) is an American country music singer. She is one of the most widely recognized and awarded female country musicians in history. She has had 19 No. 1 singles, including those with The Judds. She first rose to fame in the 1980s alongside her mother, Naomi, in their mother-daughter country music duo, The Judds. They released seven albums on Curb Records, in addition to 26 singles, of which 14 were No. 1 hits, making her one of the biggest selling artists of all time.

The Judds disbanded in 1991, and Wynonna began a solo career (also on Curb). During her solo career, Wynonna has released eight studio albums, as well as a live album, a holiday album, and two compilation albums, with the releasing of more than 20 singles. Her first three singles, "She Is His Only Need", "I Saw the Light", and "No One Else on Earth" all reached No. 1 on the U.S. Billboard Hot Country Songs chart. In 1996, "To Be Loved by You" also hit number one, becoming her fourth number one and top-ten hit. Three of her albums are certified multiple-times platinum by the RIAA. Her most recent recording is Wynonna & the Big Noise, which was released on February 12, 2016, followed by the release of the single "Cool Ya'" that same month. "Recollections" was released in 2020. Wynonna is most recognized for her musical work, although she has also pursued other interests starting in the 2000s, including writing, acting, and philanthropy.

In 2022, Wynonna was inducted into the Country Music Hall of Fame as a member of The Judds.

== Early life ==
Wynonna was born in Ashland, Kentucky northeast of Lexington on May 30, 1964. Her mother, Naomi Judd, (then known as Diana) quickly married Michael Ciminella after being abandoned by Charles Jordan, her boyfriend and Judd's biological father. Jordan died in August 2000.

Naomi Judd and Michael Ciminella had a daughter together whom they named Ashley. The couple moved with the two girls to Los Angeles in 1968, but were divorced by 1972. By 1976, Naomi Judd took the girls with her back to Kentucky. Wynonna was inspired by the country music songs to which her mother listened, and learned to play guitar. In 1979 the family moved to Nashville, so Naomi and Wynonna could pursue musical careers. Then Wynonna's mother legally changed her name from Diana to Naomi, and Christina adopted the stage name "Wynonna" after the song "(Get Your Kicks on) Route 66", which mentions the town of Winona, Arizona, which is east of Flagstaff, in the lyrics.

== The Judds ==
Wynonna and Naomi were signed to RCA Records in 1983 as the duo the Judds. Between 1983 and 1991, the Judds charted 23 hit singles on the Billboard Hot Country Singles (now Hot Country Songs) charts, including 14 number ones. They also recorded eight studio albums, one Christmas album, and two Greatest Hits compilations. In their six-year career, the Judds sold more than 20 million records worldwide and had won over 60 industry awards, including five Grammy Nominations, nine Country Music Association awards (seven of them consecutive), and eight Billboard Music Awards. At the time, they were the biggest-selling duo in country music and remained so until they were eclipsed by Brooks & Dunn in the 1990s. Naomi retired due to chronic hepatitis C after a 1991 farewell tour. After the duo broke up, Wynonna signed to MCA Records in association with Curb Records as a solo artist.

Wynonna reunited with her mother for a 1999 New Year's Eve concert to ring in the year 2000 sponsored by K-Mart. They embarked on a full-fledged tour together in 2000, and four new Judds songs were released on an exclusive bonus disc with Wynonna's album, New Day Dawning. The Judds reunited a second time in 2010 for "The Last Encore", an 18-city tour. Due to excitement for the upcoming tour, Curb Records announced the release of a new album from the Judds, I Will Stand by You: The Essential Collection, which featured two new songs and twelve of the duo's hits. The album was released on April 5, 2011.

== Solo career ==
=== 1992–1998: Breakthrough success ===
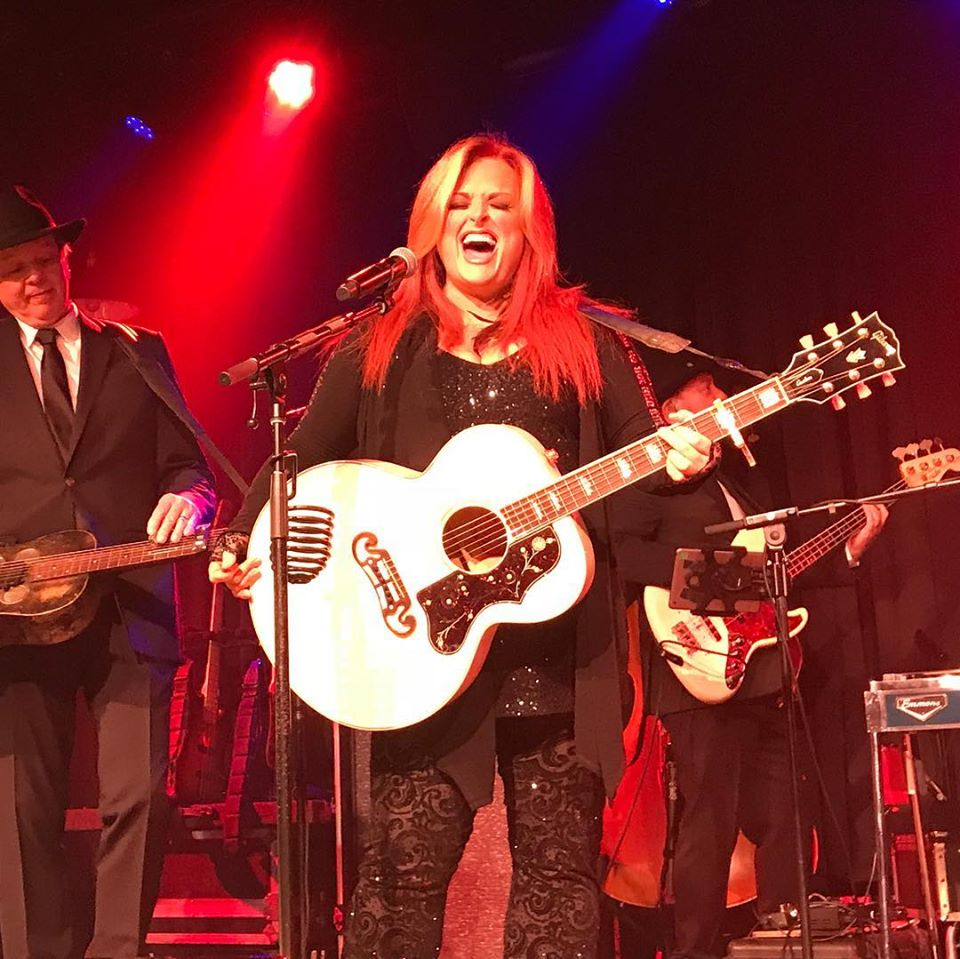
Wynonna and her band, the Big Noise, performs at The Birchmere in Alexandria, Virginia, October 2018

On January 27, 1992, Wynonna performed solo on television for the first time at the American Music Awards. She released "She Is His Only Need", the first single from her self-titled solo debut album. The album, Wynonna, was released in 1992 via MCA/Curb, under the production of Tony Brown. "She Is His Only Need" went to number one on the Billboard country singles charts that year, as did the album's next two singles, "I Saw the Light" and "My Strongest Weakness". "No One Else on Earth", was also the number one country song of 1992 according to Billboard Year-End. "She Is His Only Need" and "No One Else on Earth" were also minor Adult Contemporary hits, and the latter peaked at No. 83 on the Billboard Hot 100. "My Strongest Weakness", the album's final single, was a No. 4 country hit. The album shipped five million copies in the United States, earning a 5× Multi-Platinum certification from the RIAA.

Her second album, Tell Me Why, was released by MCA/Curb in 1993. Also a platinum-selling album, it accounted for five consecutive Top Ten hits on the country charts: the title track, "Only Love", "Is It Over Yet", "Rock Bottom", and "Girls with Guitars", which was written by Mary Chapin Carpenter. "Tell Me Why" was her third crossover hit, peaking at No. 77 on the pop charts and No. 24 on the Adult Contemporary charts. Between "Tell Me Why" and "Only Love", she sang guest vocals on Clint Black's 1993 single "A Bad Goodbye" (from the album No Time to Kill), which became her biggest pop hit at No. 43. The success of this song led to a tour called the Black & Wy tour, featuring Black and Wynonna as headliners.

In 1994, she also made an appearance on the Lynyrd Skynyrd tribute album Skynyrd Frynds covering the band's song "Free Bird". She also sang duet vocals on Michael English's debut single, "Healing", which peaked at No. 120 on the pop charts. English is a contemporary Christian singer. After "Girls with Guitars" fell from the charts, Wynonna was the subject of negative publicity, as she had a child out of wedlock. She was absent from the country charts for all of 1995. In 1996, she married Arch Kelly, the father of her daughter and son. Revelations is the title of her third album, released by MCA/Curb in 1996. Also certified platinum, this album had her fourth and final number one hit, the Mike Reid/Gary Burr co-written "To Be Loved by You". Despite the song's minor Adult Contemporary success, the album's other three singles did not fare as well:

Wynonna's fourth and final album for MCA is titled The Other Side. Unlike her previous country pop-oriented albums, this album focused on a more blues and rock sound. It was released in 1997 and produced four singles. The album did not sell as well as her first three, however, only earning a gold certification. Its singles were not as successful on the charts, either: although "When Love Starts Talkin'" and "Come Some Rainy Day" reached No. 13 and No. 14, respectively, "Always Will" fell short of Top 40 and "Love Like That" became the first single of her career not to chart at all. After the release of a greatest hits album called Collection, Wynonna left MCA in favor of Mercury Records.

=== 2000–2004: Success in the new millennium ===
In 1999, Wynonna decided to reunite with her mother for a tour beginning on New Year's Eve. A month later, Wynonna released her fifth solo album, New Day Dawning. This album, the first of her career that Wynonna co-produced, included a four-song bonus disc entitled Big Bang Boogie composed of four new Judds songs.

What the World Needs Now Is Love, her sixth studio album, was released in August 2003, on Curb records. Lead-off single "What the World Needs" reached the Top 15 on the country charts, followed by the lesser singles "Heaven Help Me" and "Flies on the Butter (You Can't Go Home Again)", at No. 37 and No. 33 respectively. This latter song, originally recorded by Lari White on her album Stepping Stone, featured backing vocals from Naomi, and was credited on the charts as "Wynonna with Naomi Judd" instead of the Judds. Judd had success on the Hot Dance Airplay charts with a cover of Foreigner's "I Want to Know What Love Is". Her rendition peaked at No. 12 on that chart in 2005. Included on What the World Needs Now Is Love were two songs from soundtracks: a cover of the Elvis Presley hit "Burning Love", which Wynonna recorded for the animated movie Lilo & Stitch, and "You Are", co-written by Judd, which was included in the movie Someone Like You, a film starring sister Ashley Judd.

=== 2005–2010: New career directions ===
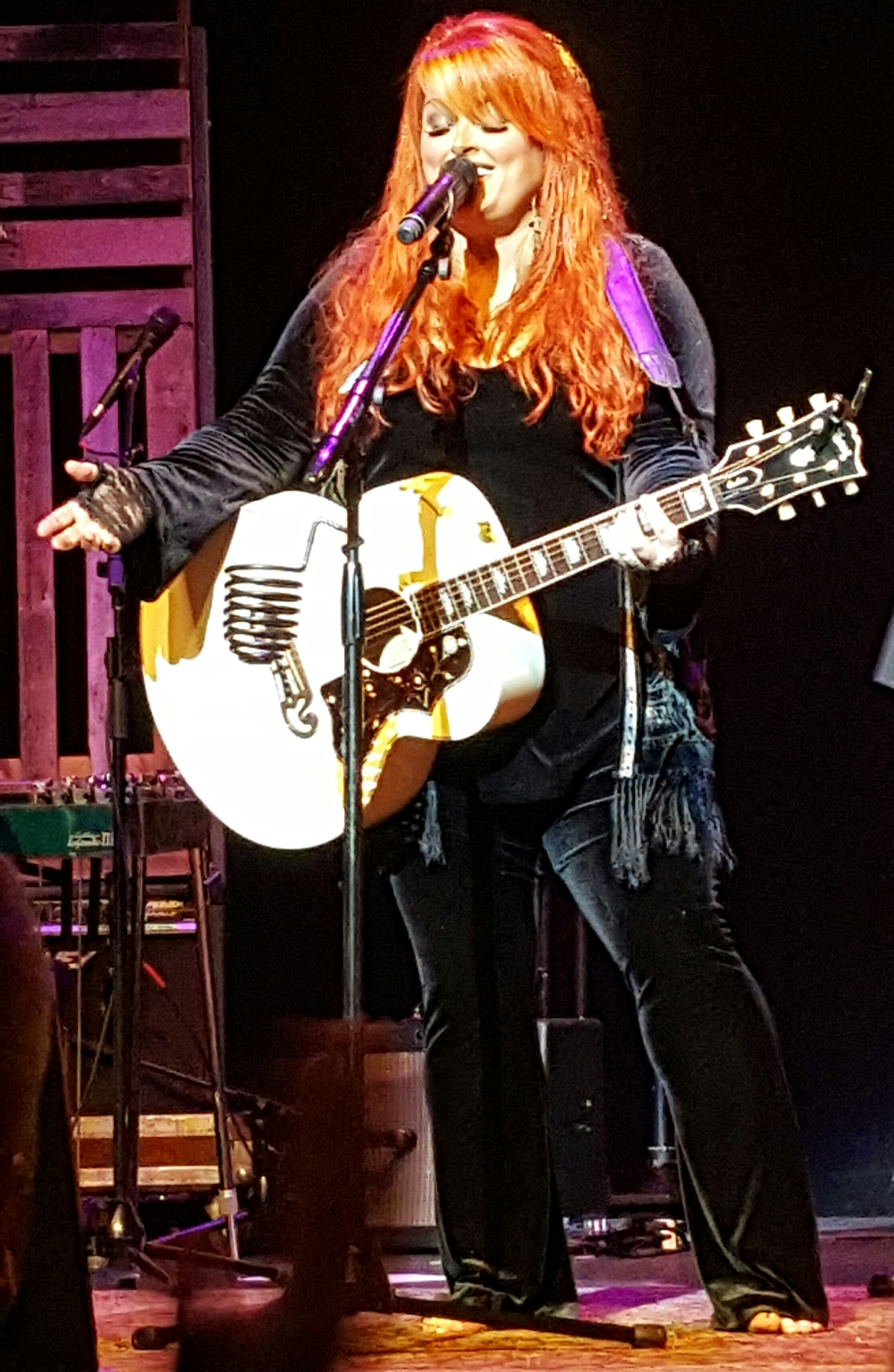
Wynonna Judd performing in Emporia, Kansas southwest of Topeka with the Big Noise, July 2016

Her second release for Asylum-Curb was a live CD/DVD package called Her Story: Scenes from a Lifetime, released in 2005 which was concurrently released with her best selling autobiography, Coming Home to Myself. The album included one new studio track, "Attitude". Written by Wynonna and John Rich of Big & Rich, this song was issued as a single, peaking at No. 40 on the country charts. Also in 2005, she released her first solo Christmas album called A Classic Christmas which included a Latin version of Ave Maria. She also sang an overdubbed duet with Elvis Presley on the 2008 RCA album Christmas Duets.

Sing: Chapter 1, her first studio album in six years, was released on February 3, 2009, on Curb Records. This album is largely composed of cover songs, except for the title track, an original composition by Rodney Crowell. It also reunites her with producers Brent Maher and Don Potter, who produced all of the Judds' 1980s albums. This album's lead-off single is "I Hear You Knocking", a blues standard first recorded by Smiley Lewis. On May 9, 2009, a seven-song EP containing dance remixes of the title track was released.

On September 14, 2010, the Judds appeared on The Oprah Winfrey Show where Wynonna discussed "her recent weight loss, her year of living dangerously and what it's like going back on stage as part of the iconic duo, the Judds". The Judds also performed their new single "I Will Stand By You", released October 4, 2010. "I Will Stand By You" was released as the title track to the Judd's 2011 Greatest Hits collection, I Will Stand by You: The Essential Collection.

=== 2011–present: Start of the Big Noise, end of The Judds ===
In 2011, Judd released her first novel, Restless Heart. A new single, "Love It Out Loud" was released in May 2011. On November 27, 2011, Wynonna debuted her new band "Wynonna & the Big Noise" in Nashville at 3rd and Lindsley. In March 2013 Wynonna released "Something You Can't Live Without", the first single off her forthcoming full-length album, produced by her husband/drummer Cactus Moser and set for release 2013 on Curb Records. This album—her first with all new material in over four years—was recorded in her own home studio and is deeply personal, especially noting the life-changing events the couple experienced in 2012.Judd released a new studio album, Wynonna & the Big Noise, on February 12, 2016. The album produced two singles 'Jesus And A Jukebox' and Things I Lean On'. In October 2020, Wynonna released a new extended play titled ‘Recollections’ via Anti Records.

On April 30, 2022, Naomi Judd died from a self-inflicted gunshot wound. She had suffered for years from depression and mental illness. It was nineteen days after the final performance of The Judds at the 2022 CMT Music Awards and a day before The Judds were inducted as a duo into the Country Music Hall of Fame.

When The Judds were inducted into the Hall of Fame the following day, Wynonna and her sister Ashley paid tribute to their mother on stage. A memorial service for Naomi Judd was televised on May 15. Wynonna announced that she would honor the original tour dates she and her mother had planned for summer 2022 as a tribute to her, supported by several female country artists. The tour was chronicled in the documentary Wynonna Judd: Between Hell and Hallelujah, which was released on April 26, 2023. On November 2, 2022, CMT produced a concert special; CMT Presents The Judds:Love Is Alive-The Final Concert in Murfreesboro, Tennessee where Judd and all the guest stars who appeared along last fall's tour routing converged for a show that was meant to more or less recreate the Judds’ famous original farewell concert back in 1991, shot on the same stage. The emotional concert featured special performances by Ashley McBryde, Brandi Carlile, Kelsea Ballerini, Martina McBride, and Little Big Town.

On June 9, 2026, Judd announced that The Hard Truth, her first studio album in ten years, would be released on October 2 and is the first time she has co-written songs on one of her projects.

== Television ==
Judd provided the voice of the rock star Molly Cule in the cartoon The Magic School Bus (Meets Molly Cule) and portrayed Green Puppy's owner on Blue's Clues in 1999. In 1998, during the fifth season of Touched by an Angel, Judd guest starred as a singer whose son was dying of cystic fibrosis. In 2005, Judd was a guest star on the show Hope & Faith in the episode "Wife Swap: Part 1 and Part 2" where she played the mean and rich Cynthia. In October 2005, she sang "It's About Love" for the VeggieTales episode Lord of the Beans. In 2006, Wynonna hosted the fourth season of USA Network's Nashville Star. In 2007, Wynonna starred in a special television event on NBC honoring her 23-year career, titled "Wynonna: A Tribute on Ice". It featured skating champions such as Kimmie Meissner and Brian Boitano. Both Wynonna and Naomi performed on the special. She also appeared as herself on the NBC sitcom Kath & Kim.

In August 2009, she guest starred as herself on the 10th anniversary of Who Wants to Be a Millionaire, with Regis Philbin for Backpack Ministries. In May 2010, she guest starred as herself on season 4, episode 6 on Lifetime's Army Wives. In November 2020, Judd was a supporting character, Marilyn Jinway, in the Hallmark Television film A Nashville Christmas Carol.

=== The Judds ===
On April 10, 2011, the Judds debuted on OWN: Oprah Winfrey Network. The six-episode, American reality-documentary television series followed the daily life of Wynonna and Naomi Judd on tour (it also showed preparations for the tour). On the show the two worked to become closer.

=== Dancing with the Stars ===
Wynonna was a contestant in 2013 on season 16 of Dancing with the Stars. She was partnered with all-star season champion Tony Dovolani.

== Honors and recognition ==
In 2007, Wynonna was given a star on the Music City Walk of Fame in Nashville, in her honor. In 2005, she received the USO's Merit Award for service to all divisions of the United States Armed Forces. She teamed with Habitat for Humanity to record "Heart of America", with Michael McDonald and Eric Benét, which helped raise over $90 million for victims of natural disasters to the Gulf Coast. She continues to bring attention to the global emergency of AIDS in her fourth year as United States Ambassador for YouthAIDS.

On May 1, 2022, Wynonna and Naomi Judd were inducted into the Country Music Hall of Fame as members of The Judds.

== Additional interests ==
On June 7, 2008, Wynonna participated in a live Internet chat for her fans in which she was asked questions submitted during the session. Over 6,000 fans signed up in a 5-minute span causing the server to crash. A total of 18,000 fans eventually logged on to watch Wynonna's chat live via Stickam.com. In 2009, she also became the spokeswoman for Alli, the only FDA-approved over-the-counter weight loss product, which featured the artist in a national marketing campaign.

Wynonna Judd co-hosted an episode of Today with Jenna & Friends with Jenna Bush Hager. Judd said she doesn't have a computer and when she watches television it is planned viewing. Otherwise she doesn't watch it.

== Personal life ==
Wynonna and businessman Arch Kelley III had a son before marrying in 1996. They had a daughter and divorced in 1998.

On November 22, 2003, Wynonna married D.R. Roach, her former bodyguard. Three years later Roach was arrested for sexual assault of a child under the age of 13. Judd filed for divorce five days later, on March 27, 2007.

Also in November 2003, Wynonna taped an appearance on an episode of The Oprah Winfrey Show discussing what she described as a severe dependence on food. The episode aired in February 2004. Judd had been working with the show in an effort to lose weight and get to the root of her dependence. In September 2005, she was on Oprah a second time discussing her weight loss.

Naomi told Wynonna that her father was Charles Jordan when Wynonna was 30. Wynonna found Jordan but he died before they could meet. Wynonna was a judge for the 6th annual Independent Music Awards, conducted to support independent artists' careers. Wynonna and her boyfriend Scott "Cactus" Moser, best known as the drummer for Highway 101, a country band, were engaged on December 24, 2011. They married on June 10, 2012, at her home in Leiper's Fork, Tennessee west of Franklin.

On August 18, 2012, Moser was severely injured in a motorcycle crash in South Dakota. He was on U.S. Route 16 in the Black Hills when he crossed the center line and hit a car. Injuries required his left leg to be amputated above the knee.

In June 2018, Wynonna's daughter Grace was sentenced to eight years in prison for violating probation. She had pleaded guilty to possession, manufacturing, and distribution of methamphetamines. She was released in December 2022, but re-arrested May 1, 2023.

In November 2024, Grace was arrested for allegedly stealing a church van and is held at the Albemarle-Charlottesville Regional Jail in Charlottesville, Virginia.

== Discography ==
Studio albums

- Wynonna (1992)
- Tell Me Why (1993)
- Revelations (1996)
- The Other Side (1997)
- New Day Dawning (2000)
- What the World Needs Now Is Love (2003)
- A Classic Christmas (2006)
- Sing: Chapter 1 (2009)
- Wynonna & the Big Noise (2016)
- The Hard Truth (2026)

=== Compilation albums ===
- Collection (1997)
- Love Heals (2010)
- Love Can Build a Bridge: Songs of Faith, Hope & Love (2015)
- All-Time Greatest Hits (2018)
- Back to Wy: Live (2024)

=== DVDs ===
- The Reunion (1999)
- Live From Venice (2002)
- Her Story: Scenes From A Lifetime (2005)
- Live From My Place (2021)

== Awards and nominations ==
Billboard Music Awards

- 1992: Country Single (No One Else On Earth) Award
- 1992: Best New Country Artist Award

Music Business Association

- 1992: Best Selling Country Female Award

Country Music Association Awards

- 1992: Female Vocalist Nomination
- 1992: Best Album Nomination
- 1992: Best Duo (with Clint Black) Nomination
- 1994: Female Vocalist of the Year Nomination

Playboy Awards

- 1993: Concert of the Year (Black and Wy) Award

Academy of Country Music Awards

- 1993: Top Female Vocalist Nomination
- 1993: Album of the Year Nomination
- 1994: Top Female Artist Award
- 2003: Humanitarian of the Year Nomination

Grammy Awards

- 1993: Best Female Country Vocal Performance: "Wynonna" - Nomination
- 1994: Best Female Country Vocal Performance: "Only Love" - Nomination
- 1994: Best Country Vocal Collaboration: "A Bad Goodbye" (w/ Clint Black) - Nomination
- 1995: Best Female Country Vocal Performance: "Is It Over Yet" - Nomination

American Music Awards

- 1997: Favorite Female/Country Nomination

Blockbuster Entertainment Awards

- 1997: Top Female/Country Nomination

GMA Dove Awards

- 2005: Favorite Country Recorded Song Nomination
- People's Choice Country Awards
- 2023: Country Champion Award
- ASCAP Nashville Songwriter Awards
- 2026: ASCAP Golden Note Award
