= Naomi Judd =

American country singer, songwriter and actress (1946–2022)

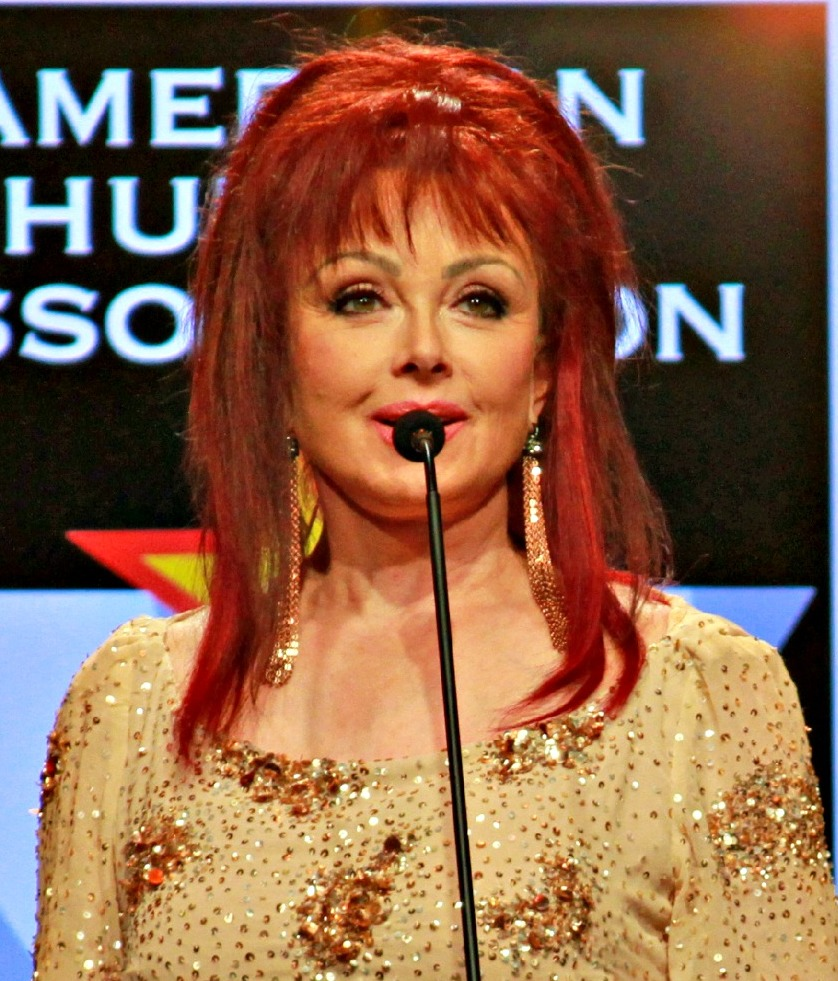
- Judd in 2012
- Born: Diana Ellen Judd; January 11, 1946; Ashland, Kentucky, U.S.
- Died: April 30, 2022 (aged 76); Leiper's Fork, Tennessee, U.S.
- Other name: Diana Ciminella
- Occupations: Singer; songwriter; actress; television personality
- Years active: 1979–2022
- Spouses: Michael Ciminella (m. 1964; div. 1972) Larry Strickland (m. 1989)
- Children: Wynonna; Ashley
- Musical career
- Genre: Country
- Instruments: Vocals
- Labels: RCA Records; Curb
- Formerly of: The Judds
- Website: naomijudd.com

Diana Ellen "Naomi" Judd (January 11, 1946 – April 30, 2022) was an American country music singer and actress. In 1980, she and her daughter Wynonna (born Christina Claire) formed the duo known as The Judds, who became a successful country music act, winning five Grammy Awards and nine Country Music Association awards. The Judds ceased performing in 1991 after Naomi was diagnosed with hepatitis; while Wynonna continued to perform as a solo artist, she occasionally reunited with her mother for tours as The Judds. Naomi died by suicide in 2022, the day before she and Wynonna were inducted into the Country Music Hall of Fame.

== Early life ==
Judd was born Diana Ellen Judd to Pauline Ruth "Polly" (née Oliver) and Charles Glen Judd on January 11, 1946, in Ashland, Kentucky. Her father owned a gas station and her mother was a riverboat cook. Her brother Brian died of leukemia in 1965 at the age of 17.

Judd's first child, Christina Claire Ciminella (later Wynonna Judd), was born when Judd was 18. Her daughter was given the last name Ciminella after Michael Ciminella, the man who Judd quickly married after being abandoned by her boyfriend and Wynonna's biological father, Charles Jordan. After the birth of her second daughter, Ashley (1968), who later became a film and stage actress, and the end of her marriage to Ciminella, Judd brought up both daughters as a single parent. Judd attended nursing school at the University of Kentucky campus in Lexington, Kentucky and then College of Marin in California from 1975 through 1979 while living in nearby Lagunitas, California.

When she reverted to her maiden name following her divorce, she also took the opportunity to change her name, Diana, which she did not think fit "her own spiritual, rural Kentucky conception of her true heritage", and decided to pay homage to the Biblical figure Naomi, finding resonance in her story of moving to another land and eventually being left without a husband raising two women.

== Career ==
=== The Judds ===
With her daughter Wynonna Judd, Naomi formed the successful country-music duo known as the Judds. Throughout the 1980s, they had twenty top-ten country hits, released six albums and featured regularly at the annual country music awards shows. They won five Grammy Awards, whereas Naomi won a Country Song of the Year Grammy for writing "Love Can Build a Bridge". The duo had moderate mainstream and international success.

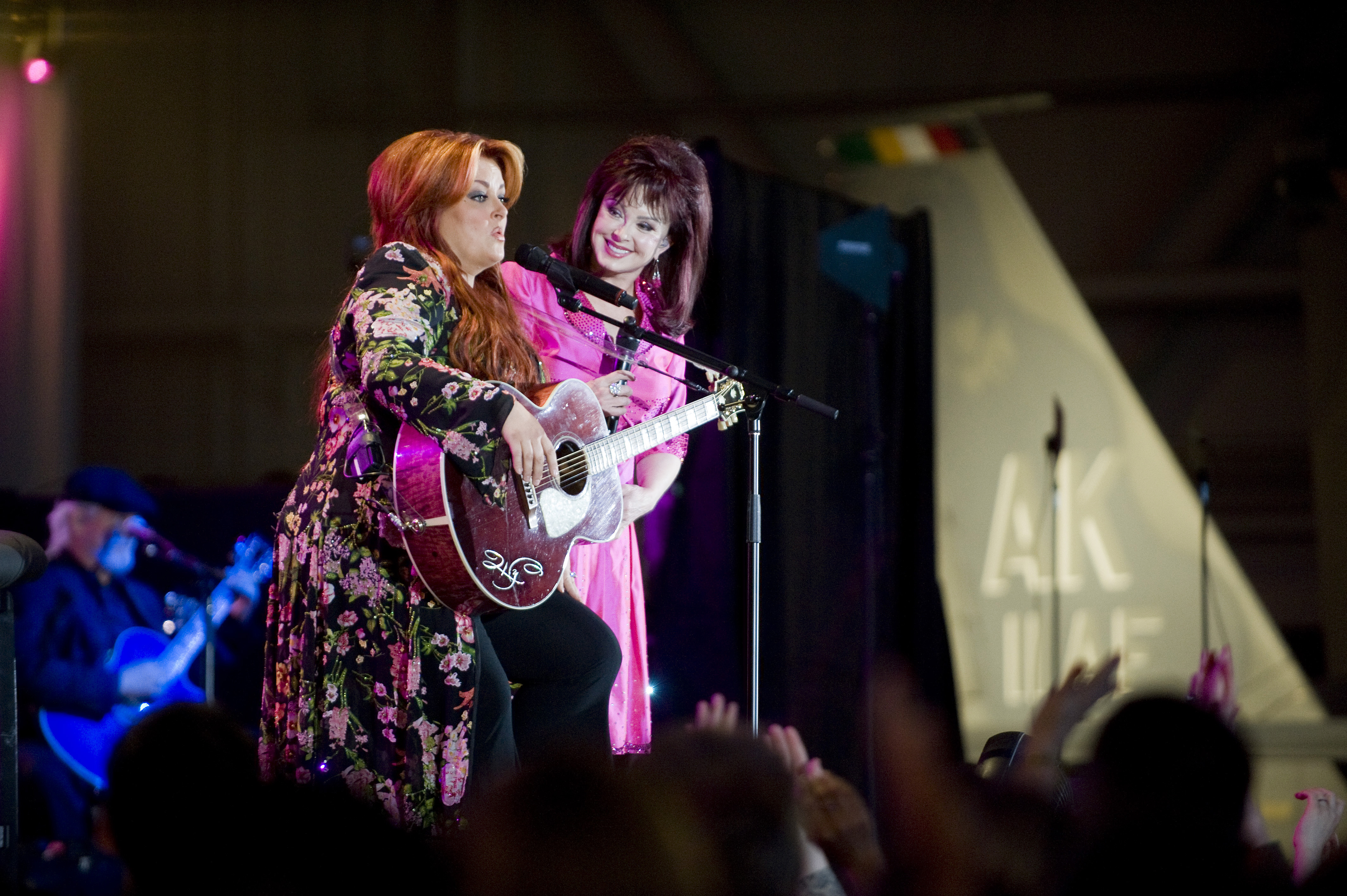
Wynonna and Naomi Judd sing together on base to the military and Alaska crowd at the "Alaska's Operational Gratitude" concert on June 27, 2008.

=== Breakup and solo work ===
The Judds broke up soon after Naomi Judd was diagnosed with hepatitis C in 1991. The band's farewell concert was the most successful musical event in cable pay-per-view history. Judd created the Naomi Judd Education and Research Fund in 1991 to raise awareness of hepatitis C, and used the strength of her experiences as a spokesmodel for the American Liver Foundation. She received the Golden Plate Award from the American Academy of Achievement in 1993.

In 1998, she achieved virologic cure of hepatitis C following treatment with interferon alpha. The Judds reunited for a 1999 New Year's Eve concert in Phoenix at the America West Arena, with Ashley as the MC. This continued with the "Power to Change" tour throughout 2000, while the Phoenix concert was released as The Judds Reunion Live. The duo was nominated as the Academy of Country Music's top vocal duo of the year in 2001.

From 2003 to 2004, Judd featured as a judge on the Star Search show hosted by Arsenio Hall. Judd began Naomi's New Morning, a Sunday morning talk show on the Hallmark Channel, in 2005. The show lasted two seasons. She was also the author of several self-help books, including Naomi's Guide to Aging Gratefully: Facts, Myths, and Good News for Boomers (2007).

Judd joined the television reality-competition series Can You Duet, as a judge and mentor in 2008. The show aired on CMT. She competed in a duo with her husband, Larry Strickland, in the first season of the Fox Broadcasting reality cooking series My Kitchen Rules in 2017.

In 2021, Judd was one of the first to be inducted into the Women Songwriters Hall of Fame.

=== Acting ===
Judd made her first screen appearance with a bit part in the 1979 comedy film More American Graffiti. She executive produced the 1995 made-for-television film Naomi & Wynonna: Love Can Build a Bridge based on her book. She guest-starred in the television series Sisters, The Client, 3rd Rock from the Sun and Touched by an Angel. She appeared in the 1983 TV movie Living Proof: The Hank Williams Jr. Story. In 1993, Judd played the female lead opposite Kenny Rogers in the made-for-television Western Rio Diablo. She continued to act, and in 1999 she starred as Lily Waite in the television film A Holiday Romance. Also that year, Judd starred in the drama film Family Tree. She made a cameo appearance in the 2001 romantic comedy film Someone Like You starring Ashley Judd.

Judd starred alongside Laura Prepon in the 2011 Lifetime television movie The Killing Game. She later starred in the Hallmark Channel films Nearlyweds and Window Wonderland, both released in 2013. In 2014, she starred as "Honey" in the Netflix film An Evergreen Christmas. In 2021, Judd starred in the Lifetime adaptation of V. C. Andrews' novel Ruby playing the title character's grandmother.

== Personal life ==
Judd had two daughters, Wynonna (b. 1964) and Ashley (b. 1968). Wynonna is a musician and was the other half of their duo, the Judds. Ashley is an actress with a career spanning more than three decades.

Judd married her second husband, Larry Strickland of the Palmetto State Quartet, on May 6, 1989. Strickland has also sung with other gospel groups, including J.D. Sumner and the Stamps Quartet.

=== Death ===
On April 30, 2022, Judd was found dead from a self-inflicted gunshot wound to her head at her home in Leiper's Fork, Tennessee. She was 76 years old. She had been struggling with depression, accompanied by anxiety, panic attacks and suicidal thoughts. The medications prescribed to treat her depression included lithium which caused side effects such as facial edema, alopecia and tremors. Her death came one day before she and Wynonna were inducted into the Country Music Hall of Fame.

Announcing her death, her daughters tweeted: "Today we sisters experienced a tragedy. We lost our beautiful mother to the disease of mental illness." Ashley Judd revealed the cause of her mother's death in a May 12, 2022, interview with Diane Sawyer on Good Morning America. She made the revelation to help raise awareness of mental illness, which she hoped would help those suffering from it. She also said that she and the rest of the family wanted the manner of death to be shared by them rather than a secondhand source.

A memorial for Judd was televised on CMT. Naomi Judd: A River of Time Celebration was broadcast from the Ryman Auditorium, as specified by Judd before she died and was hosted by Robin Roberts. It featured appearances from Ashley Judd, Larry Strickland, Bono, Bette Midler, Martina McBride, Reba McEntire, Reese Witherspoon, Morgan Freeman, Oprah Winfrey and Salma Hayek, plus performances by Wynonna, Brad Paisley, Carly Pearce, Ashley McBryde, Emmylou Harris and Allison Russell, Little Big Town, Brandi Carlile and Jamey Johnson.

== Discography ==
=== Singles ===
Year	Title	Peak positions	Album
Year	Title	US Country	Album
2004	"Flies on the Butter (You Can't Go Home Again)" (with Wynonna Judd)	33	What the World Needs Now Is Love

== Filmography ==
Year	Title	Role	Notes
1979	More American Graffiti	Girl in Bus	
1983	Living Proof: The Hank Williams, Jr. Story	Redhead	Television film
1993	Rio Diablo	Flora Mae Pepper	Television film
1994	Sisters	Naomi Judd	Episode: "Up in the Air"
1995	Naomi & Wynonna: Love Can Build a Bridge		Executive producer
1996	The Client	Psychiatrist	Episode: "Damn Yankees"
1996	3rd Rock from the Sun	Frances Randell	Episode: "Father Knows Dick"
1998	Littlest Angel's Easter	Understanding Angel	Voice
1999	Family Tree	Sarah Musser	
1999	A Holiday Romance	Lily Waite	Television film
2000	Touched by an Angel	Liz	Episode: "Mother's Day"
2001	Someone Like You...	Makeup Artist	
2002	Maybe It's Me	Tillie Krupp	Episode: "The Wedding and a Funeral Episode"
2002	Frasier	Lillian (voice)	Episode: "War of the Words"
2005	Higglytown Heroes	School Nurse Hero (voice)	Episode: "Two Bees or Not Two Bees"
2011	The Killing Game	Sandra Duncan	Television film
2011	The Judds	Herself	Executive producer, 6 episodes
2013	Nearlyweds	Renee	Television film
2013	Window Wonderland	Rita Dorentella	Television film
2014	An Evergreen Christmas	Honey	
2021	Ruby	Catherine Landry	Television film
