= Love Don't Live Here (Lady Antebellum song) =

2007 single by Lady Antebellum

Single by Lady Antebellum

from the album Lady Antebellum
- Released: October 2, 2007
- Genre: Country
- Length: 3:50
- Label: Capitol Nashville
- Songwriters: Hillary Scott; Charles Kelley; Dave Haywood
- Producers: Victoria Shaw; Paul Worley

Lady Antebellum singles chronology
"Never Alone" (2007)	"Love Don't Live Here" (2007)	"Lookin' for a Good Time" (2008)

Music video
- "Love Don't Live Here" at CMT.com

"Love Don't Live Here" is the debut single recorded by American country music trio Lady Antebellum. It was released on October 2, 2007 as the lead single from their self-titled debut album. Although the group had charted along with pop artist Jim Brickman on his 2007 single "Never Alone", this song serves as Lady Antebellum's first release to country radio. It was written by the group's three members (Hillary Scott, Charles Kelley, and Dave Haywood), and features Kelley on lead vocals. The song peaked at #3 on the Billboard Hot Country Songs chart dated for the week of June 14, 2008.

== Background ==
Kelley describes the song as follows: "I really felt like we found our sound on this song, and I was really proud that it became our first single since it was one of the first songs that the three of us wrote together." Producer Victoria Shaw had previously worked with the trio as a co-writer of "Never Alone".

In a 2017 interview with Billboard magazine, Kelley revealed that the song was written after Scott experienced a breakup and Kelley said "Let's write a song about it".

== Content ==
"Love Don't Live Here" is a mid-tempo country-rock arrangement in which Charles Kelley sings lead vocals. Accompanied by electric guitar and mandolin runs, the song finds the narrator addressing a former lover who has shown up at his door. He tells her that, although she is "passing through to claim [her] lost-and-found", he is emphatically unwilling to rekindle their relationship. While seemingly she had the upper hand and decided to end the previous relationship, it is clear that now, the narrator has the upper hand, as he emotionally and powerfully declares that he is moving on, and she is no longer welcome in his life.

== Music video ==
The song's music video was filmed and released in December 2007. Chris Hicky directed the video. Rather than portraying the emotionally powerful content of the song's lyrics, the music video simply chronicles the group's preparation and performance of the song in front of an audience at a small venue. In the aforementioned interview with Billboard magazine, Haywood explained that the music video making process took longer than he expected.

== Awards ==
At the 51st Grammy Awards, "Love Don't Live Here" received a nomination for Best Country Performance by a Duo or Group with Vocals. The group itself was nominated for Best New Artist as well.

== Credits and personnel ==
The following musicians perform on this track:

- Bruce Bouton – steel guitar
- Eric Darken – percussion
- Jason "Slim" Gambill – electric guitar
- Dave Haywood – acoustic guitar, mandolin, background vocals
- Charles Kelley – lead vocals
- Rob McNelley – electric guitar
- Michael Rojas – Hammond B-3 organ
- Hillary Scott – background vocals
- Victoria Shaw – background vocals
- Brice Williams – drums
- Paul Worley – acoustic guitar, electric guitar
- Craig Young – bass guitar

== Chart performance ==
Chart (2007–2008)	Peak position
Canada Hot 100 (Billboard)	69
Canada Country (Billboard)	5
US Billboard Hot 100	53
US Hot Country Songs (Billboard)	3

=== Year-end charts ===
Chart (2008)	Position
US Billboard Hot Country Songs	18
