= Bruce Bouton =

American guitarist (born 1954)

- Born: May 13, 1954 (age 72); South Carolina, U.S.
- Genres: Country music
- Occupation: Musician
- Instruments: Pedal steel guitar, slide guitar, electric guitar, resonator guitar, keyboards
- Years active: 1978–present
- Member of: The G-Men
- Website: brucebouton.com

Bruce Bouton is an American guitarist, session musician, producer, and songwriter. His pedal steel guitar has been featured on many country music recordings, and he helped reintroduce the pedal steel guitar to the forefront of the Nashville sound. Bouton is also a member of The G-Men, the group of session musicians who has played on the vast majority of Garth Brooks albums.

== Biography ==
Bouton began playing pedal steel in 1973 while studying at Virginia Commonwealth University in Richmond. He played with a number of local ensembles, including the Good Humor Band. In 1978, Bouton moved from Vienna Virginia to Nashville Tennessee in pursuit of a music career. His first work in Nashville was touring with Dottie West, then Lacy J. Dalton and then recording and touring with Ricky Skaggs.

=== Garth Brooks ===
Bouton has toured and recorded with Garth Brooks from the beginning of Brooks career. Bouton co-wrote the song "Against The Grain" for Brooks’ Ropin' The Wind album.

As part of Brooks' studio band the G Men, Bouton was inducted into the Musician's Hall of Fame and Museum.

=== Session work ===
Bouton has played steel guitar on records by Kenny Rogers, Brooks & Dunn, Keith Urban, Lonestar, Pam Tillis, Lady Antebellum, and Shania Twain.

=== Songwriting ===
Songs Bouton wrote or co-wrote have been recorded by T. Graham Brown ("The Last Resort"), George Strait ("I Ain't Never Seen No One Like You"), Glen Campbell ("Who's Minding the Garden"), and George Jones ("Walls Can Fall").

=== Touring ===
Bouton has toured with Ricky Skaggs, Mel Tillis, Foster and Lloyd, and Reba McEntire.

=== Music instruction ===
1986 Bouton created an instructional video Learn To Play Pedal Steel Guitar for Homespun.

=== Other ===
In 1994, Bouton was executive producer of Mama's Hungry Eyes: A Tribute to Merle Haggard on the Arista label.

Bouton hosts The Sidemen on Acme Radio, which features Nashville session musicians.

== Discography ==
=== With Ricky Skaggs ===
- 1981: Waitin' for the Sun to Shine (Epic)
- 1982: Highways & Heartaches (Epic)
- 1983: Don't Cheat in Our Hometown (Epic)
- 1984: Country Boy (Epic)
- 1985: Live in London (Epic)

=== With Garth Brooks ===
- 1989: Garth Brooks (Capitol)
- 1990: No Fences (Capitol)
- 1991: Ropin' the Wind (Liberty)
- 1992: The Chase (Liberty)
- 1992: Beyond the Season (Liberty)
- 1993: In Pieces (Liberty)
- 1995: Fresh Horses (Capitol)
- 1997: Sevens (Capitol)
- 1998: Double Live (Capitol)
- 2014: Man Against Machine (RCA)
- 2016: Gunslinger (Pearl)
- 2016: Christmas Together (Pearl) with Trisha Yearwood

=== As composer ===
- 1987: T. Graham Brown – "The Last Resort" (co-written with Bruce Burch and T. Graham Brown)
- 1992: Glen Campbell – Wings of Victory (New Haven) – track 6, "Who's Minding the Garden" (co-written with Alice Randall)
- 1992: George Jones – Walls Can Fall (MCA) – track 2, "Walls Can Fall" (co-written with Billy Yates and Frank Dycus)
- 1996: George Strait – Blue Clear Sky (MCA) – track 5, "I Ain't Ever Seen No One Like You" (co-written with Roger Springer and Mark Chesnutt)

=== Also appears on ===
==== 1986 – 1993 ====
- 1986: Orleans – Grown Up Children (MCA)
- 1987: Foster & Lloyd – Foster & Lloyd (RCA)
- 1989: Karen Staley – Wildest Dreams (MCA)
- 1990: Matraca Berg – Lying to the Moon (RCA)
- 1990: Emmylou Harris – Brand New Dance (Reprise)
- 1990: Ray Kennedy – What a Way to Go (Atlantic)
- 1991: Brooks & Dunn – Brand New Man (Arista)
- 1991: Billy Dean – Billy Dean (Liberty)
- 1991: Tracy Lawrence – Sticks and Stones (Atlantic)
- 1991: Kathy Mattea – Time Passes By (Mercury / Polygram)
- 1991: Michael Martin Murphey – Cowboy Christmas: Cowboy Songs II (Warner Bros.)
- 1991: Ronna Reeves – Only the Heart (Mercury)
- 1992: Hal Ketchum – Sure Love (Curb)
- 1992: Chris LeDoux – Whatcha Gonna Do with a Cowboy (Liberty)
- 1992: Ronna Reeves – The More I Learn (Mercury)
- 1992: Michelle Wright – Now and Then (Arista)
- 1992: Confederate Railroad – Confederate Railroad (Arista)
- 1993: Matraca Berg – The Speed of Grace (RCA)
- 1993: Tracy Byrd – Tracy Byrd (MCA)
- 1993: Brooks & Dunn – Hard Workin' Man (Arista)
- 1993: Mark Collie – Mark Collie (MCA)
- 1993: Conway Twitty – Final Touches (MCA)

==== 1994 – 1997 ====
- 1994: Brooks & Dunn – Waitin' on Sundown (Arista)
- 1994: Peter Hofmann – Country Roads (Columbia)
- 1994: James House – Days Gone By (Columbia)
- 1994: Kostas – X S in Moderation (Liberty)
- 1994: The Mavericks – What a Crying Shame (MCA)
- 1994: Michelle Wright – The Reasons Why (Arista)
- 1995: Emilio – Life is Good (Capitol Nashville)
- 1995: Brett James – Brett James (Career)
- 1995: Lonestar – Lonestar (BNA)
- 1995: Victoria Shaw – In Full View (Reprise)
- 1996: John Berry – Faces (Capitol Nashville)
- 1996: Brooks & Dunn – Borderline (Arista)
- 1996: Billy Dean – It's What I Do (Capitol Nashville)
- 1996: Ty Herndon – Living in a Moment (Epic)
- 1996: Gretchen Peters – The Secret of Life (Curb)
- 1996: LeAnn Rimes – Blue (Curb)
- 1997: Trace Adkins – Big Time (Capitol Nashville)
- 1997: Holly Dunn – Leave One Bridge Standing (River North)
- 1997: Matt King – Five O'Clock Hero (Atlantic)
- 1997: Michele Lee – Big Dreams & Broken Hearts: The Dottie West Story (self-released)
- 1997: Lonestar – Crazy Nights (BNA)
- 1997: Ricochet – Blink of an Eye (Columbia)
- 1997: Shania Twain – Come On Over (Mercury)
- 1997: Clay Walker – Rumor Has It (Giant)

==== 1998 – 2006 ====
- 1998: Brooks & Dunn – If You See Her (Arista Nashville)
- 1998: Paul Craft – Brother Jukebox (Strictly Country)
- 1998: Wade Hayes – When the Wrong One Loves You Right (Columbia)
- 1998: Olivia Newton-John – Back With a Heart (MCA Nashville)
- 1999: Brooks & Dunn – Tight Rope (Arista Nashville)
- 1999: Lonestar – Lonely Grill (BNA)
- 1999: Kenny Rogers – She Rides Wild Horses (Dreamcatcher)
- 1999: The Warren Brothers – Beautiful Day in the Cold Cruel World (BMG / Ariola)
- 2000: Tim Finn – Say It Is So (Sonny's Pop)
- 2000: Wynonna Judd – New Day Dawning (Curb)
- 2000: Eddy Raven – Living in Black and White (RMG)
- 2001: Maxwell – Now (Columbia)
- 2003: Kenny Rogers – Back to the Well (Sanctuary)
- 2004: Carolyn Dawn Johnson – Dress Rehearsal (Arista Nashville)
- 2004: Keith Urban – Be Here (Capitol Nashville)
- 2005: Trace Adkins – Songs About Me (Capitol Nashville)
- 2005: Billy Gilman – Everything and More (Image Entertainment)
- 2005: Faith Hill – Fireflies (Warner Bros.)
- 2005: LeAnn Rimes – This Woman (Curb)
- 2005: Smith & Harley – Ride to Live (33rd Street
- 2006: Eric Church – Sinners Like Me (Capitol Nashville)
- 2006: Steve Holy – Brand New Girlfriend (Curb)
- 2006: Rascal Flatts – Me and My Gang (Lyric Street)
- 2006: Kenny Rogers – Water & Bridges (EMI)
- 2006: P. F. Sloan – Sailover (Hightone)
- 2006: Taylor Swift – Taylor Swift (Big Machine)

==== 2007 – present ====
- 2008: Lady Antebellum – Lady Antebellum (Capitol Nashville)
- 2009: Eric Church – Carolina (Capitol Nashville)
- 2009: Jessie Farrell – Good, Bad & Pretty Things (604)
- 2009: Sara Groves – Fireflies and Songs (INO / Sponge)
- 2009: Jonas Brothers – Lines, Vines and Trying Times (Hollywood)
- 2009: Toby Keith – American Ride (Show Dog Nashville)
- 2009: Keith Urban – Defying Gravity (Capitol Nashville)
- 2010: Lucy Angel – Lucy Angel (G-Force)
- 2010: Toby Keith – Bullets in the Gun (Show Dog-Universal)
- 2010: Lady Antebellum – Need You Now (Capitol Nashville)
- 2010: Maroon 5 – Hands All Over (A&M Octone)
- 2010: Reba McEntire – All the Women I Am (Valory)
- 2011: Lady Antebellum – Own the Night (Capitol Nashville)
- 2011: Keb' Mo' – The Reflection (Yolabelle)
- 2011: Rhonda Vincent and Gene Watson – Your Money and My Good Looks (Upper Management)
- 2012: Edens Edge – Edens Edge (Big Machine Records)
- 2012: Green River Ordinance – Under Fire (Good Time)
- 2012: Adam Gregory – Different Places (Calusa)
- 2012: Jennette McCurdy - Jennette McCurdy (Capitol Nashville)
- 2012: Soleil Moon – On the Way to Everything (Frontiers)
- 2013: Danielle Bradbery – Danielle Bradbery (Republic Nashville)
- 2013: LoCash Cowboys – LoCash Cowboys (Average Joe's)
- 2013: Robin Meade – Count on Me (Mood Media)
- 2013: Holly Williams – The Highway (Georgiana)
- 2014: Lenny Cooper – The Grind (Average Joe's / Back Road)
- 2014: Eric Paslay – Eric Paslay (Capitol / EMI)
- 2015: The Cox Family – Gone Like the Cotton (Rounder)
- 2015: Steve Grand – All-American Boy (Grand Nation)
- 2015: The Lacs – Outlaw in Me (Backroad)
- 2016: Josh Kelley – New Lane Road (Sugar Hill)
- 2017: Brantley Gilbert – The Devil Don't Sleep (Valory Music)
- 2017: Toby Keith – The Bus Songs (Show Dog Nashville)
- 2017: The Lacs – American Rebelution (Average Joe's)
- 2021: Kimmi Bitter - Highway Hustler
- 2026: Brandon Flowers - Thrasher

=== Music instruction ===
- 1986: Learn To Play Pedal Steel Guitar VCR (Homespun) reissued on DVD in 2004
