= Never Alone (Jim Brickman song) =

Single by Jim Brickman featuring Lady Antebellum

from the album Escape and Never Alone
- Released: February 20, 2007
- Genre: New-age; country pop; CCM
- Length: 3:40
- Label: Savoy
- Songwriters: Gary Burr; Sarah Buxton; Victoria Shaw
- Producer: Dan Shea

Jim Brickman singles chronology
"Escape" (2006)	"Never Alone" (2007)	"Coming Home for Christmas" (2007)

Lady Antebellum singles chronology
"Never Alone" (2007)	"Love Don't Live Here" (2007)

"Never Alone" is a song written by Gary Burr, Sarah Buxton, and Victoria Shaw and recorded by American songwriter and pianist Jim Brickman. Originally recorded with American country music singer Sara Evans on vocals for his 2006 album, Escape, it was famously re-recorded with American country pop trio Lady Antebellum for its release as a single. This latter version was released to digital retailers through Savoy Records on February 20, 2007 and impacted American adult contemporary radio that spring. Lady Antebellum’s female vocalist, Hillary Scott, is sometimes credited individually alongside Lady Antebellum .

"Never Alone" is primarily a new-age song with additional influences of country and pop genres and is instrumented primarily by piano. Its lyrics discuss the idea of unconditional love and support as well as the importance of holding onto one's faith through difficult times.

The song was released to generally positive reviews, who complimented its country crossover appeal, and was a success on adult contemporary radio. It peaked at number 14 on the Billboard Adult Contemporary airplay chart in July 2007, earning Brickman his 22nd entry on the chart and 13th top-15 hit. Furthermore, the song was Lady Antebellum's first entry on a Billboard chart before their proper debut single, "Love Don't Live Here", was released in October of that year; they would later match this position with their own single, "I Run to You" in 2009 before topping the AC chart with "Need You Now" that same year.

== Composition ==
"Never Alone" is a new-age sentimental ballad composed by Gary Burr, Sarah Buxton, and Victoria Shaw. It has an approximate duration of three minutes and forty seconds (3:40) on the single version performed by Jim Brickman and Lady Antebellum. According to the digital sheet music published by Musicnotes.com through Kobalt Music Publishing, the song was originally composed in the key of D major and set in 6/8 time to a slow, rhythmic tempo of approximately 56 BPM. The vocal range spans from a low note of F♯_{3} to a high note of B_{4}. The song also draws on influences country music and contemporary Christian music in its vocal arrangement and lyrical themes. "Never Alone" deals with the concept of unconditional love and delivers a positive message that someone will always be there to support you if you have faith.

Hillary Scott performs lead vocals on the single version, with vocal harmonies from her Lady Antebellum group members, Charles Kelley and Dave Haywood. Jim Brickman plays the piano on the track, while Haywood additionally plays guitar. The track was produced by Dan Shea for its release as a single.

== Critical reception ==
Chuck Taylor of Billboard was complimentary of the collaboration, noting the song's potential for crossover success on the country music and adult contemporary formats. "Never Alone" was ranked as Brickman's second-best song by AXS in September 2015, with reviewer Michelle Lavallee praising Scott's vocal performance in particular.

== Music video ==
The music video for "Never Alone" was directed by Glenn Sweitzer and premiered June 12, 2007. It features Brickman and Lady Antebellum performing the song in a recording studio, with most of the shots centering either on Scott singing or Brickman playing on the piano.

== Album appearances ==
In addition to the Evans version appearing on Escape, the Lady Antebellum version of "Never Alone" was featured on the 2009 re-issue of Valentine (originally released in 2002), a 2010 CD/DVD compilation also titled Never Alone, and two compilation albums – Ultimate Love Songs (2008) and More Greatest Hits (2012).

== Charts ==
=== Weekly charts ===
Chart (2007)	Peak position
US Adult Contemporary (Billboard)	14
Chart (2010)	Peak position
US New Age Digital Songs (Billboard)	1

=== Year-end charts ===
Chart (2007)	Position
US Adult Contemporary (Billboard)	36

== Cover version ==
- "Velkommen hjem" on the album Til deg, by Sissel Kyrkjebø

The lead-song of this album is "Velkommen hjem" (Welcome Home), a Norwegian translation of Victoria Shaw's "Never Alone". It's a country-influenced ballad and was translated by the Norwegian musician Guren Hagen. Sissel asked him to write the lyrics in Norwegian to the melody of "Never Alone". This song was a big hit on Norwegian radio and has been performed by Sissel on several occasions. Sissel performed "Velkommen hjem" as a duet with Swedish singer Carola on the Norwegian-Swedish talkshow Skavlan in November 2010 and later in December as a duet with Danish singer Poul Krebs on the Danish Christmas TV-concert DR's store juleshow.

- "莫忘初衷" by the Taiwanese band Power Station.
