= Need You Now (Lady Antebellum album) =

Studio album by Lady Antebellum
- Released: January 26, 2010
- Recorded: 2009
- Genre: Country; country pop
- Length: 44:10
- Label: Capitol Nashville
- Producer: Paul Worley; Lady Antebellum

Lady Antebellum chronology
Lady Antebellum (2008)	Need You Now (2010)	iTunes Session (2010)

Singles from Need You Now
- 1. "Need You Now" Released: August 11, 2009; 2. "American Honey" Released: January 11, 2010; 3. "Our Kind of Love" Released: May 31, 2010; 4. "Hello World" Released: October 4, 2010

Need You Now is the second studio album by American country music trio Lady Antebellum. It was released on January 26, 2010 through Capitol Nashville. It is the follow-up album to their 2008 self-titled debut album. The production on the album was handled by Paul Worley and Lady Antebellum.

Need You Now received generally positive reviews from music critics and was also a massive commercial success. The album debuted at number one on the US Billboard 200, selling 481,000 copies in its first week. It was eventually certified quadruple platinum by the Recording Industry Association of America (RIAA) in March 2013. On February 13, 2011, the album won the Best Country Album and was nominated for Album of the Year, whereas the single "Need You Now" won four awards, including Song of the Year and Record of the Year at the 53rd Annual Grammy Awards.

== Singles ==
"Need You Now", the first single, debuted at number 50 on the U.S. Billboard Hot Country Songs chart in August 2009. For the week of November 28, it became their second number one single on the Hot Country Songs chart in the United States, as issued by Billboard. After the trio's performance of the song at the Country Music Association Awards, it climbed to a number five peak on the Billboard Hot 100, experiencing a surge in sales after the 52nd Annual Grammy Awards, peaking at number two, their highest peaking single on the Hot 100 and pop charts. As of January 5, 2013, it has been certified 6× Platinum by the RIAA. The song was used in the first episode of the TV show Hellcats.

"American Honey", the second single, debuted at number 47 on the Hot Country Songs chart for the week of January 2, 2010, before its initial release date of January 11, 2010. In April 2010, the song became their third consecutive number one single, as well as third top 30 single on the Billboard Hot 100.

In the United Kingdom and Europe (except Germany), "I Run to You" was the second single taken from the International Edition of the album. It was released on 9 August 2010 in support of their debut UK live show at Shepherd's Bush Empire.

"Our Kind of Love" was confirmed as the third single off the album. The song was released as a promotional single on January 10, 2010, and received its official release as the set's third single in late May.

"Hello World", the album's fourth single, was released to radio on October 4, 2010.

== Critical reception ==
Professional ratings
Review scores
Source	Rating
AllMusic	3.5/5 stars
American Songwriter	2/5 stars
Billboard	4/5 stars
The Boston Globe	(favourable)
Country Weekly	4/5 stars
Entertainment Weekly	B+
Los Angeles Times	3/4 stars
Rolling Stone	2/5 stars
Slant Magazine	2/5 stars
Engine 145	3/5 stars

Upon its release, Need You Now received generally mixed reviews from music critics. At Metacritic, which assigns a normalized rating out of 100 to reviews from mainstream critics, the album received an average score of 63, based on 9 reviews, which indicates "generally favorable reviews".

Giving it four stars out of five, Jessica Phillips wrote in Country Weekly magazine that the group "certainly need have no fear of a sophomore slump" due to the success of "Need You Now". She also said that the album showed the trio's "ability to craft memorable country pop hooks," but added that "not every song works on this record." Crystal Bell, writing for Billboard, was also positive in her review, citing Kelley's vocal slyness and the delicate arrangement of the track "Ready to Love Again", also noting "the trio's musical growth."

AllMusic reviewer Thom Jurek wrote that on this album "they stick very close to the formula of their debut: a slew of mid- and uptempo love songs, a sad ballad, and a couple of rocked-up good-time tunes — all self-written with some help from some of Nashville's most respected writers." He also went on to say that the album was "flawless in its songwriting, production, and performances." Mikael Wood of Entertainment Weekly said, "they're most successful when they keep to the moody minor key stuff" and gave the album a B+. Jonathan Keefe of Slant Magazine was less positive.

Allegations that the title song stole from The Alan Parsons Project's song "Eye in the Sky" have been widespread online, and representatives for Parsons commented.

== Commercial performance ==
Need You Now debuted at number one on the US Billboard 200 chart, selling 481,000 copies in its first week. This became Lady Antebellum's first US number one debut. In its second week, the album remained at number one on the chart, selling an additional 209,000 copies.

In its third week, the album dropped to number two on the chart, selling 208,000 more copies. In its fourth week, the album remained at number two on the chart, selling 144,000 copies.

In 2010, the album became the third best-selling album of the year, behind I Dreamed a Dream by Susan Boyle and Recovery by American rapper Eminem. The album also spent 31 non-consecutive weeks at number one on the Top Country Albums chart in 2010 and 2011. On March 20, 2013, the album was certified quadruple platinum by the Recording Industry Association of America (RIAA) for sales of over four million copies in the United States.

After the 53rd Annual Grammy Awards and the band winning five awards, Need You Now debuted at number 24 on the German Albums Chart in February 2011, 9 months after the release of the album.

=== Usage in other media ===
The song "Perfect Day" has been used in one of The CW's commercials to promote new TV series Hart of Dixie.

== Track listing ==
No.	Title	Writer(s)	Length
1.	"Need You Now"	Hillary Scott; Charles Kelley; Dave Haywood; Josh Kear	4:36
2.	"Our Kind of Love"	Scott; Kelley; Haywood; busbee	4:09
3.	"American Honey"	Cary Barlowe; Hillary Lindsey; Shane Stevens	3:44
4.	"Hello World"	Tom Douglas; Tony Lane; David Lee	5:26
5.	"Perfect Day"	Scott; Kelley; Haywood; Jerry Flowers	3:21
6.	"Love This Pain"	Marv Green; Jason Sellers	3:03
7.	"When You Got a Good Thing"	Scott; Kelley; Haywood; Rivers Rutherford	4:57
8.	"Stars Tonight"	Scott; Kelley; Haywood; Monty Powell	4:04
9.	"If I Knew Then"	Kelley; Powell; Anna Wilson	4:15
10.	"Something 'Bout a Woman"	Scott; Kelley; Haywood; Craig Wiseman	3:41
11.	"Ready to Love Again"	Scott; Kelley; Haywood; busbee	2:53
Total length:			44:10

iTunes Store reissue
No.	Title	Writer(s)	Length
1.	"Need You Now" (single version)	Scott; Kelley; Haywood; Kear	3:56
2.	"Our Kind of Love"	Scott; Kelley; Haywood; busbee	4:09
3.	"American Honey"	Barlowe; Lindsey; Stevens	3:44
4.	"Hello World"	Douglas; Lane; Lee	5:26
5.	"Perfect Day"	Flowers; Scott; Kelley; Haywood	3:21
6.	"Love This Pain"	Green; Sellers	3:03
7.	"When You Got a Good Thing"	Scott; Kelley; Haywood; Rutherford	4:57
8.	"Stars Tonight"	Scott; Kelley; Haywood; Powell	4:04
9.	"If I Knew Then"	Kelley; Powell; Wilson	4:15
10.	"Something 'Bout a Woman"	Scott; Kelley; Haywood; Wiseman	3:41
11.	"Ready to Love Again"	Scott; Kelley; Haywood; busbee	2:53
12.	"Need You Now" (album version)	Scott; Kelley; Haywood; Kear	4:37

International Edition (Pop version)
No.	Title	Writer(s)	Length
1.	"Need You Now"	Scott; Kelley; Haywood; Kear	3:55
2.	"Our Kind of Love"	Scott; Kelley; Haywood; busbee	4:07
3.	"American Honey"	Barlowe; Lindsey; Stevens	3:45
4.	"Hello World"	Douglas; Lane; Lee	5:24
5.	"Perfect Day"	Scott; Kelley; Haywood; Flowers	3:21
6.	"Love This Pain"	Green; Sellers	3:03
7.	"When You Got a Good Thing"	Scott; Kelley; Haywood; Rutherford	4:56
8.	"Stars Tonight"	Scott; Kelley; Haywood; Powell	4:02
9.	"If I Knew Then"	Scott; Kelley; Haywood; Wilson	4:13
10.	"Lookin' for a Good Time"	Scott; Kelley; Haywood; Lindsey; Follesé	3:06
11.	"Ready to Love Again"	Scott; Kelley; Haywood; busbee	2:51
12.	"I Run to You"	Scott; Kelley; Haywood; Lindsey; Douglas	4:17

Japanese bonus track
No.	Title	Writer(s)	Length
13.	"Bottle Up Lightning"	Kelley; Haywood; Tony Martin; Wendell Lee Mobley	4:05
Total length:			51:17

International iTunes Store bonus track
No.	Title	Writer(s)	Length
13.	"Last Night Last"	Scott; Kelley; Haywood; Brent Baxter	4:13

== Bonus download songs ==
Each month on ladyantebellum.com, a new song became available to all who bought a CD, digital download, or passcode version of the album.

1. "Need You Now" (Acoustic) (Haywood, Kear, Kelley, Scott) — (Jan–Feb)
2. "I Run to You" (Acoustic) (Haywood, Kelley, Scott, Douglas) — (March)
3. "American Honey" (Live) (Barlowe, Lindsey, Stevens) — (April)
4. "Our Kind of Love" (Live) (Haywood, Kelley, Scott, Busbee) — (May)
5. "Stars Tonight" (Live) (Powell, Haywood, Kelley, Scott) — (June)
6. "All We'd Ever Need" (Live) (Haywood, Kelley, Scott) — (July)
7. "Do I" (Live) (Luke Bryan, Kelley, Haywood) — (August)
8. "When You Got a Good Thing" (Live) (Haywood, Kelly, Rutherford, Scott) — (September)
9. "Slow Down Sister" (Live) (Haywood, Kelly, Gambill, Shaw) — (October)
10. "Love's Lookin' Good On You" (Live) (Deere, Lopez, Shaw) — (November)
11. "Hello World" (Live) (Douglas, Lane, Lee) — (December)

== Personnel ==
=== Lady Antebellum ===
- Dave Haywood – acoustic guitar, electric guitar, piano, mandolin, background vocals
- Charles Kelley – lead vocals, background vocals
- Hillary Scott – lead vocals, background vocals

=== Additional musicians ===
- Bruce Bouton – dobro
- busbee – piano
- Chad Cromwell – drums
- Stuart Duncan – fiddle, mandolin
- Jason "Slim" Gambill – electric guitar, soloist
- David Huff – loop programming, percussion, tambourine
- Rob McNelley – electric guitar, soloist
- The Nashville String Machine – strings
- Mike Rojas – accordion, Hammond B-3 organ, piano, synthesizer
- Kris Wilkinson – string arrangements
- Paul Worley – acoustic guitar, electric guitar, soloist
- Craig Young – bass guitar

== Charts ==
=== Weekly charts ===
Chart (2010–11)	Peak position
Australian Albums (ARIA)	5
Australian Country Albums (ARIA)	1
Austrian Albums (Ö3 Austria)	10
Belgian Albums (Ultratop Flanders)	19
Canadian Albums (Billboard)	1
Dutch Albums (Album Top 100)	4
French Albums (SNEP)	19
German Albums (Offizielle Top 100)	24
Irish Albums (IRMA)	11
New Zealand Albums (RMNZ)	1
Norwegian Albums (VG-lista)	31
Portuguese Albums (AFP)	6
Scottish Albums (OCC)	6
Spanish Albums (Promusicae)	22
Swedish Albums (Sverigetopplistan)	21
Swiss Albums (Schweizer Hitparade)	10
UK Albums (OCC)	8
US Billboard 200	1
US Top Country Albums (Billboard)	1

=== Year-end charts ===
Chart (2010)	Position
Australian Albums (ARIA)	81
Canadian Albums (Billboard)	8
Dutch Albums (Album Top 100)	46
French Albums (SNEP)	164
New Zealand Albums (RMNZ)	17
UK Albums (OCC)	118
US Billboard 200	3
US Top Country Albums (Billboard)	1
Chart (2011)	Position
Australian Albums (ARIA)	28
New Zealand Albums (RMNZ)	38
Swiss Albums (Schweizer Hitparade)	94
UK Albums (OCC)	156
US Billboard 200	19
US Top Country Albums (Billboard)	4
Chart (2012)	Position
Australian Albums (ARIA)	99

=== Decade-end charts ===
Chart (2010–2019)	Position
Australian Albums (ARIA)	92
US Billboard 200	18

=== Singles ===
Year	Single	Peak chart positions			
Year	Single	US Country	US	CAN Country	CAN
2009	"Need You Now"	1	2	1	2
2010	"American Honey"	1	25	1	50
2010	"Our Kind of Love"	1	51	1	61
2010	"Hello World"	6	58	4	70

== Certifications ==
Region	Certification	Certified units/sales
Australia (ARIA)	Platinum	70,000^{^}
Brazil (Pro-Música Brasil)	Platinum	40,000^{‡}
Canada (Music Canada)	3× Platinum	240,000^{^}
Ireland (IRMA)	Gold	7,500^{^}
New Zealand (RMNZ)	Platinum	15,000^{^}
Switzerland (IFPI Switzerland)	Gold	15,000^{^}
United Kingdom (BPI)	Platinum	300,000^{^}
United States (RIAA)	4× Platinum	4,000,000^{^}
^{^} Shipments figures based on certification alone.^{‡} Sales+streaming figures based on certification alone.

== Release history ==
Country	Date	Label
United States	January 26, 2010	Capitol
Canada	January 26, 2010	Capitol
South Africa	January 26, 2010	EMI
Australia	February 12, 2010	EMI
United Kingdom	May 3, 2010	Parlophone
Germany	May 7, 2010	Capitol
Brazil	May 21, 2010	EMI
Mexico	May 21, 2010	EMI
Japan	May 26, 2010	Toshiba-EMI
