= Hello World (Lady Antebellum song) =

Single by Lady Antebellum

from the album Need You Now
- Released: October 4, 2010
- Genre: Country
- Length: 5:26 (album version); 4:27 (radio version)
- Label: Capitol Nashville
- Songwriter(s): Tom Douglas; Tony Lane; David Lee
- Producer(s): Paul Worley; Lady Antebellum

Lady Antebellum singles chronology
"Our Kind of Love" (2010)	"Hello World" (2010)	"Just a Kiss" (2011)

"Hello World" is a song written by Tom Douglas, Tony Lane and David Lee, and recorded by American country music group Lady Antebellum. It was released in October 2010, as the fourth and final single from their album Need You Now (2010). The song was scheduled to be released to country radio on October 4, 2010, but debuted on the Hot Country Songs chart at number 53 one week prior to its official release. "Hello World" was performed at the 2010 CMA Awards, and it features lead vocals from Kelley.

== Critical reception ==
"Hello World" received mixed reviews from critics. Matt Bjorke of Roughstock called it "a song that hits all the right notes from the very first chord" and calls the lyrics "completely universal in the fact that everyone feels pressured by the world around them at some time and they forget to take pleasures in the little simplicities of life, like the waving hand and smile of a child, getting in touch with your faith, and how the simple things in life are really what it’s all about." Kevin John Coyne of Country Universe gave the song a C rating, calling it "a running narration of the most boring drive through town ever" and saying that it "sounds like little more than Bruce Springsteen at his most self-indulgent." Engine 145 reviewer Karlie Justus gave it a thumbs-down, saying that the song "would work better as fodder for [Seth Meyers and Amy Poehler–or any other comedic duo–as a left-of-the-mark Saturday Night Live skit than a pseudo-inspirational anthem for country radio" but saying that Hillary Scott’s vocals are "a shimmering bright spot amidst the heavy-handedness."

== Music video ==
The music video for "Hello World" made its world premiere on ABC's Music Lounge on October 28, 2010. The music video, directed by Roman White, was filmed in Nashville in early October 2010.

In the beginning of the video there is a man in his convertible yelling in his cell phone and is frustrated. He then looks over to a little girl in a rust red mini van with chocolate on her face, just like it's described in the song. His mood changes when he catches the girl smiling and waving at him as she rides by. The little girl's parents are arguing in the front. Later on the man in the convertible is stopped by traffic. He gets out of his car, and sees the EMT, firemen, police, and a group of people. He walks his way over there and when he gets to the scene he sees that same rust red mini van is turned over. The dad is on a backboard being lifted into the ambulance, and the mother who has some blood on her is looking over. The little girl is next to be rescued from the van and is also put on a backboard. She is unconscious and her mother wants to come over to her. While the paramedics are trying to revive her the man sees a ghost like version of the girl looking at herself then up to him smiling. Just when they think they have lost her, the little girl takes a deep breath and opens her eyes. She then yells for her mommy. The man and everybody else watching are relieved. When the man gets back in his car he pulls out a picture of him with his wife and kids and looks at it.

There are performance shots of the trio sitting in the middle of the intersection where the accident happen.

== In popular culture ==
The song was featured in the NCIS episode "Recruited" and in Criminal Minds.

== Chart performance ==
"Hello World" debuted at number 53 on the U.S. Billboard Hot Country Songs chart for the week of October 9, 2010. It also debuted at number 70 on the Billboard Hot 100 on the week ending November 27, 2010. It also debuted at number 96 on Canadian Hot 100 chart for the week of November 27, 2010. It peaked at number 6 on the country chart in March 2011, becoming Lady Antebellum's first single to miss the Top 5 since "Lookin' for a Good Time" peaked at number 11 in 2008.

Chart (2010–2011)	Peak position
Canada (Canadian Hot 100)	70
Canada Country (Billboard)	4
US Billboard Hot 100	58
US Hot Country Songs (Billboard)	6

=== Year-end charts ===
Chart (2011)	Position
US Country Songs (Billboard)	40
