= National Assembly Building =

National Assembly Building may refer to:

- National Assembly Building of Armenia
- National Assembly Building of Belize
- Bulgaria National Assembly Building
- National Assembly Building (Beijing), China
- Kuwait National Assembly Building
- National Assembly Complex, Nigeria
- National Assembly Building (South Korea)
- National Assembly Building of Slovenia
- National Assembly Building of Vietnam
- Jatiya Sangsad Bhaban of Bangladesh

== See also ==
- Category:Seats of national legislatures
