= Our Kind of Love =

Single by Lady Antebellum

from the album Need You Now
- Released: May 31, 2010
- Genre: Country
- Length: 4:09 (album version); 3:47 (radio version)
- Label: Capitol Nashville
- Songwriter(s): Hillary Scott; Charles Kelley; Dave Haywood; busbee
- Producer(s): Paul Worley; Lady Antebellum

Lady Antebellum singles chronology
"American Honey" (2010)	"Our Kind of Love" (2010)	"Hello World" (2010)

"Our Kind of Love" is a song recorded by American country music group Lady Antebellum. Written by the trio along with busbee, it was released on May 31, 2010, as the third single from their album Need You Now. It debuted at number 50 on the Billboard Hot Country Songs charts dated for May 24, 2010. It was first released January 17, 2010 as the third and final promotional single as part of the iTunes Countdown to Need You Now, and it features lead vocals from both Scott and Kelley.

== Writing and recording ==
The song was written by Lady Antebellum in collaboration with the songwriter busbee. Busbee told HitQuarters that the song composition first began with the piano riff, which he had come up with at the studio while waiting for the trio to attend a writing session they had booked together. On arrival Charles Kelley responded enthusiastically to the idea and work then got underway in fleshing out the riff into a song. When "Our Kind of Love" was completed the same day the group told busbee that they thought the song was good enough to be a single for them. The music video was directed by Chris Hicky.

== Content ==
The lyrics discuss the kind of relationship a couple has as they go through life, they keep it fresh and fun and don’t take themselves too seriously. They describe their love as "just like drivin' on an open highway/ never knowing what we're gonna find." It is a mid-tempo to up-tempo song in the key of C-sharp minor.

== Music video ==
The music video was directed by Chris Hicky and filmed in a junkyard in Las Vegas, as well as Los Angeles. In the beginning of the video it shows a young man and young woman meeting for the first time, which proceeds to them talking on the phone with each other and then going out on dates. The last place the guy takes her to is at this junk yard filled with old amusement park rides. There are cut to performance shots of Lady Antebellum performing at the same junk yard.

== Critical reception ==
The song received mainly mixed reviews. Matt Bjorke of Roughstock stated that "'Our Kind of Love' recalls both the trio's debut album's hits (like 'Love Don't Live Here' and 'Lookin' For A Good Time') and the other more textured stuff found on the double platinum Need You Now, the single features an interesting sonic soundscape and finds Charles Kelley getting his first 'lead' of the singles from this album and like moody title tune, this one comes off as a true duet".

Jonathan Keefe with Slant gave it a negative rating, stating that it "sound[s] more like demo recordings than the work of a major label act with designs on superstardom."

== Chart performance ==
The song debuted at number 80 on the Billboard Hot 100 as a digital-only single. Upon its release as an official single it re-entered the chart at number 94 and became their fourth consecutive number one country single.

Chart (2010)	Peak position
Canada (Canadian Hot 100)	61
Canada Country (Billboard)	1
US Billboard Hot 100	51
US Hot Country Songs (Billboard)	1

=== Year-end charts ===
Chart (2010)	Position
US Country Songs (Billboard)	17
