= Great Hall of the People =

Legislative meeting place in Beijing

- 人民大会堂
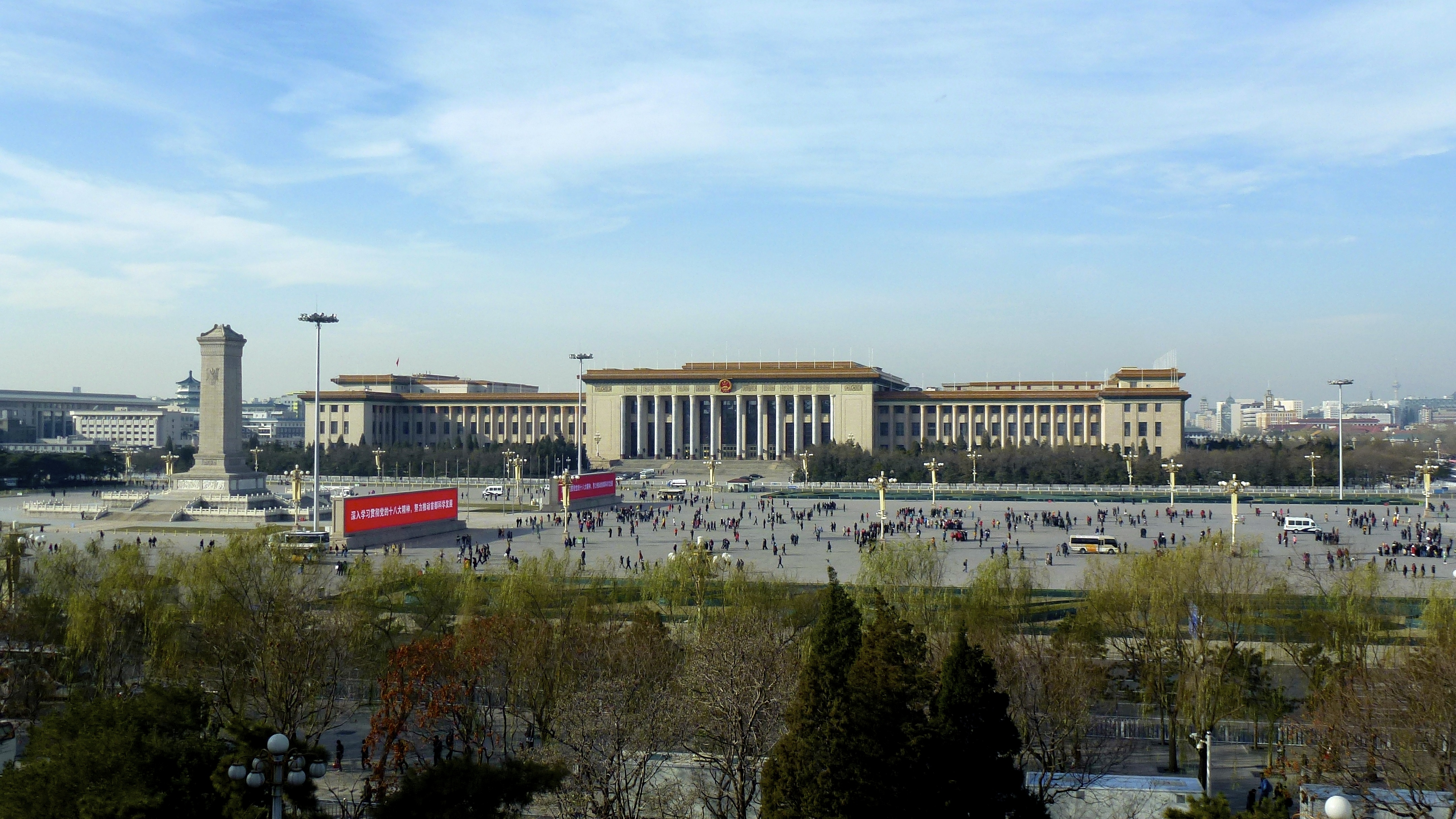
- The Great Hall of the People, facing the Monument to the People's Heroes.
- Interactive map of the Great Hall of the People area

General information
- Location: Renda Huitang West Road; Tiananmen Square, Xicheng, Beijing, China
- Coordinates: 39°54′12″N 116°23′15″E
- Current tenants: National People's Congress
- Opened: September 1959; 66 years ago

Chinese name
- Simplified Chinese: 人民大会堂
- Traditional Chinese: 人民大會堂
- Literal meaning: People's Great Assembly Hall
Transcriptions
Standard Mandarin
- Hanyu Pinyin: Rénmín Dàhuìtáng [ɻə̌nmǐn tâxwêɪtʰǎŋ]
- Gwoyeu Romatzyh: Renmin Dahhueytarng
- Wade–Giles: Jenmin Tahuit'ang

The Great Hall of the People is a state building situated to the west of Tiananmen Square in Beijing. It is used for legislative and ceremonial activities by the government of China. The People's Great Hall functions as the meeting place for the full sessions of China's supreme state organ of power, the National People's Congress, which occurs every year during March along with the national session of the Chinese People's Political Consultative Conference, a political advisory body. The Great Hall is also the meeting place of the National Congress of the Chinese Communist Party, which, since the 12th conference in 1982, has occurred once every five years, and the party's Central Committee which meets approximately once a year.

The Hall is also used for many special events, including national level meetings of various social and political organizations, large anniversary celebrations, as well as the memorial services for former leaders. The Great Hall of the People is also a popular attraction in the city frequented by tourists visiting the capital.

== History ==
In the early 1940s in Yan'an, Mao Zedong pledged that after the success of the revolution, he would build a conference hall "for ten thousand" where the Party and the people could come together to discuss important issues.

After the first Five-year plans of China was completed ahead of schedule in 1956, the Central Committee of the Chinese Communist Party began to consider building a larger auditorium in Beijing. At the Beidaihe meeting in late August 1958, the CCP Central Committee decided to build a number of major architectural projects in Beijing including the Great Hall of Ten Thousand People, and requested that it be put into use in October 1959 before the tenth anniversary of the founding of the People's Republic of China.

On September 5, 1958, Wan Li, the vice mayor of Beijing, conveyed the central government on the preparations for the 10th Anniversary. Beijing immediately set up by Feng Peizhi responsible for the National Day Project Design Leading Group and by Zhang Bo as the chief architect of the Great Hall Design Group, in a very short period of time selected the design of the Great Hall of the eight programs, and in a wide range of opinions on the basis of Tsinghua University, Beijing Municipal Bureau of Planning Administration Design Institute (President Shen Bo), Beijing Municipal Bureau of Planning Administration, to draft a comprehensive program respectively. In early September 1958, the Beijing Municipal Planning Bureau determined that the Great Hall of Ten Thousand People and the Museum of Revolutionary History would be located on both sides of Tiananmen Square.

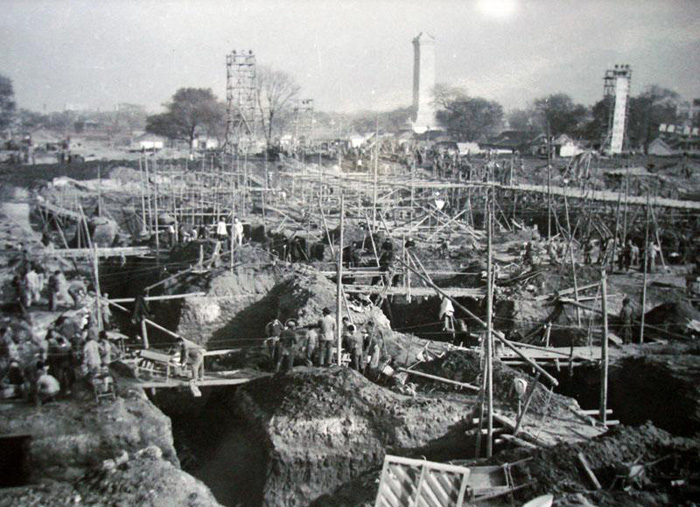
Great Hall of the People under construction in 1959

In the early morning of September 9, 1959, Mao Zedong, Chairman of the CCP Central Committee, visited the construction site. During the visit, Wan Li, the vice mayor of Beijing, suggested that the Great Hall of the People had not yet been officially named. After some discussion, Mao finalized the name "Great Hall of the People". In that night, the Great Hall was fully completed and put into use, and Mei Lanfang performed the Drunken Beauty (贵妃醉酒) in the 10,000-strong auditorium to show his condolences to the construction troops.

The Great Hall of the People was opened in September 1959 as one of the "Ten Great Constructions" completed for the 10th Anniversary of the PRC. The decision to build the Hall was made by the politburo in August 1958. Zhou Enlai believed the final design should give the message that "the people are the masters of the country". After design proposals were submitted, a group of architects from across the country chose the winning design by Zhao Dongri and Shen Qi. Zhang Bo was appointed as the chief architect. The construction took 10 months, 7,785 workers and was fashioned with military-like strategies that emulated the Great Leap Forward. Anshan Iron and Steel (Angang) produced the steel for the building's banquet and conference halls.

On December 19, 2007, approved by the Beijing Municipal People's Government, the Beijing Municipal Planning Commission and the Beijing Municipal Bureau of Cultural Relics included the Great Hall of the People building in the List of Beijing Outstanding Modern and Contemporary Architectures (北京优秀近现代建筑保护名录).

== Description ==
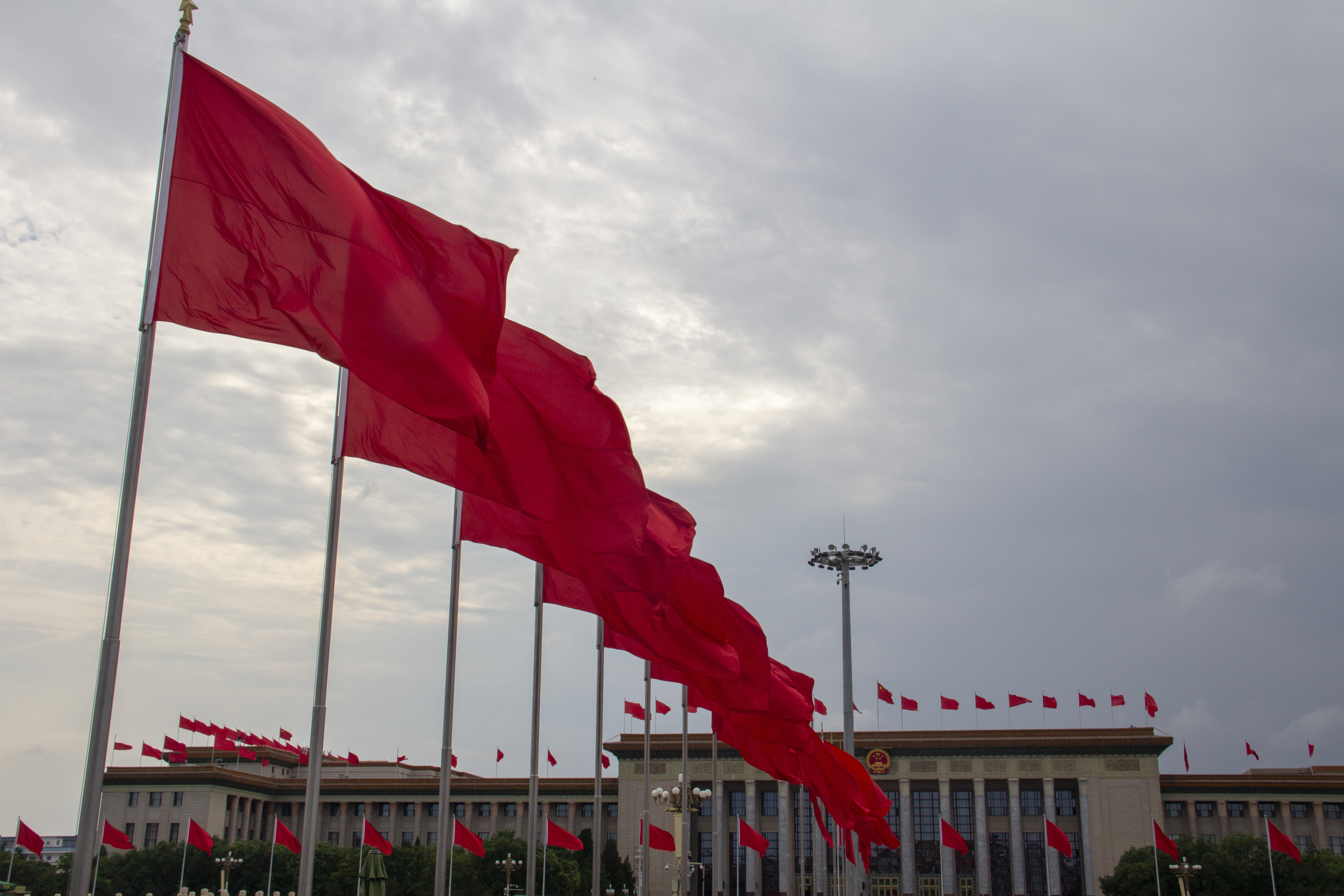
Red flags in the front of the Great Hall of the People.

Designed to symbolize the national unity and ethnic equality of the nation, the Great Hall embodied the new Chinese character of time in its features, proportion and details. The building covers 171,801 square meters (1,849,250 sq ft) of floor space, it is 356 meters (1,168 ft) in length and 206.5 meters (677 ft) in width. The centre's highest point reaches 46.5 meters (153 ft). At the eaves of the main gate hangs the national emblem of the PRC.

The Great Hall of the People consists of three sections.

1. The central section principally includes the Great Auditorium, the Main Auditorium, the Congress Hall (Standing Committee of SCPCC meets in conference), the Central Hall, the Golden Hall and other main halls.
2. The northern section consists of the State Banquet Hall, the Salute State Guest Hall, the North Hall, the East Hall, the West Hall and other large halls.
3. The southern part is the office building of the Standing Committee of the National People's Congress.

Among them, the central hall covers an area of 3,600 square meters. The retaining walls and floor are paved with colored marble. There are 20 white marble pillars around. There is a 12-meter (39 ft 4 in)-wide corridor on the middle floor. There are 6 main entrances leading to the Great Hall of Ten Thousands.

Each province, special administrative region, autonomous region of China has its own hall in the Great Hall, such as Beijing Hall, Hong Kong Hall and Hainan Hall. Each hall has the unique characteristics of the province and is furnished according to the local style.

Upon its completion, the Great Hall became China's largest auditorium which had previously been the Sun Yat-sen Auditorium. The Great Auditorium, with volume of 90,000 cubic meters (3,200,000 cu ft), seats 3,693 in the lower floor, 3,515 in the balcony, 2,518 in the gallery and 300 to 500 on the dais. Government leaders make their speeches; and the representatives do much of their business. It can simultaneously seat 10,000 representatives. The ceiling is decorated with a galaxy of lights, with a large red star is at the centre of the ceiling, and a pattern of a water waves nearby represents the people. The stars and the pattern symbolize the unity of the Chinese people around the Chinese Communist Party. The auditorium's facilities equipped with audio-visual and other systems adaptable to a variety of meeting types and sizes. A simultaneous interpretation system is also provided with a language booth.

The State Banquet Hall with an area of 7,000 square meters (75,000 sq ft) can entertain 7,000 guests, and up to 5,000 people can dine at one time (as was done on the occasion of Richard Nixon's 1972 visit to China). Smaller gatherings can be held in the Main Auditorium, with larger groups having the use of one or more of the conference halls, such as Golden Hall and North Hall, and the smallest assemblies accommodated in one or more of the over 30 conference halls that are named after provinces and regions in China.

== Usage ==
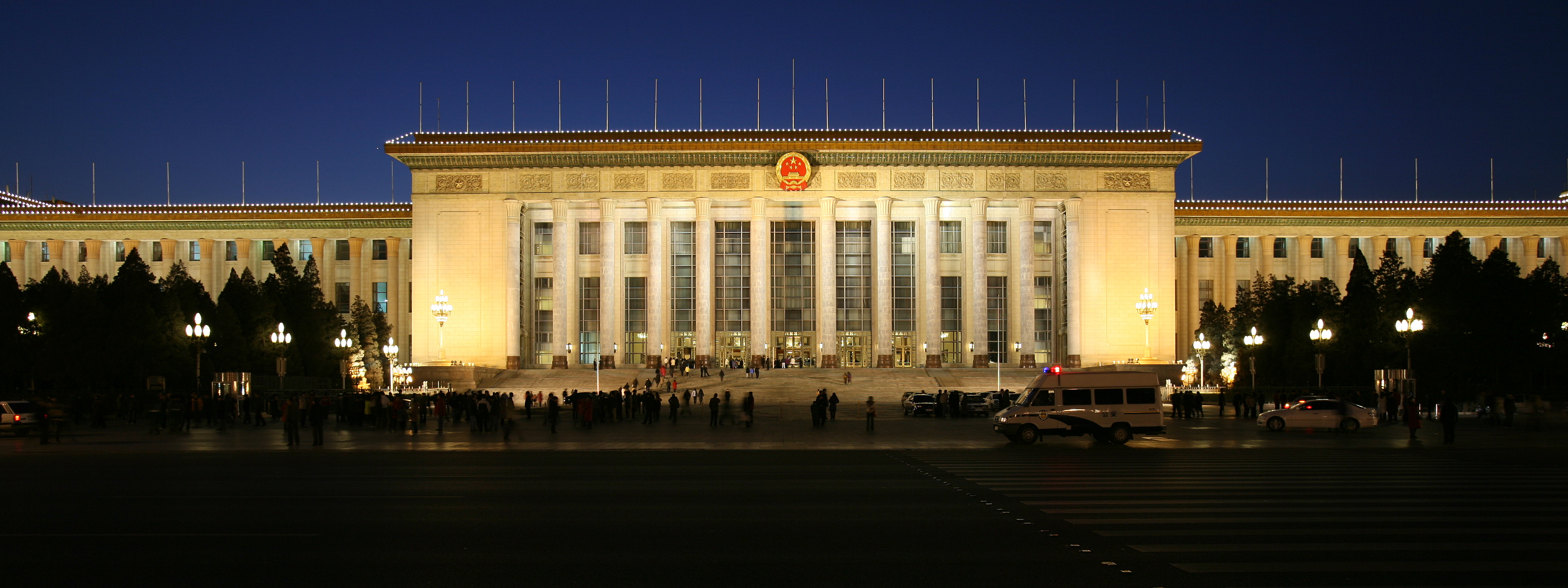
Façade of the Great Hall of the People at night.

The Great Hall of the People is the political hub of Beijing and home of the National People's Congress. Every year, in March, the Great Hall of the People plays host to the liang hui (literally means "two meetings") event, where both the Chinese People's Political Consultative Conference (CPPCC) and the National People's Congress (NPC) meet in sessions lasting for two to three weeks at the Great Auditorium. The Chinese Communist Party (CCP) also holds its National Congress every five years in the Great Hall of the People.

After the Great Hall of the People was built in 1959, it was open to the public for one or two days every week. After the outbreak of the Cultural Revolution, the Great Hall of the People was closed and used only for large-scale meetings and the offices of central leaders, receiving activities. The issue of opening the Great Hall of the People to the public was brought up again after Cultural Revolution. At the evening of January 27, 1979, Deng Yingchao, on behalf of the CCP Central Committee, announced that "the Great Hall of the People will be open to the masses." From July 15, the Great Hall of the People was reopened to the public. Since then it has eased the pressure on its finances by charging admission fees for visiting the hall and by generating income from the kiosks. Subsequently, by the end of the 1980s it had become self-supporting in terms of administrative expenses.

The Great Hall has been used for meetings with foreign dignitaries on state or working visits, as well as large anniversary celebrations attended by top leaders.

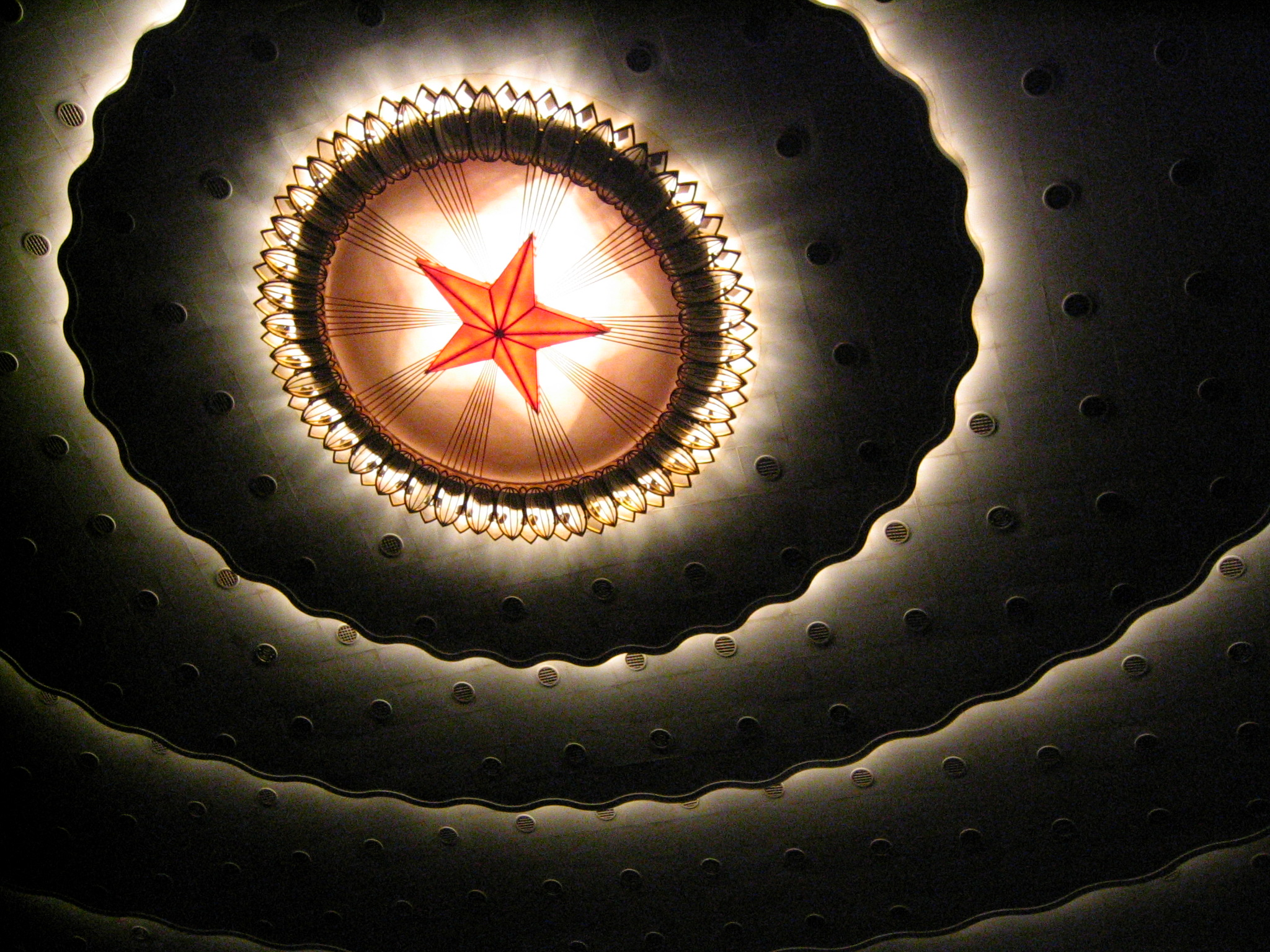
Ceiling of The Auditorium of Ten Thousand People.

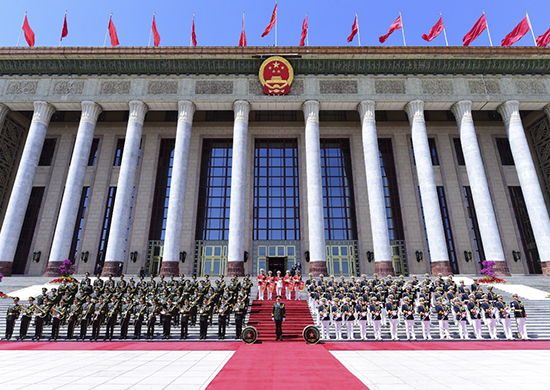
The Central Military Band of the People's Liberation Army of China at the Great Hall of the People. The band plays an important role in the ceremonial protocol that occurs in the hall.

The Great Hall has been used for the state funerals and memorial services for several top leaders. In 1982 Former President Liu Shaoqi was granted a state funeral held at the Great Hall. The Great Hall also held the funerals of General Secretary Hu Yaobang in 1989, as well as the state funerals for paramount leader Deng Xiaoping in 1997, and Jiang Zemin in 2022. (Mao Zedong's funeral ceremony was not held at the Great Hall; it was held at Tiananmen Square.)

The building and its main "Great Auditorium" are open to the public as a tourist attraction when it is not in use. Some non-political conventions and concerts have also been held in the Great Hall. On July 4, 1986, tenor singer Luciano Pavarotti held a solo concert in the Great Hall of the People, becoming the first foreigner, and westerner, to perform in the Great Hall of the People.

In October 2003, Riverdance, the Irish music and dance entertainment phenomenon, was the first show from the West to perform in the Great Hall of the People, Beijing, with eleven sold-out performances. In January 2009, American country music trio Lucy Angel became the first American group to be invited to perform at the Great Hall of the People, doing so before an audience of dignitaries and government officials.

== See also ==
- National Assembly Building (Beijing)
- Politics of the People's Republic of China
- State Kremlin Palace, Moscow
- United States Capitol
