= Good, Bad & Pretty Things =

Studio album by Jessie Farrell
- Released: October 6, 2009
- Genre: Country
- Length: 45:37
- Label: 604
- Producer: Victoria Shaw

Jessie Farrell chronology
Nothing Fancy (2007)	Good, Bad & Pretty Things (2009)	Love Letter (2011)

Singles from Good, Bad & Pretty Things
- 1. "You Make Me Feel" Released: June 29, 2009; 2. "Nobody Says No" Released: November 9, 2009; 3. "Heart of Gold" Released: March 22, 2010

Good, Bad & Pretty Things is the third studio album by Canadian country music artist Jessie Farrell. It was released on October 6, 2009, by 604. The album's first single is "You Make Me Feel".

== Track listing ==
No.	Title	Length
1.	"You Make Me Feel"	3:28
2.	"Burn So Bright"	4:06
3.	"Sober"	3:49
4.	"Nobody Says No"	3:31
5.	"Cha Ching"	3:17
6.	"Your Fantasy"	3:49
7.	"Heart of Gold"	3:15
8.	"Roadside Sandwich"	4:10
9.	"Fried"	2:28
10.	"Not in Kansas"	4:00
11.	"Lavender Tea"	3:22
12.	"New Ways to Love"	3:01

== Personnel ==
- Eddie Bayers - drums, percussion
- Bruce Bouton - lap steel guitar, pedal steel guitar
- Gary Burr - acoustic guitar, resonator guitar
- Jessie Farrell - lead vocals, background vocals
- Kevin Haynie - banjo
- Brent Mason - electric guitar
- Michael Rhodes - bass guitar
- Mike Rojas - accordion, Hammond B-3 organ, keyboards
- Jonathan Yudkin - fiddle, mandolin
