= Nothing Fancy =

Studio album by Jessie Farrell
- Released: October 9, 2007
- Genre: Country
- Length: 35:11
- Label: 604
- Producer: Chad Carlson; Garth Fundis; Jared Kuemper

Jessie Farrell chronology
Today (2002)	Nothing Fancy (2007)	Good, Bad & Pretty Things (2009)

Nothing Fancy is the second studio album by Canadian country music singer Jessie Farrell. It was released on October 9, 2007 by 604. "Let's Talk About Love," "Fell Right Into You," "Best of Me" and "I Guess" have all been released as singles.

== Track listing ==
1. "Let's Talk About Love" (Jessie Farrell, Jesse Tucker) – 3:31
2. "I Guess" (Farrell, Tucker) – 2:46
3. "Fell Right Into You" (Farrell, Tucker) – 4:13
4. "Best of Me" (Farrell, Jared Kuemper, Tucker) – 4:28
5. "Lucky" (Farrell, Tucker) – 2:44
6. "Sorry for You" (Farrell, Tucker) – 3:20
7. "Falling Asleep (In Your Arms)" (Farrell, Tucker, Jim Vallance) – 4:13
8. "Prettiest Things" (Farrell, Tucker) – 3:17
9. "I Am a Rock" (Farrell, Tucker) – 2:57
10. "Coming Home (Jono's Song)" (Farrell, Tucker) – 3:42

== Personnel ==
- Steve Dawson - banjo, dobro
- John Dymond - bass guitar
- Jessie Farrell - acoustic guitar, lead vocals, background vocals
- Paul Franklin - pedal steel guitar
- Shannon Gaye - background vocals
- Rob Hajacos - fiddle
- Jared Kuemper - keyboards, string arrangements, background vocals
- Brent Mason - electric guitar
- Steve O'Connor - Fender Rhodes, organ, piano, Wurlitzer
- Jesse Zubot - fiddle, mandolin
