= Love Letter (Jessie Farrell album) =

Studio album by Jessie Farrell
- Released: August 30, 2011
- Genre: Country
- Length: 46:33
- Label: 604

Jessie Farrell chronology
Good, Bad & Pretty Things (2009)	Love Letter (2011)	Take Me Outside (2015)

Singles from Love Letter
- 1. "Turn You Down" Released: June 27, 2011; 2. "Everything to Me" Released: January 9, 2012

Love Letter is the fourth studio album by Canadian country music artist Jessie Farrell. It was released on August 30, 2011, by 604 Records. The album's first single is "Turn You Down."

== Track listing ==
No.	Title	Length
1.	"Catch Me"	2:39
2.	"Love Letter"	3:44
3.	"Sunny Days"	3:35
4.	"Turn You Down"	3:48
5.	"Everything to Me"	4:11
6.	"Case of Love"	3:03
7.	"Filthy Habits"	3:47
8.	"Making Ends Meet"	3:46
9.	"Fall"	3:22
10.	"Love Never Ends"	4:09
11.	"Let's Talk About Love" (acoustic version)	3:28
12.	"Fell Right Into You" (acoustic version)	4:13
13.	"I Guess" (acoustic version)	2:48
