= American Honey =

Single by Lady Antebellum

from the album Need You Now
- Released: January 11, 2010
- Genre: Country
- Length: 3:44 (album version); 3:29 (single version)
- Label: Capitol Nashville
- Songwriters: Cary Barlowe; Hillary Lindsey; Shane Stevens
- Producers: Lady Antebellum; Paul Worley

Lady Antebellum singles chronology
"Need You Now" (2009)	"American Honey" (2010)	"Our Kind of Love" (2010)

Music video
- "American Honey" on YouTube

"American Honey" is a song written by Cary Barlowe, Hillary Lindsey, and Shane Stevens, and recorded by American country music group Lady Antebellum. It was released on January 11, 2010, as the second single from their second album Need You Now. The group's fifth single overall, it debuted on the US Billboard Hot Country Songs charts dated for January 2, 2010, and it features lead vocals from Scott.

== Content ==
The song's female narrator, lead singer Hillary Scott, states a desire to escape her adult lifestyle and return to her childhood, which is described in the lyrics as "American honey." It is in D-flat major, with an approximate tempo of 84 beats per minute. The guitars use DADGAD or Celtic tuning decreased by a semitone, and the chords are in a pattern of D ♭ - B ♭m7 - G ♭ - E ♭m - D ♭ on the verses, and G ♭ - D ♭ - B ♭m7 - A ♭ three times on the chorus.

== Critical reception ==
The song received mainly negative reviews. Matt Bjorke of Roughstock stated that "after one listen [he doesn't] see how this single can fail," but criticized the production by saying that he thought the drum machine was too loud. Kevin John Coyne of Country Universe gave the song a D rating, saying that the "song isn't sung well" and "certainly not interesting enough to warrant suffering through the painful mediocrity of the lead vocal." Engine 145 reviewer Blake Boldt gave it a thumbs-down, referring to the lyric as "a lazy depiction of a chaste young lass chasing after a fuzzy memory" and calling Scott's vocal "sad and pensive and the slightest bit off-pitch against a distracting drumbeat."

== Music video ==
The video was directed by Trey Fanjoy and was filmed at Disney's Golden Oak Ranch.

=== Synopsis ===
The video shows Hillary, Charles and Dave looking back at their younger selves. When Hillary lies in the grass and walks through clothes lines she looks back at her younger self running and dancing through a field and playing through clothes lines. Charles who is sitting by a pond looks back to his young self spending time with a girl he likes. As Dave walks along a dirt path he sees him riding a bike he was younger on that same path. Starting with the first chorus there are cut to shots of all three of them sitting on a porch singing the song at night.

== In popular culture ==
The song features prominently in a pivotal scene in the 2016 Andrea Arnold film of the same name.

== Chart performance ==
"American Honey" debuted at number 47 on the U.S. Billboard Hot Country Songs chart for the week of January 2, 2010, before its initial release date of January 11, 2010. It also became their third number 1 hit, as well as their third consecutive. It has been certified platinum for sales exceeding 1,000,000 units.

=== Weekly charts ===
Chart (2010)	Peak position
Canada Hot 100 (Billboard)	50
Canada Country (Billboard)	1
US Billboard Hot 100	25
US Hot Country Songs (Billboard)	1

=== Year-end charts ===
Chart (2010)	Peak position
US Billboard Hot 100	94
US Country Songs (Billboard)	12
