= In Full View =

Studio album by Victoria Shaw
- Released: August 8, 1995
- Recorded: 1994–1995
- Genre: Country
- Length: 35:51
- Label: Reprise
- Producers: Andy Byrd; Jim Ed Norman

Victoria Shaw chronology
In Full View (1995)	Victoria Shaw (1997)

Professional ratings
Review scores
Source	Rating
AllMusic	3/5 stars

In Full View is the debut album by American country singer-songwriter Victoria Shaw, released on August 8, 1995, by Reprise Records.

Of the 11 tracks on the album, Shaw co-wrote the first ten (two of those ten with pop songwriter Desmond Child), and wrote the last one by herself. Multi award-winning and multi-platinum recording artist Garth Brooks provides backing vocals on the track "Tears Dry".

Four singles were released from the album ("Cry Wolf", "Tears Dry", "Forgiveness", "(A Day in the Life of a) Single Mother"), and all of them placed very low on the Billboard Hot Country Songs chart (57, 74 and 58 for the first three; the last one failed to chart).

== Track listing ==
No.	Title	Writer(s)	Length
1.	"Lucky Me Lucky You"	Victoria Shaw; Andy Byrd	3:01
2.	"Love On Down the Line"	Shaw; Bob DiPiero	2:37
3.	"Forgiveness"	Shaw; DiPiero	3:31
4.	"Good as Gone"	Shaw; Rob Crosby	3:17
5.	"You Don't Know Love"	Shaw; Byrd	3:30
6.	"Bring My Baby Home"	Shaw; Ken Meeker	3:01
7.	"Cry Wolf"	Shaw; Jess Leary	2:55
8.	"(A Day in the Life of a) Single Mother"	Shaw; Desmond Child	3:04
9.	"Tears Dry"	Shaw; Jon Vezner	3:07
10.	"Where Your Road Leads"	Shaw; Child	3:26
11.	"Small Talk"	Shaw	4:22
Total length:			35:51

== Personnel ==
Adapted from the album's liner notes.

=== Musicians ===
- Victoria Shaw – vocals (all tracks), backing vocals (tracks 1, 5, 6), piano (track 11)
- Eddie Bayers – drums (tracks 2–6, 8, 10)
- Bruce Bouton – steel guitar (tracks 5, 9, 10), Dobro (track 7)
- Mike Brignardello – bass guitar (track 7)
- Garth Brooks – backing vocals (track 9)
- Pat Buchanan – electric 12 string guitar (track 1)
- Gary Burr – backing vocals (tracks 1–3, 7)
- Chad Cromwell – drums (tracks 1, 7)
- Billy Dean – backing vocals (track 10)
- Glen Duncan – mandolin (track 1)
- Sonny Garrish – steel guitar (tracks 2–4, 6, 8)
- Steve Gibson – electric guitar (tracks 5, 10)
- Tony Harrell – piano (tracks 1, 7)
- Steve Hinson – steel guitar (track 1)
- John Hobbs – piano (tracks 2, 3), electric piano (track 6)
- David Hungate – bass guitar (track 9), backing vocals
- John Jorgenson – electric guitar solo (track 5)
- Jeff King – electric guitar (track 1)
- Jess Leary – acoustic guitar (track 7), backing vocals (tracks 1–5, 7, 8)
- Paul Leim – drums (track 9)
- Mark Luna – backing vocals (tracks 1–3, 5)
- Terry McMillan – harmonica (track 7), percussion (tracks 7, 9, 10)
- Bob Mason – cello (track 11)
- Brent Mason – electric guitar (tracks 4, 8)
- Steve Nathan – piano (tracks 4, 5, 8, 10), keyboards (track 10)
- Jim Ed Norman – string arrangement (track 11)
- Bobby Ogdin – piano (track 9)
- Danny Parks – electric guitar (track 7)
- Jim Photoglo – backing vocals (tracks 4, 8)
- Dave Pomeroy – bass guitar (track 1)
- Michael Rhodes – bass guitar (tracks 2–6, 8, 10)
- Brent Rowan – electric guitar (tracks 2, 3, 6)
- Michael Spriggs – acoustic guitar (tracks 1, 5, 7)
- Karen Staley – backing vocals (track 7)
- Harry Stinson – backing vocals (tracks 4, 8)
- Biff Watson – acoustic guitar (tracks 2–4, 6, 8–10), classical guitar (track 11)
- John Willis – electric guitar (tracks 9, 10)

=== Technical ===
- Andy Byrd – producer, engineer (tracks 5, 7, 9, 10)
- Jim Ed Norman – producer
- Scott Huerman – product manager
- Terry Christian – mixing (tracks 1–6, 8)
- Chris Lord-Alge – mixing (tracks 7, 9, 10)
- John Dickson – mixing (track 11), engineer (tracks 2–11)
- Pat Hutchinson – engineer (track 1)
- Patrick Kelly – engineer (track 9)
- Keith Robichaux – engineer (tracks 4, 8)
- Craig White – engineer (track 9)
- Mark Capps – second engineer (tracks 2, 3, 5, 6, 10, 11)
- Fred Mercer – second engineer (tracks 5, 7, 9, 10)
- Neal Merrick – second engineer (track 7)
- Aaron Swihart – second engineer (track 9)
- John Thomas II – second engineer (track 9)
- Denny Purcell – mastering
- Recorded at Sound Shop (all tracks), Warner-Chappell (track 1), Sound Stage (tracks 4, 8, 9), The Loft (tracks 5, 7, 9, 10), Imagine (track 7), Omni (track 9), Image Recording (tracks 9, 10)
- Laura LiPuma-Nash – art direction
- Garrett Rittenberry – design
- Randee St. Nicholas – photography
- Kim Johnson – hair & make up
- Gary Berkowitz – hair & make up

== Charts ==
Singles – Billboard (North America)

Year	Single	Chart	Peak position
1994	"Cry Wolf"	Hot Country Songs	57
1994	"Tears Dry"	Hot Country Songs	74
1995	"Forgiveness"	Hot Country Songs	58
