= I Run to You =

2009 single by Lady Antebellum

Single by Lady Antebellum

from the album Lady Antebellum and Need You Now (International Edition)
- Released: January 26, 2009
- Genre: Country pop
- Length: 4:16 (album version); 3:49 (radio edit)
- Label: Capitol Nashville; Parlophone
- Songwriters: Hillary Scott; Charles Kelley; Dave Haywood; Tom Douglas
- Producers: Victoria Shaw; Paul Worley

Lady Antebellum singles chronology
"Lookin' for a Good Time" (2008)	"I Run to You" (2009)	"Need You Now" (2009)

Alternative cover
- International edition art cover.

Music video
- "I Run to You" (Version 1) on YouTube "I Run to You" (Version 2) on YouTube

"I Run to You" is a song recorded by American country music group Lady Antebellum. It was released on January 26, 2009, as the third and final single from the group's self-titled debut album. Hillary Scott, Charles Kelley and Dave Haywood, who comprise Lady Antebellum, co-wrote the song with Tom Douglas. "I Run to You" is the group's first number-one single, reaching that peak in July 2009, and it features lead vocals from both Scott and Kelley.

The song won the 2009 CMA Single of the Year Award on November 11, 2009. It won the Grammy Award for Best Country Performance by a Duo or Group with Vocal and was also nominated for a Grammy Award for Best Country Song on December 2, 2009, but lost to Taylor Swift's "White Horse".

In the UK and Europe, "I Run to You" was the second single taken from their Need You Now album. It was released on August 9, 2010, in support of their debut UK live show at Shepherd's Bush Empire. The single made the A-list playlist on BBC Radio 2.

== Content ==
"I Run to You" is a mid-tempo with electric guitar and string section accompaniment. In it, the narrators — lead singers Charles Kelley and Hillary Scott — claim that they turn to each other to escape the negativity and prejudice of the world.

== Critical reception ==
Brady Vercher of Engine 145 gave the song a "thumbs down" review, calling it "a vague profession of love" and adding, "The song comes across as purposefully cryptic because they either didn’t fully develop the idea, haven’t become comfortable opening up in their lyrics, or they just didn’t feel the need to focus on the lyric other than as a device to support the melody." Dan Milliken of Country Universe gave the song a B grade, saying that it "rolls sweetly along and never tries to sound more important than it really is".

Paul Worley, who co-produced the album and played guitar on it, said, "The song is an expression against hate, prejudice, negativity, running the rat race, but ultimately the redemption of love! And it has an irresistible melody and a head-bobbing groove. What could be better?"

== Chart performance ==
"I Run to You" debuted at number 50 on the U.S. Billboard Hot Country Songs chart dated January 31, 2009. After spending 26 weeks on the chart, the song became the trio's first number one hit for the week of July 25, 2009. The song has also become Lady Antebellum's first top 40 on the Billboard Hot 100, where it peaked at number 27. On the Billboard Year-End charts, "I Run to You" was ranked as the number 1 country single of 2009. It also debuted at number 39 on the U.S. Billboard Hot Adult Top 40 Tracks charts for the week of July 17, 2010. It also debuted at number 27 on the U.S. Billboard Adult Contemporary Tracks charts for the week of September 4, 2010.

It was certified 2× Platinum by the Recording Industry Association of America (RIAA) on April 29, 2013 for digital sales of 2,000,000 copies.

== Music video ==
A music video, directed by Adam Boatman, was released for the song in March 2009. The video follows a chain of events, which depicts how one good deed leads to another. It begins with a mother giving money to a man playing guitar on the sidewalk, who walks into a coffee shop and loans money to a businessman who left his wallet at home. The businessman then helps a woman pick up her stack of papers that scatters when she falls over. Later, the woman takes a seat on the bench and waits for the bus. The mother from the beginning arrives at the bus stop and she gives up her seat for her. Included with these are scenes of the trio singing in a small hotel room.

A second video for the European release of "I Run to You" was shot and debuted on their record label Parlophone's YouTube page on July 30, 2010. This alternate video was directed by Christopher Sims.

== Cover versions ==
- Kian Egan, formerly of Westlife, covered this song in a duet with his wife, Jodi Albert, on his 2014 debut solo album Home.

== Formats and track listings ==
Digital download

1. "I Run to You" - 4:16

US digital download — single (Acoustic)

1. "I Run to You" (Live) - 3:49

European digital download — single

1. "I Run to You" - 4:18
2. "I Run to You" (Live at The Ryman) - 5:01

== Personnel ==
The following musicians perform on this track:

- John Catchings – cello
- Chad Cromwell – drums
- David Davidson – violin
- Jason "Slim" Gambill – electric guitar
- Jim Grosjean – viola
- Dave Haywood – electric guitar, acoustic guitar, background vocals
- Charles Kelley – lead vocals
- Rob McNelley – electric guitar
- Sari Reist – cello
- Michael Rojas – Hammond B-3 organ, synthesizer
- Hillary Scott – lead vocals
- Pamela Sixfin – violin
- Mary Kathryn Vanosdale – violin
- Kristin Wilkinson – viola
- Karen Winkelman – violin
- Paul Worley – electric guitar
- Craig Young – bass guitar
- Kristin Wilkinson - strings

== Charts ==
=== Weekly charts ===
Chart (2009–2010)	Peak position
Canada Hot 100 (Billboard)	54
Canada AC (Billboard)	17
Canada Country (Billboard)	1
UK Singles (OCC)	118
US Billboard Hot 100	27
US Hot Country Songs (Billboard)	1
US Adult Contemporary (Billboard)	14
US Adult Pop Airplay (Billboard)	15

=== Year-end charts ===
Chart (2009)	Position
US Billboard Hot 100	90
US Hot Country Songs (Billboard)	1

Chart (2010)	Position
US Adult Contemporary (Billboard)	43
US Adult Pop Songs (Billboard)	39

== Certifications ==
Region	Certification	Certified units/sales
United States (RIAA)	2× Platinum	2,000,000^{^}
^{^} Shipments figures based on certification alone.

== Release history ==
Region	Date	Format	Label	Ref.
United States	January 26, 2009	Country radio	Capitol Nashville	
United States	July 21, 2009	Digital download (Acoustic)	Capitol Nashville	
United States	June 29, 2010	Contemporary hit radio	Capitol Nashville	
United States	July 1, 2010	Adult contemporary	Capitol Nashville / Capitol	
United States	July 1, 2010	Hot adult contemporary	Capitol Nashville / Capitol	
Europe	August 9, 2010	Digital download	Capitol Nashville, Parlophone	
