= Lady Antebellum (album) =

Studio album by Lady Antebellum
- Released: April 15, 2008
- Genre: Country
- Length: 42:44
- Label: Capitol Nashville
- Producers: Victoria Shaw; Paul Worley

Lady Antebellum chronology
Lady Antebellum (2008)	Need You Now (2010)

Singles from Lady Antebellum
- 1. "Love Don't Live Here" Released: October 2, 2007; 2. "Love's Lookin' Good On You" Released: February 17, 2008; 3. "Lookin' for a Good Time" Released: June 9, 2008; 4. "I Run to You" Released: January 26, 2009

Professional ratings
Review scores
Source	Rating
Allmusic	3.5/5 stars
Country Weekly	4/5 stars
Country Standard Time	favorable
Slant	3/5 stars
About.com	4.5/5 stars

Lady Antebellum is the debut album by American country music trio Lady Antebellum. It was released on April 15, 2008, through Capitol Nashville. The production on the album was handled by Victoria Shaw and Paul Worley. The album was supported by three singles: "Love Don't Live Here", "Lookin' for a Good Time" and "I Run to You", which became the group's first number one on the US Hot Country Songs chart.

Lady Antebellum received generally positive reviews from music critics and was also a commercial success. The album debuted at four on the US Billboard 200 chart, selling 43,000 copies in its first week. The album also debuted at number one on the US Top Country Albums chart, becoming the first debut by a country group to achieve this. It also received a nomination for Album of the Year at the 2010 Academy of Country Music Awards.

== Singles ==
Its lead-off single, "Love Don't Live Here", was released in late 2007 and entered the Top 5 on the Billboard Hot Country Songs charts in May 2008. A second single, "Lookin' for a Good Time", was issued in June 2008, and peaked at number 11. "I Run to You" followed as the third single from the album in January 2009, and became the group's first number-one single on the Hot Country Songs chart in July 2009.

== Commercial performance ==
Lady Antebellum debuted at number four on the US Billboard 200 chart, selling 43,000 copies in its first week. This became Lady Antebellum's first US top-ten debut. The album also debuted at number one on the US Top Country Albums chart. On November 10, 2010, the album was certified double platinum by the Recording Industry Association of America (RIAA) for shipments of over two million copies in the US. As of January 2011, the album has sold 1,826,368 copies in the United States.

== Track listing ==
No.	Title	Writer(s)	Length
1.	"Love Don't Live Here"	Hillary Scott; Charles Kelley; Dave Haywood	3:50
2.	"Lookin' for a Good Time"	Scott; Kelley; Haywood; Keith Follesé	3:07
3.	"All We'd Ever Need"	Scott; Kelley; Haywood	4:40
4.	"Long Gone"	Scott; Victoria Shaw; K. Follesé; Adrienne Follesé	3:34
5.	"I Run to You"	Scott; Kelley; Haywood; Tom Douglas	4:16
6.	"Love's Lookin' Good on You"	Shaw; Jason Deere; Matt Lopez	3:21
7.	"Home is Where the Heart Is"	Scott; Kelley; Haywood; Shaw	3:45
8.	"Things People Say"	Kelley; Haywood	3:50
9.	"Slow Down Sister"	Kelley; Haywood; Shaw; Jason "Slim" Gambill	3:06
10.	"Can't Take My Eyes off You"	Scott; Kelley; Haywood	4:45
11.	"One Day You Will"	Scott; Kelley; Haywood; Clay Mills	4:30
Total length:			42:44

iTunes Bonus Track
No.	Title	Writer(s)	Length
12.	"Emily"	Scott; Kelley; Haywood; Shaw	4:00

== Personnel ==
As listed in liner notes.

=== Lady Antebellum ===
- Hillary Scott – lead vocals, background vocals
- Charles Kelley – lead vocals, background vocals
- Dave Haywood – acoustic guitar, electric guitar, piano, mandolin, background vocals

=== Additional musicians ===
- David Angell – violin
- Bruce Bouton – dobro, steel guitar
- John Catchings – cello
- Chad Cromwell – drums, tambourine, shaker
- Eric Darken – percussion
- David Davidson — violin
- Larry Franklin – fiddle
- Jason "Slim" Gambill – electric guitar
- Jim Grosjean – viola

- Anthony LaMarchina — cello
- Rob McNelley – electric guitar, slide guitar
- Michael Rojas – synthesizer, piano, accordion, Hammond B-3 organ, Wurlitzer
- Victoria Shaw – background vocals
- Pamela Sixfin – violin
- Mary Kathryn Van Osdale – violin
- Brice Williams – drums
- Paul Worley – acoustic guitar, electric guitar, soloist
- Craig Young – bass guitar

Strings performed by the Nashville String Machine; conducted and arranged by Kris Wilkinson.

=== Production ===
- Natthaphol Abhigantaphand – assistant, mixing assistant
- Shelley Anderson – mastering assistant
- Denis Arguijo — art producer
- Andrew Bazinet — assistant, assistant engineer
- Joanna Carter – art direction
- Mike Casteel – copyist
- Paige Conners – production coordination
- Erik Hellerman – engineer
- Chris Hickey — photography
- Brent Kaye — assistant, mixing assistant

- Stephen Lamb — copyist
- Andrew Mendelson — mastering
- Lee Moore — stylist, wardrobe
- Clarke Schleicher – mixing engineer, string engineer
- Victoria Shaw — audio production, producer
- Andrew Southam – photography
- Gleen Sweitzer — logo design
- Matt Taylor Band – design
- Debra Williams – hair stylist, make-up
- Paul Worley – audio production, liner notes, producer

== Charts ==
=== Weekly charts ===
Chart (2008–2009)	Peak position
US Billboard 200	4
US Top Country Albums (Billboard)	1

=== Year-end charts ===
Chart (2008)	Position
US Billboard 200	134
US Top Country Albums (Billboard)	25
Chart (2009)	Position
US Billboard 200	40
US Top Country Albums (Billboard)	9
Chart (2010)	Position
US Billboard 200	25
US Top Country Albums (Billboard)	6
Chart (2011)	Position
US Top Country Albums (Billboard)	74

=== Singles ===
Year	Single	Peak chart positions		
Year	Single	US Country	US	CAN
2007	"Love Don't Live Here"	3	53	69
2008	"Lookin' for a Good Time"	11	67	—
2009	"I Run to You"	1	27	54

== Certifications ==
Region	Certification	Certified units/sales
Canada (Music Canada)	Platinum	100,000^{^}
United Kingdom (BPI)	Silver	60,000^{‡}
United States (RIAA)	2× Platinum	2,000,000^{^}
^{^} Shipments figures based on certification alone.^{‡} Sales+streaming figures based on certification alone.
