= Lookin' for a Good Time =

Single by Lady Antebellum

from the album Lady Antebellum
- Released: June 9, 2008
- Genre: Country
- Length: 3:07
- Label: Capitol Nashville
- Songwriters: Hillary Scott; Charles Kelley; Dave Haywood; Keith Follesé
- Producers: Victoria Shaw; Paul Worley

Lady Antebellum singles chronology
"Love Don't Live Here" (2007)	"Lookin' for a Good Time" (2008)	"I Run to You" (2009)

Music video
- "Lookin' for a Good Time" at CMT.com

"Lookin' for a Good Time" is a song recorded by American country music trio Lady Antebellum. It was released on June 9, 2008, as the second single from their self-titled debut studio album, as well as their second top 20 hit on the Billboard country chart. The song was co-written by the trio's three members; Hillary Scott, Charles Kelley, and Dave Haywood along with Keith Follesé, and it features lead vocals from both Scott and Kelley.

== Critical reception ==
"Lookin' for a Good Time" received a "thumbs up" review from the country music site Engine 145. Although reviewer Matt C. called the storyline "fairly pedestrian" and said that the producers "[did] their best to ruin" the song, he also made note of Kelley's "distinctive, husky voice" and the alternating lead vocals, adding "I’m not likely to confuse this group with any other artist on country radio."

The song was also distributed as a downloadable song in the game Tap Tap Revenge for the iPhone OS

== Music video ==
The music video was directed by Chris Hicky. The video shows the band performing the song on a TV show and is set in the 1950/60's based on the band and audience's clothes. One difference between the video and the album version of the song is, in the video they sing "would you get the wrong impression if I asked you to dance right now" instead of "would you get the wrong impression if I called us a cab right now".

== Credits and Personnel ==
The following musicians perform on this track:

- Chad Cromwell – drums, tambourine
- Larry Franklin – fiddle
- Jason "Slim" Gambill – electric guitar
- Dave Haywood – acoustic guitar, background vocals
- Charles Kelley – lead vocals
- Rob McNelley – electric guitar
- Michael Rojas – Hammond B-3 organ
- Hillary Scott – lead vocals
- Paul Worley – electric guitar
- Craig Young – bass guitar

== Chart performance ==
The song debuted at number 60 on the U.S. Billboard Hot Country Songs chart dated June 21, 2008 and peaked at number 11 in December 2008.

Chart (2008–2009)	Peak position
Canada Country (Billboard)	18
US Billboard Hot 100	67
US Hot Country Songs (Billboard)	11

== Awards and nominations ==
- 2010 CMT Music Awards: CMT Performance of the Year, "Lookin' For a Good Time" from the 2009 CMT Music Awards, Nominated
