= Lucy Angel =

American country music vocal group

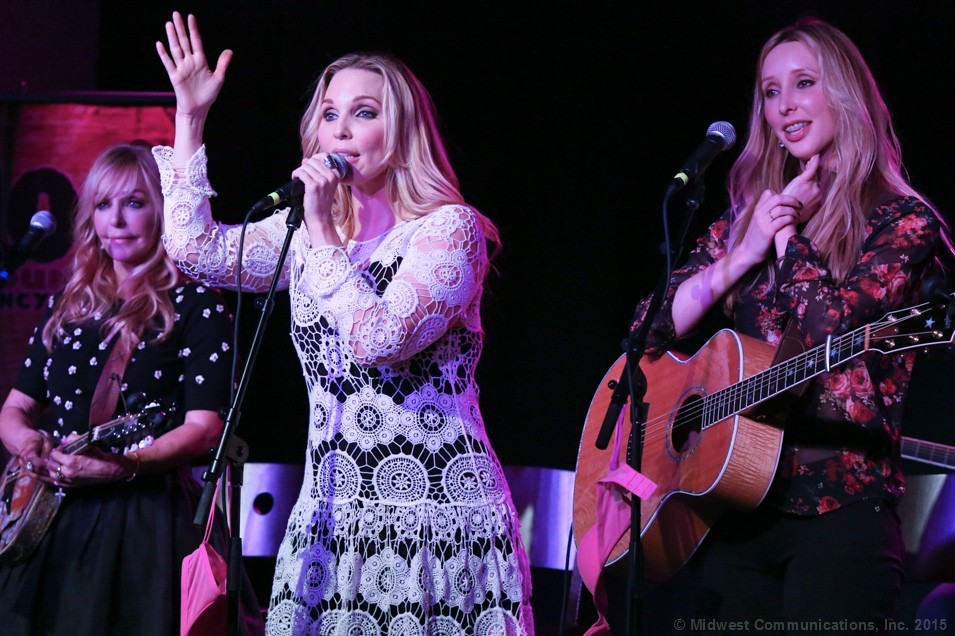
- Lucy Angel performing for Y100's Bra Country Concert on October 14th at the new "Backstage At The Meyer" in downtown Green Bay to benefit the Breast Cancer Family Foundation in 2015

Background information
- Origin: Nashville, Tennessee, USA
- Genre: Country
- Years active: 2003–2017
- Label: G-Force
- Past members: Kate Anderton; Lindsay Anderton; Emily Anderton
- Website: www.lucyangel.com

Lucy Angel was an American country music vocal group from Nashville, Tennessee. The group consisted of Kate Anderton (mandolin, vocals) and her two daughters, Lindsay (lead vocals, harmonica) and Emily (guitar, vocals). The group has charted one single, "Crazy Too", on Country Airplay.

== Music career ==
=== Early years ===
Kate first entered the world of country music when her husband entered her into a country music talent search show, the Wrangler Country Showdown (which later became the Colgate Country Showdown), which she won. Eldest daughter Lindsay started performing at age four, and by twelve had joined her mother in singing professionally. Originally from Arizona, the family moved to Nashville, Tennessee, in 2003, where Kate and Lindsay first took on the name Lucy Angel as the name of their duo. Youngest daughter Emily joined her mother and sister on the stage.

=== 2004 - Present ===
Lucy Angel's first public performance as a trio was opening for Neal McCoy. The group went on to open for headliner acts such as Taylor Swift, Montgomery Gentry and Charlie Daniels. On July 22, 2011, they performed at the Country Thunder Music Festival in Twin Lakes, Wisconsin. In 2015, Lucy Angel opened shows for Jake Owen, Kip Moore, Craig Campbell, Chris Janson, Big & Rich, Lauren Alaina, James Otto, A Thousand Horses, LoCash, The Swon Brothers and more.

Apart from touring the United States, Lucy Angel has also performed internationally, visiting Japan, Switzerland, China and the United Kingdom. In 2006, Lucy Angel performed at the 13th Annual Country Sunshine Festival in Kumamoto, Japan. In 2008, Lucy Angel performed at the Schützenhaus Albisgütli in Zurich, Switzerland.

Lucy Angel journeyed to China twice in 2009. The first time was in January when they gained the distinction of being the first American/Western group ever to be invited to perform at the Great Hall of the People in Tiananmen Square, doing so before an audience of dignitaries and government officials. In May 2009, the group was invited back to China for the Zhangjiajie International Country Music Week in the Hunan Province.

== Discography ==
The group's first single, "How Long", was issued in 2007.

Lucy Angel released two singles in 2011, "Only Woman Left" and "Serious". "Only Woman Left", their breakout single, peaked at No. 45 on MusicRow’s MusicRow CountryBreakout chart. "Serious", their second single reached No. 31 on MusicRow’s CountryBreakout chart and made it to No. 42 on the Billboard Indicator chart. In addition, they have a holiday special single entitled "Mr. Santa."

Lucy Angel's self-titled debut album was released digitally on January 13, 2015. Lucy Angel released "Crazy Too" to Country radio in May 2015. The single reached No. 51 on the Country Airplay chart. "Crazy Too" was a SiriusXM The Highway, Highway Find in November and December 2014.

In 2017 Lucy Angel released a new single to Country Radio entitled "Public Pool Party", the lead single comes from a forthcoming EP project yet to be released.

In 2019, Lucy Angel appeared as guest artists on the Ronnie Milsap album "The Duets". They were featured on the song "Happy Happy Birthday Baby".

== Television ==
=== Reality Show ===
Lucy Angel starred in a 13 episode docu-series, "Discovering Lucy Angel" on AXS TV in the Spring of 2015. The show was set to air internationally in the UK on SHOWBIZ TV beginning February 14, 2016.

HGTV featured the band on the series "Interiors Inc", during which they premiered their song "Cowboy Can."

== Discography ==
=== Albums ===
Title	Details
Lucy Angel	Release date: January 13, 2015; Label: G-Force Records

=== Singles ===
Year	Single	Peak positions	Album
Year	Single	US Country Airplay	Album
2007	"How Long"	—	—N/a
2011	"Only Woman Left"	—	—N/a
2011	"Serious"	—	Lucy Angel
2015	"Crazy Too"	51	Lucy Angel
2017	"Public Pool Party"	—	—N/a

"—" denotes releases that did not chart
