= National Assembly Building (Beijing) =

Building in Beijing, China

- 北京國會舊址
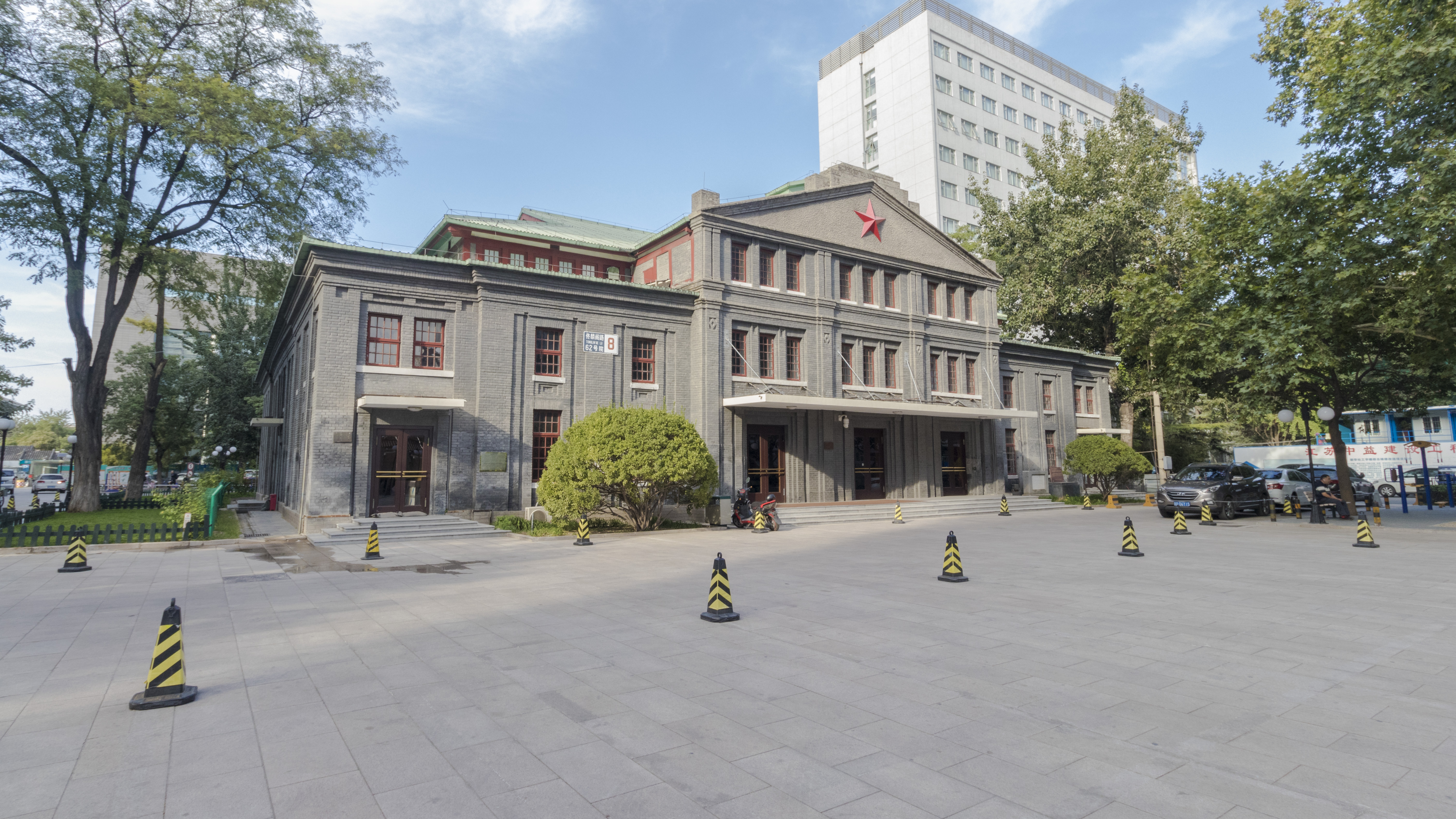
- The building on Xinhua News Agency campus
- Interactive map of the National Assembly Building area

General information
- Location: Beijing, China
- Completed: 1913

Design and construction
- Architect: Curt Rothkegel

The National Assembly Building (北京国会旧址) is the first purpose-built meeting place of the National Assembly (國會, Guóhuì) of the Republic of China in Beijing. It was designed by Curt Rothkegel (1876-1945), a German architect based in Qingdao. Rothkegel had made earlier (and grander) designs for a Parliament Building commissioned by the late Qing Dynasty, whose construction was started in 1910 on the site of today's Beijing International Hotel on East Chang'an Avenue, but was left unfinished at the time of the Xinhai Revolution in 1911. The building was used intermittently for sessions of the National Assembly during its troubled history from the aftermath of China's first national election to the Beijing Coup in October 1924.

The National Assembly Building is now part of the compound of Xinhua News Agency in central Beijing. Xinhua restored it and uses it for events. The Xinhua History Exhibition Hall, an in-house museum, is located in nearby Republican-era brick buildings. The National Assembly building is not open to the public.

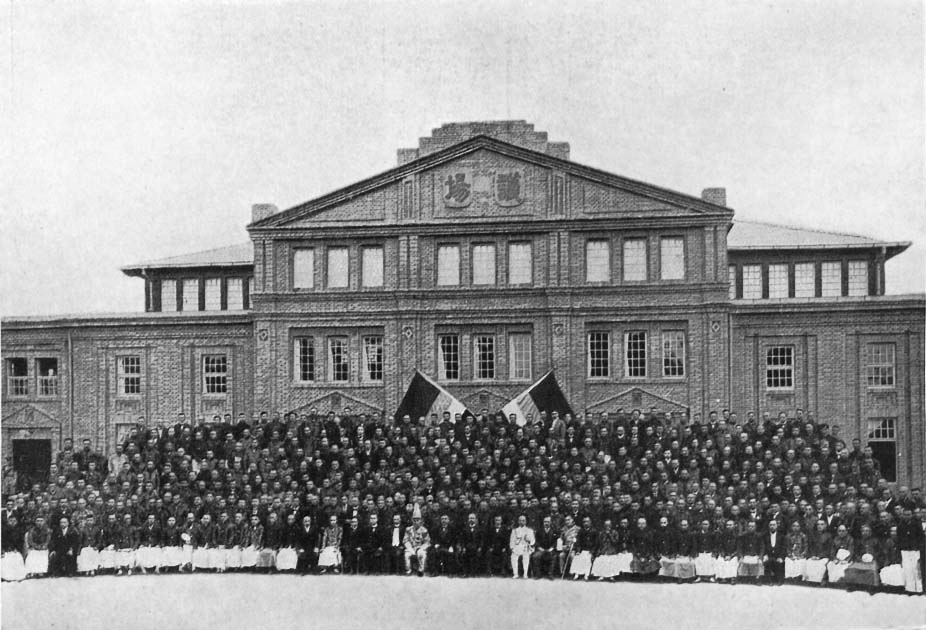
The reopening of the National Assembly on August 1, 1916, following the National Protection War, which ousted Yuan Shikai's dictatorship.

== See also ==
- National Assembly (Republic of China)
- Nanjing Great Hall of the People
- Great Hall of the People
