= Jessie Farrell =

Canadian country music singer

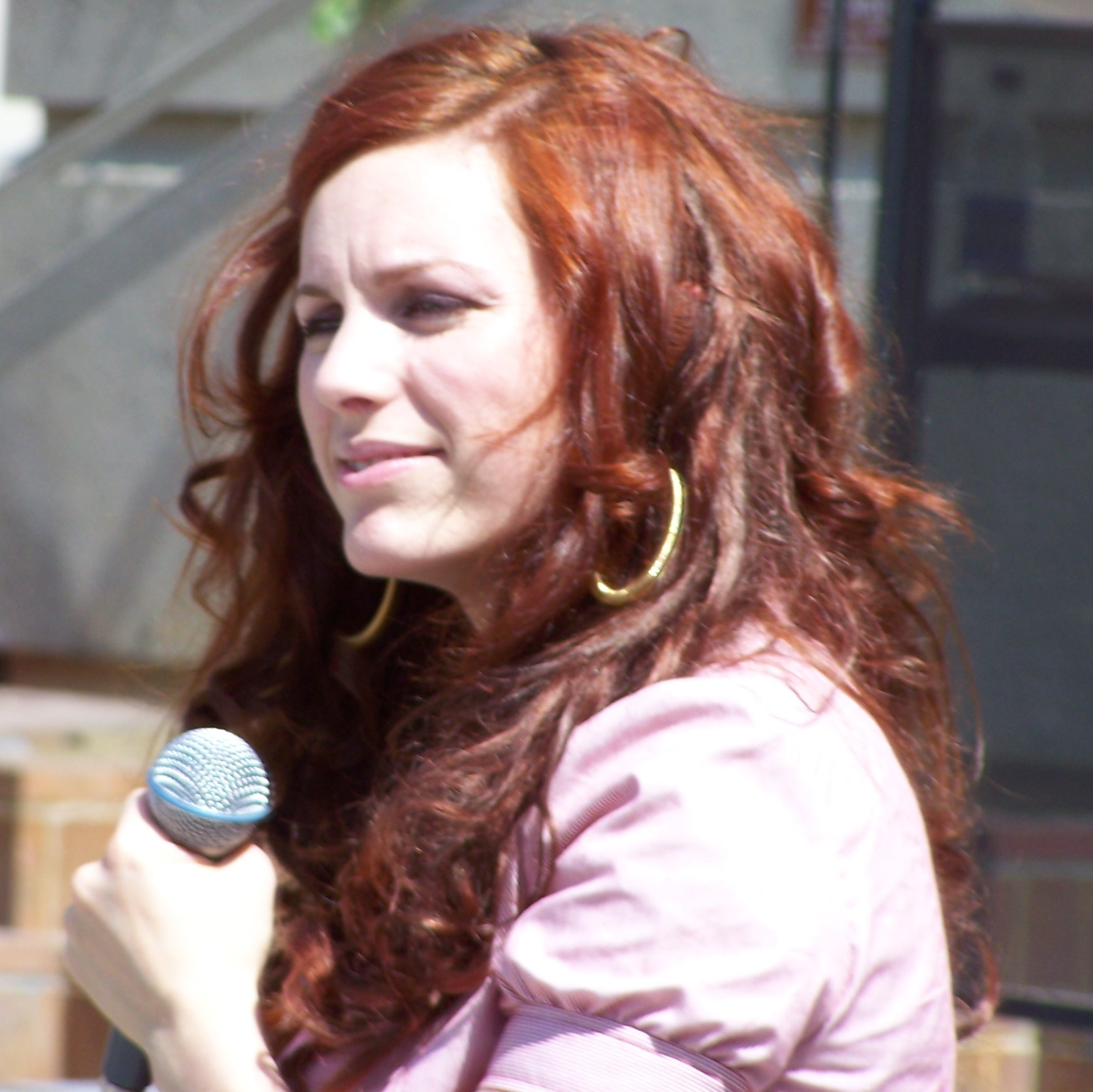
- Jessie Farrell performing at Olympic Plaza in Calgary, Alberta, Canada, July 2007

Background information
- Origin: Vancouver, British Columbia, Canada
- Genres: Country
- Occupation: Singer
- Instrument(s): Vocals, guitar
- Years active: 2002–present
- Labels: Imagine Create Music
- Website: Official website

Jessie Farrell is a Canadian country music singer. At the 2007 Canadian Country Music Awards, Farrell was nominated for Female Vocalist of the Year and the Chevy Rising Star Award. Farrell's first country album, Nothing Fancy, was released on October 9, 2007. At the Canadian Country Music Awards of 2008, Jessie Farrell won Female Artist of the Year and the Top New Female Talent Award. In 2009, she worked with Canadian rock/pop stars Faber Drive on their song "I'll Be There".

Farrell's third studio album, Good, Bad & Pretty Things, was released on October 6, 2009. In 2010, Farrell was one of many Canadian singers who performed "Wavin' Flag" to help Haiti.

Farrell's fourth studio album, Love Letter, was released on August 30, 2011, led by the single "Turn You Down."

In January 2015 Farrell released her first family album, Take Me Outside. The songs are featured on the popular CBC Kid's show, Scout & The Gumboot Kids.

== Discography ==
=== Studio albums ===
Title	Details
Today	Release date: December 6, 2002; Label: Spark Records
Nothing Fancy	Release date: October 9, 2007; Label: 604 Records
Good, Bad & Pretty Things	Release date: October 6, 2009; Label: 604 Records
Love Letter	Release date: August 30, 2011; Label: 604 Records
Take Me Outside	Release date: February 13, 2015; Label: Imagine Create Music

=== Singles ===
Year	Single	Peak positions		Album
Year	Single	CAN Country	CAN	Album
2007	"Let's Talk About Love"	9	96	Nothing Fancy
2007	"Fell Right into You"	15	78	Nothing Fancy
2008	"Best of Me"	19	—	Nothing Fancy
2008	"I Guess"	13	86	Nothing Fancy
2009	"You Make Me Feel"	17	—	Good, Bad & Pretty Things
2009	"Nobody Says No"	27	—	Good, Bad & Pretty Things
2010	"Heart of Gold"	32	—	Good, Bad & Pretty Things
2011	"Turn You Down"	40	—	Love Letter
2011	"Everything to Me"	22	—	Love Letter
2014	"Carry On"	—	—	—
"—" denotes releases that did not chart

=== Featured singles ===
Year	Single	Artist	Peak positions	Album
Year	Single	Artist	CAN	Album
2010	"Wavin' Flag"	Young Artists for Haiti	1	—

=== Music videos ===
Year	Video	Director
2002	"Don't Even Try"	Tara Hungerford
2007	"Let's Talk About Love"	
2007	"Fell Right into You"	
2008	"Best of Me"	
2008	"I Guess"	
2009	"You Make Me Feel"	
2009	"Nobody Says No"	Stephano Barberis
2011	"Turn You Down"	
2011	"Everything to Me"	
2014	"Carry On"	Aaron A
2014	"Real Canadian Girl"	
2015	"Feeling Free"	

== Awards and nominations ==
Year	Association	Category	Result
2007	Canadian Country Music Association	Female Artist of the Year	Nominated
2007	Canadian Country Music Association	Chevy Trucks Rising Star Award	Nominated
2008	Canadian Country Music Association	Fans' Choice Award	Nominated
2008	Canadian Country Music Association	Female Artist of the Year	Won
2008	Canadian Country Music Association	Top New Talent of the Year	Won
2008	Canadian Country Music Association	Top New Talent of the Year – Female	Won
2008	Canadian Country Music Association	Album of the Year – Nothing Fancy	Nominated
2008	Canadian Country Music Association	Single of the Year – "Best of Me"	Nominated
2008	Canadian Country Music Association	Songwriter of the Year – "Best of Me"	Nominated
2008	Canadian Country Music Association	CMT Video of the Year – "Best of Me"	Nominated
2008	Canadian Country Music Association	Top Selling Canadian Album of the Year – Nothing Fancy	Nominated
2009	Juno Awards of 2009	New Artist of the Year	Nominated
2009	Canadian Country Music Association	Fans' Choice Award	Nominated
2009	Canadian Country Music Association	Female Artist of the Year	Nominated
2010	Canadian Country Music Association	Female Artist of the Year	Nominated
2010	Canadian Country Music Association	Songwriter of the Year – "Heart of Gold"	Nominated
