= Victoria Shaw (singer) =

American country singer (born 1962)

Background information
- Born: Victoria Lynn Shaw; July 13, 1962 (age 64); New York City, U.S.
- Genres: Country
- Occupations: Singer, songwriter
- Years active: 1983–present
- Labels: MPB, Reprise, Taffeta
- Website: victoriashaw.com

Victoria Lynn Shaw (born July 13, 1962) is an American country singer. She has recorded four studio albums, and has charted five singles on the Billboard Hot Country Songs charts. In addition, she has co-written four Number One singles for other country music artists, including Garth Brooks' "The River" as featured on the multi-million selling album Ropin' the Wind and John Michael Montgomery's "I Love the Way You Love Me", which won the 1993 Academy of Country Music award for Song of the Year. With Paul Worley, she is also the co-producer of the debut album of Lady A.

== Biography ==
Shaw was born in Manhattan, New York City, on July 13, 1962. Inspired by country rock musicians such as the Eagles and Linda Ronstadt, she began writing songs at an early age. Later, she and her sister, Lori Shaw, found work performing together in the Los Angeles area. Shaw's mother, Carole Bergenthal, recorded for Capitol Records as Carole Bennett. The Shaws moved to California when Shaw was about five years old. Her mother, who was Jewish, would sing Yiddish lullabies to her. By age thirteen, Shaw had founded a band called Solace, which performed at weddings and bar mitzvahs.

Eventually, Shaw moved to Nashville, Tennessee, where she found a publishing contract and a record deal. A minor single, "Break My Heart", was released in 1984 on the MPB label, peaking at No. 61 on the Hot Country Songs charts. Her first major hit as a songwriter came in 1992, when she co-wrote with Garth Brooks "The River" which Brooks took to No. 1 on the Billboard country singles chart. A year later, Doug Stone reached No. 1 on the country charts with Shaw's "Too Busy Being in Love". Later that same year, another Shaw-penned song — John Michael Montgomery's "I Love the Way You Love Me" — also reached No. 1 the country charts and won an Academy of Country Music award for Song of the Year.

In 1994, Shaw signed to Reprise Records, releasing her debut album In Full View that year. Three of this album's singles — "Cry Wolf", "Tears Dry" and "Forgiveness" — all reached the lower regions of the Hot Country Songs charts. That same year, Brooks reached Number One with the song "She's Every Woman" which the two wrote together. In 1995, Shaw received a Top New Female Vocalist nomination from the Academy of Country Music, losing to Chely Wright.

Shaw's second album for Reprise, Victoria Shaw, was released in 1997. However, it produced no chart singles. In 1998, Shaw collaborated with Brooks, Billy Dean, Faith Hill, Olivia Newton-John, Neal McCoy, Michael McDonald and Bryan White for a charity single (written for the Cystic Fibrosis Foundation) entitled "One Heart at a Time", which charted at No. 56 on the Billboard Hot 100. Also that year, Trisha Yearwood recorded the song "Where Your Road Leads", which Shaw co-wrote and originally recorded on In Full View. Yearwood's rendition of the song, which was recorded as a duet with Brooks, served as the title track to her 1998 album Where Your Road Leads, from which it was released as a single.

After exiting Reprise in 1998, Shaw released her third album, Old Friends, New Memories, in 2001 on the Taffeta label. This album included her renditions of the songs that she had written for other artists. In the mid-2000s, Shaw returned to songwriting as well. She has won two Daytime Emmy Awards, in both 1999 and 2000, for co-writing songs for the daytime dramas One Life to Live and As the World Turns. Two of her songs, Emerson Drive's "A Good Man" and Eric Church's "Two Pink Lines", both charted in 2006. She and Paul Worley co-produced Lady A's self-titled debut album, which was released in April 2008. Later that same year, Shaw released her fourth album, Bring On the Love. Shaw also produced Jessie Farrell's second album, Good, Bad & Pretty Things, which was released in Canada in October 2009. In addition, she co-wrote Sarah Buxton's "Outside My Window."

As part of the show Property Brothers: At Home on the Ranch, show hosts Drew and Jonathan Scott—along with Victoria Shaw and Chad Carlson—wrote and recorded two country singles that premiered during the third and fourth episode of the series.

== Discography ==
=== Studio albums ===
Title	Released	Label
In Full View: No. / Title / Writer(s) / Length; 1. / "Lucky Me Lucky You" / Victoria Shaw, Andy Byrd / 3:01; 2. / "Love On Down the Line" / Victoria Shaw; Bob DiPiero / 2:37; 3. / "Forgiveness" / Victoria Shaw; Bob DiPiero / 3:31; 4. / "Good As Gone" / Victoria Shaw; Rob Crosby / 3:17; 5. / "You Don't Know Love" / Victoria Shaw; Andy Byrd / 3:30; 6. / "Bring My Baby Home" / Victoria Shaw; Ken Meeker / 3:01; 7. / "Cry Wolf" / Victoria Shaw; Jess Leary / 2:55; 8. / "(A Day in the Life Of A) Single Mother" / Victoria Shaw; Desmond Child / 3:04; 9. / "Tears Dry" / Victoria Shaw; Jon Vezner / 3:07; 10. / "Where Your Road Leads" / Victoria Shaw; Desmond Child / 3:26; 11. / "Small Talk" / Victoria Shaw / 4:22; Total length: / / / 35:51	August 8, 1995	Reprise Records
Victoria Shaw: No. / Title / Writer(s) / Length; 1. / "Just To Say We Did" / Victoria Shaw; Porter Howell / 2:53; 2. / "Different Drum" / Michael Nesmith / 3:10; 3. / "In Spite Of It All" / Victoria Shaw; Steve McClintock; Tim James / 3:19; 4. / "Let's Talk About Me" / Victoria Shaw; Steve McClintock / 3:12; 5. / "All for the Sake Of Love" / Victoria Shaw; Earl Rose / 3:46; 6. / "Stuck On You" / Sandy Stewart; Shelly Peiken; Adam Gorgoni / 2:59; 7. / "Wild Rose" / Victoria Shaw; Andy Byrd / 2:56; 8. / "Don't Move" / Victoria Shaw; Steve McClintock / 3:53; 9. / "One Of Those Days" / Victoria Shaw; Jess Leary / 3:17; 10. / "I Say The Grace" / Victoria Shaw; Skip Ewing / 3:58; Total length: / / / 33:23	May 20, 1997	Reprise Records
Old Friends, New Memories: No. / Title / Writer(s) / Length; 1. / "That's How Much I Love You" / Victoria Shaw; Sean Altman / 1:54; 2. / "Tripped" / Victoria Shaw; Amy Powers; Peter Zizzo / 3:56; 3. / "The Other Woman" / Victoria Shaw; Skip Ewing / 3:17; 4. / "Too Busy Being in Love" / Victoria Shaw; Gary Burr / 3:53; 5. / "Crying Time" / Victoria Shaw / 3:31; 6. / "The Man Who Lived Here" / Victoria Shaw; Gary Burr / 4:06; 7. / "Every Time We Say Goodbye" / Victoria Shaw; Desmond Child / 3:31; 8. / "Keeps Bringing Me Back" / Victoria Shaw; Steve McClintock; Irianti Erningpraja; A. Ade; A. Hehanussa / 4:04; 9. / "She's Every Woman" / Victoria Shaw; Garth Brooks / 3:07; 10. / "So Many Miracles" / Victoria Shaw; Gary Burr / 4:05; 11. / "Waikiki Cowboy" / Victoria Shaw; Gary Burr / 2:38; 12. / "I Love The Way You Love Me" / Victoria Shaw; Chuck Cannon / 3:57; 13. / "Almost Mine" / Victoria Shaw; Cliff Downs; David Pack / 3:23; 14. / "The River" / Victoria Shaw; Garth Brooks / 4:24; Total length: / / / 49:46	July 21, 1999	Taffeta Records
Bring On the Love: No. / Title / Writer(s) / Length; 1. / "Bring On the Love" / Victoria Shaw; Jennifer Hanson; Mark Hudson / 3:54; 2. / "Eastbound Line" / Victoria Shaw; Gary Burr / 3:39; 3. / "In Valentine" / Victoria Shaw; Jennifer Hanson / 3:27; 4. / "You Will" / Victoria Shaw; Gary Burr; Amy Foster-Gillies / 3:58; 5. / "There's A Song in There Somewhere" / Victoria Shaw; Gary Burr / 3:16; 6. / "Who's To Say" / Victoria Shaw; Gary Burr / 2:46; 7. / "Every Other Day" / Victoria Shaw; Gary Burr; Billy Mann / 3:20; 8. / "You Can't Make Me" / Victoria Shaw; Gary Burr; Kylie Sackley / 3:26; 9. / "Never Alone" / Victoria Shaw; Gary Burr; Sarah Buxton / 3:58; 10. / "God and Me" / Victoria Shaw; Gary Burr / 3:00; Total length: / / / 34:44	September 11, 2007	Taffeta Records
Fa La La: No. / Title / Writer(s) / Length; 1. / "Fa La La" / Victoria Shaw; Jim Brickman / 2:49; 2. / "Coming Home for Christmas" / Victoria Shaw; Jim Brickman; Richie McDonald / 4:17; 3. / "Mrs. Claus" / Victoria Shaw; Jessie Farrell / 2:34; 4. / "Pink Flamingos" / Victoria Shaw; Gary Burr / 3:45; 5. / "Santa's Toyride" (feat. Robin Meade) / Victoria Shaw; Nick Brophy; Jennifer Hanson / 3:38; 6. / "Sending You a Little Christmas" / Victoria Shaw; Jim Brickman; Billy Mann / 3:56; 7. / "Christmas 'Round the World" / Victoria Shaw; Gary Burr / 4:25; 8. / "Virgin's Lullaby" (feat. Ty Herndon, Jimmy Wayne, Chad Carlson & Billy Dean) / Victoria Shaw; Jason Deere / 4:20; 9. / "I Pray" / Jim Brickman; Sharon Thorn; Stuart Thorn / 3:53; 10. / "Fa La La" (Reggae Version) / Victoria Shaw; Jim Brickman / 2:46; 11. / "The Chipmunk Song (Christmas Don't Be Late)" (feat. Ruby Locknar & Ava Locknar) / Ross Bagdasarian / 1:46; Total length: / / / 38:09	November 15, 2011	Taffeta Records

=== Singles ===
Year	Single	Peak chart positions		Album
Year	Single	US Country	CAN Country	Album
1983	"Forever on My Mind"	—	—	—N/a
1984	"Break My Heart"	61	—	—N/a
1984	"I've Changed My Mind"	—	—	—N/a
1994	"Cry Wolf"	57	72	In Full View
1994	"Tears Dry"	74	—	In Full View
1995	"Forgiveness"	58	—	In Full View
1995	"(A Day in the Life of a) Single Mother"	—	82	In Full View
1997	"Don't Move"	—	—	Victoria Shaw
1997	"Different Drum"	—	—	Victoria Shaw
"—" denotes releases that did not chart

=== Guest singles ===
Year	Single	Artist	Peak chart positions		Album
Year	Single	Artist	US Country	US	Album
1998	"One Heart at a Time"	Various artists	69	56	charity single

=== Other charted songs ===
Year	Single	Peak chart positions	Album
Year	Single	US AC	Album
2011	"Santa's Toyride" (with Robin Meade)	21	Fa La La

=== Music videos ===
Year	Video	Director
1994	"Cry Wolf"	Gerry Wenner
1994	"Tears Dry"	Fritz Feick
1995	"Forgiveness"	Gerry Wenner
1997	"Don't Move"	David Abbott
