= List of awards and nominations received by Miranda Lambert =

Miranda Lambert awards and nominations
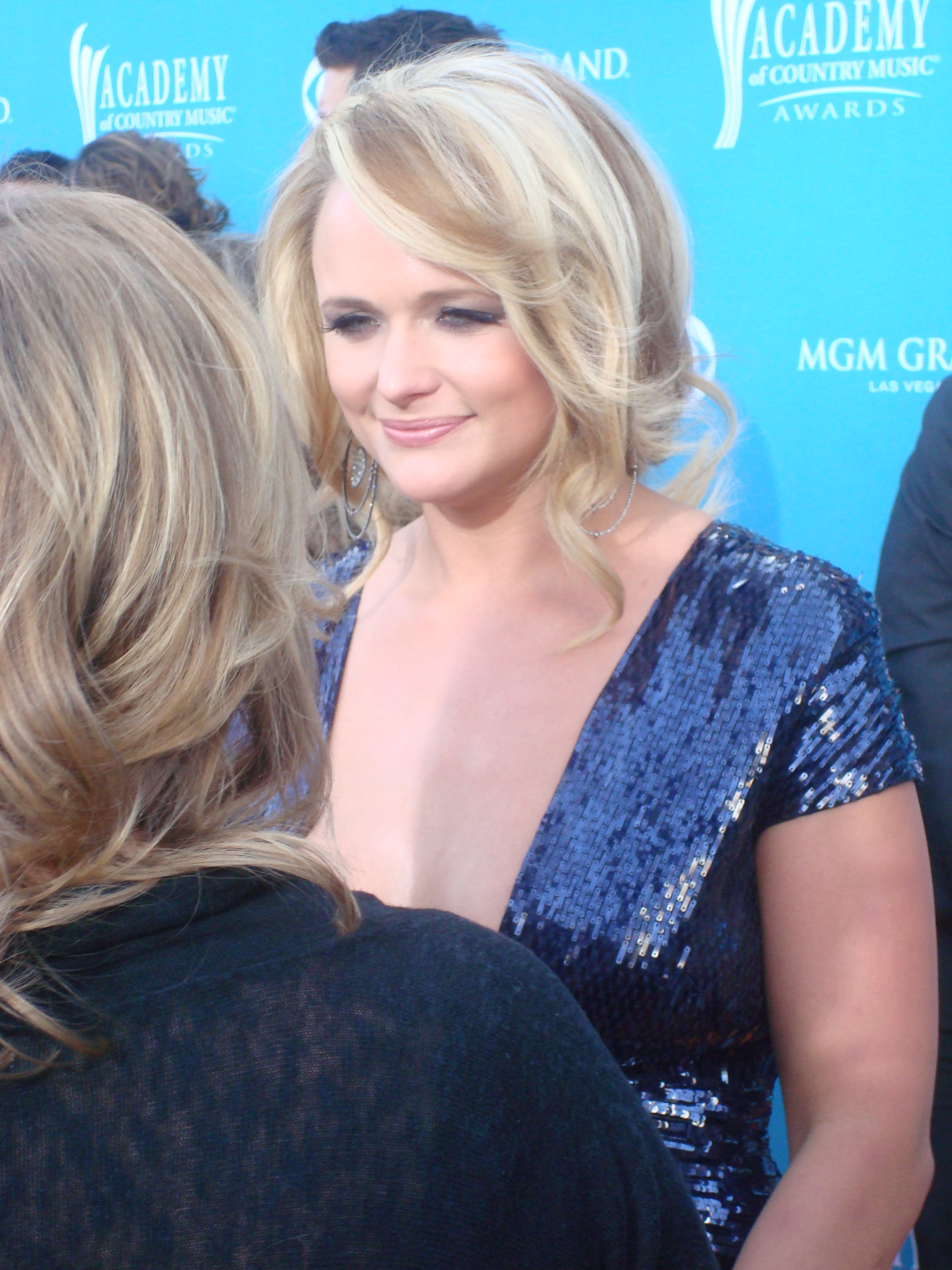
- Lambert in April 2010
Awards and nominations
Award	Wins	Nominations
Academy of Country Music Awards	40	76
American Country Awards	6	19
Billboard Music Awards	0	4
Country Music Association Awards	17	73
CMT Music Awards	7	30
Grammy Awards	3	38
Teen Choice Awards	0	8

Totals (Note: Certain award groups do not simply award one winner. They acknowledge several different recipients, have runners-up, and have third place. Since this is a specific recognition and is different from losing an award, runner-up mentions are considered wins in this award tally. For simplification and to avoid errors, each award in this list has been presumed to have had a prior nomination.)
- Wins: 73
- Nominations: 248

American country singer Miranda Lambert has won 3 Grammy Awards, 40 Academy of Country Music Awards, 6 American Country Awards, 8 CMT Music Awards, 17 Country Music Association Awards, and other awards and nominations. Lambert is the most awarded artist in the history of the ACM Awards and she is one of only 4 women to win the Triple Crown (winning Best New Vocalist, Best Female Vocalist & Entertainer Of The Year). Lambert is also the most awarded female artist in the history of the CMA Awards.

== Academy of Country Music Awards ==
The Academy of Country Music Awards, also known as the ACM Awards, were first held in 1966, honoring the industry's accomplishments during the previous year. It was the first country music awards program held by a major organization. The Academy's signature "hat" trophy was created in 1968. The awards were first televised in 1972 on ABC. In 1979, the Academy joined with Dick Clark Productions to produce the show. Dick Clark and Al Schwartz served as producers and Gene Weed served as director. Under their guidance, the show moved to NBC and finally to CBS, where it remains today. As of 2024, Lambert is the most awarded artist in the history of the ACM awards, receiving several special Milestone Awards over the years, including the honorable Triple Crown Award in 2023 for her achievement of attaining Top New Female Vocalist, Top Female Vocalist, and Entertainer of the Year Awards. Lambert has won 40 ACM awards (including special awards).

Year	Award	Nomination	Result
2006	Top New Female Vocalist	Miranda Lambert	Nominated
2006	Video of the Year	"Kerosene"	Nominated
2007	Top New Female Vocalist	Miranda Lambert	Won
2007	Female Vocalist of the Year	Miranda Lambert	Nominated
2008	Top Female Vocalist	Miranda Lambert	Nominated
2008	Album of the Year	Crazy Ex-Girlfriend	Won
2008	Single Record of the Year	"Famous in a Small Town"	Nominated
2009	Top Female Vocalist	Miranda Lambert	Nominated
2009	Single Record of the Year	"Gunpowder & Lead"	Nominated
2010	Top Female Vocalist of the Year	Miranda Lambert	Won
2010	Album of the Year	Revolution	Won
2010	Single Record of the Year	"White Liar"	Nominated
2010	Song of the Year	"White Liar"	Nominated
2010	Video of the Year	"White Liar"	Won
2011	Entertainer of the Year	Miranda Lambert	Nominated
2011	Top Female Vocalist of the Year	Miranda Lambert	Won
2011	Single Record of the Year	"The House That Built Me"	Won
2011	Song of the Year	"The House That Built Me"	Won
2011	Video of the Year	"The House That Built Me"	Won
2011	Video of the Year	"Only Prettier"	Nominated
2011	Vocal Event of the Year	"Coal Miner's Daughter" with Loretta Lynn and Sheryl Crow	Nominated
2012	Female Vocalist of the Year	Miranda Lambert	Won
2012	Album of the Year	Four the Record	Won
2013	Female Vocalist of the Year	Miranda Lambert	Won
2013	Entertainer of the Year	Miranda Lambert	Nominated
2013	Single of the Year	"Over You"	Won
2013	Song of the Year	"Over You" (won as the artist)	Won
2013	Song of the Year	"Over You" with Blake Shelton (won as a co-writer)	Won
2014	Entertainer of the Year	Miranda Lambert	Nominated
2014	Female Vocalist of the Year	Miranda Lambert	Won
2014	Single of the Year	"Mama's Broken Heart"	Won
2014	Song of the Year	"Mama's Broken Heart"	Nominated
2014	Video of the Year	"Mama's Broken Heart"	Nominated
2014	Vocal Event of the Year	"We Were Us" with Keith Urban	Won
2015	Entertainer of the Year	Miranda Lambert	Nominated
2015	Female Vocalist of the Year	Miranda Lambert	Won
2015	Album of the Year	Platinum	Won
2015	Single of the Year	"Automatic"	Nominated
2015	Song of the Year	"Automatic" (won as the artist)	Won
2015	Song of the Year	"Automatic" with Nicolle Galyon & Natalie Hemby (won as a co-writer)	Won
2015	Video of the Year	"Somethin' Bad" with Carrie Underwood	Nominated
2015	Vocal Event of the Year	"Somethin' Bad" with Carrie Underwood	Nominated
2015	50th Anniversary Milestone Award	Miranda Lambert	Won
2016	Female Vocalist of the Year	Miranda Lambert	Won
2016	Entertainer of the Year	Miranda Lambert	Nominated
2016	Vocal Event of the Year	"Smokin' and Drinkin'" with Little Big Town	Won
2016	Merle Haggard Spirit Award	Miranda Lambert	Won
2017	Female Vocalist of the Year	Miranda Lambert	Won
2017	Album of the Year	The Weight of These Wings	Won
2017	Single Record of the Year	"Vice"	Nominated
2017	Song of the Year	"Vice"	Nominated
2017	Video of the Year	"Vice"	Nominated
2017	Video of the Year	"Forever Country" with Artists of Then, Now & Forever	Won
2017	Vocal Event of the Year	"Forever Country" with Artists of Then, Now & Forever	Nominated
2018	Female Vocalist of the Year	Miranda Lambert	Won
2018	Song of the Year	"Tin Man" with Jack Ingram & Jon Randall (won as a co-writer)	Won
2018	Song of the Year	"Tin Man" (won as the artist)	Won
2018	Video of the Year	"We Should Be Friends"	Nominated
2019	Female Vocalist of the Year	Miranda Lambert	Nominated
2019	Gene Weed Milestone Award	Miranda Lambert	Won
2019	Music Event of the Year	"Drowns the Whiskey" with Jason Aldean	Nominated
2020	Female Vocalist of the Year	Miranda Lambert	Nominated
2020	Album of the Year	Wildcard	Nominated
2020	Music Event of the Year	“Fooled Around and Fell in Love” with Maren Morris, Ashley McBryde, Tenille Townes, Caylee Hammack, and Elle King	Won
2020	Song of the Decade	"The House That Built Me"	Won
2021	Female Vocalist of the Year	Miranda Lambert	Nominated
2021	Single of the Year	"Bluebird"	Nominated
2021	Song of the Year	"Bluebird"	Nominated
2021	Video of the Year	"Bluebird"	Nominated
2022	Entertainer of the Year	Miranda Lambert	Won
2022	Female Vocalist of the Year	Miranda Lambert	Nominated
2022	Album of the Year	The Marfa Tapes	Nominated
2022	Video of the Year	"Drunk (And I Don't Wanna Go Home)" with Elle King	Won
2023	Entertainer of the Year	Miranda Lambert	Nominated
2023	Female Vocalist of the Year	Miranda Lambert	Nominated
2023	Artist-Songwriter of the Year	Miranda Lambert	Nominated
2023	Triple Crown Award	Miranda Lambert	Won
2023	Album of the Year	Palomino	Nominated
2026	Female Artist of the Year	Miranda Lambert	Nominated
2026	Song of the Year	"A Song to Sing" with Chris Stapleton, Jenee Fleenor, and Jesse Frasure	Nominated
2026	Song of the Year	"Choosin' Texas" with Ella Langley, Luke Dick, Joybeth Taylor (won as a co-writer)	Won
2026	Single of the Year	"Choosin' Texas" with Ella Langley, Ben West (won as a co-producer)	Won
2026	Visual Media of the Year	"A Song to Sing" with Chris Stapleton, and directors, Alexa King Stone and Stephen Kinigopoulos	Nominated
2026	Music Event of the Year	"A Song to Sing" with Chris Stapleton	Nominated
2026	Music Event of the Year	"Trailblazer" with Reba McEntire and Lainey Wilson	Nominated

== American Country Awards ==
The American Country Awards is a country music awards show, entirely voted on by fans. Created by the Fox Network, the awards honor country music artists in music, video, and touring categories.

Year	Award	Nomination	Result
2010	Artist of the Year	Miranda Lambert	Nominated
2010	Female Artist of the Year	Miranda Lambert	Nominated
2010	Album of the Year	Revolution	Nominated
2010	Single by a Female Artist	"White Liar"	Nominated
2010	Music Video by a Female Artist	"White Liar"	Nominated
2011	Female Artist of the Year	Miranda Lambert	Nominated
2011	Female Single of the Year	"Heart Like Mine"	Nominated
2012	Female Artist of the Year	Miranda Lambert	Nominated
2012	Touring Artist of the Year	Miranda Lambert	Nominated
2012	Single by a Female Artist	"Over You"	Won
2012	Music Video by a Female Artist	"Over You"	Won
2013	Female Artist of the Year	Miranda Lambert	Won
2013	Touring Artist of the Year	Miranda Lambert	Nominated
2013	Most Played Female Radio Track	Miranda Lambert	Won
2013	Single by a Female Artist	"Mama's Broken Heart"	Won
2013	Music Video by a Female Artist	"Mama's Broken Heart"	Nominated
2014	Female Vocalist of the Year	Miranda Lambert	Won
2014	Collaboration of the Year	"We Were Us" (with Keith Urban)	Nominated
2014	Album of the Year	Platinum	Nominated

== American Music Awards ==
The American Music Awards (AMAs) is an annual American music awards show, created by Dick Clark in 1973 for ABC when the network's contract to present the Grammy Awards expired, Miranda Lambert received eight nominations.

Year	Award	Nomination	Result
2010	Favorite Female Artist – Country	Miranda Lambert	Nominated
2011	Favorite Female Artist – Country	Miranda Lambert	Nominated
2012	Favorite Female Artist – Country	Miranda Lambert	Nominated
2013	Favorite Female Artist – Country	Miranda Lambert	Nominated
2014	Favorite Female Artist – Country	Miranda Lambert	Nominated
2015	Favorite Female Artist – Country	Miranda Lambert	Nominated
2017	Favorite Female Artist – Country	Miranda Lambert	Nominated
2020	Favorite Female Artist – Country	Miranda Lambert	Nominated

== Billboard Music Awards ==
The Billboard Music Award is an honor given by Billboard, a publication and music popularity chart covering the music business. The Billboard Music Awards show had been held annually since 1989 in December until it went dormant in 2007. The awards returned in 2011 and is held annually in May.

Year	Award	Nomination	Result
2011	Top Country Song	"The House That Built Me"	Nominated
2015	Top Country Album	Platinum	Nominated
2018	Top Country Female Artist	Miranda Lambert	Nominated
2022	Top Country Female Artist	Miranda Lambert	Nominated

== CMT Music Awards ==
The CMT Music Awards is a fan-voted awards show for country music videos and television performances. The awards ceremony is held every year in Nashville, Tennessee, and broadcast live on CMT. Voting takes place on CMT's website, CMT.com.

Year	Award	Nomination	Result
2006	Female Video of the Year	"Kerosene"	Nominated
2006	Breakthrough Video of the Year	"Kerosene"	Nominated
2008	Female Video of the Year	"Famous in a Small Town"	Nominated
2009	Female Video of the Year	"More Like Her"	Nominated
2010	Video of the Year	"White Liar"	Nominated
2010	Female Video of the Year	"White Liar"	Won
2011	Female Video of the Year	"The House That Built Me"	Won
2011	Video of the Year	"The House That Built Me"	Nominated
2011	Collaborative Video of the Year	"Coal Miner's Daughter" with Loretta Lynn and Sheryl Crow	Nominated
2012	Video of the Year	"Over You"	Nominated
2012	Female Video of the Year	"Over You"	Won
2013	Female Video of the Year	"Mama's Broken Heart"	Won
2013	Video of the Year	"Mama's Broken Heart"	Nominated
2013	CMT Performance of the Year	"Over You"	Won
2014	Female Video of the Year	"Automatic"	Won
2014	Video of the Year	"Automatic"	Nominated
2014	Video of the Year	"Boys 'Round Here" with Blake Shelton and Pistol Annies	Nominated
2014	Collaborative Video of the Year	"Boys 'Round Here" with Blake Shelton and Pistol Annies	Nominated
2014	Video of the Year	"We Were Us" (with Keith Urban)	Nominated
2014	Collaborative Video of the Year	"We Were Us" (with Keith Urban)	Nominated
2015	Video of the Year	"Somethin' Bad with Carrie Underwood	Nominated
2015	Collaborative Video of the Year	"Somethin' Bad with Carrie Underwood	Won
2015	Female Video of the Year	"Little Red Wagon"	Nominated
2017	Video of the Year	"Vice"	Nominated
2017	Female Video of the Year	"Vice"	Nominated
2018	Female Video of the Year	"Tin Man"	Nominated
2019	Female Video of the Year	"Keeper of the Flame"	Nominated
2019	Collaborative Video of the Year	"Drowns the Whiskey" with Jason Aldean	Nominated
2020	Video of the Year	"Bluebird"	Nominated
2020	Female Video of the Year	"Bluebird"	Nominated
2021	Female Video of the Year	"Settling Down"	Nominated
2021	Best Family Feature	"Settling Down"	Nominated
2021	Collaborative Video of the Year	"Drunk (And I Don't Wanna Go Home)" with Elle King	Nominated
2022	Video of the Year	"If I Was a Cowboy"	Nominated
2022	Female Video of the Year	"If I Was a Cowboy"	Won
2023	Female Video of the Year	"Actin' Up"	Nominated

== Country Music Association Awards ==
The Country Music Association Awards, also known as the CMA Awards or CMAs, are presented to country music artists and broadcasters to recognize outstanding achievement in the county music industry. Lambert has won 17 times from 73 nominations.

Year	Award	Nomination	Result
2005	Horizon Award	Miranda Lambert	Nominated
2006	Horizon Award	Miranda Lambert	Nominated
2006	Music Video of the Year	"Kerosene"	Nominated
2007	Female Vocalist of the Year	Miranda Lambert	Nominated
2008	Female Vocalist of the Year	Miranda Lambert	Nominated
2008	Single of the Year	"Gunpowder & Lead"	Nominated
2009	Female Vocalist of the Year	Miranda Lambert	Nominated
2010	Entertainer of the Year	Miranda Lambert	Nominated
2010	Female Vocalist of the Year	Miranda Lambert	Won
2010	Album of the Year	Revolution	Won
2010	Single of the Year	"White Liar"	Nominated
2010	Song of the Year	"White Liar"	Nominated
2010	Music Video of the Year	"White Liar"	Nominated
2010	Music Video of the Year	"The House That Built Me"	Won
2010	Single of the Year	"The House That Built Me"	Nominated
2010	Musical Event of the Year	"Bad Angel" with Dierks Bentley and Jamey Johnson	Nominated
2011	Female Vocalist of the Year	Miranda Lambert	Won
2011	Musical Event of the Year	"Coal Miner's Daughter" with Loretta Lynn and Sheryl Crow	Nominated
2012	Album of the Year	Four the Record	Nominated
2012	Female Vocalist of the Year	Miranda Lambert	Won
2012	Song of the Year	"Over You"	Won
2012	Music Video of the Year	"Over You"	Nominated
2013	Female Vocalist of the Year	Miranda Lambert	Won
2013	Single of the Year	"Mama's Broken Heart"	Nominated
2013	Music Video of the Year	"Mama's Broken Heart"	Nominated
2013	Music Video of the Year	"Boys 'Round Here" with Blake Shelton and Pistol Annies	Nominated
2013	Musical Event of the Year	"Boys 'Round Here" with Blake Shelton and Pistol Annies	Nominated
2014	Entertainer of the Year	Miranda Lambert	Nominated
2014	Female Vocalist of the Year	Miranda Lambert	Won
2014	Album of the Year	Platinum	Won
2014	Single of the Year	"Automatic"	Won
2014	Song of the Year	"Automatic"	Nominated
2014	Music Video of the Year	"Automatic"	Nominated
2014	Music Video of the Year	"Somethin' Bad" with Carrie Underwood	Nominated
2014	Musical Event of the Year	"Somethin' Bad" with Carrie Underwood	Nominated
2014	Musical Event of the Year	"We Were Us" with Keith Urban	Won
2015	Entertainer of the Year	Miranda Lambert	Nominated
2015	Female Vocalist of the Year	Miranda Lambert	Won
2015	Music Video of the Year	"Little Red Wagon"	Nominated
2015	Musical Event of the Year	"Smokin' and Drinkin'" with Little Big Town	Nominated
2016	Female Vocalist of the Year	Miranda Lambert	Nominated
2017	Female Vocalist of the Year	Miranda Lambert	Won
2017	Album of the Year	The Weight of These Wings	Nominated
2017	Single of the Year	"Tin Man"	Nominated
2017	Song of the Year	"Tin Man"	Nominated
2017	Music Video of the Year	"Vice"	Nominated
2018	Female Vocalist of the Year	Miranda Lambert	Nominated
2018	Single of the Year	"Drowns the Whiskey" with Jason Aldean	Nominated
2018	Musical Event of the Year	"Drowns the Whiskey" with Jason Aldean	Nominated
2019	Female Vocalist of the Year	Miranda Lambert	Nominated
2020	Entertainer of the Year	Miranda Lambert	Nominated
2020	Female Vocalist of the Year	Miranda Lambert	Nominated
2020	Album of the Year	Wildcard	Nominated
2020	Single of the Year	"Bluebird"	Nominated
2020	Song of the Year	"Bluebird"	Nominated
2020	Music Video of the Year	"Bluebird"	Won
2020	Musical Event of the Year	"Fooled Around and Fell in Love" with Maren Morris, Ashley McBryde, Tenille Townes, Caylee Hammack, and Elle King	Nominated
2021	Entertainer of the Year	Miranda Lambert	Nominated
2021	Female Vocalist of the Year	Miranda Lambert	Nominated
2021	Musical Event of the Year	"Drunk (And I Don't Wanna Go Home)" with Elle King	Nominated
2022	Entertainer of the Year	Miranda Lambert	Nominated
2022	Female Vocalist of the Year	Miranda Lambert	Nominated
2022	Album of the Year	Palomino	Nominated
2023	Female Vocalist of the Year	Miranda Lambert	Nominated
2025	Female Vocalist of the Year	Miranda Lambert	Nominated
2026	Female Vocalist of the Year	Miranda Lambert	Nominated
2026	Album of the Year	Dandelion (as producer)	Won
2026	Single of the Year	"Choosin' Texas" (as producer)	Won
2026	Song of the Year	"Choosin' Texas" (as songwriter)	Won
2026	Single of the Year	"Be Her" (as producer)	Nominated
2026	Musical Event of the Year	"A Song to Sing" with Chris Stapleton	Nominated
2026	Musical Event of the Year	"Horses and Divorces" with Kacey Musgraves	Nominated

== Grammy Awards ==
A Grammy Award (originally called Gramophone Award), or Grammy, is an accolade by the National Academy of Recording Arts and Sciences (NARAS) of the United States to recognize outstanding achievement in the music industry. The annual presentation ceremony features performances by prominent artists, and the presentation of those awards that have a more popular interest. Lambert has won 3 Grammys from 38 nominations.

Year	Award	Nominated work	Result
2007	Best Female Country Vocal Performance	"Kerosene"	Nominated
2008	Best Female Country Vocal Performance	"Famous in a Small Town"	Nominated
2010	Best Female Country Vocal Performance	"Dead Flowers"	Nominated
2011	Best Female Country Vocal Performance	"The House That Built Me"	Won
2011	Best Country Collaboration with Vocals	"Bad Angel" with Dierks Bentley and Jamey Johnson	Nominated
2011	Best Country Album	Revolution	Nominated
2013	Best Country Album	Four the Record	Nominated
2014	Best Country Solo Performance	"Mama's Broken Heart"	Nominated
2015	Best Country Solo Performance	"Automatic"	Nominated
2015	Best Country Song	"Automatic"	Nominated
2015	Best Country Album	Platinum	Won
2015	Best Country Duo/Group Performance	"Somethin' Bad" with Carrie Underwood	Nominated
2017	Best Country Song	"Vice"	Nominated
2017	Best Country Solo Performance	"Vice"	Nominated
2018	Best Country Solo Performance	"Tin Man "	Nominated
2018	Best Country Song	"Tin Man "	Nominated
2020	Best Country Song	"It All Comes Out in the Wash"	Nominated
2020	Best Country Album	Interstate Gospel with Pistol Annies	Nominated
2021	Best Country Album	Wildcard	Won
2021	Best Country Solo Performance	"Bluebird"	Nominated
2021	Best Country Song	"Bluebird"	Nominated
2022	Best Country Duo/Group Performance	"Drunk (And I Don't Wanna Go Home)" with Elle King	Nominated
2022	Best Country Album	The Marfa Tapes with Jon Randall and Jack Ingram	Nominated
2023	Best Country Album	Palomino	Nominated
2023	Best Country Solo Performance	"In His Arms"	Nominated
2023	Best Country Song	"If I Was a Cowboy"	Nominated
2023	Best Country Duo/Group Performance	"Outrunnin' Your Memory" with Luke Combs	Nominated
2026	Best Country Duo/Group Performance	"Trailblazer" with Reba McEntire and Lainey Wilson	Nominated
2026	Best Country Duo/Group Performance	"A Song to Sing" with Chris Stapleton	Nominated
2026	Best Country Song	"A Song to Sing" with Chris Stapleton	Nominated
2026	Best Contemporary Country Album	Postcards from Texas	Nominated
2027	Album of the Year	Dandelion	Pending
2027	Record of the Year	"Choosin' Texas"	Pending
2027	Song of the Year	"Choosin' Texas"	Pending
2027	Best Country Song	"Choosin' Texas"	Pending
2027	Best Country Song	"Hardwired"	Pending
2027	Best Country Duo/Group Performance	"Horses and Divorces" with Kacey Musgraves	Pending
2027	Producer of the Year, Non-Classical	Miranda Lambert	Pending

== MusicRow Awards ==
MusicRow hosts its MusicRow Chart Airplay Awards during the Annual Country Radio Seminar in Nashville recognizing the highest number of spins artists or labels receive from chart reporting stations throughout the year.

Year	Award	Nomination	Result
2005	New Artist Of The Year	Miranda Lambert	Won
2010	Song of the Year	"The House That Built Me"	Won

== O Music Awards ==
The O Music Awards (commonly abbreviated as the OMAs) is an awards show presented by Viacom to honor music, technology and intersection between the two.

Year	Award	Nomination	Result
2013	Best Interactive Video	"Fastest Girl in Town"	Nominated

== People's Choice Awards ==
The People's Choice Awards is an American awards show, recognizing the people and the work of popular culture, voted on by the general public since 1975.

Year	Award	Nomination	Result
2015	Favorite Female Country Artist	Miranda Lambert	Nominated
2016	Favorite Female Country Artist	Miranda Lambert	Nominated
2017	Favorite Female Country Artist	Miranda Lambert	Nominated
2020	Favorite Country Artist	Miranda Lambert	Nominated
2021	The Country Artist of the Year	Miranda Lambert	Nominated
2022	The Country Artist of the Year	Miranda Lambert	Nominated

== People's Choice Country Awards ==
The People's Choice Country Awards is an American awards show, recognizing the best in the country misic through the year, chosen entirely by the fans across various categories.

Year	Award	Nomination	Result
2023	The Female Artist of 2023	Miranda Lambert	Nominated
2024	Icon Award	Miranda Lambert	Won
2024	The Female Artist of 2024	Miranda Lambert	Nominated
2024	The Female Song of 2024	"Wranglers"	Nominated

== Teen Choice Award ==
The Teen Choice Awards is an annual awards show that airs on the Fox television network. The awards honor the year's biggest achievements in music, movies, sports, television, fashion, and more, voted by teen viewers (ages 13 to 19). Winners receive a full size surfboard designed with the graphics of that year's show.

Year	Award	Nomination	Result
2010	Choice Music: Country Song	"The House That Built Me"	Nominated
2010	Choice Female Country Artist	Miranda Lambert	Nominated
2011	Choice Female Country Artist	Miranda Lambert	Nominated
2012	Choice Female Country Artist	Miranda Lambert	Nominated
2013	Choice Female Country Artist	Miranda Lambert	Nominated
2014	Choice Female Country Artist	Miranda Lambert	Nominated
2014	Choice Music: Country Song	"Somethin' Bad" (with Carrie Underwood)	Nominated
2015	Choice Country Artist	Miranda Lambert	Nominated

== World Music Awards ==
The World Music Awards is an international awards show founded in 1989 under the high patronage of Albert II, Prince of Monaco and is based in Monte Carlo.

Year	Award	Nomination	Result
2014	World's Best Album	Four the Record	Nominated

== Other awards and nominations ==
Year	Award	Nomination	Result
2010	16th Inspirational Country Music Awards	Mainstream Inspirational Country Song – "The House That Built Me"	Nominated
2010	16th Inspirational Country Music Awards	Inspirational Country Music Video – "The House That Built Me"	Nominated
2010	8th French Country Music Awards	Best Female Vocalist of the Year (Meilleure Chanteuse)	Nominated
2012	CMT Teddy Awards	Best Breakup Video – "Kerosene"	Won
2014	CMT Artists of the Year Awards	Honoree	Won
2014	Vevo Hot This Year	Best Country Video - "Somethin' Bad" (with Carrie Underwood)	Won
2018	CMT Artists of the Year Awards	Honoree	Won
2021	National Cowgirl Museum and Hall of Fame	Cowgirl Honoree	N/A
