= Keeper of the Flame Tour =

2016 concert tour by Miranda Lambert

- Tour by Miranda Lambert
- Start date: April 30, 2016
- End date: September 10, 2016
- Legs: 1
- No. of shows: 26

Miranda Lambert concert chronology
- Platinum Tour (2014–16); Keeper of the Flame Tour (2016); Highway Vagabond Tour (2017)

The Keeper of the Flame Tour was the sixth headlining concert tour by American country music artist Miranda Lambert. It began on April 30, 2016, in Austin, Texas, and finished on September 10, 2016, in West Palm Beach, Florida. In between dates on this tour, Lambert opened up for Kenny Chesney on his Spread the Love Tour. The tour was first announced on Lambert's website in January 2016. The last three shows were cancelled due to Lambert being put on mandated vocal rest.

== Concert synopsis ==
For this tour Lambert will switch up the setlist by performing old songs, new covers.

== Opening acts ==
- Kip Moore
- Brothers Osborne

== Setlist ==
Setlist I

Setlist performed in Maryland Heights

1. "Fastest Girl in Town"
2. "Baggage Claim"
3. "Kerosene"
4. "Heart Like Mine"
5. "Bathroom Sink"
6. "Slow Ride" (Foghat cover)
7. "Willin'" (Linda Ronstadt cover)
8. "Over You"
9. "Famous in a Small Town"
10. "All Kinds of Kinds"
11. "The House That Built Me"
12. "Mama's Broken Heart"
13. "Dead Flowers"
14. "Covered Wagon"
15. "Automatic"
16. "White Liar"
17. "Your/"Little Red Wagon"
18. "Gunpowder & Lead"

Encore

19. "Dear Diamond"
Setlist II

Setlist performed in Bethel, Virginia Beach, Bristow

1. "Fastest Girl in Town"
2. "Baggage Claim"
3. "Kerosene"
4. "Heart Like Mine"
5. "Bathroom Sink"
6. "Mississippi Queen" Mountain cover)
7. "Sweet Be Sweet"
8. "Over You"
9. "Famous in a Small Town"
10. "All Kinds of Kinds"
11. "The House That Built Me"
12. "Mama's Broken Heart"
13. "Dead Flowers"
14. "Covered Wagon"
15. "Automatic"
16. "White Liar"
17. "Little Red Wagon"
18. "Gunpowder & Lead"

Encore

19. "Willin'" (Linda Rondstat cover)
20. "Me and Bobby McGee" (Kris Kristofferson cover)
;Notes
"Dead Flowers" was performed in Bethel.

== Tour dates ==
Dates	City	Country	Venue	Opening acts
North America
April 30, 2016 (Note: The show was a part of the iHeartRadio Country Festival.)	Austin	United States	Frank Erwin Center	—
May 6, 2016	Laughlin	United States	Laughlin Event Center	—
May 13, 2016	Maryland Heights	United States	Hollywood Casino Amphitheatre	Kip Moore; Brothers Osborne
May 14, 2016	Noblesville	United States	Klipsch Music Center	Kip Moore; Brothers Osborne
May 19, 2016	Bethel	United States	Bethel Woods Center for the Arts	Kip Moore; Brothers Osborne
May 20, 2016	Virginia Beach	United States	Veterans United Home Loans Amphitheater	Kip Moore; Brothers Osborne
May 21, 2016	Bristow	United States	Jiffy Lube Live	Kip Moore; Brothers Osborne
May 27, 2016 (Note: The show was a part of the Tree Town Music Festival.)	Forest City	United States	Tree Town Music Festival	—
June 9, 2016 (Note: The show was a part of the CMA Music Festival.)	Nashville	United States	Nissan Stadium	—
June 10, 2016	Raleigh	United States	Coastal Credit Union Music Park	Kip Moore; Brothers Osborne
June 11, 2016	Charlotte	United States	PNC Music Pavilion	Kip Moore; Brothers Osborne
June 12, 2016	Jacksonville	United States	Jacksonville Veterans Memorial Arena	Kip Moore; Brothers Osborne
June 23, 2016	Darien	United States	Darien Lake PAC	Kip Moore; Brothers Osborne
June 24, 2016	Saratoga Springs	United States	Saratoga Performing Arts Center	Kip Moore; Brothers Osborne
July 15, 2016	Rogers	United States	Walmart Arkansas Music Pavilion	Kip Moore; Brothers Osborne
July 28, 2016	Cuyahoga Falls	United States	Blossom Music Center	Kip Moore; Brothers Osborne
July 29, 2016	Tinley Park	United States	Hollywood Casino Amphitheatre	Kip Moore; Brothers Osborne
July 30, 2016	Omaha	United States	CenturyLink Center Omaha	Kip Moore; Brothers Osborne
August 5, 2016	Irvine	United States	Irvine Meadows Amphitheatre	Kip Moore; Brothers Osborne
August 11, 2016 (Note: The show is a part of the Sturgis Festival.)	Sturgis	United States	Buffalo Chip Campground	—
August 14, 2016 (Note: The show is a part of The Willamette Country Music Festival.)	Brownsville	United States	The Willamette Country Music Festival	—
August 19, 2016	Hartford	United States	Xfinity Theatre	Kip Moore; Brothers Osborne
August 21, 2016	Bangor	United States	Darling's Waterfront Pavilion	Kip Moore; Brothers Osborne
August 25, 2016	Columbia	United States	Merriweather Post Pavilion	Kip Moore; Brothers Osborne
September 9, 2016	Tampa	United States	MidFlorida Credit Union Amphitheatre	Kip Moore; Brothers Osborne
September 10, 2016	West Palm Beach	United States	Perfect Vodka Amphitheatre	Kip Moore; Brothers Osborne

list of festivals

=== Cancellations and rescheduled shows ===
September 15, 2016	Corpus Christi	American Bank Center	Mandated vocal rest
September 16, 2016	Austin	Frank Erwin Center	Mandated vocal rest
September 17, 2016	San Antonio	AT&T Center	Mandated vocal rest
