= Platinum Tour =

2014–16 concert tour by Miranda Lambert

- Tour by Miranda Lambert
- Promotional poster for the tour
- Location: North America
- Associated album: Platinum
- Start date: July 10, 2014
- End date: March 13, 2016
- Legs: 6
- No. of shows: 86 in North America; 3 in Europe; 89 Total

Miranda Lambert concert chronology
- Locked and Reloaded Tour (2013); Platinum Tour (2014–16); Keeper of the Flame Tour (2016)

The Platinum Tour presented by Crystal Light is the fifth headlining concert tour by American country music singer Miranda Lambert. The tour was in support of her fifth studio album, Platinum (2014). The first leg of the tour began on July 10, 2014, in Fort Loramie, Ohio and ended on September 20, 2014, in Honolulu with there being thirty dates for that leg. Lambert kicked off the second leg called, the "Certified Platinum Tour" on January 15, 2015, in Evansville, Indiana. This leg will end on July 9, 2015, in Calgary, Alberta. The third leg called the "Roadside Bars & Pink Guitars Tour" began on September 25, 2015, in Billings, Montana and ended on October 19, 2015. The tour ended on March 13, 2016. The 2015 legs of tour grossed $20 million.

== Background ==
The tour was first announced in May 2014, and began on July 10, with the first leg ending on September 20. Lambert says, "Platinum represents a lifestyle for me. It's the color of my hair, wedding ring, my airstream trailer, so it's just a natural fit for the name of my new album and its why we decided to name the tour Platinum too." A second leg was later added beginning on January 2, 2015 and will end on March 26. The shows in March 2016 are a part of the C2C: Country to Country festival and will be Lambert's first European shows.

== Concert synopsis ==
At the beginning of the show, there is "a montage paying homage to female pioneers", such as Sally Ride. Then on a black screen "a slogan in white text" and in capital letters appears saying, "Well-behaved women rarely make history." Before the show began, "there was a screening of the music video for "Somethin' Bad", her hit song with Carrie Underwood. Lambert starts the show with "Fastest Girl in Town" and closes with "Gunpowder & Lead". During "Famous in a Small Town" the video screen shows "clips of Lambert as a child and as a young country star starting her career."

On March 6, 2015, in Oklahoma City and on March, 7, in Wichita, Kansas, Lambert surprised the audience by bringing her husband, Blake Shelton up on stage to sing "God Gave Me You".

=== Fan interaction ===
Inspired by Lambert's song and video, "All Kinds of Kinds", Lambert wants to know what "kinds of kinds" the fans are. Concert goers can uploaded photos of themselves online for a chance for their photo to be shown on the big screen during the show.

== Opening acts ==
- Neal McCoy
- RaeLynn
- Danielle Bradbery
- Florida Georgia Line
- Tyler Farr
- Justin Moore
- Thomas Rhett

== Setlist ==
1. "Fastest Girl in Town"
2. "Kerosene"
3. "Platinum"
4. "Little Red Wagon"
5. "Baggage Claim"
6. "Hard Staying Sober"
7. "Over You"
8. "All Kinds of Kinds"
9. "Me and Charlie Talking"
10. "Babies Makin' Babies"
11. "Famous in a Small Town"
12. "Mississippi Queen" (Mountain cover)
13. "Mama's Broken Heart"
14. "Bring Me Down"
15. "Smokin' and Drinkin'"
16. "The House That Built Me"
17. "Automatic"
18. "New Strings"
19. "White Liar"
20. "Gunpowder and Lead"

Encore

21. "Gravity Is a Bitch"
22. "Somethin' Bad"

== Tour dates ==
Date	City	Country	Venue	Opening act(s)	Attendance	Gross revenue
Platinum Tour – North America Leg 1
July 10, 2014^{[A]}	Fort Loramie	United States	Country Concert at Hickory Hills Lake	Neal McCoy; RaeLynn	5,600 / 5,600	—
July 11, 2014	Tuscaloosa	United States	Tuscaloosa Amphitheater	Neal McCoy; RaeLynn	6,290 / 6,290	$368,167
July 12, 2014	Rogers	United States	Walmart Arkansas Music Pavilion	Neal McCoy; RaeLynn	9,570 / 9,570	$504,815
July 17, 2014 ^{[B]}	Monticello	United States	Great Jones County Fair	Neal McCoy; RaeLynn	12,346 / 17,900	—
July 20, 2014 ^{[C]}	Brooklyn	United States	Faster Horses Fest	—	12,113 / 13,000	—
July 25, 2014	Twin Lakes	United States	Country Thunder	—	15,436 / 32,000	—
August 1, 2014 ^{[D]}	Sweet Home	United States	Oregon Jamboree	—	9,115 / 13,000	—
August 3, 2014	Camrose	Canada	Camrose Resiane Exhibition	—	5,090 / 5,090	—
August 8, 2014	Wheatland	United States	Sleep Train Amphitheatre	Justin Moore; Thomas Rhett	16,453 / 18,584	$553,606
August 9, 2014	Mountain View	United States	Shoreline Amphitheatre	Justin Moore; Thomas Rhett	17,650 / 22,000	$557,172
August 10, 2014	Irvine	United States	Verizon Wireless Amphitheatre	Justin Moore; Thomas Rhett	14,984 / 14,984	$579,802
August 15, 2014	Tinley Park	United States	First Midwest Bank Amphitheatre	Justin Moore; Thomas Rhett	21,959 / 28,596	$686,417
August 16, 2014	Noblesville	United States	Klipsch Music Center	Justin Moore; Thomas Rhett	23,622 / 24,425	$642,897
August 17, 2014	Bonner Springs	United States	Cricket Wireless Amphitheater	Justin Moore; Thomas Rhett	11,531 / 18,000	$425,833
August 21, 2014	Raleigh	United States	Walnut Creek Amphitheatre	Justin Moore; Thomas Rhett	18,956 / 19,980	$496,851
August 22, 2014	Virginia Beach	United States	Farm Bureau Live	Justin Moore; Thomas Rhett	15,943 / 19,595	$472,665
August 23, 2014	Bristow	United States	Jiffy Lube Live	Justin Moore; Thomas Rhett	19,184 / 22,937	$616,095
August 29, 2014	Darien Center	United States	Darien Lake PAC	Justin Moore; Thomas Rhett	12,918 / 21,800	$477,333
August 30, 2014	Hartford	United States	Xfinity Theatre	Justin Moore; Thomas Rhett	13,346 / 24,087	$434,340
August 31, 2014	Bethel	United States	Bethel Woods Center for the Arts	Justin Moore; Thomas Rhett	15,919 / 15,919	$595,521
September 4, 2014	Toronto	Canada	Molson Canadian Amphitheatre	Justin Moore; Thomas Rhett	14,892 / 15,815	$583,842
September 5, 2014	Camden	United States	Susquehanna Bank Center	Justin Moore; Thomas Rhett	15,173 / 24,567	$481,134
September 6, 2014	Mansfield	United States	Xfinity Center	Justin Moore; Thomas Rhett	16,629 / 16,629	$658,549
September 11, 2014	Pensacola	United States	Pensacola Bay Center	Justin Moore; Thomas Rhett	7,896 / 8,751	—
September 12, 2014	Lafayette	United States	Cajundome	Justin Moore; Thomas Rhett	9,156 / 9,700	—
September 13, 2014	Corpus Christi	United States	American Bank Center	Justin Moore; Thomas Rhett	6,123 / 7,370	—
September 20, 2014	Honolulu	United States	Neal S. Blaisdell Center	Neal McCoy	6,219 / 6,219	$338,835
Certified Platinum Tour – North America Leg 2
January 15, 2015	Evansville	United States	Ford Center	Justin Moore; RaeLynn; Jukebox Mafia	—	—
January 16, 2015	Lexington	United States	Rupp Arena	Justin Moore; RaeLynn; Jukebox Mafia	—	—
January 17, 2015	Columbus	United States	Nationwide Arena	Justin Moore; RaeLynn; Jukebox Mafia	—	—
January 22, 2015	North Charleston	United States	North Charleston Coliseum	Justin Moore; RaeLynn; Jukebox Mafia	—	—
January 23, 2015	Knoxville	United States	Thompson–Boling Arena	Justin Moore; RaeLynn; Jukebox Mafia	—	—
January 24, 2015	Charleston	United States	Charleston Civic Center	Justin Moore; RaeLynn; Jukebox Mafia	—	—
February 12, 2015	Spokane	United States	Spokane Arena	Justin Moore; RaeLynn; Jukebox Mafia	—	—
February 13, 2015	Tacoma	United States	Tacoma Dome	Justin Moore; RaeLynn; Jukebox Mafia	—	—
February 14, 2015	Eugene	United States	Matthew Knight Arena	Justin Moore; RaeLynn; Jukebox Mafia	—	—
February 19, 2015	Toledo	United States	Huntington Center	Justin Moore; RaeLynn; Jukebox Mafia	—	—
February 20, 2015	Rockford	United States	BMO Harris Bank Center	Justin Moore; RaeLynn; Jukebox Mafia	—	—
February 21, 2015	Peoria	United States	Peoria Civic Center	Justin Moore; RaeLynn; Jukebox Mafia	—	—
February 26, 2015	Cape Girardeau	United States	Show Me Center	RaeLynn	—	—
February 27, 2015	North Little Rock	United States	Verizon Arena	—	—	—
February 28, 2015	Tulsa	United States	BOK Center	Justin Moore; RaeLynn	9,497 / 10,568	$520,640
March 5, 2015	Houston	United States	NRG Stadium	—	—	—
March 6, 2015	Oklahoma City	United States	Chesapeake Energy Arena	Justin Moore; Sunny Sweeney	—	—
March 7, 2015	Wichita	United States	Intrust Bank Arena	Justin Moore; Sunny Sweeney	9,908 / 10,342	$520,233
March 12, 2015	Dallas	United States	American Airlines Center	Justin Moore; Sunny Sweeney	12,045 / 12,045	$522,435
March 14, 2015	Cedar Rapids	United States	U.S. Cellular Center	Justin Moore; Sunny Sweeney	—	—
March 15, 2015	Grand Rapids	United States	Van Andel Arena	Justin Moore; Sunny Sweeney	9,768 / 9,768	$490,533
March 19, 2015	Birmingham	United States	BJCC	Justin Moore; Danielle Bradbery	—	—
March 20, 2015	Bossier City	United States	CenturyLink Center	Justin Moore; Danielle Bradbery	—	—
March 21, 2015	Biloxi	United States	Mississippi Coast Coliseum	Justin Moore; Danielle Bradbery	—	—
March 26, 2015	Hershey	United States	Giant Center	Justin Moore; Ashley Monroe	—	—
March 27, 2015	Atlantic City	United States	Boardwalk Hall	Justin Moore; Ashley Monroe	8,517 / 10,756	$540,175
March 28, 2015	New York City	United States	Madison Square Garden	Justin Moore; Ashley Monroe	—	—
April 9, 2015	Manchester	United States	Verizon Wireless Arena	Justin Moore; Ashley Monroe	—	—
April 10, 2015	Worcester	United States	DCU Center	Justin Moore; Ashley Monroe	7,156 / 8,100	$367,189
April 11, 2015	Uncasville	United States	Mohegan Sun Arena	Justin Moore	6,455 / 6,455	$484,665
April 25, 2015 ^{[E]}	Indio	United States	Stagecoach Festival	—	—	—
May 23, 2015	Ridgeland	United States	C-Spire Lawn	—	—	—
May 24, 2015	Baton Rouge	United States	Tiger Stadium	—	—	—
June 23, 2015	Oshkosh	United States	Country USA	—	—	—
June 27, 2015 ^{[F]}	Dover	United States	Dover International Speedway	—	—	—
June 28, 2015 ^{[G]}	Dauphin	Canada	Dauphin's Countryfest	—	—	—
July 9, 2015	Calgary	Canada	Scotiabank Saddledome	—	—	—
July 17, 2015 ^{[H]}	Minot	United States	North Dakota State Fair	—	—	—
July 18, 2015 ^{[I]}	Cheyenne	United States	Cheyenne Frontier Days	—	—	—
July 28, 2015	Nashville	United States	3rd & Lindsley Bar & Grill	—	—	—
August 7, 2015 ^{[J]}	Detroit Lakes	United States	WE Fest	—	—	—
September 3, 2015	Syracuse	United States	Lakeview Amphitheater	—	—	—
September 5, 2015^{[K]}	Panama City Beach	United States	Pepsi Gulf Coast Jam	—	—	—
September 19, 2015^{[L]}	Luckenbach	United States	Cause for the Paws	—	—	—
Roadside Bars & Pink Guitars Tour – North America Leg 3
September 24, 2015	Missoula	United States	Adams Center	RaeLynn; Clare Dunn; Courtney Cole	—	—
September 25, 2015	Billings	United States	Rimrock Auto Arena	RaeLynn; Clare Dunn; Courtney Cole	—	—
September 26, 2015	Rapid City	United States	Rushmore Plaza Civic Center	RaeLynn; Clare Dunn; Courtney Cole	—	—
September 27, 2015	Mankato	United States	Verizon Wireless Center	RaeLynn; Clare Dunn; Courtney Cole	—	—
October 2, 2015	Augusta	United States	James Brown Arena	RaeLynn; Clare Dunn; Courtney Cole	—	—
October 3, 2015	Fayetteville	United States	Crown Coliseum	RaeLynn; Clare Dunn; Courtney Cole	—	—
October 4, 2015	Roanoke	United States	Berglund Center	RaeLynn; Clare Dunn; Courtney Cole	—	—
October 8, 2015	Huntsville	United States	Von Braun Center	RaeLynn; Clare Dunn; Courtney Cole	—	—
October 9, 2015	Tupelo	United States	BancorpSouth Arena	RaeLynn; Clare Dunn; Courtney Cole	—	—
October 10, 2015	Jonesboro	United States	ASU Convocation Center	RaeLynn; Clare Dunn; Courtney Cole	—	—
October 15, 2015	La Crosse	United States	La Crosse Center	RaeLynn; Clare Dunn; Courtney Cole	—	—
October 16, 2015	Fort Wayne	United States	Allen County War Memorial Coliseum	RaeLynn; Clare Dunn; Courtney Cole	—	—
October 17, 2015	Moline	United States	iWireless Center	RaeLynn; Clare Dunn; Courtney Cole	—	—
October 19, 2015 (Note: The October 19, 2015 concert in Calgary at the Scotiabank Saddledome was originally planned to take place on July 9, but was rescheduled due to Lambert's illness.)	Calgary	Canada	Scotiabank Saddledome	—	—	—
March 7, 2016	Houston	United States	NRG Stadium	—	—	—
Europe
March 11, 2016 ^{[M]}	London	England	The O_{2} Arena	Dwight Yoakam; Thomas Rhett	—	—
March 12, 2016^{[M]}	Dublin	Ireland	3Arena	Dwight Yoakam; Thomas Rhett; Ashley Monroe	—	—
March 13, 2016^{[M]}	Glasgow	Scotland	Clyde Auditorium	Dwight Yoakam; Thomas Rhett; Ashley Monroe	—	—
Total				417,459 / 510,442 (82%)		$12,919,744

Fairs, festivals and other performances

- ^{A} This concerts was a part of the Country Concert at Hickory Hills Lake.
- ^{B} This concert was a part of the Great Jones County Fair.
- ^{C} This concert was a part of the Faster Horses Fest.
- ^{D} This concert was a part of the Oregon Jamboree.
- ^{E} This concert was a part of Stagecoach Festival.
- ^{F} This concert was a part of Big Barrel Country Music Festival.
- ^{G} This concert was a part of Dauphin's Countyfest.
- ^{H} This concert was a part of the North Dakota State Fair.
- ^{I} This concert was a part of Cheyenne Frontier Days.
- ^{J} This concert was a part of WE Fest.
- ^{K} This concert was a part of the Pepsi Gulf Coast Jam.
- ^{L} This concert was a part of Cause for the Paws.
- ^{M} These concerts are a part of the C2C: Country to Country music festival.

== Critical reception ==
Nate Chinen of the New York Times says, "She hit her marks, but seemed to be punching from a distance for the third of the show. It was as if she had grown weary of her own ironclad image, or the delivery system around it, or the many forms of upkeep required." "Whatever the case, as she labored, her band smoothly churned, with a balance of muscle and finesse."

The Wichita Eagle's Denise Neil remarked how Lambert thrilled the crowd at Intrust Bank Arena in Wichita.
