= Wildcard Tour =

2020 concert tour by Miranda Lambert

- Tour by Miranda Lambert
- Location: North America
- Associated album: Wildcard
- Start date: January 16, 2020
- End date: March 2, 2020
- Legs: 1
- No. of shows: 17

Miranda Lambert concert chronology
- Roadside Bars & Pink Guitars Tour (2019); Wildcard Tour (2020)

The Wildcard Tour was the tenth concert tour by American country music artist Miranda Lambert, in support of her seventh studio album Wildcard (2019). It began on January 16, 2020, in Tupelo, Mississippi at the BancorpSouth Arena and was scheduled to conclude on October 23, 2020, in Ottawa at the Canadian Tire Centre.

== Opening acts ==
American Texas country singer Cody Johnson and American country band LANCO served as supporting acts for most of the duration of the tour. Other supporting acts included Texan group Randy Rogers Band and American singer-songwriter Parker McCollum from February 6 to 8, 2020 in Kansas City, Tulsa and Dallas.

== Set list ==
The following set list is obtained from the January 16, 2020 show in Tupelo, Mississippi. It is not intended to represent all dates throughout the tour.

1. "White Trash"
2. "Kerosene"
3. "Mess With My Head"
4. "Famous in a Small Town"
5. "It All Comes Out in the Wash"
6. "Vice"
7. "Bluebird"
8. "Heart Like Mine"
9. "Over You"
10. "Airstream Song"
11. "Track Record"
12. "That's the Way That the World Goes' Round" (John Prine cover)
13. "Say You Love Me" (Fleetwood Mac cover)
14. "Feelin' Alright" (interlude)
15. "Baggage Claim"
16. "Locomotive"
17. "Gunpowder & Lead"
18. "Mama's Broken Heart"
19. "All Kinds of Kinds"
20. "The House That Built Me"
21. "Misery and Gin" (Merle Haggard cover)
22. "Tequila Does"
23. "Automatic"
24. "White Liar"
25. "Little Red Wagon"

Encore

26. "Pretty Bitchin'"

== Tour dates ==
List of concerts
Date (2020)	City	U.S. state	Venue	Opening act(s)	Attendance	Gross revenue
January 16	Tupelo	Mississippi	BancorpSouth Arena	Cody Johnson; LANCO	—	—
January 17	Biloxi	Mississippi	Mississippi Coast Coliseum	Cody Johnson; LANCO	—	—
January 18	Birmingham	Alabama	Legacy Arena	Cody Johnson; LANCO	—	—
January 23	North Little Rock	Arkansas	Simmons Bank Arena	Cody Johnson; LANCO	—	—
January 24	Nashville	Tennessee	Bridgestone Arena	Cody Johnson; LANCO	—	—
January 25	Evansville	Indiana	Ford Center	Cody Johnson; LANCO	—	—
February 6	Kansas City	Missouri	Sprint Center	Randy Rogers Band; Parker McCollum	—	—
February 7	Tulsa	Oklahoma	BOK Center	Randy Rogers Band; Parker McCollum	—	—
February 8	Dallas	Texas	American Airlines Center	Randy Rogers Band; Parker McCollum	—	—
February 20	Anaheim	California	Honda Center	Cody Johnson; LANCO	—	—
February 21	San Diego	California	Viejas Arena	Cody Johnson; LANCO	—	—
February 22	Ontario	California	Toyota Arena	Cody Johnson; LANCO	—	—
February 25 (Note: This show was originally scheduled to take place on January 31, 2020.)	Salt Lake City	Utah	Vivint Smart Home Arena	Cody Johnson; LANCO	—	—
February 27	Fresno	California	Save Mart Center	Cody Johnson; LANCO	—	—
February 28	San Jose	California	SAP Center	Cody Johnson; LANCO	—	—
February 29	Sacramento	California	Golden 1 Center	Cody Johnson; LANCO	—	—
March 2 (Note: This show was originally scheduled to take place on February 1, 2020)	Denver	Colorado	Pepsi Center	Cody Johnson; LANCO	—	—
Total				Cody Johnson; LANCO	—	—

== Cancelled Dates ==
List of cancelled concerts
Date (2020)	City	Country	Venue	Opening act(s)	Attendance	Gross revenue
October 8 (Note: This show was originally scheduled to take place on April 24, 2020)	Spokane	United States	Spokane Arena	—	—	—
October 9 (Note: This show was originally scheduled to take place on April 23, 2020)	Nampa	United States	Ford Idaho Center	—	—	—
October 11 (Note: This show was originally scheduled to take place on April 25, 2020)	Vancouver	Canada	Rogers Arena	—	—	—
October 14 (Note: This show was originally scheduled to take place on April 30, 2020)	Edmonton	Canada	Rogers Place	—	—	—
October 16 (Note: This show was originally scheduled to take place on May 1, 2020)	Regina	Canada	Brandt Centre	—	—	—
October 17 (Note: This show was originally scheduled to take place on May 2, 2020)	Winnipeg	Canada	Bell MTS Place	—	—	—
October 20 (Note: This show was originally scheduled to take place on May 5, 2020)	London	Canada	Budweiser Gardens	—	—	—
October 21 (Note: This show was originally scheduled to take place on May 9, 2020)	Montreal	Canada	Bell Centre	—	—	—
October 22 (Note: This show was originally scheduled to take place on May 7, 2020)	Oshawa	Canada	Tribute Communities Centre	—	—	—
October 23 (Note: This show was originally scheduled to take place on May 8, 2020)	Ottawa	Canada	Canadian Tire Centre	—	—	—
Total					—	—
