= 2012 Country Music Association Awards =

Annual US music awards ceremony

- Date: November 1, 2012
- Location: Bridgestone Arena, Nashville, Tennessee, U.S.
- Hosted by: Brad Paisley; Carrie Underwood

Highlights
- Most wins: Blake Shelton (3)
- Most nominations: Eric Church (5)

Television/radio coverage
- Network: ABC
- Viewership: 13.4 million

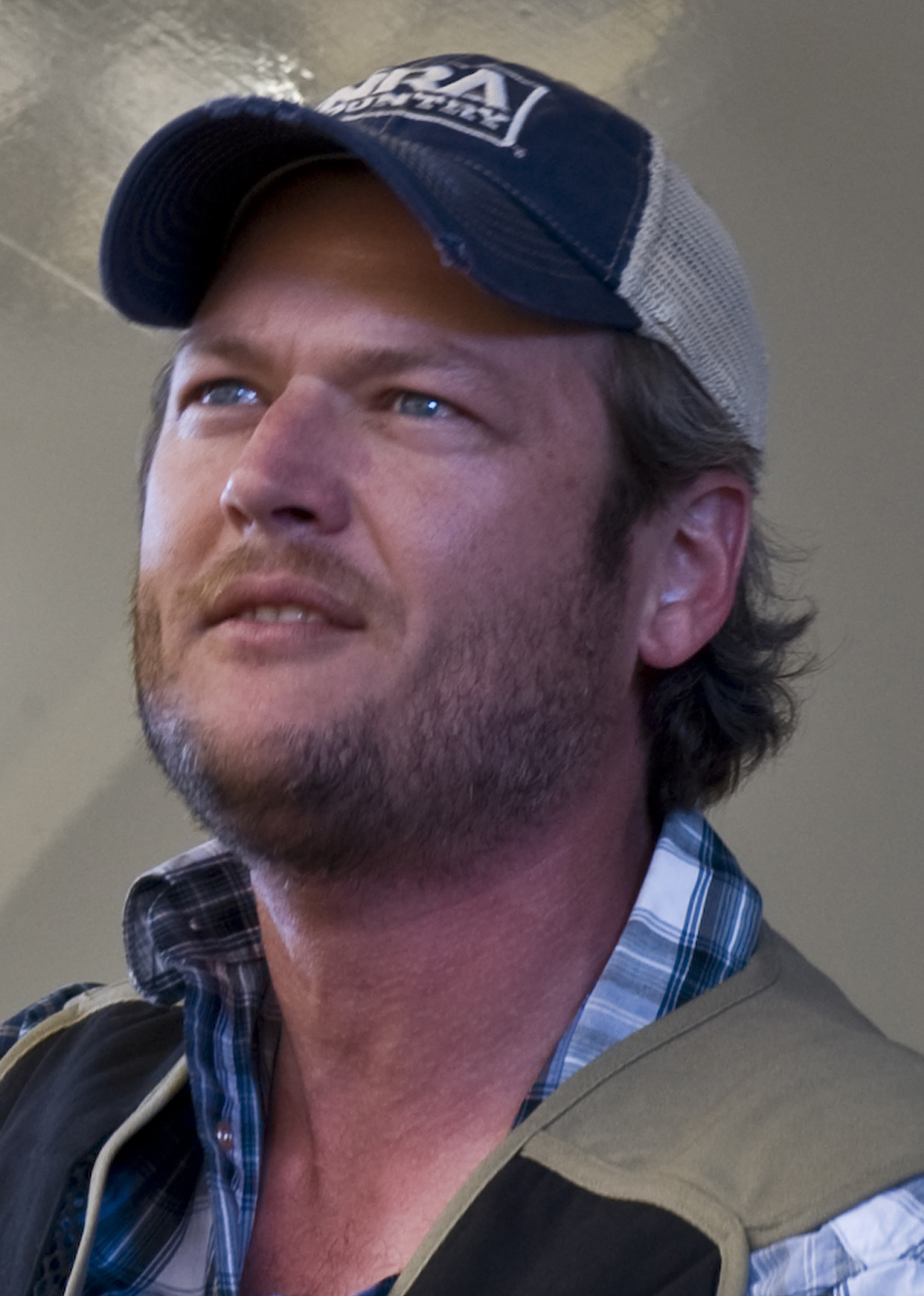
Blake Shelton, Entertainer of the Year recipient.

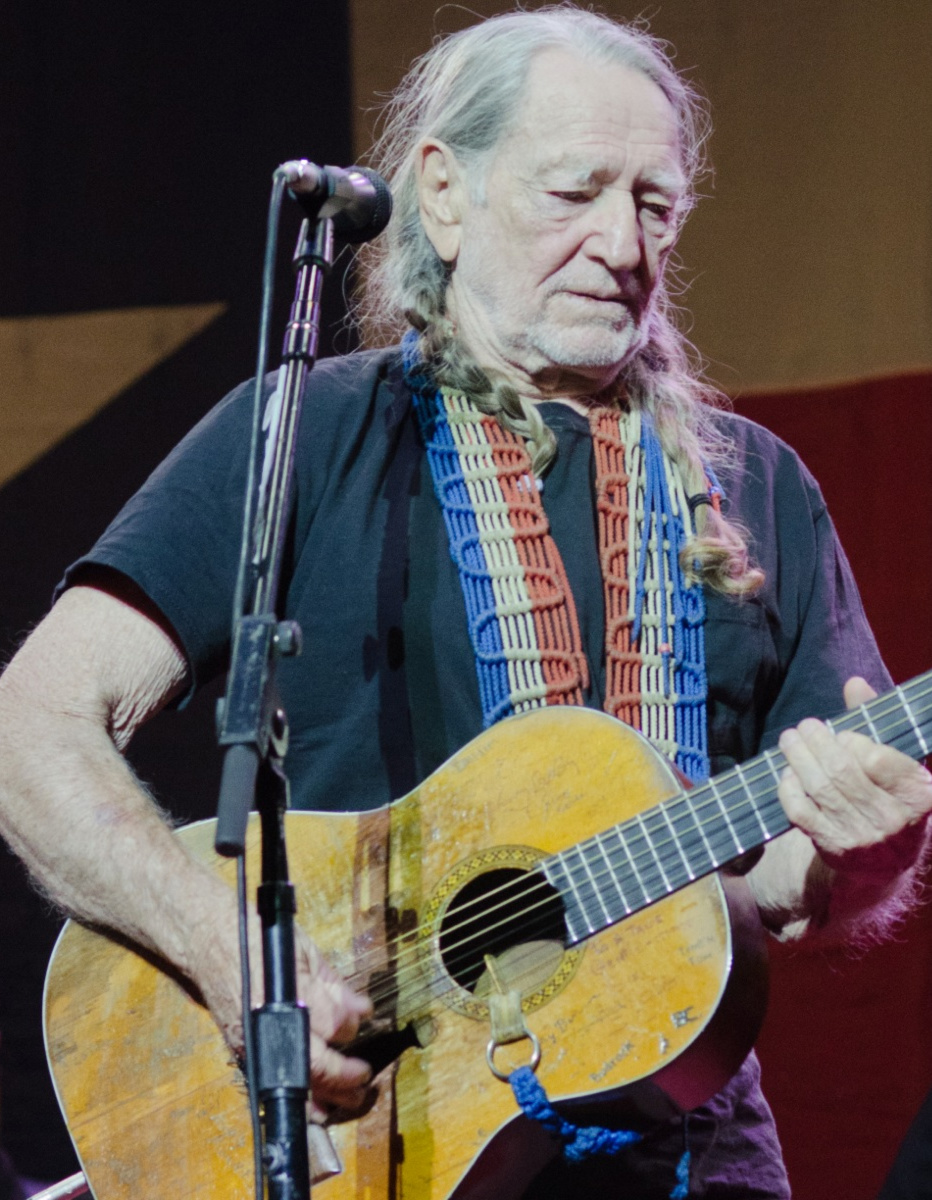
Willie Nelson, inaugural and eponymous recipient of the Willie Nelson Lifetime Achievement Award.

The 2012 Country Music Association Awards, 46th Annual Ceremony, is a music award ceremony that was held on November 1, 2012, at the Bridgestone Arena in Nashville, Tennessee and was hosted by Brad Paisley and Carrie Underwood for their fifth consecutive time together.

== Winners and nominees ==
Winners are shown in bold.

Entertainer of the Year	Album of the Year
**Blake Shelton**; Jason Aldean; Kenny Chesney; Brad Paisley; Taylor Swift	**Chief** — **Eric Church**; Tailgates & Tanlines — Luke Bryan; Four the Record — Miranda Lambert; Home — Dierks Bentley; Own the Night — Lady Antebellum
Male Vocalist of the Year	Female Vocalist of the Year
**Blake Shelton**; Jason Aldean; Luke Bryan; Eric Church; Keith Urban	**Miranda Lambert**; Kelly Clarkson; Martina McBride; Taylor Swift; Carrie Underwood
Vocal Group of the Year	Vocal Duo of the Year
**Little Big Town**; Eli Young Band; Lady Antebellum; The Band Perry; Zac Brown Band	**Thompson Square**; Big & Rich; Love and Theft; Sugarland; The Civil Wars
Single of the Year	Song of the Year (Songwriters' Award)
**"Pontoon"** — **Little Big Town**; "Dirt Road Anthem" — Jason Aldean; "God Gave Me You" — Blake Shelton; "Home" — Dierks Bentley; "Springsteen" — Eric Church	**"Over You"** — **Miranda Lambert and Blake Shelton**; "Even If It Breaks Your Heart" — Will Hoge and Eric Paslay; "God Gave Me You" — Dave Barnes; "Home" — Dierks Bentley and John Randall Stewart; "Springsteen" — Eric Church, Jeff Hyde and Ryan Tyndell
New Artist of the Year	Musician of the Year
**Hunter Hayes**; Lee Brice; Brantley Gilbert; Love and Theft; Thompson Square	**Mac McAnally**; Sam Bush; Paul Franklin; Dann Huff; Brent Mason
Music Video of the Year	Musical Event of the Year
**"Red Solo Cup"** — **Toby Keith; (Dir. Michael Salomon)**; "Springsteen" — Eric Church; (Dir. Peter Zavadil); "Come Over" — Kenny Chesney; (Dir. Shaun Silva); "Over You" — Miranda Lambert; (Dir. Trey Fanjoy); "Pontoon" — Little Big Town; (Dir. Declan Whitebloom)	**"Feel Like a Rock Star"** — **Tim McGraw and Kenny Chesney**; "Dixie Highway" — Alan Jackson and Zac Brown Band; "Roll Me Up and Smoke Me When I Die" — Willie Nelson, Snoop Dogg, Kris Kristofferson, and Jamey Johnson; "Safe & Sound" — Taylor Swift and The Civil Wars; "Stuck On You" — Lionel Richie and Darius Rucker
Willie Nelson Lifetime Achievement Award
**Willie Nelson**

== Hall of Fame ==
Country Music Hall of Fame
- Garth Brooks
- Hargus "Pig" Robbins
- Connie Smith

== Performers ==
Artist(s)	Song(s)
Jason Aldean; Luke Bryan; Eric Church	"The Only Way I Know"
Tim McGraw	"One of Those Nights"
Miranda Lambert	"Fastest Girl in Town"
Zac Brown Band	"Goodbye in Her Eyes"
Dierks Bentley	"Tip It On Back"
Eli Young Band	"Even If It Breaks Your Heart"
Eric Church	"Springsteen"
Taylor Swift	"Begin Again"
Little Big Town	"Pontoon"
Luke Bryan	"Kiss Tomorrow Goodbye"
Hunter Hayes	"Wanted"
Keith Urban; Zac Brown Band	"Georgia Woods"
Faith Hill	"American Heart"
Brad Paisley	"Southern Comfort Zone"
Brantley Gilbert	"Country Must Be Country Wide"
Jason Aldean	"Take a Little Ride"
Carrie Underwood	"Blown Away"
Kelly Clarkson; Vince Gill	"Don't Rush"
Kenny Chesney	"Come Over"
Lady Antebellum; Keith Urban; Blake Shelton; Tim McGraw; Faith Hill; Willie Nelson	Willie Nelson Lifetime Achievement Award honoring Willie Nelson "Always on My Mind" "Crazy" "Whiskey River" "Good Hearted Woman" "On the Road Again"

== Presenters ==
Presenter(s)	Award
Lisa Marie Presley	Single of the Year
Jana Kramer and Jake Owen	Vocal Duo of the Year
Kellie Pickler and Darius Rucker	Song of the Year
Sugarland	Album of the Year
The Band Perry	New Artist of the Year
Scotty McCreery and Shawn Johnson East	Vocal Group of the Year
Martina McBride	Male Vocalist of the Year
Connie Britton, Hayden Panettiere and Kimberly Williams-Paisley	Female Vocalist of the Year
Reba McEntire and Tim Allen	Entertainer of the Year
