= Miranda Lambert =

American country singer (born 1983)

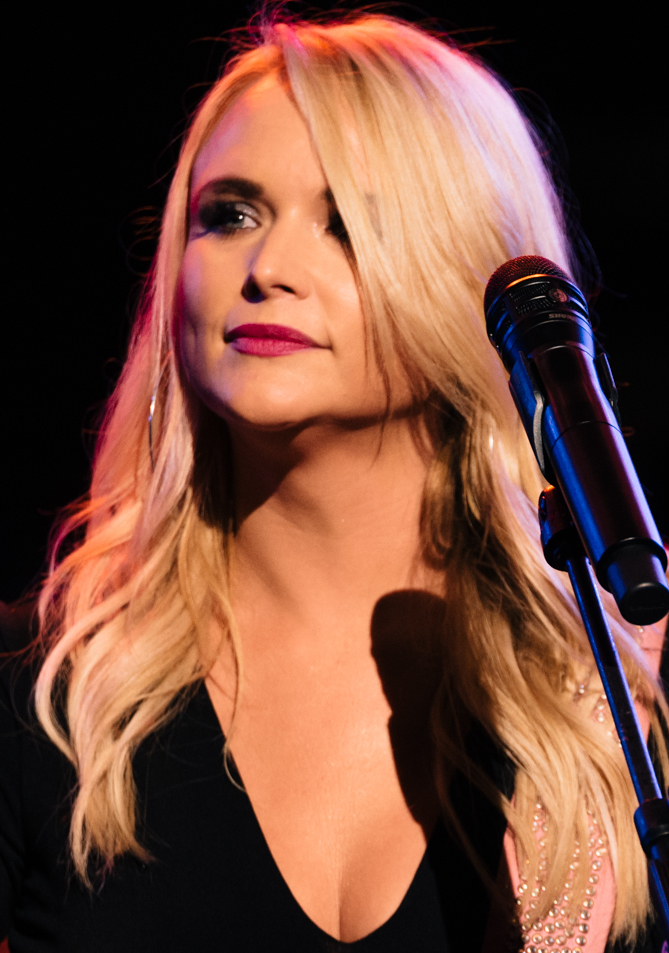
- Lambert in 2019 on her Bandwagon tour

Background information
- Born: Miranda Leigh Lambert; November 10, 1983 (age 43); Longview, Texas, U.S.
- Origin: Lindale, Texas, U.S.
- Genres: Country; country pop
- Occupation: Singer-songwriter
- Instruments: Vocals; guitar
- Years active: 2000–present
- Labels: Epic Nashville; Columbia Nashville; RCA Nashville; Vanner; Republic Nashville; Big Loud
- Member of: Pistol Annies
- Spouses: Blake Shelton (m. 2011; div. 2015) Brendan McLoughlin (m. 2019)
- Awards: Full list
- Website: mirandalambert.com www.pistolannies.com

Miranda Leigh Lambert McLoughlin (née Lambert; formerly Shelton; born November 10, 1983) is an American country music singer–songwriter. Born in Longview, Texas, she started out in early 2001 when she released her self-titled debut album independently. In 2003, she finished in third place on the television program Nashville Star, a singing competition that aired on the USA Network. Outside her solo career, she is a member of the Pistol Annies, a group she formed in 2011 alongside Ashley Monroe and Angaleena Presley. Lambert has been honored by the Grammy Awards, the Academy of Country Music Awards and the Country Music Association Awards. Lambert has been honored with more Academy of Country Music Awards than any artist in history. In 2024, Lambert was awarded the Country Icon Award at the People's Choice Country Awards.

After signing with Epic Records, she released Kerosene in 2005, her first Epic album and second overall. It was certified Platinum in the United States and produced the singles "Me and Charlie Talking", "Bring Me Down", "Kerosene" and "New Strings". All four singles reached the top 40 on the Billboard Hot Country Songs. Her second album, Crazy Ex-Girlfriend, was released in early 2007. Three of its singles ("Famous in a Small Town", "Gunpowder & Lead" and "More Like Her") peaked within the top 20 on the country songs chart, with "Gunpowder & Lead" becoming her first top 10 entry in July 2008. Her third album, Revolution, was released in September 2009. Two of its songs – "The House That Built Me" and "Heart Like Mine" – topped the Hot Country Songs chart.

2011's Four the Record included the singles "Baggage Claim", "Over You", "Fastest Girl in Town", "Mama's Broken Heart" and "All Kinds of Kinds". Lambert released her fifth album, Platinum, in 2014. The record won the Grammy Award for Best Country Album, and the album's lead single, "Automatic", reached the top five on the Country charts. Her sixth studio album, The Weight of These Wings, was released on November 18, 2016, and subsequently certified Platinum by the Recording Industry Association of America (RIAA). Her seventh studio album, Wildcard, was released on November 1, 2019, and went on to win the Grammy Award for Best Country Album in early 2021. Three singles from the album ("It All Comes Out in the Wash", "Bluebird", "Settling Down") reached the top 20 of the country music charts, and the album's second official single, "Bluebird", became Lambert's first song to top the Billboard Country Airplay Chart as a solo artist since 2012.

She later collaborated with singer-songwriters Jon Randall and Jack Ingram for the album The Marfa Tapes, departing from her usual sound and opting for an acoustic, stripped-down feel. It was released on May 7, 2021, to acclaim from critics. Lambert released her eighth solo album, Palomino, on April 29, 2022. The same year she was listed on Time 100 by Time. Lambert co-wrote and co-produced "Choosin' Texas", a 2025 single by Ella Langley that is the longest-running number one on the Billboard Hot 100.

== Early life ==
Miranda Leigh Lambert was born November 10, 1983, to Rick and Bev (née Hughes) Lambert in Longview, Texas, and was raised in Lindale, Texas. She was named after her great-grandmother, Lucy Miranda. She has one younger brother.

Her parents met while her mother was attending camp at Southern Methodist University where her father was an on-campus undercover narcotics officer, and they got together a few years later. Her father is a former Dallas police officer who played in a country-rock group called Contraband in the 1970s. Her parents later became private detectives and were hired by lawyers for Paula Jones in the Clinton v. Jones case. After the oil crisis dampened the economy in Texas, her family lost everything.

After the downturn, things got better and her parents began a faith-based ministry and offered their home as a shelter for the victims of domestic violence and their children. Miranda has said that this experience fueled her music and that her song "Gunpowder & Lead" is a reflection of that.

While still in high school, Lambert made her professional singing debut with "The Texas Pride Band". She also fronted the house band at the Reo Palm Isle in Longview, Texas, a long-running venue that had featured Elvis Presley and Willie Nelson, and the place where Brooks & Dunn started out as the house band.

== Music career ==
=== 2000–2003: Career beginnings, self-titled debut album, and Nashville Star ===
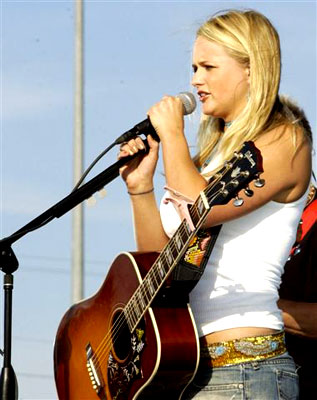
Lambert performing at Laughlin AFB in 2006

At 16, Lambert appeared on the Johnnie High Country Music Revue in Arlington, Texas, the same talent show that had helped launch the career of LeAnn Rimes. Lambert then acquired a recording session in Nashville, Tennessee, but left the studio after she became frustrated with the "pop" type of music presented to her. She went back to Texas in 2000 and asked her father to teach her how to play guitar, so she could write her own songs. In 2001, she released her self-titled debut album that consisted of 10 tracks.

In 2002, Dusty Meador hired Lambert to perform at Tye Phelps' country music restaurant and venue Love and War in Texas. Lambert continued to perform around the Texas Music Scene opening for Cooder Graw, Kevin Fowler, and Jack Ingram. In 2003, she auditioned for the talent competition Nashville Star, where she earned a third-place finish behind Buddy Jewell and John Arthur Martinez. During her 9-week stay on Nashville Star, Lambert caught the attention of the show's judge and Sony Music executive, Tracy Gershon, who later convinced the label to sign her.

=== 2004–2008: Kerosene and Crazy Ex- Girlfriend ===
On September 15, 2003, she signed with Epic Records. Her debut single, "Me and Charlie Talking", co-written by her father and Heather Little, was released in summer of 2004 as the lead single to her first Epic album, titled Kerosene. This album was also her first to be produced by Frank Liddell, best known for his work with his wife Lee Ann Womack and David Nail. Lambert wrote 11 of the album's 12 songs. The album debuted at number one on the Billboard Top Country Albums charts, and eventually gained a Platinum certification by the RIAA for shipments of over one million copies, selling more than 930,000 copies up to July 2008. Overall, the album produced four Top 40 singles on the Billboard country charts, including the title track that became a Top 20 hit. Lambert also toured with Keith Urban and George Strait in early 2006. In 2007, she toured with Dierks Bentley and Toby Keith. On Thursday, August 7, 2007 Miranda played at the famous Sikeston Jaycee Bootheel Rodeo in Sikeston, Missouri.

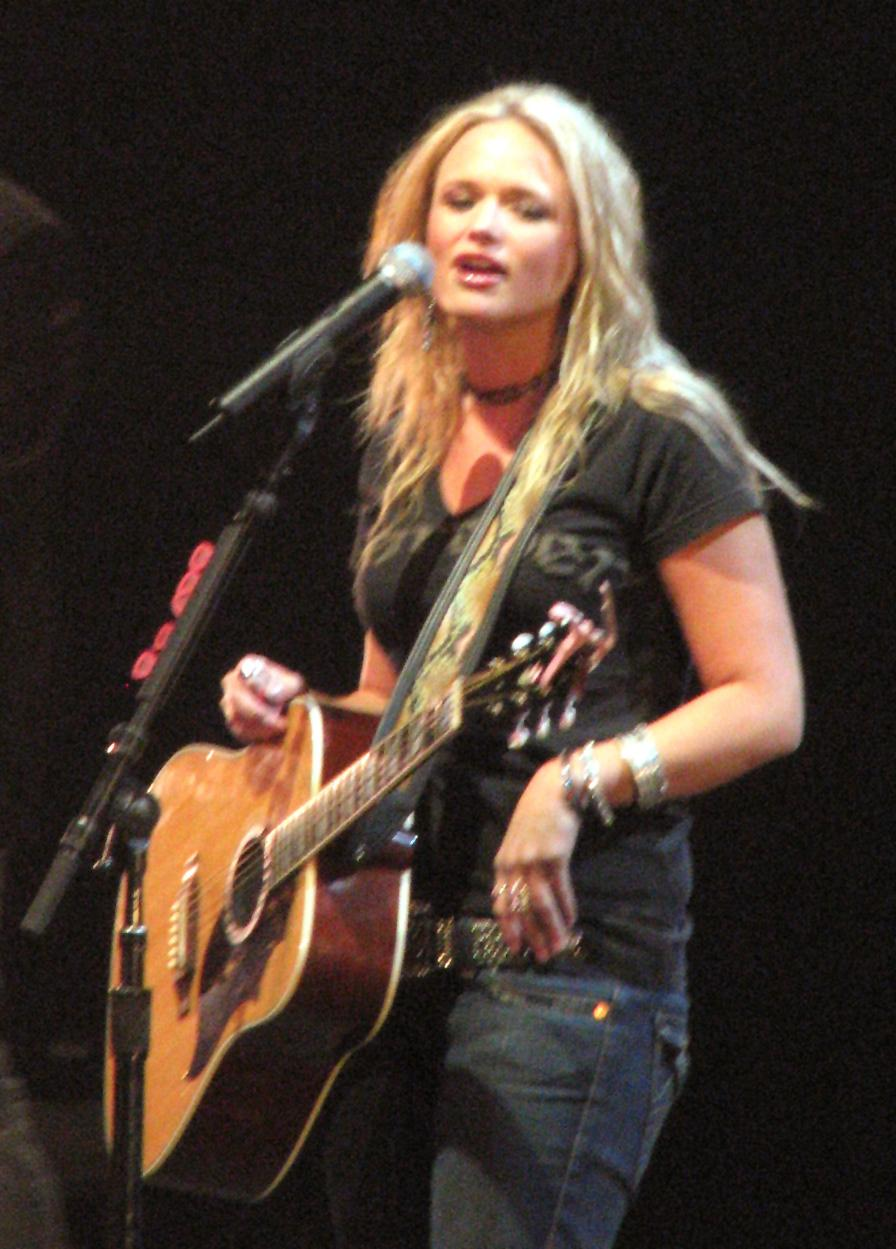
Lambert on stage, in Pontiac, Michigan, March 31, 2007

Lambert's second album, Crazy Ex-Girlfriend, was released on May 1, 2007. She wrote eight of the album's 11 tracks, including its four singles. Much of the track "Gunpowder & Lead", the album's third single and her highest-charting single, was written while she was taking a concealed-carry handgun class in her home town. Fady Joudah of The New Yorker said the album proved "she has talent and charisma on a par with Dolly Parton, another blond beauty who was once underestimated."

In 2005, at the 40th Annual Academy of Country Music Awards in Las Vegas, Lambert won the CoverGirl "Fresh Face of Country Music Award". She was also nominated for the Country Music Association's Horizon Award in 2005; in 2007, Lambert also received a Grammy Award nomination for Best Female Country Vocal Performance for her single "Kerosene". She also won the Top New Female Vocalist award at the 2007 ACM (Academy of Country Music) Awards. At the 2008 ACM (Academy of Country Music) Awards, Crazy Ex-Girlfriend won Album of the Year.

=== 2009–2011: Revolution ===
Lambert released her third album, Revolution, on September 29, 2009. She co-wrote 11 of the album's 15 tracks; the album also includes co-writes from Dave Haywood and Charles Kelley of Lady Antebellum and Blake Shelton.

Revolution received significant critical praise on its release. At Metacritic the album received an average score of 85, based on 11 reviews, which indicates "universal acclaim". The album also received positive reviews from Rolling Stone, Boston Globe and Slant Magazine. Entertainment Weekly called the release "the best mainstream-country album so far this year".

Lambert debuted her new single, "Dead Flowers", at the 44th annual Academy of Country Music Awards on April 5, 2009. It was released on May 4, 2009, and was a minor Top 40 hit on the charts. The album's second single, "White Liar", was released on August 17, 2009, and debuted at No. 50 on the U.S. Billboard Hot Country Songs chart. In February 2010, "White Liar" became Lambert's first Top Five hit, reaching a peak of No. 2 on the U.S. Billboard Hot Country Songs chart.

The House That Built Me, the album's third single, was released on March 8, 2010, and became a No. 1 on the U.S. Billboard Hot Country Songs chart. It stayed there for four weeks, and received platinum certification from the RIAA on July 8, 2010. "Only Prettier" followed as the album's fourth single in July 2010, and its accompanying music video went viral. The music video for "Only Prettier" featured cameo appearances by fellow country artists Kellie Pickler, Laura Bell Bundy, and Hillary Scott of Lady Antebellum. In December 2010, "Only Prettier" reached a peak of number 12 on the U.S. Billboard Hot Country Songs chart, giving Lambert her seventh Top 20 hit. "Heart Like Mine" was released in January 2011 as the fifth and final single from Revolution. It became Lambert's second number-one hit on the country charts for the chart dated May 28, 2011.

In promotion of Revolution, Lambert launched a headlining tour; Roadside Bars & Pink Guitars in March 2010, with stops in 22 cities and a performance at the Bonnaroo Music Festival.

On September 1, 2010, it was announced that Lambert had received a record-setting 9 CMA award nominations. She performed at the 44th Annual Country Music Association Awards on November 10, 2010. She won the CMA Award for Female Vocalist of the Year, and her Revolution won Album of the Year. Lambert and Sheryl Crow performed "Coal Miner's Daughter" as a tribute to country legend Loretta Lynn who also entered the stage to join them and finished the song with Crow and Lambert as backup. Later that night, Lynn presented the Female Vocalist of the Year CMA award to Lambert. On February 13, 2011, Lambert won a Grammy Award in the Best Female Country Vocal Performance category for "The House That Built Me".

=== 2011–2013: Four the Record and the Pistol Annies ===
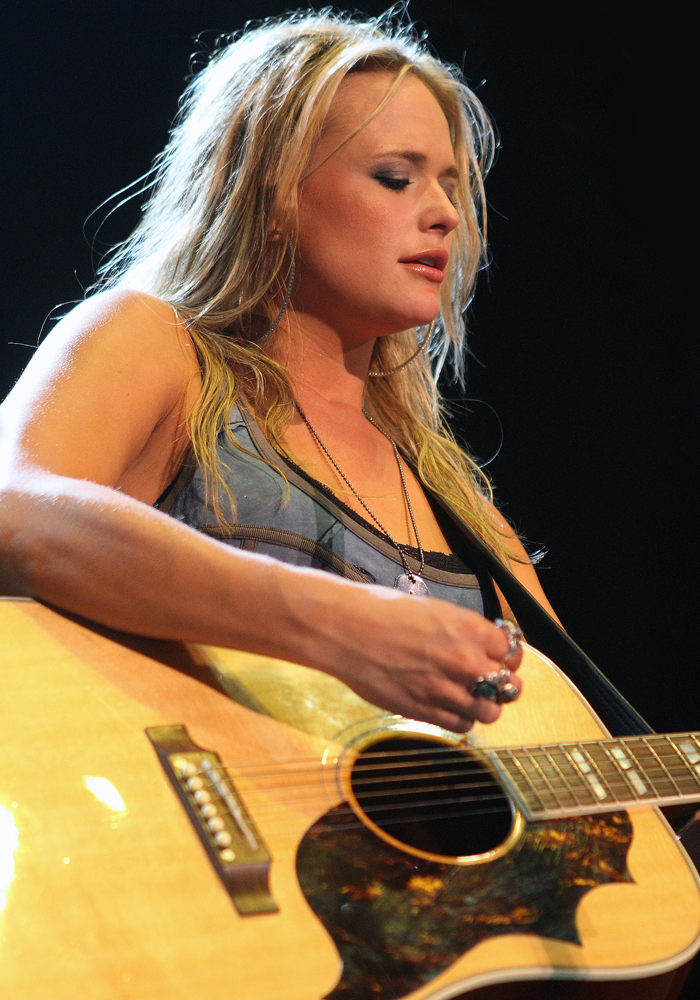
Miranda Lambert performing in Dallas, Texas, July 1, 2007

On April 4, 2011, during the taping of the Academy of Country Music's 'Girls' Night Out' television special in Las Vegas, Lambert debuted her new project, girl group Pistol Annies. The group consists of Lambert, Ashley Monroe, and Angaleena Presley. They released their single, "Hell on Heels", in May 2011, and released their debut album, Hell on Heels, on August 23, 2011, which debuted at No. 1 on Billboard's country chart. Sasha Frere-Jones of The New Yorker said the trio "is good enough to recall those transcendent moments of vocal harmony the Dixie Chicks used to hit every few months".

Lambert's fourth studio album, Four the Record, was released on November 1, 2011; her first album for RCA Nashville, after Sony Music Nashville announced a corporate restructuring. Four the Record produced five singles: "Baggage Claim", "Over You", "Fastest Girl in Town", "Mama's Broken Heart" and "All Kinds of Kinds". "Over You", which Lambert and Shelton co-wrote, reached number 1 in early 2012.

On February 8, 2012, Lambert made her acting debut on NBC's long-running legal drama, Law & Order: Special Victims Unit in an episode titled "Father's Shadow". Lambert later told CMT News she was a big fan of the show: "I never wanted to act. I still don't. I don't want to be an actress. I just wanted to be on that show mainly so I could be a groupie [for their autographs]."

Late in 2012, Lambert appeared on Shelton's Christmas album Cheers, It's Christmas, to which she contributed guest vocals on a version of "Jingle Bell Rock". The soundtrack was released on October 2, 2012. On October 23, 2012, Lambert and Dierks Bentley announced the co-headlined 33-show Locked & Reloaded Tour, which began on January 17, 2013.

On May 7, 2013, a second Pistol Annies album, Annie Up, was released. This album produced the group's first country chart entry with "Hush Hush". The Pistol Annies are also one of many acts featured on Blake Shelton's 2013 single "Boys 'Round Here", which went to number 1 on Country Airplay. They had previously accompanied Shelton on a rendition of "Blue Christmas" on Cheers, It's Christmas.

=== 2014–2015: Platinum ===
"Automatic", the lead single from Lambert's fifth studio album, Platinum, was released on February 5, 2014, to praise from music critics. The album, containing 16 songs, was released on June 3, 2014. The album's second single, "Somethin' Bad", is a duet with Carrie Underwood and was debuted on the 2014 Billboard Music Awards on May 18. The album's third single, "Little Red Wagon", was released to country radio on January 12, 2015. The album's fourth single, "Smokin' and Drinkin'", released to country radio on June 22, 2015.

=== 2016–2018: The Weight of These Wings and third Pistol Annies album ===
In March 2016, Lambert made her first ever performances outside the US and Canada as one of the headliners of C2C: Country to Country, Europe's biggest country music festival, which saw Lambert play in England, Scotland and Ireland alongside Dwight Yoakam, Thomas Rhett and Ashley Monroe. On July 18, 2016, Lambert released "Vice" to country radio and digital outlets. Written by Lambert, Shane McAnally and Josh Osborne, it was her first song released since Platinum. In September, Lambert announced her sixth studio album, The Weight of These Wings, which was released on November 18, 2016. She was selected as one of 30 artists to perform on "Forever Country", a mashup track of "Take Me Home, Country Roads", "On the Road Again" and "I Will Always Love You", celebrating 50 years of the CMA Awards. Shortly after the release of The Weight of These Wings, the Highway Vagabond Tour was announced and began on January 24, 2017. These were Lambert's first live shows since she was put on mandatory vocal rest and was forced to cancel her Keeper of the Flame Tour in 2016. The tour visited the US, Canada and were her first solo shows in Europe, seeing her return to England, Ireland, Scotland and, for the first time, the Netherlands.

After promotion and touring for The Weight of These Wings ended, the Pistol Annies reformed and released their third studio album Interstate Gospel on November 2, 2018, which subsequently reached number 1 on the Billboard Country Albums Chart.

=== 2019–2020: Wildcard ===
Lambert announced that the lead-off single from her seventh studio album would be "It All Comes Out in the Wash", which was released on July 18, 2019. The song was co-written by Lambert with Hillary Lindsey, Lori McKenna, and Liz Rose ("Love Junkies") and produced by Jay Joyce, marking the first time she had worked with the producer. The song was released alongside "Locomotive", another track intended for the upcoming album that she had previously debuted on the CMA Music Festival in June 2019. Two other tracks—"Mess with My Head" and "Bluebird"—were also previewed ahead of the album in August 2019.

Lambert's seventh studio album, Wildcard, was released on November 1, 2019. In promotion of the album, Lambert announced the 27-date Wildcard Tour, which was set to begin on January 16, 2020, and run through May 9, 2020, but which had to be cancelled due to the coronavirus pandemic. Several solo acoustic live performances of "Bluebird" premiered on her Instagram and YouTube channels during this time, and she performed the song at the belated and socially-distanced 2020 ACMs, at which she won an award for Music Event of the Year for her collaboration with other female country artists, "Fooled Around and Fell in Love".

On the chart dated August 1, 2020, "Bluebird" became Lambert's first number 1 single on the Billboard Country Airplay chart as a solo artist since 2012's "Over You", and her fifth career number 1 on the chart. "Bluebird" was also a critical success, nominated for three CMA awards, two Grammy Awards, and three ACM awards, winning the CMA Award for Best Music Video.

"Settling Down" was released as the third official single from Wildcard on September 21, 2020, and Lambert performed the song live at the 2020 CMAs with just two guitarists backing. As of May 10, 2021, the song had reached the top 10 of both the Billboard Hot Country Songs Chart and the Billboard Country Airplay Chart, making it her 14th career top 10 hit on the Country Airplay Chart and her 16th on the Hot Country Songs Chart.

The album Wildcard went on to be nominated for both ACM and CMA Album of the Year, and won the 2021 Grammy for the Best Country Album on 15 March. She performed "Bluebird" at the awards ceremony.

=== 2021–2022: The Marfa Tapes, Palomino, and Pistol Annies' Hell of a Holiday ===
Lambert hinted at an upcoming project with longtime friends and collaborators Jon Randall and Jack Ingram via her social media accounts on March 2, 2021, before announcing their upcoming collaborative acoustic record The Marfa Tapes in the following days, to be released on May 7. The tracklist was announced, with Lambert's previously recorded songs "Tin Man" and "Tequila Does" both set to be featured on the album, and the first new song In His Arms was premiered with a video on March 5. The album was recorded in Marfa, Texas towards the end of 2020 with just two microphones and two acoustic guitars, and was said to have an unpolished feel, with one-take recordings retaining mistakes and snapshots of conversations between the three, and the sound of the campfire and the desert in the background. It would contain 15 songs the three singer-songwriters had written together over a period of six years, beginning in July 2015.

In His Arms was performed live by Lambert, Randall and Ingram at the 2021 ACM Awards, and at the awards show Lambert also performed "Drunk (And I Don't Wanna Go Home)" with Elle King, and she also stood in last-minute for Chris Stapleton's wife Morgane Stapleton to sing harmony on Stapleton's performance of Maggie's Song.

The new recording of "Tin Man", alongside previously unheard tracks "Am I Right or Amarillo" and "Geraldene" were also pre-released before the album's release on May 7, and the trio performed "Geraldene" live on The Ellen Show later in the month. Around this time, Miranda Lambert replied to a comment regarding her band the Pistol Annies in the comments section of her Instagram post, fuelling speculation that a new Pistol Annies project might be in the works for 2021. Lambert subsequently revealed that she "didn't do much in the beginning of 2020. [She] just sort of enjoyed the break... And then in the last six months or so [she] kind of worked overtime to make up for lost time", and that an upcoming solo record was therefore in the works. She commented in the same article that she was considering re-recording several tracks from The Marfa Tapes for this record, including "In His Arms" and "Geraldene", and potentially other personal favourites, such as "Waxahachie".

The trio announced that alongside the record, they would be released 'The Marfa Tapes' film on Lambert's Facebook page to be available for 24 hours from May 8, which would feature acoustic performances from the record alongside interviews and behind-the-scenes footage from the recording process of the album.

The Marfa Tapes album was released to critical acclaim on May 7, with critics applauding Lambert's musical risk-taking and the simple but effective songwriting. Pitchfork commented, "Somewhere between a demo collection, a live album with no audience, and a lo-fi left turn, this music is a joy to hear, like a vacation on record", and Variety questioned whether this might even be Lambert's best record so far, "And like her bigger, broader sounding albums, she gives as good as she gets, quietly, while sounding as grand as if she had a studio band's excess at work." The film premiered on Lambert's Facebook page on May 8, featuring original songs not previously seen and not included on The Marfa Tapes, the first of which was "Tornado" — co-written by Lambert, Randall and Ingram — and also a Lambert solo-written piece, "They've Closed Down the Honky-Tonks".

In the week following the album's release, the trio performed lead single "In His Arms" once more, on The Late Show with Stephen Colbert.

On October 15, she released the lead single from her upcoming studio album, "If I Was A Cowboy", on October 15. The song's first video was uploaded to YouTube on October 15, and a later official video was uploaded to YouTube on January 12, 2022. The single has been a moderate hit on the country singles charts, so far reaching the top 20 of both the Country Airplay Chart and the Hot Country Songs Chart.

The Pistol Annies announced the release of their first Christmas album, Hell of a Holiday, which was released October 22, 2021. It contains 10 original songs, a cover of Merle Haggard's "If We Make It Through December", popular Christmas classic "Sleigh Ride", and traditional New Year's song "Auld Lang Syne". The album was well-received for its original content, and Billboard praised their cover of "If We Make It Through December" as "One of the most striking moments on Hell of a Holiday". They performed many of the songs and discussed the album on December 15's "The Pistol Annies Hell of a Holiday Special", which was made available on Facebook.

On December 30, 2021, Lambert released "Y'all Means All" in support of the LGBTQ community. The song was used in the trailer for the sixth season of Queer Eye. In March 2022 she won Entertainer of the Year at the American Country Music Awards.

Lambert and Elle King's 2021 collaboration "Drunk (And I Don't Wanna Go Home)" was certified platinum in February, and the two performed the song together at the Ryman Auditorium on Feb 28th to celebrate. The single has so far reached the top 10 of the country charts.

Lambert released a teaser for a new song titled "Strange" ahead of the ACM Awards, which were held on March 7 in Vegas. She was nominated for 5 awards, marking her record-breaking 16th nomination for Female Vocalist of the Year, and she won Video of the Year for "Drunk (And I Don't Wanna Go Home)", and as well as the top prize of the night, Entertainer of the Year, for the first time in her career. This brings her tally of total ACM Awards won to 37, the most of all time, and also meant that she is eligible for the ACM's rare and coveted Triple Crown Award.

On March 10, Lambert released "Strange" alongside a video on her YouTube channel, and announced her eighth solo studio album, Palomino, which was released on April 29. The album includes "If I Was a Cowboy" and "Strange", alongside three re-recorded tracks from her 2021 Marfa Tapes album with Jon Randall and Jack Ingram: "Geraldene", "In His Arms", and "Waxahachie".

Lambert headlined Europe's largest country music festival, C2C: Country 2 Country, from March 11–13, 2022, marking her first performances in the UK/Europe since her headlining tour there in 2017. She performed two songs from Palomino live for the first time ever at her London show on March 11, her single "If I Was a Cowboy" and "Actin' Up".

=== 2023–present: Label change, Postcards from Texas, and Crisco ===
In March 2023, Lambert announced that she was leaving Sony Music Nashville after nineteen years.

In April 2024, Lambert announced that she had signed a joint deal with Republic Records and Big Loud, with the latter set to handle country radio promotion and marketing. She also announced the first single under the new contract, "Wranglers", which was released on May 3, 2024. It serves as the lead single to her tenth studio album, Postcards from Texas. Promotional single "Dammit Randy" was released on June 28, 2024, a song she co-wrote with her husband, Brendan McLoughlin. The album was released on September 13, 2024.

Lambert co-wrote and sang backing vocals on Ella Langley's 2026 No. 1 Billboard 100 hit, "Choosin' Texas." The song's video, set in a Texas bar, features Lambert as a country performer who takes a heartbroken Langley back to Tennessee. Lambert also co-produced Langley's album Dandelion with her and Ben West, co-wrote and features on the track "Butterfly Season", and provides backing vocals on the track "You & Me Time".

On June 26, 2026, Lambert announced her tenth solo studio album, Crisco, would be released on October 2. The project sees Lambert expanding her sound and combining country music with elements of disco, and includes "A Song to Sing", her 2025 duet with Chris Stapleton.

== Endorsements and business ventures ==
In 2009, Lambert and two other singers became the new faces of Cotton Inc.'s revived "The Touch, The Feel of Cotton" campaign. She has appeared in ads to promote cotton, and the website features a free download of the full version of her song "Fabric of My Life".

Gypsy Rose Blanchard, while under control of her mother who was murdered by her boyfriend in June 2015, would occasionally be given backstage passes and tickets to Lambert's concerts through the Make-A-Wish Foundation, even getting a photograph with both Lambert and her spouse at the time Blake Shelton. In 2013; Lambert donated an estimated $6,000 check to the mother to help with Gypsy's medical needs.

In December 2014, Lambert's line of shoes and boots was released through DSW. In November 2014, Lambert's partnership with Chrysler's Ram trucks was announced. Under the partnership, Ram gave Lambert a customized 1500 Laramie Longhorn that she auctioned off, with proceeds going to Lambert's MuttNation Foundation, a nonprofit that betters the lives of shelter animals.

In May 2021, Lambert became the first female artist to open her own bar in the Lower Broadway entertainment district of downtown Nashville, Tennessee. Named Casa Rosa (Spanish for "Pink House") and opened in partnership with TC Restaurant Group, the 17,400-square-foot Tex-Mex-themed establishment features live music on three of its four stories, plus a rooftop bar, and is decked out in mostly pink decor and various memorabilia from Lambert's career (including the giant birdcage from the "Bluebird" music video). At the bar's opening night party on May 25, 2021, Lambert performed a duet of "Summer Nights" from Grease with her husband Brendan McLoughlin, amidst a star-studded lineup of performances from other country singers.

Lambert also has her own clothing line titled Idyllwind with Boot Barn, a brand of wine with the Red 55 Winery imprint, and owns The Pink Pistol boutique in her hometown of Lindale, Texas.

=== Y’all Eat Yet? Welcome to the Pretty B*tchin’ Kitchen ===
In 2023, Lambert co-authored a cookbook titled Y’all Eat Yet? Welcome to the Pretty B*tchin’ Kitchen with Holly Gleason for Dey Street Books, an imprint of HarperCollins. It includes 50 recipes inspired by "important women in Lambert's life" as well as her native East Texas. In addition to these recipes, the 288-page book contains personal anecdotes alongside photography featuring the farm she shares with husband Brendan McLoughlin.

== MuttNation Foundation ==
In 2009, Lambert opened MuttNation Foundation, with her mother, Bev. The organization focuses on rescue animals and shelters, and Lambert has been vocal about the cause being very close to her heart. The core issues MuttNation works on are:

- Adoption drives – held by Lambert at her concerts, CMA music awards, and the Grand Ole Opry
- Fill the little red wagon – donation drives
- Special circumstances – emergency disaster relief or instances of hoarding
- Cause for the Paws – annual fundraising concerts
- Mutts Across America – provides funds and support to shelters in all 50 US states.
- Ran's Animal Care Express – pet transports
- Mutt March – an annual 5k with proceeds going to MuttNation causes

In 2017, in the wake of Hurricane Harvey's devastation, MuttNation rescued dozens of animals as a part of its emergency/natural disasters objective.

In 2014, Lambert opened Redemption Ranch, a shelter in Tishomingo, Oklahoma, her adopted home town where she lived with Shelton.

To support the foundation, Lambert released a line of pet products in 2019 that are sold inside Tractor Supply Company stores.

In September 2022, MuttNation partnered with Greater Good Charities via the global nonprofit's GOODS Program to provide 2 million pet meals to help families going through economic challenges to stay with their beloved pets.

== Personal life ==
In 2006, Lambert began dating country singer Blake Shelton. They got engaged in May 2010 and were married on May 14, 2011, at the Don Strange Ranch in Boerne, Texas. On July 20, 2015, the couple announced that they were divorcing after four years of marriage.

In December 2015, it was confirmed that Lambert was dating R&B singer Anderson East; they met at Nashville's Live on the Green Music Festival in September of that year. In 2016, Lambert paid $3.4 million for a 400-plus-acre farm, with three residences, near Primm Springs, Tennessee. In April 2018, it was confirmed that Lambert and East had broken up months earlier after two years of dating. Lambert started dating Turnpike Troubadours frontman Evan Felker in February 2018. His estranged wife, Staci, has alleged that he left her suddenly to be with Lambert. They broke up in August 2018.

On February 16, 2019, Lambert announced on social media that she married New York City Police Department officer Brendan McLoughlin on January 26, 2019, in Davidson County, Tennessee.

Lambert has nine tattoos of various objects and symbols, and the word "tumbleweed." In October 2018, she added a queen of hearts tattoo on her forearm.

== Discography ==
Solo

- Kerosene (2005)
- Crazy Ex-Girlfriend (2007)
- Revolution (2009)
- Four the Record (2011)
- Platinum (2014)
- The Weight of These Wings (2016)
- Wildcard (2019)
- Palomino (2022)
- Postcards from Texas (2024)
- Crisco (2026)

with Pistol Annies

- Hell on Heels (2011)
- Annie Up (2013)
- Interstate Gospel (2018)
- Hell of a Holiday (2021)

with Jack Ingram and Jon Randall

- The Marfa Tapes (2021)

== Awards ==
In April 2018, Lambert won the ACM Award for Female Vocalist of the Year for the ninth consecutive year, surpassing Reba McEntire as the most awarded in the category in 2017. In November 2015 she became the first woman to have won the Country Music Association Awards' Album of the Year twice. She has won three Grammy Awards out of 38 nominations. and was the ninth female artist in the show's history to win Entertainer of the Year at the 2022 ACM Awards.

== Tours and residencies ==
=== Tours ===
Headlining

- Roadside Bars & Pink Guitars Tour (2010)
- CMT on Tour: Miranda Lambert Revolution (2010)
- Miranda Lambert: Revolution Tour (2011)
- On Fire Tour (2012)
- Platinum Tour (2014–2016)
  - Certified Platinum Tour (2015)
  - Roadside Bars & Pink Guitars Tour (2015)
- Keeper of the Flame Tour (2016)
- Highway Vagabond Tour (2017)
- Livin' Like Hippies Tour (2018)
- Roadside Bars & Pink Guitars Tour (2019)
- Wildcard Tour (2020)

Co-headlining

- Locked and Loaded Tour with Dierks Bentley (2007)
- Miranda Lambert & Blake Shelton Co-Headlining Tour (2008)
- Locked and Reloaded Tour with Dierks Bentley (2013)
- The Bandwagon Tour with Little Big Town (2018, 2022)
- Rock the Country Tour with Kid Rock and Jason Aldean (2024)

Opening

- Free and Easy Summer Tour with Dierks Bentley (2006)
- Hookin' Up and Hangin' Out Tour with Toby Keith (2007)
- George Strait 2008 Arena Tour (2008)
- Sun City Carnival Tour with Kenny Chesney (2009)
- American Saturday Night Tour with Brad Paisley (2010)
- Virtual Reality Tour with Brad Paisley at Wrigley Field June 9 (2012)
- Night Train Tour with Jason Aldean at Fenway Park July 12 & 13 (2013)
- Spread the Love Tour with Kenny Chesney (2016)

=== Residencies ===
- Velvet Rodeo (2022–2023)

== Filmography ==
| Year | Title | Role | Notes |
|---|---|---|---|
| 2003 | Nashville Star | Contestant | Season one Third Place |
| 2007 | CMT Cross Country | Herself | (with Jack Ingram) |
| 2011 | The Voice | Herself (advisor) | Season 1 Performance Finale with Dia Frampton; Season 2 Battle Advisor From Team Blake; Season 6 Battle Advisor From Team Shakira |
| 2012 | Law & Order: Special Victims Unit | Lacey Ford | Episode: "Father's Shadow" |
