= Four the Record =

Studio album by Miranda Lambert
- Released: November 1, 2011
- Recorded: August–October 2011
- Genre: Country; alternative country
- Length: 53:47
- Label: RCA Nashville
- Producer: Frank Liddell; Chuck Ainlay; Glenn Worf

Miranda Lambert chronology
Revolution (2009)	Four the Record (2011)	Platinum (2014)

Singles from Four the Record
- 1. "Baggage Claim" Released: August 22, 2011; 2. "Over You" Released: January 9, 2012; 3. "Fastest Girl in Town" Released: June 25, 2012; 4. "Mama's Broken Heart" Released: January 14, 2013; 5. "All Kinds of Kinds" Released: June 24, 2013

Four the Record is the fourth studio album by American country music singer and songwriter Miranda Lambert. It was released on November 1, 2011, by RCA Records Nashville. This was her first studio album to be released from that label after a corporate reconstructing at Sony Music Nashville.

The album was a widespread critical success and the highest-charting record of Lambert's career at the time, reaching number three on the Billboard 200. It eventually sold over one million copies in the United States. A deluxe edition of the album was also released, which included a bonus song and a DVD.

== Writing and recording ==
Lambert wrote or co-wrote six of the album's tracks. It was recorded in sessions at Jupiter Studios in Seattle, Sugarhill Recording Studios in Houston, The Cave in Dallas, Wincraft Music Studios in England, and the Nashville-based studios Ronnie's Place, Sound Stage Studios, and Tragedy/Tragedy Studios.

== Release and promotion ==
Lambert announced in July 2011 that Four the Record would be released on November 1, 2011. A month later, Sony Music Nashville announced that Lambert and labelmate Josh Thompson would transfer to RCA Nashville as part of a corporate restructuring.

In the first week of release, the album sold 133,000 copies in the United States and debuted at number three on the Billboard 200, making it the highest-charting album of Lambert's career at that time. It also debuted at number one on the Billboard Top Country Albums. The album was certified platinum by the Recording Industry Association of America on January 10, 2014, and by September of that year, it had sold 1,014,000 copies in the US.

== Critical reception ==
Professional ratings
Aggregate scores
Source	Rating
Metacritic	83/100
Review scores
Source	Rating
AllMusic	4.5/5 stars
American Songwriter	4.5/5 stars
The A.V. Club	B+
Entertainment Weekly	A−
Los Angeles Times	3/4 stars
MSN Music (Expert Witness)	A−
PopMatters	6/10
Rolling Stone	3.5/5 stars
Slant Magazine	3.5/5 stars
Spin	7/10

Four the Record was met with widespread critical acclaim. At Metacritic, which assigns a normalized rating out of 100 to reviews from mainstream publications, the album received an average score of 83, based on 12 reviews. Stephen Thomas Erlewine from AllMusic believed Lambert was able to expand stylistically by relying more on other songwriters for the record: "She's digging deeper than ever before and finding considerable riches." In Country Weekly, Ken Tucker deemed it her best album so far and hailed Lambert as a matured "interpreter of songs, whether she's written them or not", while Genevieve Koski from The A.V. Club felt it showcased some of her most intriguing songs yet, proving "her willingness to color outside the lines of country-music convention goes beyond lyrical statements of bad-assitude." Entertainment Weekly critic Mikael Wood said she explored a variety of human emotions and moods on the record, which he called her "most vivid effort yet, with brilliantly observed songs about lust ('Fine Tune') and disappointment ('Same Old You'), as well as a stirring celebration of diversity ('All Kinds of Kinds')."

Some reviewers were less enthusiastic. Writing for MSN Music, Robert Christgau called Four the Record a "basic quality country album" highlighted by the harder opening songs before delving into trite ballads catering to the housewife demographic, such as "Dear Diamond", "Oklahoma Sky", and "Better in the Long Run". Spin magazine's Theon Weber lamented most of the lyrics, which he found "flat, even when they're Lambert's", while Jon Caramanica of The New York Times viewed it as a foray into alternative country featuring some of her least inspired singing and songwriting.

== Track listing ==
No.	Title	Writer(s)	Length
1.	"All Kinds of Kinds"	Phillip Coleman, Don Henry	4:26
2.	"Fine Tune"	Natalie Hemby, Luke Laird	4:39
3.	"Fastest Girl in Town"	Miranda Lambert, Angaleena Presley	3:17
4.	"Safe"	Lambert	4:46
5.	"Mama's Broken Heart"	Brandy Clark, Shane McAnally, Kacey Musgraves	2:59
6.	"Dear Diamond" (with Patty Loveless)	Lambert	3:49
7.	"Same Old You"	Brandi Carlile	3:05
8.	"Baggage Claim"	Lambert, Hemby, Laird	3:18
9.	"Easy Living"	Lambert, Scott Wray	2:45
10.	"Over You"	Lambert, Blake Shelton	4:13
11.	"Look at Miss Ohio"	David Rawlings, Gillian Welch	4:18
12.	"Better in the Long Run" (with Blake Shelton)	Charles Kelley, Ashley Monroe, Gordie Sampson	3:34
13.	"Nobody's Fool"	Chris Stapleton	3:43
14.	"Oklahoma Sky"	Allison Moorer	4:46

Deluxe Edition
No.	Title	Writer(s)	Length
15.	"Hurts to Think" (Bonus Track)	Lambert, Hemby, Jessica Bendinger	2:55

== Personnel ==
Credits are adapted from AllMusic.

=== Musicians ===
- Richard Bennett – guitar, bouzouki (13)
- Sarah Buxton – background vocals (tracks 4, 10)
- Brandi Carlile – background vocals (7)
- Matt Chamberlain – drums, percussion
- Glen Duncan – background vocals (2)
- Karen Fairchild – background vocals (11)
- Don Henry – background vocals (1)
- John Barlow Jarvis – piano
- Jay Joyce – guitar, clavinet (8), acoustic slide guitar (8), pump organ (1)
- Josh Kelley – background vocals (8)
- Miranda Lambert – lead vocals
- Greg Leisz – Dobro, steel guitar
- Betsey Long – background vocals (3)
- Patty Loveless – background vocals (6)
- Allison Moorer – background vocals (14)
- Gordon Mote – background vocals (2)
- Kacey Musgraves – background vocals (5)
- Stoney LaRue – background vocals (1)
- Kimberly Schlapman – background vocals (11)
- Randy Scruggs – banjo, guitar, mandolin, background vocals (2, 9)
- Blake Shelton – duet vocals (12)
- Chris Stapleton – background vocals (13)
- Scotty Wray – background vocals (9)
- Steve Winwood – Hammond B-3 organ (8)
- Glenn Worf – bass guitar, upright bass, picked piano (6), background vocals (2)

=== Production ===
- Chuck Ainlay – engineering, mixing, producer
- Enzo Angileri – hair stylist
- Judy Forde-Blair – creative producer, liner notes
- Steven Christensen – vocal recording
- Tammie Harris Cleek – imaging, photo production
- Martin Feveyear – vocal recording
- Tracy Baskette-Fleaner – creative director, design
- Tiffany Gifford – stylist
- Emory Gordy Jr. – vocal recording
- Brittany Hamlin – production coordination
- Ryan Krieg – assistant engineer, mixing assistant
- Frank Liddell – producer
- Stephen Marcussen – mastering
- Mylah Morales – make-up
- Randee St. Nicholas – photography
- Lisa Ramsey-Perkins – A&R
- Brandon Schexnayder – assistant engineer, mixing assistant
- James Towler – engineering
- Stewart Whitmore – digital editing
- Glenn Worf – producer

== Charts ==
=== Weekly charts ===
Chart (2011)	Peak position
Australian Country Albums Chart	11
Canadian Albums Chart	12
UK Country Albums Chart	5
US Billboard 200	3
US Billboard Top Country Albums	1

=== Year-end charts ===
Chart (2011)	Position
US Billboard 200	172
US Top Country Albums (Billboard)	40

Chart (2012)	Position
US Billboard 200	47
US Billboard Country Albums	14
Chart (2013)	Position
US Billboard 200	97
US Top Country Albums (Billboard)	24

== Certifications ==
Region	Certification	Certified units/sales
United States (RIAA)	Platinum	1,000,000^{^}
^{^} Shipments figures based on certification alone.
