= Mama's Broken Heart =

2013 single by Miranda Lambert

Single by Miranda Lambert

from the album Four the Record
- Released: January 14, 2013
- Recorded: 2011
- Genre: Country
- Length: 2:57
- Label: RCA Nashville
- Songwriters: Brandy Clark; Shane McAnally; Kacey Musgraves
- Producers: Frank Liddell; Glenn Worf; Chuck Ainlay

Miranda Lambert singles chronology
"Fastest Girl in Town" (2012)	"Mama's Broken Heart" (2013)	"All Kinds of Kinds" (2013)

Music videos
- "Mama's Broken Heart" on YouTube

"Mama's Broken Heart" is a song recorded by American country music artist Miranda Lambert. It was released on January 14, 2013 as the fourth single from Lambert's album, Four the Record (2011). "Mama's Broken Heart" was written by Brandy Clark, Shane McAnally, and Kacey Musgraves, and is about a woman losing control after a break-up and ignoring her mother's advice on dealing with such a situation.

The song garnered a positive reception from critics who praised the production and Lambert's delivery of the lyrics. "Mama's Broken Heart" peaked at number 2 on both the Billboard Country Airplay and Hot Country Songs charts respectively. It also charted at number 20 on the Hot 100, her fourth top 40 hit on that chart. The song was certified Platinum by the Recording Industry Association of America and has sold 1,960,000 copies in the United States as of September 2015. It achieved similar chart success in Canada, peaking at number one on the Country chart and number 30 on the Canadian Hot 100.

The accompanying music video for the song was directed by Trey Fanjoy.

== Content ==
"Mama's Broken Heart" is a moderate uptempo song in the key of E minor written by Brandy Clark, Shane McAnally, and Kacey Musgraves. The song's female narrator acts out as she struggles with a break-up, which leads people to begin taking notice of her behavior ("Word got around to the barflies and the Baptists"). When her mother finds out, she responds by scolding her daughter and telling her to regain her composure ("Run and hide your crazy and start actin’ like a lady"). The second verse states that the narrator sacrifices her "spotless reputation" in favor of "revenge," which is in contrast with the way her mother's generation handled such situations ("Where you get a grip and bite your lip just to save a little face"), but ultimately she takes matters into her own hands because "[it isn't her] mama's broken heart."

Lambert, in an interview with Taste of Country, said that "Mama's Broken Heart" was the one song on Four the Record she couldn't live without, and that she can relate to the character in the song: "I think we all have at some point or another. Mostly when we’re young. Especially crazy teenage love — you think the world is ending if you break up." She expressed that when she first heard it, "she knew it was special" and wished she had been the one to write it.

Musgraves, who grew up with Lambert, was reluctant to give her old friend the song, who was pitched it without Musgraves' consent. At her wedding, Lambert asked if Musgraves was going to record the song or if she could have it. Lambert said she had to "actually beg for this song." Musgraves gave it to her on the stipulation that she could sing background vocals, which she did. Tensions lingered between the two singers over the song, which Musgraves said she resolved when bringing Lambert into the collaborative process on her 2026 album, Middle of Nowhere.

== Critical reception ==
The song received favorable reviews from critics. Ben Foster of Country Universe praised the track, referring favorably to its "deceptively deep" lyrics, Lambert's delivery, and an "engaging [and] off-beat arrangement." Foster rated the song an A, and dubbed it Lambert's best single since 2010's "The House That Built Me." Taste of Country's Billy Dukes awarded the song 4 and 1/2 stars out of 5, comparing it favorably to Lambert's previous hits "Kerosene" and "Gunpowder & Lead" and favorably commenting on the sparse yet suspenseful nature of the production.

== Commercial performance ==
"Mama's Broken Heart" debuted at number 54 on the U.S. Billboard Country Airplay chart for the week ending January 5, 2013, and debuted at number 46 on the U.S. Billboard Hot Country Songs chart for the week ending January 12, 2013. It also debuted at number 89 on the U.S. Billboard Hot 100 chart for the week of February 9, 2013, and at number 76 on the Canadian Hot 100 chart for the week of February 9, 2013. The song became Lambert's highest-peaking single on the Billboard Hot 100, reaching number 20 until 2014's "Somethin' Bad" made it her second highest-peaking single on that chart.

The song has sold 1,960,000 copies in the US as of September 2015.

== Music video ==
The music video was directed by Trey Fanjoy and premiered in March 2013.

== Charts ==
=== Weekly charts ===
Chart (2013)	Peak position
Canada Hot 100 (Billboard)	30
Canada Country (Billboard)	1
US Billboard Hot 100	20
US Country Airplay (Billboard)	2
US Hot Country Songs (Billboard)	2

=== Year-end charts ===
Chart (2013)	Position
US Billboard Hot 100	89
US Country Airplay (Billboard)	31
US Hot Country Songs (Billboard)	8

== Certifications ==
Region	Certification	Certified units/sales
United States (RIAA)	3× Platinum	3,000,000^{‡}
^{‡} Sales+streaming figures based on certification alone.
