= Somethin' Bad =

Single by Miranda Lambert and Carrie Underwood

from the album Platinum
- Released: May 19, 2014
- Studio: St. Charles Studio (Nashville, TN)
- Genre: Country rock
- Length: 2:49
- Label: RCA Nashville; Arista Nashville
- Songwriters: Chris DeStefano; Brett James; Priscilla Renea
- Producers: Frank Liddell; Chuck Ainlay; Glenn Worf

Miranda Lambert singles chronology
"Automatic" (2014)	"Somethin' Bad" (2014)	"Little Red Wagon" (2015)

Carrie Underwood singles chronology
"See You Again" (2013)	"Somethin' Bad" (2014)	"Something in the Water" (2014)

Music video
- "Somethin' Bad" on YouTube

"Somethin' Bad" is a song recorded as a duet by American country music artists Miranda Lambert and Carrie Underwood. The song was written by Chris DeStefano, Brett James and Priscilla Renea. It was released as the second single from Lambert's fifth studio album Platinum in advance of the album's release two weeks later. The song premiered at the 2014 Billboard Music Awards on May 18, 2014, and was released for sale the next day.

"Somethin' Bad" peaked at number one on the Billboard Hot Country Songs, becoming Underwood's thirteenth number one on the chart and Lambert's fifth. The song is the first number one by teamed-up solo women in more than two decades on this chart.

On December 5, 2014, the collaboration received a Grammy nomination for Best Country Duo/Group Performance.

== Background ==
The song was written by Chris DeStefano and Brett James along with Priscilla Renea while they were at a writing retreat in France for ASCAP. The song was originally intended to be a male/female duet, but was later tweaked so that it could be performed by two females.

According to Lambert, when she heard "Somethin’ Bad", "the song just popped," and it "really struck a chord." Lambert said she had wanted to do a duet with Carrie Underwood, and that "It's been too long since two girls in our genre have come together like that, especially on a song that's kind of in your face." She sent Underwood an email to request a collaboration, which was accepted as they had wanted to sing together for some time. Lyrically, the song is about the two women bar-hopping in New Orleans, Louisiana. It has been described as being inspired by Thelma & Louise, and as a female equivalent of bro-country. It is composed in the key of E minor with an approximate tempo of 88 beats per minute.

The song made its debut on the 2014 Billboard Music Awards on May 18, 2014 with a performance by Lambert and Underwood. They performed the song again at the CMT Music Awards on June 4, 2014.

== Critical reception ==
The song received generally favorable response from the critics. Matt Bjorke of Roughstock thought the song playful, fun, and "sure to be a fast-selling hit." Jason Scott of AXS called it "a fun, beat-driven summer anthem" and rated it four stars out of five. Taste of Country said that the song's "ready-for-anything lyrics and the way that Lambert and Underwood belt them out with such power, make ‘Somethin’ Bad’ a catchy girl-power anthem."

== Commercial performance ==
"Somethin' Bad" debuted at No. 39 on the U.S. Billboard Hot 100 chart and at No. 5 on the Billboard Hot Country Songs chart following its release for sales on May 19, 2014 (chart dated June 7, 2014). The song debuted at No. 48 on the Billboard Country Airplay chart for the same week, before it was officially released to radio on June 16, 2014. The song also debuted at No. 1 on the Billboard Country Digital Songs chart, with 107,000 downloads sold in its first week. "Somethin' Bad" peaked at No. 1 on the Billboard Hot Country Songs in its sixth week, becoming Underwood's 13th number one on the chart and Lambert's fifth. The same week, the song jumped to No. 19 on the Billboard Hot 100, becoming Lambert's highest peaking song to date on that chart. It is the first No. 1 by teamed-up solo women in more than two decades on the Billboard Hot Country Songs chart. As of April 2015, the song has sold 1,080,000 copies in the United States.

In Canada, the song debuted at No. 33 on the Canadian Hot 100 chart following its first week of release.

== Music video ==
The music video was directed by Trey Fanjoy and released on June 25, 2014. It features Lambert as Belle Boyd and Underwood as Priscilla Parker, a pair of jewel thieves. The video is presented as a trailer for a film where the pair play poker, ride Indian motorcycles and engage in a jewel heist in which they flee in a luxury Bell Helicopter.

Miranda purchased the two Indian Motorcycles keeping one for herself, while giving the other to Carrie as a "thank you" for doing the song with her. Carrie tweeted a pic of her on the bike. The bikes and the helicopter were part of a product placement arrangement organized by CMS Nashville.

As of November 2019, the music video has accumulated over 109 million views on Vevo and was nominated for a 2014 CMA for "Video of the Year."

== Sunday Night Football 2016 theme ==
In June 2016, NBC Sports announced that "Somethin' Bad" would form the basis of Underwood's new theme for NBC Sunday Night Football starting with the 2016 NFL season. Titled "Oh, Sunday Night", it replaced "Waiting All Day for Sunday Night", itself inspired by an existing song (Joan Jett's "I Hate Myself for Loving You").

== Awards and nominations ==
=== Academy of Country Music Awards ===
Year	Nominee / work	Award	Result
2015	"Somethin' Bad"	Video of the Year	Nominated
2015	"Somethin' Bad"	Vocal Event of the Year	Nominated

=== CMT Music Awards ===
Year	Nominee / work	Award	Result
2015	"Somethin' Bad"	Video of the Year	Nominated
2015	"Somethin' Bad"	Collaborative Video of the Year	Won

=== Country Music Association Awards ===
Year	Nominee / work	Award	Result
2014	"Somethin' Bad"	Musical Event of the Year	Nominated
2014	"Somethin' Bad"	Music Video of the Year	Nominated

=== Grammy Awards ===
Year	Nominee / work	Award	Result
2015	"Somethin' Bad"	Best Country Duo/Group Performance	Nominated

=== Teen Choice Awards ===
Year	Nominee / work	Award	Result
2014	"Somethin' Bad"	Choice Country Song	Nominated

== Charts and certifications ==
=== Weekly charts ===
Chart (2014)	Peak position
Canada Hot 100 (Billboard)	33
Canada Country (Billboard)	6
Slovakia Singles Digital (ČNS IFPI)	91
US Billboard Hot 100	19
US Country Airplay (Billboard)	7
US Hot Country Songs (Billboard)	1

=== Year-end charts ===
Chart (2014)	Position
US Billboard Hot 100	99
US Country Airplay (Billboard)	47
US Hot Country Songs (Billboard)	10

== Certifications ==
Region	Certification	Certified units/sales
United States (RIAA)	2× Platinum	2,000,000^{‡}
^{‡} Sales+streaming figures based on certification alone.
