= Baggage Claim =

Single by Miranda Lambert

from the album Four the Record
- Released: 22 August 2011
- Recorded: 2011
- Genre: Country
- Length: 3:18
- Label: Columbia Nashville; RCA Nashville
- Songwriters: Natalie Hemby; Luke Laird; Miranda Lambert
- Producers: Frank Liddell; Glenn Worf

Miranda Lambert singles chronology
"Heart Like Mine" (2011)	"Baggage Claim" (2011)	"Over You" (2012)

"Baggage Claim" is a song co-written and recorded by American country music artist Miranda Lambert. It was released in August 2011 as the lead single from her album Four the Record. It was written by Lambert, with Natalie Hemby and Luke Laird.

== Content ==
Its lyric is a play on the term "emotional baggage," comparing them to the baggage that an unfaithful man is picking up at an airport baggage claim.

The song features a backing vocal from Josh Kelley.

== Critical reception ==
The song received mixed reviews from music critics. Bobby Peacock of Roughstock gave the song 4½ stars out of 5, calling it "an exercise in attitude done right." He praised the song's production and the "clever use of emotional "baggage" as a play on words for the baggage that her man's being sent off with." Billy Dukes of Taste of Country gave it 2 out of 5 stars, finding fault in the song's use of baggage claim as a metaphor and unfavorably comparing the song to something Carrie Underwood might record.

== Music video ==
A live performance of "Baggage Claim" on the 2011 CMA Awards on 9 November 2011 served as the song's music video.

== Chart performance ==
"Baggage Claim" debuted at number 33 on the U.S. Billboard Hot Country Songs chart for the week ending 20 August 2011. It also debuted at number 67 on the U.S. Billboard Hot 100 chart for the week of 27 August 2011, and at number 92 on the Canadian Hot 100 chart for the week of 8 October 2011.

Chart (2011–2012)	Peak position
US Hot Country Songs (Billboard)	3
US Billboard Hot 100	44
Canada Hot 100 (Billboard)	74

=== Year-end charts ===
Chart (2011)	Position
US Country Songs (Billboard)	45

Chart (2012)	Position
US Country Songs (Billboard)	81
