= Heart Like Mine =

Single by Miranda Lambert

from the album Revolution
- Released: January 10, 2011
- Recorded: 2009
- Genre: Country
- Length: 2:57
- Label: Columbia Nashville
- Songwriters: Travis Howard; Miranda Lambert; Ashley Monroe
- Producers: Frank Liddell; Mike Wrucke

Miranda Lambert singles chronology
"Coal Miner's Daughter" (2010)	"Heart Like Mine" (2011)	"Baggage Claim" (2011)

Music video
- "Heart Like Mine" on YouTube

"Heart Like Mine" is a song co-written and recorded by American country music artist Miranda Lambert. It was released in January 2011 as the fifth and final single from her 2009 album Revolution. Lambert co-wrote this song with Ashley Monroe and Travis Howard.

The song garnered positive reviews from critics who praised its catchability and Lambert's lyrics. "Heart Like Mine" gave Lambert her second number one hit on the Billboard Hot Country Songs chart. It also charted on the Hot 100 at number 44. The song was certified Gold by the Recording Industry Association of America (RIAA), denoting sales of over half-a-million units in the country. The song also charted in Canada, peaking at number 69 on the Canadian Hot 100.

The accompanying music video for the song, directed by Justin Luffman, is an acoustic performance taken from Lambert's Revolution: Live by Candlelight DVD.

== Content ==
"Heart Like Mine" is an uptempo country in the key of A♭ major song backed primarily by electric guitar, banjo, and steel guitar. The song's female narrator describes being a little rough around the edges ("I ain’t the kind you take home to mama / I ain’t the kind to wear no ring"). However she ignores the criticism of her family and peers, stating that Jesus would understand a "heart like [hers]."

== Critical reception ==
The song received positive reviews from music critics. C.M. Wilcox of The 9513 gave the song a thumbs up, referring to the single as a safe choice for radio, but favorably describing the lyrics as "uniquely Miranda." Kyle Ward of Roughstock gave the song four-and-a-half stars out of five, complimenting its "exceptionally strong melody" that works well with the song's production. He concluded that the song is a "catchy number [...] made for radio."

== Music video ==
The music video, directed by Justin Luffman, premiered on CMT on January 21, 2011. The video is an acoustic performance of the song, taken from Lambert's Revolution: Live by Candlelight DVD. It also features David Foster

== Charts ==
"Heart Like Mine" debuted at number 58 on the U.S. Billboard Hot Country Songs chart for the week ending January 8, 2011. It also debuted at number 95 on the U.S. Billboard Hot 100 chart for the week of February 26, 2011, and at number 95 on the Canadian Hot 100 chart for the week of April 2, 2011. The song became Lambert's second Number One hit on the Hot Country Songs chart for the week dated May 28, 2011.

=== Weekly charts ===
Chart (2011)	Peak position
Canada Hot 100 (Billboard)	69
Canada Country (Billboard)	2
US Billboard Hot 100	44
US Hot Country Songs (Billboard)	1

=== Year-end charts ===
Chart (2011)	Peak position
US Hot Country Songs (Billboard)	17

=== Decade-end charts ===
Chart (2010–2019)	Position
US Hot Country Songs (Billboard)	50

== Certifications ==
Region	Certification	Certified units/sales
United States (RIAA)	Platinum	1,000,000^{‡}
^{‡} Sales+streaming figures based on certification alone.

== Release history ==
Region	Date	Format	Label	Ref.
United States	January 10, 2011	Country radio	Columbia Nashville	
