= All Kinds of Kinds =

Single by Miranda Lambert

from the album Four the Record
- Released: June 24, 2013
- Recorded: 2011
- Genre: Country
- Length: 4:26
- Label: RCA Nashville
- Songwriters: Phillip Coleman; Don Henry
- Producers: Frank Liddell; Glenn Worf; Chuck Ainlay

Miranda Lambert singles chronology
"Mama's Broken Heart" (2013)	"All Kinds of Kinds" (2013)	"We Were Us" (2013)

Music videos
- "All Kinds of Kinds" on YouTube

"All Kinds of Kinds" is a song recorded by American country music artist Miranda Lambert. It was released in June 2013 as the fifth and final single from Lambert's album Four the Record. As of October 9, 2013, the single had sold 100,000 copies in the United States. It was written by Phillip Coleman and Don Henry.

== Content ==
"All Kinds of Kinds" is a mid-tempo country song in which the lyrics state that "ever since the beginning, to keep the world spinning, it takes all kinds of kinds." The lyrics refer to different characters such as "a dog-faced boy, a cross-dressing congressman and a can't-help-herself pharmacist," and a final verse addressing the narrator herself. It features a backing vocal from Stoney LaRue. It is in the key of C major and a 3/4 time signature, with a main chord pattern of C-F/C-C-G/C-C.

== Critical reception ==
The song received acclaim from music critics. Taste of Country's Billy Dukes praised the song, giving it five-out-of-five stars and calling it an album highlight. He called the release "daring" because the content "is as far from country Main Street as you can get." However, Dukes spoke favorably of the song's "meaningful and impacting message" and its difference in sound. Giving it an "A", Jon Freeman of Country Weekly said that "it's a wacky menagerie, but… it's also a very timely message considering how beset we are with terrible news of bullying and intolerance at this point in history." He praised Lambert's vocals, and described the song as a "jubilant waltz".

== Music video ==
The music video was directed by Bluford Sanders and premiered in August 2013. It features live footage of Miranda Lambert performing the song mixed with scenes of various people holding up whiteboards on which they have written messages as to what kind of person they are.

== Chart performance ==
"All Kinds of Kinds" debuted at number 57 on the U.S. Billboard Country Airplay chart for the week ending July 6, 2013. It also debuted at number 47 on the U.S. Billboard Hot Country Songs chart for the week ending August 3, 2013. It also debuted at number 97 on the U.S. Billboard Hot 100 chart for the week of October 26, 2013. It also debuted at number 94 on the Canadian Hot 100 chart for the week of November 30, 2013. As of November 13, 2013, "All Kinds of Kinds" has sold 160,000 copies in the United States.

Chart (2013)	Peak position
Canada Hot 100 (Billboard)	94
Canada Country (Billboard)	12
US Billboard Hot 100	89
US Country Airplay (Billboard)	15
US Hot Country Songs (Billboard)	24

=== Year-end charts ===
Chart (2013)	Position
US Country Airplay (Billboard)	67
US Hot Country Songs (Billboard)	73
