= Automatic (Miranda Lambert song) =

Single by Miranda Lambert

from the album Platinum
- Released: February 17, 2014
- Genre: Country
- Length: 4:07
- Label: RCA Nashville
- Songwriters: Nicolle Galyon; Natalie Hemby; Miranda Lambert
- Producers: Frank Liddell; Glenn Worf

Miranda Lambert singles chronology
"We Were Us" (2013)	"Automatic" (2014)	"Somethin' Bad" (2014)

Music videos
- "Automatic" on YouTube

"Automatic" is a song co-written and recorded by American country music artist Miranda Lambert. It was released in February 2014 and served as the lead single from her fifth studio album, Platinum. Lambert co-wrote the song with Nicolle Galyon and Natalie Hemby. It was nominated for two Grammy Awards for Best Country Solo Performance and Best Country Song.

== Content ==
"Automatic" is a mid-tempo country song that is built around lyrics of nostalgia and remembering the days "back before everything became automatic." Written by Lambert along with Nicolle Galyon and Natalie Hemby, the lyrics reference such things as pocket watches, payphones, radios, and sending letters in the mail as examples of everyday things that have since been phased out by newer technology.

Lambert said that the song is "about slowing down, taking a breath and remembering what it's like to live life a little more simply. It's not about going back, but reminiscing about what it was like to hang laundry on the line and wait for it to dry and my dad teaching me how to drive my '55 Chevy that I still have but don't drive nearly enough. The song brings back good memories and it reminds me to take a deep breath and to remember that getting there is half the fun."

Canadian country artist Carolyn Dawn Johnson provides harmony vocals on the song.

== Music video ==
The music video was directed by Trey Fanjoy and premiered on March 24, 2014. In it, Lambert is shown going through a trunk in her attic full of keepsakes, pulling out things such as old letters and photographs, jewelry, and a cassette player. Meanwhile, Lambert is seen performing the song with her acoustic guitar on a porch and driving around the countryside in her '55 Chevy, taking in the rural landscape.

At the 2014 CMT Music Awards, Lambert's song "Automatic" won Female Video of the Year, giving Lambert her fifth consecutive win in the category.

== Awards and nominations ==
=== Academy of Country Music Awards ===
Year	Nominee / work	Award	Result
2015	"Automatic"	Song of the Year	Won
2015	"Automatic"	Single of the Year	Nominated

=== Country Music Association Awards ===
Year	Nominee / work	Award	Result
2014	"Automatic"	Song of the Year	Nominated
2014	"Automatic"	Single of the Year	Won
2014	"Automatic"	Music Video of the Year	Nominated

=== CMT Music Awards ===
Year	Nominee / work	Award	Result
2014	"Automatic"	Video of the Year	Nominated
2014	"Automatic"	Female Video of the Year	Won

=== Grammy Awards ===
Year	Nominee / work	Award	Result
2015	"Automatic"	Best Country Solo Performance	Nominated
2015	"Automatic"	Best Country Song	Nominated

== Chart performance ==
"Automatic" debuted at number 26 on the U.S. Billboard Country Airplay chart for the chart dated February 22, 2014, making it Lambert's highest-debuting single at that time. The song has sold 473,000 copies in the U.S. as of June 2014.

Chart (2014)	Peak position
Canada Hot 100 (Billboard)	34
Canada Country (Billboard)	1
US Billboard Hot 100	35
US Country Airplay (Billboard)	3
US Hot Country Songs (Billboard)	4

=== Year-end charts ===
Chart (2014)	Position
US Country Airplay (Billboard)	14
US Hot Country Songs (Billboard)	29

== Certifications ==
Region	Certification	Certified units/sales
United States (RIAA)	Gold	500,000^{‡}
^{‡} Sales+streaming figures based on certification alone.
