= Fastest Girl in Town =

Single by Miranda Lambert

from the album Four the Record
- Released: June 25, 2012
- Recorded: 2011
- Genre: Country; country rock
- Length: 3:17
- Label: RCA Nashville
- Songwriters: Miranda Lambert; Angaleena Presley
- Producers: Frank Liddell; Glenn Worf

Miranda Lambert singles chronology
"Over You" (2012)	"Fastest Girl in Town" (2012)	"Mama's Broken Heart" (2013)

Music videos
- "Fastest Girl in Town" on YouTube

"Fastest Girl in Town" is a song co-written and recorded by American country music artist Miranda Lambert. It was released in June 2012 as the third single from Lambert's album Four the Record. The song was written by Lambert and Angaleena Presley.

== Content ==
"Fastest Girl in Town" is a moderate up-tempo song written by Miranda Lambert and Angaleena Presley. The song's female narrator details the relationship she has with her love interest as being edgy and dangerous ("You got the bullets / I got the gun / I got the hankerin' for gettin' into something") and portrays them as two rebels on the run ("I hit the bottle / You hit the gas / I heard your '65 can really haul some ass"). In the final verse, the protagonist makes mention of seeing police lights and admits that if they are pulled over, she will charm the officer while her boyfriend takes the heat for whatever crimes they've committed together, chiding her man with declarations that she is crazy and cannot be slowed down, because "[he's] running with the fastest girl in town."

=== Composition ===
The song is written in the key of F-sharp Mixolydian.

== Critical reception ==
Country music critics were divided in their opinions of the song. Taste of Country's Billy Dukes gave the song 5 out of 5 stars, comparing it to Lambert's own attitude-driven hits "Kerosene" and "Gunpowder & Lead," while complimenting the song's sound and the unique structure of "four verses, two furious guitar solos and no real bridge." In contrast, Kevin John Coyne of Country Universe gave the song an F, criticizing the song for having "lazy songwriting" and saying that "It's one of those rare songs that manages to try too hard and be too lazy at the same time." Similarly, Country Music Review gave the song a 3/10, saying that Lambert's "veering dangerously close to self-parody."

== Music video ==
The music video for "Fastest Girl in Town" was shot in late June 2012, and features a guest appearance by NASCAR driver Danica Patrick.

The music video reached number 1 on CMT's Top Twenty Countdown for the week of December 7, 2012.

== Chart performance ==
"Fastest Girl in Town" debuted at number 54 on the U.S. Billboard Hot Country Songs chart for the week ending June 2, 2012, several weeks before the single was officially released.

Chart (2012)	Peak position
Canada Hot 100 (Billboard)	72
US Billboard Hot 100	47
US Country Airplay (Billboard)	3
US Hot Country Songs (Billboard)	7

=== Year-end charts ===
Chart (2012)	Position
US Country Songs (Billboard)	28

== Certifications ==
Region	Certification	Certified units/sales
United States (RIAA)	Gold	500,000^{^}
^{^} Shipments figures based on certification alone.
