= Over You (Miranda Lambert song) =

2012 song by Miranda Lambert

Single by Miranda Lambert

from the album Four the Record
- Released: January 9, 2012
- Recorded: 2011
- Genre: Country
- Length: 4:13 (album version); 3:42 (radio edit)
- Label: RCA Nashville
- Songwriters: Miranda Lambert; Blake Shelton
- Producers: Frank Liddell; Glenn Worf

Miranda Lambert singles chronology
"Baggage Claim" (2011)	"Over You" (2012)	"Fastest Girl in Town" (2012)

Music videos
- "Over You" on YouTube

"Over You" is a song co-written and recorded by American country music artist Miranda Lambert. It was released in January 2012 as the second single from Lambert's album Four the Record.

Lambert performed the song at the 2012 Academy of Country Music Awards on April 1, 2012. On November 1, 2012, Lambert and Blake Shelton won the CMA Award for Song of the Year for "Over You"; in addition, on April 7, 2013, they also won the ACM Award for Song of the Year for "Over You".

== Content ==
"Over You" is a country ballad written by Lambert and her then-husband Blake Shelton about a personal experience Shelton had as a teenager when his older brother was killed in a car accident. According to Lambert, she decided to record the song because of Shelton's emotional connection to the song: "Blake said he couldn’t record it for himself or sing it onstage every night, but he would be honored for me to."

== Critical reception ==
The song received mixed reviews from music critics. Kyle Ward of Roughstock gave the song 4½ stars out of 5, favorably describing the song as having "a raw account of pain and emotions. The production and melody of the song is solemn, and Miranda does a great job, giving a very pretty, controlled rendering of the song. She really sets the tone, right from the opening line." Ben Foster of Country Universe gave the song a D+ and described it as being a "really boring song [...] clogged up with superficial cliché phrasing and awkward juvenile rhyme schemes set to a clunky, uninspired melody." Billboard and Paste ranked the song number two and number three, respectively, on their lists of the 10 greatest Miranda Lambert songs.

== Music video ==
The music video for "Over You" was directed by Trey Fanjoy and shot between January 30, 2012, and February 2, 2012, and premiered on March 1, 2012. The video shows Lambert walking through a wooded area during a light snow, before coming to a set of gravestones, where she proceeds to grieve over the loss of her loved one. Before turning to leave, she places a watch on the grave. Throughout the video, scenes of a white horse running among the trees are also included, as well as two small children playing, one of whom eventually disappears.

== Chart and sales performance ==
"Over You" debuted at number 52 on the U.S. Billboard Hot Country Songs chart for the week ending January 7, 2012. It also debuted at number 93 on the U.S. Billboard Hot 100 chart in November 2011 (prior to its release as an official single), and debuted at number 84 on Canadian Hot 100 chart for the week of March 17, 2012. It has sold 1,338,000 copies in the US as of June 2013.

Chart (2012)	Peak position
Canada Hot 100 (Billboard)	52
Canada Country (Billboard)	1
US Billboard Hot 100	35
US Hot Country Songs (Billboard)	1

=== Year-end charts ===
Chart (2012)	Position
US Country Songs (Billboard)	15

=== Certifications ===
Region	Certification	Certified units/sales
United States (RIAA)	2× Platinum	1,338,000

== Cassadee Pope version ==
"Over You"

Single by Cassadee Pope
- Released: 19 November 2012
- Recorded: 2012
- Genre: Pop rock; country pop
- Length: 3:36
- Label: Universal
- Songwriters: Blake Shelton; Miranda Lambert

In November 2012, Cassadee Pope, contestant and eventual winner of the third season of The Voice, covered the song during the live top 10 performances segment of the show. As part of the show, she was coached through the duration of the show by Blake Shelton, the co-writer of the song.

Pope's version sold 152,000 copies in its debut week, beating Javier Colon's record of 145,000 unit sales for his winner's single "Stitch by Stitch", making it the highest-selling single of the series. It debuted at number 25 on the Billboard Hot 100, and number 3 on the Hot Digital Songs charts. It has sold a total of 277,000 copies in its first five weeks (the duration of the show). The song was later performed again on the final performances of the series on December 17.

Chart (2012)	Peak position
Canada (Canadian Hot 100)	15
US Billboard Hot 100	25
US Country Songs (Billboard)	3
