= Miranda Lambert discography =

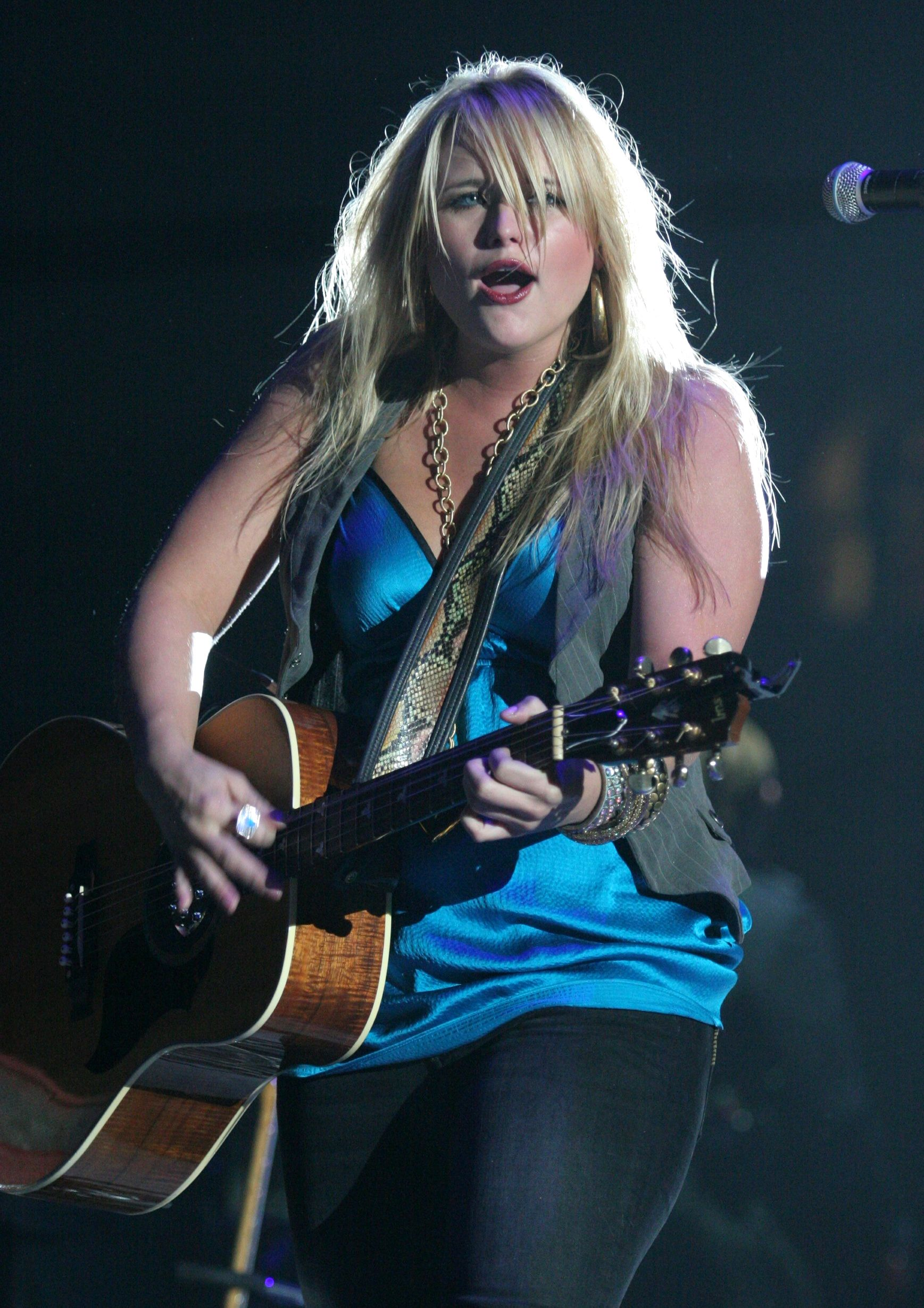
- Lambert in 2008
- Studio albums: 12
- Extended plays: 1
- Singles: 41
- Video albums: 1
- Music videos: 37
- Other appearances: 23
- Promotional singles: 9
- #1 singles: 10
- Other charted songs: 5

American country music singer Miranda Lambert has released eleven studio albums, one extended play, one video album, and has made 23 other album appearances. She has released 39 singles (including seven as a featured artist), nine promotional singles, and 37 music videos (including five guest appearances). Lambert has sold 7 million albums in the United States, with her first seven studio albums being certified platinum. In 2001, Lambert released a self-titled and self-financed independent album. After gaining exposure as the third-place winner of the television competition Nashville Star, Lambert signed with Epic Nashville in 2004.

Lambert's debut major-label album, Kerosene, was released in March 2005. Although its debut single, "Me and Charlie Talking", only reached 27 on the Billboard Hot Country Songs chart, the album debuted at number 1 on the Billboard Top Country Albums chart and 18 on the Billboard 200 list. The second single, entitled "Bring Me Down", was a second Top 40 hit. The release did not spawn a major hit until the title track was issued, peaking at number 15 on the Hot Country Songs chart, pressing the album to certify platinum in the United States. Her third album, Crazy Ex-Girlfriend, was released in May 2007, and also debuted at number 1 on the Top Country Albums chart, but peaked at number 6 on the Billboard 200 list. The title track was released as the lead single, but only peaked at number 50. The album's second single, "Famous in a Small Town", became her highest-peaking hit at that point, reaching number 14 in mid-2007. It was the third spawned single, entitled "Gunpowder & Lead", that yielded Lambert her first Top 10 hit on the Billboard Country Songs chart, peaking at number 7. The song's background and story yielded Crazy Ex-Girlfriend to certify gold in the United States in 2008, after selling 500,000 copies. The final single, "More Like Her", became her fourth Top 20 hit, after peaking at 17 in early 2009.

Revolution, was released in September 2009. It became Lambert's third release to debut at number 1 on the Billboard Top Country Albums chart, while also debuting at number 8 on the Billboard 200. The lead single, "Dead Flowers", was released in May 2009, and peaked within the Top 40. The album's second and third singles, "White Liar" and "The House That Built Me", have become her highest-charting singles to date. The final two singles from Revolution were "Only Prettier" and "Heart Like Mine", the latter has become Miranda's second number one hit. Her fifth studio album, Four the Record, was released in November 2011. The album produced five singles: "Baggage Claim", "Over You", "Fastest Girl in Town", "Mama's Broken Heart", and "All Kinds of Kinds". The first four singles reached the top 10 of the Billboard Hot Country Songs chart, with "Over You" becoming her third number one country single.

Lambert released her sixth studio album Platinum on June 3, 2014. The album debuted at number one on Billboard Top Country Albums as well as became her first number one on the Billboard 200 selling 180,000 copies in its first week. On the Top Country Albums chart, Lambert became the first artist to debut at number one on that chart with five consecutive albums. The album was met with widespread critical acclaim and earned her the Grammy Award for Best Country Album as well as a CMA Award and ACM Award in the same category. The album was certified platinum by the RIAA.

On November 18, 2016, Lambert released her seventh studio album titled The Weight of These Wings. It debuted at number three on the Billboard 200 and number one on Top Country albums chart selling 133,000 equivalent album units in its first week of release, becoming her sixth consecutive number one debut on the latter chart. She released her eighth studio album, Wildcard, on November 1, 2019. Wildcard became her seventh consecutive number-one album on the Top Country Albums chart, also reaching number four on the Billboard 200.

== Studio albums ==
Title	Album details	Peak chart positions						Certifications (sales threshold)
Title	Album details	US	US Country	AUS	CAN	UK	UK Country	Certifications (sales threshold)
Miranda Lambert	Release date: September 21, 2001; Label: Self-released; Format: CD	—	—	—	—	—	—	
Kerosene	Release date: March 15, 2005; Label: Epic Nashville; Format: CD, digital download	18	1	—	—	—	—	RIAA: Platinum
Crazy Ex-Girlfriend	Release date: May 1, 2007; Label: Columbia Nashville; Format: CD, digital download	6	1	—	—	—	—	RIAA: 2× Platinum
Revolution	Release date: September 29, 2009; Label: Columbia Nashville; Format: CD, digital download	8	1	—	—	—	—	RIAA: 2× Platinum; MC: Gold
Four the Record	Release date: November 1, 2011; Label: RCA Nashville; Format: CD, digital download	3	1	—	12	—	5	RIAA: Platinum
Platinum	Release date: June 3, 2014; Label: RCA Nashville; Format: CD, LP, digital download	1	1	8	1	52	2	RIAA: Platinum
The Weight of These Wings	Release date: November 18, 2016; Label: RCA Nashville; Format: CD, LP, digital download	3	1	26	5	70	3	RIAA: Platinum; MC: Gold
Wildcard	Release date: November 1, 2019; Label: RCA Nashville; Format: CD, LP, digital download	4	1	19	12	57	1	RIAA: Gold; MC: Gold
The Marfa Tapes (with Jack Ingram and Jon Randall)	Release date: May 7, 2021; Label: RCA Nashville; Format: LP, digital download	51	7	—	—	—	—	
Palomino	Release date: April 29, 2022; Label: RCA Nashville; Format: CD, LP, digital download	4	2	59	31	90	1	
Postcards from Texas	Release date: September 13, 2024; Label: Republic/Big Loud; Format: CD, LP, digital download	21	8	—	—	—	4	
Crisco	Release date: October 2, 2026; Label: Mercury Nashville; Format: CD, LP, digital download	19	4	—	—	—	1	
"—" denotes a recording that did not chart or was not released in that territory.

== Extended plays ==
Title	Extended play details
Dead Flowers	Release date: September 8, 2009; Label: Columbia Nashville; Format: CD

== Singles ==
=== 2000s ===
Title	Year	Peak chart positions				Certifications (sales threshold)	Album
Title	Year	US	US Country Songs	CAN Country	CAN	Certifications (sales threshold)	Album
"Texas Pride"	2001	—	—	—	—		Miranda Lambert
"Somebody Else"	2002	—	—	—	—		Miranda Lambert
"Me and Charlie Talking"	2004	—	27	—	—		Kerosene
"Bring Me Down"	2005	—	32	—	—		Kerosene
"Kerosene"	2005	61	15	25	—	RIAA: Platinum	Kerosene
"New Strings"	2006	— (Note: "New Strings" did not enter the Billboard Hot 100, but peaked at number 25 on the Bubbling Under Hot 100 chart.)	25	—	—		Kerosene
"Crazy Ex-Girlfriend"	2006	—	50	—	—		Crazy Ex-Girlfriend
"Famous in a Small Town"	2007	87	14	32	—	RIAA: Gold	Crazy Ex-Girlfriend
"Gunpowder & Lead"	2008	52	7	19	—	RIAA: 3× Platinum	Crazy Ex-Girlfriend
"More Like Her"	2008	90	17	34	—		Crazy Ex-Girlfriend
"Dead Flowers"	2009	—	37	—	—		Revolution
"White Liar"	2009	38	2	2	67	RIAA: 2× Platinum	Revolution
"—" denotes releases that did not chart

=== 2010s–2020s ===
Title	Year	Peak chart positions					Certifications (sales threshold)	Album
Title	Year	US	US Country Songs	US Country Airplay	CAN	CAN Country	Certifications (sales threshold)	Album
"The House That Built Me"	2010	28	1		52	2	RIAA: 4× Platinum	Revolution
"Only Prettier"	2010	61	12		—	31	RIAA: Platinum	Revolution
"Heart Like Mine"	2011	44	1		69	2	RIAA: Platinum	Revolution
"Baggage Claim"	2011	44	3		74	2	RIAA: Gold	Four the Record
"Over You"	2012	35	1		52	1	RIAA: 2× Platinum	Four the Record
"Fastest Girl in Town"	2012	47	7	3	72	10	RIAA: Gold	Four the Record
"Mama's Broken Heart"	2013	20	2	2	30	1	RIAA: 3× Platinum	Four the Record
"All Kinds of Kinds"	2013	89	24	15	92	12		Four the Record
"Automatic"	2014	35	4	3	34	1	RIAA: Platinum	Platinum
"Somethin' Bad" (with Carrie Underwood)	2014	19	1	7	33	6	RIAA: 2× Platinum	Platinum
"Little Red Wagon"	2015	55	5	16	56	22	RIAA: Platinum	Platinum
"Smokin' and Drinkin'" (featuring Little Big Town)	2015	—	32	33	—	46		Platinum
"Vice"	2016	47	2	11	78	4	RIAA: 2× Platinum; MC: Gold	The Weight of These Wings
"We Should Be Friends"	2016	— (Note: "We Should Be Friends" did not enter the Billboard Hot 100, but peaked at number six on the Bubbling Under Hot 100 chart.)	25	26	—	20		The Weight of These Wings
"Tin Man"	2017	75	15	22	—	50	RIAA: Platinum; MC: Gold	The Weight of These Wings
"Keeper of the Flame"	2018	—	—	55	—	—		The Weight of These Wings
"It All Comes Out in the Wash"	2019	70	12	14	—	10	RIAA: Gold; MC: Gold	Wildcard
"Bluebird"	2019	26	3	1	46	1	RIAA: 2× Platinum; MC: 2× Platinum	Wildcard
"Settling Down"	2020	41	6	6	51	1	RIAA: Platinum; MC: Platinum	Wildcard
"If I Was a Cowboy"	2021	53	8	12	53	3	RIAA: Gold; MC: Platinum	Palomino
"Strange"	2022	—	48	43	—	—		Palomino
"Wranglers"	2024	—	31	35	—	—		Postcards from Texas
"Run"	2025	—	—	31	—	—		Postcards from Texas
"A Song to Sing" (with Chris Stapleton)	2025	— (Note: "A Song to Sing" did not enter the Billboard Hot 100, but peaked at number eight on the Bubbling Under Hot 100 chart.)	30	17	—	38		Crisco
"Snakeskin Boots" (featuring Ella Langley)	2026	42	12	31	70	32		Crisco
"—" denotes releases that did not chart

=== As featured artist ===
Title	Year	Peak chart positions							Certifications (sales threshold)	Album
Title	Year	US Country Songs	US Country Airplay	US	AUS	CAN	CAN Country	SCO	Certifications (sales threshold)	Album
"Coal Miner's Daughter" (Loretta Lynn featuring Sheryl Crow and Miranda Lambert)	2010	55		—	—	—	—	—		Coal Miner's Daughter: A Tribute to Loretta Lynn
"We Were Us" (Keith Urban with Miranda Lambert)	2013	1	1	26	—	25	2	—	RIAA: Platinum; MC: Gold	Fuse
"Wrote a Song for Everyone" (John Fogerty featuring Miranda Lambert and Tom Morello)	2013	—	—	—	—	—	—	—		Wrote a Song for Everyone
"Annie's New Gun" (Gwen Sebastian featuring Miranda Lambert)	2014	—	—	—	—	—	—	—		Gwen Sebastian
"Forever Country" (as a member of Artists of Then, Now & Forever)	2016	1	33	21	26	25	39	29	RIAA: Gold	Non-album single
"Drowns the Whiskey" (Jason Aldean featuring Miranda Lambert)	2018	3	1	32	—	53	1	—	RIAA: Platinum; MC: Gold	Rearview Town
"Drunk (And I Don't Wanna Go Home)" (Elle King with Miranda Lambert)	2021	6	1	37	—	73	28	—	RIAA: Platinum; MC: 2× Platinum; RMNZ: Gold	Come Get Your Wife
"Space in My Heart" (Enrique Iglesias with Miranda Lambert)	2024	—	—	—	—	—	—	—		Final (Vol. 2)
"—" denotes releases that did not chart

=== Promotional singles ===
Title	Year	Peak chart positions		Album
Title	Year	US Country Songs	US Country Digital	Album
"Roots and Wings"	2015	32	7	Non-album single
"Locomotive"	2019	—	25	Wildcard
"Mess with My Head"	2019	45	6	Wildcard
"Way Too Pretty for Prison" (with Maren Morris)	2019	—	11	Wildcard
"Pretty Bitchin'"	2019	—	18	Wildcard
"Fooled Around and Fell in Love" (featuring Maren Morris, Ashley McBryde, Tenille Townes, Caylee Hammack, and Elle King)	2019	47	7	Non-album single
"Tequila Does"	2019	47	8	Wildcard
"In His Arms" (with Jack Ingram and Jon Randall)	2021	—	22	The Marfa Tapes
"Y'all Means All"	2021	—	—	Non-album single
"Dammit Randy"	2024	—	—	Postcards from Texas
"Alimony"	2024	—	—	Postcards from Texas
"No Man's Land"	2024	—	—	Postcards from Texas
"Trailblazer" (with Reba McEntire and Lainey Wilson)	2025	44	—	Non-album single
"Crisco"	2026	—	—	Crisco
"Till the Going's Gone"	2026	—	—	Crisco
"—" denotes releases that did not chart

== Other charted songs ==
Title	Year	Peak chart positions						Certifications (sales threshold)	Album
Title	Year	US	US Country Songs	US Country Airplay	US Country Digital	CAN	CAN Country	Certifications (sales threshold)	Album
"Run Daddy Run" (featuring Pistol Annies)	2012	—	—	—	31	—	—		The Hunger Games: Songs from District 12 and Beyond
"Jingle Bell Rock" (with Blake Shelton)	2012	—	37	34	—	—	45		Cheers, It's Christmas
"Platinum"	2014	—	50	—	—	—	—		Platinum
"Bathroom Sink"	2015	—	—	—	49	—	—		Platinum
"Sweet By & By"	2016	—	40	—	20	—	—		Southern Family
"Actin' Up"	2022	—	49	—	—	—	—		Palomino
"Outrunnin' Your Memory" (with Luke Combs)	2022	—	27	—	—	—	—	RIAA: Gold	Growin' Up
"Butterfly Season" (Ella Langley featuring Miranda Lambert)	2026	71	26	—	—	86	—		Dandelion
"Horses and Divorces" (Kacey Musgraves featuring Miranda Lambert)	2026	84	23	—	—	—	—		Middle of Nowhere
"—" denotes releases that did not chart

== Videography ==
=== Video albums ===
Title	Details
Revolution: Live by Candlelight	Release date: October 12, 2010; Label: Sony Music Nashville; Format: DVD

=== Music videos ===
Title	Year	Director
"Me and Charlie Talking"	2004	Trey Fanjoy
"Bring Me Down"	2005	Kristin Barlowe
"Kerosene"	2005	Trey Fanjoy
"New Strings"	2006	Trey Fanjoy
"Famous in a Small Town"	2007	Trey Fanjoy
"Gunpowder & Lead" (Live)	2008	Ivan Dudynsky
"More Like Her"	2008	Randee St. Nicholas
"Dead Flowers"	2009	Randee St. Nicholas
"White Liar"	2009	Chris Hicky
"The House That Built Me"	2010	Trey Fanjoy
"Only Prettier"	2010	Trey Fanjoy
"Heart Like Mine" (Live)	2011	Justin Luffman
"Baggage Claim" (Live)	2011	Paul Miller
"Over You"	2012	Trey Fanjoy
"Fastest Girl in Town"	2012	Trey Fanjoy
"Mama's Broken Heart"	2013	Trey Fanjoy
"All Kinds of Kinds"	2013	Bluford Sanders
"Automatic"	2014	Trey Fanjoy
"Somethin' Bad" (with Carrie Underwood)	2014	Trey Fanjoy
"Little Red Wagon"	2015	Trey Fanjoy
"Smokin' and Drinkin'" (Live) (with Little Big Town)	2015	Paul Miller
"Vice"	2016	Trey Fanjoy
"We Should Be Friends"	2017	Trey Fanjoy
"Tin Man" (Live)	2017	Joe DeMaio
"Keeper of the Flame"	2018	Trey Fanjoy
"It All Comes Out in the Wash"	2019	Trey Fanjoy
"Fooled Around and Fell in Love"	2019	Michael Monaco
"Bluebird"	2020	Trey Fanjoy
"Settling Down"	2020	Trey Fanjoy
"Tequila Does"	2020	Trey Fanjoy
"If I Was a Cowboy" (version 1)	2021	Trey Fanjoy
"If I Was a Cowboy" (version 2)	2022	Trey Fanjoy
"Strange"	2022	Trey Fanjoy
"If You Were Mine" (with Leon Bridges)	2023	Reid Long
"Wranglers"	2024	Trey Fanjoy
"Run"	2025	Kate Rentz
"A Song to Sing" (with Chris Stapleton)	2025	Running Bear

=== Guest appearances ===
Title	Year	Director
"Bad Angel" (with Dierks Bentley and Jamey Johnson)	2010	George Flanigen
"Coal Miner's Daughter" (with Loretta Lynn and Sheryl Crow)	2010	Deaton-Flanigen
"We Were Us" (with Keith Urban)	2013	Reid Long
"Forever Country" (Artists of Then, Now & Forever)	2016	Joseph Kahn
"Drowns the Whiskey" (with Jason Aldean)	2018	Shaun Silva
"Drunk (And I Don't Wanna Go Home)" (with Elle King)	2021	Alexa & Stephen Kinigopoulos

== Other album appearances ==
List of other album appearances, showing year released, other artists, and album name
Title	Year	Other artist(s)	Album	Ref.
"Today I Started Loving You Again"	2003	Buddy Jewell	Buddy Jewell	
"Jailhouse Rock"	2007	—N/a	Elvis: Viva Las Vegas	
"Grown Woman"	2007	Jason Aldean	Relentless	
"Home"	2008	Blake Shelton	Pure BS	
"Bare Skin Rug"	2008	Blake Shelton	Startin' Fires	
"The Fabric of My Life"	2009	—N/a	Cotton: The Fabric of My Life	
"Strangers on a Train"	2009	David Nail	I'm About to Come Alive	
"Bad Angel"	2010	Dierks Bentley; Jamey Johnson	Up on the Ridge	
"Draggin' the River"	2010	Blake Shelton	All About Tonight	
"Red River Blue"	2011	Blake Shelton	Red River Blue	
"Jingle Bell Rock"	2012	Blake Shelton	Cheers It's Christmas	
"Wrote a Song for Everyone"	2013	John Fogerty; Tom Morello	Wrote a Song for Everyone	
"We Were Us"	2013	Keith Urban	Fuse	
"Old Habits"	2013	Justin Moore	Off the Beaten Path	
"She Was No Good for Me"	2013	Willie Nelson	To All the Girls...	
"Two of a Crime"	2015	—N/a	Hot Pursuit	
"I Wish You Were Here"	2016	Charles Kelley	The Driver	
"Ordinary World"	2017	Billie Joe Armstrong	Greatest Hits: God's Favorite Band	
"Drowns the Whiskey"	2018	Jason Aldean	Rearview Town	
"My Father's Gun"	2018	—N/a	Restoration: Reimagining the Songs of Elton John and Bernie Taupin	
"Jive Talkin'"	2021	Barry Gibb	Greenfields: The Gibb Brothers' Songbook, Vol. 1	
"I'm Just An Old Chunk Of Coal (But I'm Gonna Be A Diamond Someday)"	2022	Various Artists	Live Forever (A Tribute To: Billy Joe Shaver)	
"Good Horses"	2024	Lainey Wilson	Whirlwind	
"Hello Shitty Day"	2024	Jake Worthington		

== See also ==
- Pistol Annies
