= Livin' Like Hippies Tour =

2018 concert tour by Miranda Lambert

Livin’ Like Hippies Tour
- Tour by Miranda Lambert
- Tour poster
- Location: North America
- Associated album: The Weight of These Wings
- Start date: January 18, 2018
- End date: June 17, 2018
- Legs: 1
- No. of shows: 27

Miranda Lambert concert chronology
- Highway Vagabond Tour (2017); Livin’ Like Hippies Tour (2018); The Bandwagon Tour (2018)

The Livin’ Like Hippies Tour was the eighth headlining concert tour by American country music artist Miranda Lambert. It began on January 18, 2018, in Greenville, South Carolina and ended on June 17, 2018, in Grand Junction, Colorado. It is Lambert's second tour in support of her sixth studio album The Weight of These Wings (2016) following the Highway Vagabond Tour.

== Background and show ==
The tour was announced in September 2017, and the tour name "Livin’ Like Hippies" are lyrics from the track, " Highway Vagabond".

Lambert opens the show with "That's The Way That The World Goes 'Round" and "Kerosene". After singing past hits and album tracks she ends with "Little Red Wagon".

== Critical reception ==
Timothy Finn of The Kansas City Star writes, "Miranda Lambert shows Sprint Center crowd why country music needs more women stars." Also "But Lambert's more effective songs are those in which she is at her most vulnerable, in which she admits to her deficiencies and bares her faults, and she sang several of those."

Maggie Jones of Knoxville News Sentinel described the Knoxville show as Lambert "...showcased sass, vulnerability and most of all, relatability, as she sang about her quirks, flaws and passions, and how she's accepted them."

== Opening acts ==
- Brent Cobb
- Ashley McBryde
- Jon Pardi
- Lucie Silvas
- The Steel Woods
- Sunny Sweeney
- Turnpike Troubadours
- Charlie Worsham

== Setlist ==
1. "That's The Way That The World Goes 'Round"
2. "Kerosene"
3. "Highway Vagabond"
4. "We Should Be Friends"
5. ”Vice"
6. ”Heart Like Mine"
7. ”Bathroom Sink"
8. "Over You"
9. "All Kinds of Kinds"
10. "The House That Built Me"
11. "Gunpowder & Lead"
12. "Ugly Lights
13. "Mama's Broken Heart"
14. "Old Sh!t" (with Brent Cobb)
15. "Tin Man"
16. "Airstream Song"
17. "Pink Sunglasses"
18. "Rocky Mountain Way" (Joe Walsh cover)
19. "Automatic"
20. "White Liar"

Encore

21. "Little Red Wagon"

== Tour dates ==
| Dates | City | Country | Venue | Opening acts |
North America
| January 18, 2018 | Greenville | United States | Bon Secours Wellness Arena | Brent Cobb; Jon Pardi |
| January 19, 2018 | Orlando | United States | Amway Center | Brent Cobb; Jon Pardi |
| January 20, 2018 | Duluth | United States | Infinite Energy Center | Brent Cobb; Jon Pardi |
| February 1, 2018 | Tacoma | United States | Tacoma Dome | Turnpike Troubadours; Jon Pardi |
| February 2, 2018 | Spokane | United States | Spokane Arena | Turnpike Troubadours; Jon Pardi |
| February 3, 2018 | Eugene | United States | Matthew Knight Arena | Turnpike Troubadours; Jon Pardi |
| February 8, 2018 | Sacramento | United States | Golden 1 Center | Lucie Silvas; Jon Pardi |
| February 9, 2018 | Fresno | United States | Save Mart Center | Lucie Silvas; Jon Pardi |
| February 10, 2018 | Inglewood | United States | The Forum | Lucie Silvas; Jon Pardi |
| February 15, 2018 | San Diego | United States | Viejas Arena | Lucie Silvas; Jon Pardi |
| February 16, 2018 | Ontario | United States | Citizens Business Bank Arena | Lucie Silvas; Jon Pardi |
| February 17, 2018 | Phoenix | United States | Talking Stick Resort Arena | Lucie Silvas; Jon Pardi |
| March 1, 2018 | Knoxville | United States | Thompson-Boling Arena | The Steel Woods; Jon Pardi |
| March 2, 2018 | Lexington | United States | Rupp Arena | The Steel Woods; Jon Pardi |
| March 3, 2018 | Cleveland | United States | Wolstein Center | The Steel Woods; Jon Pardi |
| March 8, 2018 | Omaha | United States | CenturyLink Center | Sunny Sweeney; Jon Pardi |
| March 9, 2018 | Oklahoma City | United States | Chesapeake Arena | Sunny Sweeney; Jon Pardi |
| March 10, 2018 | North Little Rock | United States | Verizon Arena | Sunny Sweeney; Jon Pardi |
| March 15, 2018 | Des Moines | United States | Wells Fargo Arena | Ashley McBryde; Jon Pardi |
| March 16, 2018 | St. Louis | United States | Scottrade Center | Ashley McBryde; Jon Pardi |
| March 17, 2018 | Kansas City | United States | Sprint Center | Ashley McBryde; Jon Pardi |
| March 22, 2018 | Newark | United States | Prudential Center | Charlie Worsham; Jon Pardi |
| March 23, 2018 | State College | United States | Bryce Jordan Center | Charlie Worsham; Jon Pardi |
| March 24, 2018 | Winston-Salem | United States | Lawrence Joel Veterans Memorial Coliseum | Charlie Worsham; Jon Pardi |
| June 2, 2018 | Durant | United States | Choctaw Casino and Resort | |
| June 9, 2018 | Winsted | United States | Winstock Festival | — |
| June 14–17, 2018 | Grand Junction | United States | Country Jam Ranch | — |

=== Box office score ===
| Venue | City | Attendance | Revenue |
|---|---|---|---|
| Amphitheater at the Wharf | Orange Beach | 9,627 / 9,627 | $497,585 |
