= 54th Annual Country Music Association Awards =

2020 music award ceremony

- Date: November 11, 2020
- Location: Music City Center, Nashville, Tennessee, U.S.
- Hosted by: Reba McEntire; Darius Rucker

Highlights
- Most wins: Maren Morris (3)
- Most nominations: Miranda Lambert (7)

Television/radio coverage
- Network: ABC
- Viewership: 7.1 million

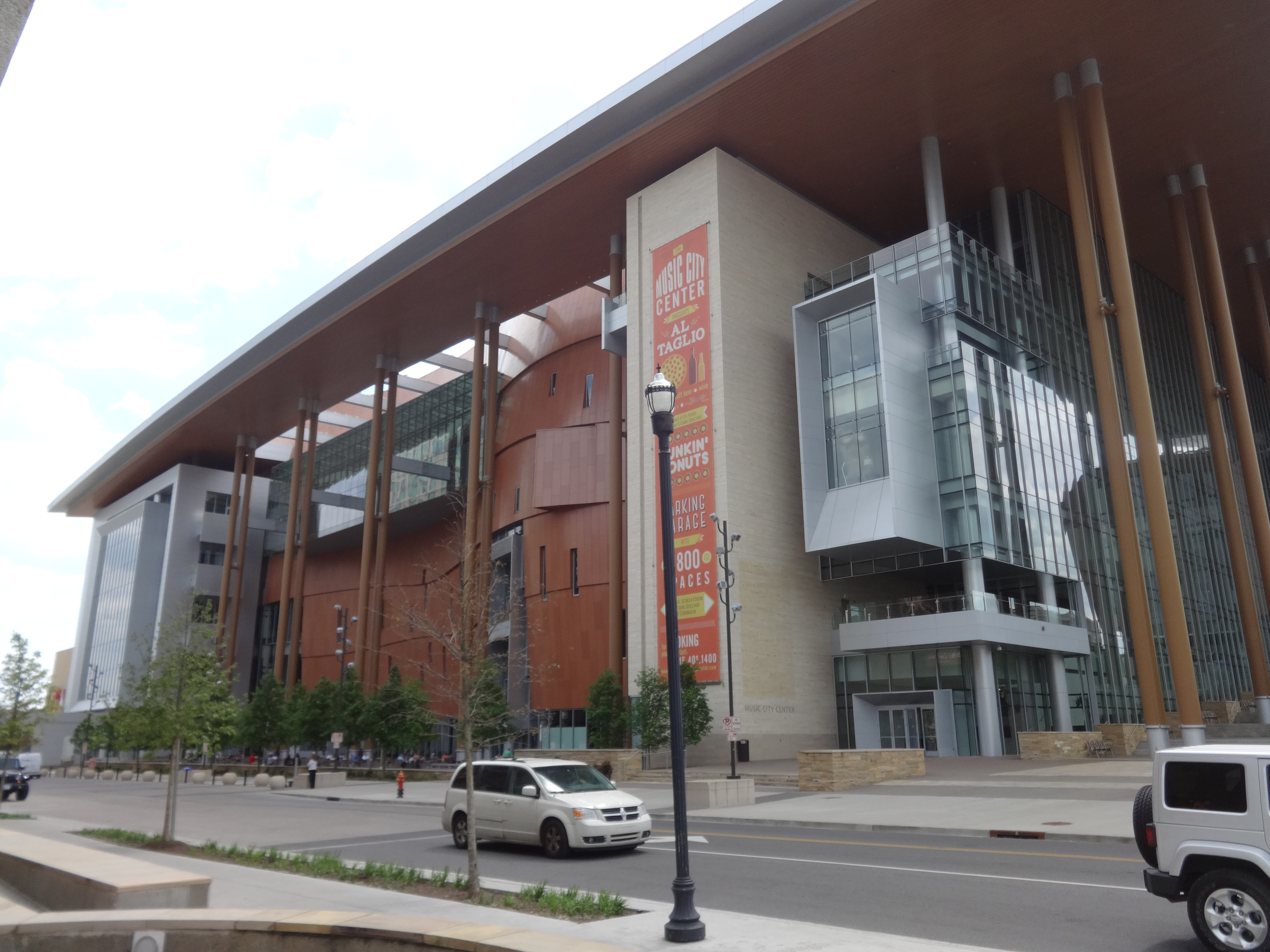
Exterior of the Music City Center in Nashville, Tennessee

The 54th Annual Country Music Association Awards were held on Wednesday, November 11, 2020, at the Music City Center in Nashville, Tennessee and was hosted by CMA Award winners Reba McEntire and Darius Rucker.

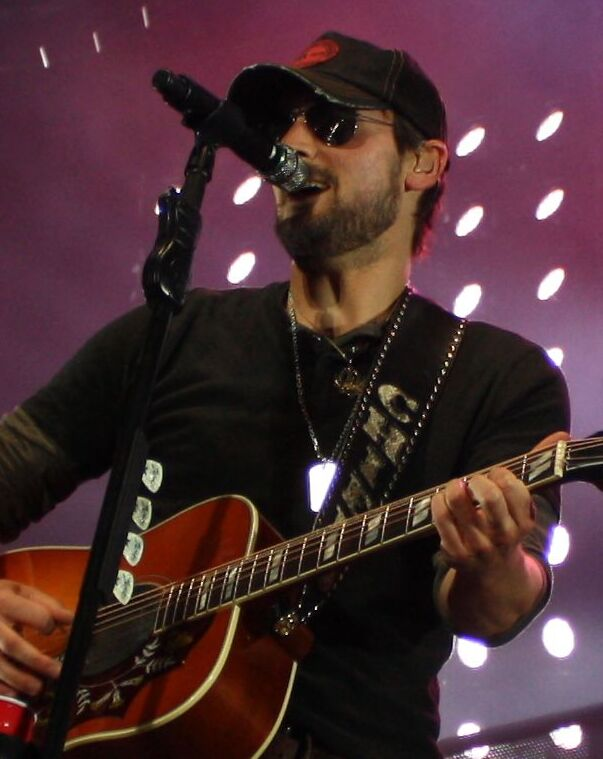
Eric Church, Entertainer of the Year recipient.

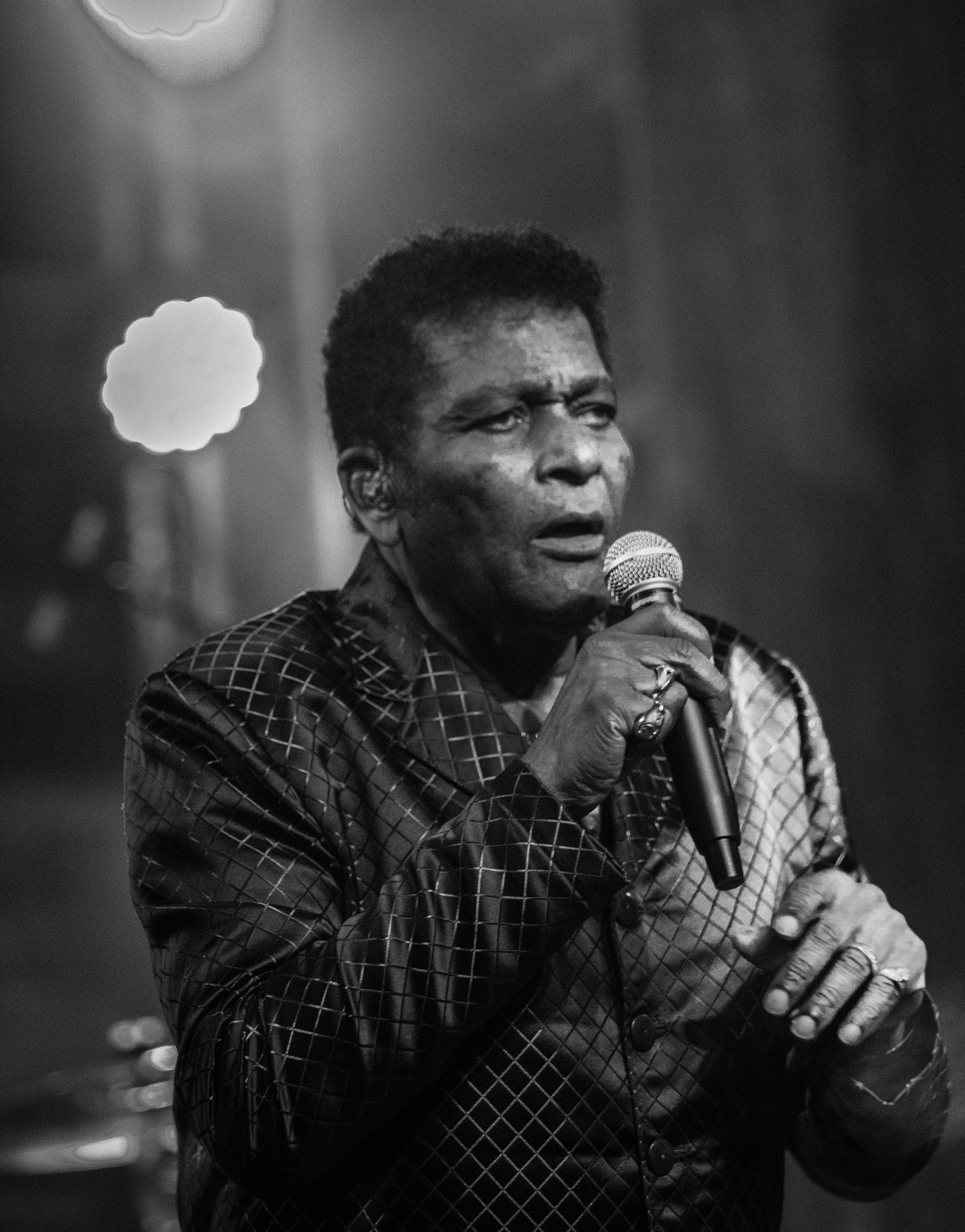
Charley Pride, Willie Nelson Lifetime Achievement award recipient.

== Background ==
Darius Rucker is the second African-American artist to co-host the award show after Charley Pride, who co-hosted the 1975 ceremony.

On October 22, the CMA announced that Pride would be the recipient of the 2020 Willie Nelson Lifetime Achievement Award. It would be Pride's last public appearance before his death that December.

On November 9, following the announcement that two of the artists (Lee Brice and Tyler Hubbard of Florida Georgia Line) originally scheduled to perform on the CMA Awards had tested positive for COVID-19, the CMA released a statement to Entertainment Tonight explaining that "We have been extremely diligent with our testing process in advance of anyone entering our footprint. Every single person has been tested, and many will be tested repeatedly throughout the week. This is in addition to wearing PPE and of course practicing social and physical distancing. We have an incredible show planned and look forward to bringing the country music community together. However, our number one priority has been and will continue to be the safety of our artists, our crew and our staff. That will never be compromised."

In order to mitigate the likelihood of spreading coronavirus during the ceremony, only the nominees, their staff, guests and the crew were allowed into the venue and the traditional red carpet did not take place. Longtime CMA producer Roger Deaton confirmed to The Tennessean that the show would incorporate both live and pre-recorded performances (with around 60% being performed live) and that multiple stages throughout the venue would be utilized in order to account for how each stage must be fully cleaned and sanitized by crew members following a performance, taking about fifteen to twenty minutes. Seating arrangements for the attendees were designed to strictly adhere to social distancing guidelines, with a banquet-style layout akin to the inaugural untelevised CMA Awards wherein an artist and their guests each have their own table which is spaced eight meters apart from the other tables. After Pride's death, speculation arose that he may have caught the virus from an asymptomatic carrier at the ceremony who had gone undetected.

== Winners and nominees ==
The nominees were announced on September 1, 2020 by Luke Combs and Carly Pearce on Good Morning America as well as by Ingrid Andress and Gabby Barrett on the CMA YouTube channel. The eligibility period for the 54th CMA Awards was from July 1, 2019 to June 30, 2020.

Winners in Bold.

Entertainer of the Year	Album of the Year
**Eric Church**; Luke Combs; Miranda Lambert; Carrie Underwood; Keith Urban	**What You See Is What You Get — Luke Combs**; Heartache Medication — Jon Pardi; Never Will — Ashley McBryde; Old Dominion — Old Dominion; Wildcard — Miranda Lambert
Male Vocalist of the Year	Female Vocalist of the Year
**Luke Combs**; Eric Church; Thomas Rhett; Chris Stapleton; Keith Urban	**Maren Morris**; Miranda Lambert; Ashley McBryde; Kacey Musgraves; Carrie Underwood
Vocal Group of the Year	Vocal Duo of the Year
**Old Dominion**; Lady A; Little Big Town; Midland; Rascal Flatts	**Dan + Shay**; Brooks & Dunn; Brothers Osborne; Florida Georgia Line; Maddie & Tae
Single of the Year	Song of the Year
**"The Bones" — Maren Morris**; "10,000 Hours" — Dan + Shay and Justin Bieber; "Beer Never Broke My Heart " — Luke Combs; "Bluebird" — Miranda Lambert; "I Hope" — Gabby Barrett	**"The Bones" — Maren Morris, Jimmy Robbins, and Laura Veltz**; "Bluebird" — Miranda Lambert, Luke Dick and Natalie Hemby; "Even Though I'm Leaving " — Luke Combs, Wyatt Durrette III and Ray Fulcher; "I Hope You're Happy Now " — Carly Pearce, Luke Combs, Randy Montana and Jonathan Singleton; "More Hearts Than Mine " — Ingrid Andress, Sam Ellis and Derrick Southerland
New Artist of the Year	Musician of the Year
**Morgan Wallen**; Jimmie Allen; Ingrid Andress; Gabby Barrett; Carly Pearce	**Jenee Fleenor, Fiddle**; Paul Franklin, Steel Guitar; Rob McNelley, Guitar; Ilya Toshinsky, Guitar; Derek Wells, Guitar
Music Video of the Year	Musical Event of the Year
**"Bluebird" — Miranda Lambert; (Dir. Trey Fanjoy)**; "10,000 Hours " — Dan + Shay and Justin Bieber; (Dir. Patrick Tracy); "Homemade" — Jake Owen; (Dir. Justin Clough); "I Hope You're Happy Now" — Carly Pearce and Lee Brice; (Dir. Sam Siske); "Second One to Know " — Chris Stapleton; (Dir. David Coleman)	**"I Hope You're Happy Now" — Carly Pearce and Lee Brice**; "10,000 Hours " — Dan + Shay and Justin Bieber; "Be a Light " — Thomas Rhett, Reba McEntire, Hillary Scott, Chris Tomlin and Keith Urban; "The Bones " — Maren Morris and Hozier; "Fooled Around and Fell in Love " — Miranda Lambert, Maren Morris, Ashley McBryde, Tenille Townes, Caylee Hammack and Elle King
Willie Nelson Lifetime Achievement Award
**Charley Pride**

=== International Awards ===
Award	Recipient
International Country Broadcaster Award	Ben Earle
Jo Walker-Meador International Award	John Esposito
Jeff Walker Global Country Artist Award	Ilse DeLange

== Performers ==
The first wave of performers were announced on October 29, 2020, followed by the second wave on November 5.

Artist(s)	Song(s)
Dierks Bentley; Brothers Osborne; Ashley McBryde; Jason Aldean	Tribute to Charlie Daniels "Long Haired Country Boy" "Trudy" "Texas" "The Devil Went Down to Georgia"
Morgan Wallen	"More Than My Hometown"
Gabby Barrett; Cade Foehner; Charlie Puth	"I Hope"
Eric Church	"Hell of a View"
Darius Rucker	"Beers and Sunshine"
Ashley McBryde	"One Night Standards"
Dan + Shay; Justin Bieber	"10,000 Hours"
Luke Combs	"Cold as You"
Jon Pardi	Tribute to Joe Diffie "Pickup Man"
Carly Pearce; Charles Kelley	"I Hope You're Happy Now"
Darius Rucker; Reba McEntire	Tribute to Mac Davis "In the Ghetto"
Miranda Lambert	"Settling Down"
Jimmie Allen	"Best Shot"
Charley Pride; Jimmie Allen	Willie Nelson Lifetime Achievement Award honoring Charley Pride "Kiss an Angel Good Mornin'"
Chris Stapleton; Morgane Stapleton	"Starting Over"
Ingrid Andress	"More Hearts Than Mine"
Thomas Rhett; Reba McEntire; Chris Tomlin	"Be a Light"
Little Big Town	Tribute to Kenny Rogers "Sweet Music Man"
Brothers Osborne	"All Night"
Old Dominion	"Lookin' for Love"
Maren Morris	"The Bones"
Keith Urban	"God Whispered Your Name"
Kelsea Ballerini	"Hole in the Bottle"

=== Artists test positive for COVID-19 ===
On November 8, 2020, Lee Brice was forced to pull out of performing his multi-nominated song "I Hope You're Happy Now" with Carly Pearce after testing positive for coronavirus. Charles Kelley from Lady A was later announced to be performing Brice's part alongside Pearce. On November 9, Tyler Hubbard of Florida Georgia Line revealed that he had also tested positive, resulting in the duo's performance of "Long Live" being cancelled, with their slot being given to Kelsea Ballerini who was originally not scheduled to appear. Both Brice and Hubbard received their positive test results before entering CMA rehearsals. Jenee Fleenor also tested positive for COVID-19 and her part in the Charlie Daniels tribute was given to Dan Hochhalter, the fiddle player in Dierks Bentley's band. Ahead of the awards, Lady A announced that, while the band themselves had all tested negative, a member of their immediate family had tested positive and they had made the decision not to attend the show, therefore not appearing alongside Thomas Rhett and Darius Rucker as planned. Kelley's performance with Pearce had been pre-recorded and aired as part of the show. Rascal Flatts also did not perform "Bless the Broken Road" after a member of the band tested positive.

Charley Pride later tested positive after the show, an infection that later proved fatal. It is under investigation how Pride caught the virus.

== Presenters ==
Presenter(s)	Award
Bobby Bones	Single of the Year
Taylor Hill	Song of the Year
Lauren Akins	New Artist of the Year
Dierks Bentley	Vocal Duo of the Year
Lauren Alaina and Patrick Schwarzenegger	Vocal Group of the Year
Jake Owen	Album of the Year
Charles Esten	Female Vocalist of the Year
Sara Evans	Male Vocalist of the Year
Darius Rucker and Reba McEntire	Entertainer of the Year

CeCe Winans introduced Darius Rucker & Reba McEntire's performance.

== Nominee milestones ==
Courtesy of Billboard.

- As the top nominee with seven nods, Miranda Lambert overtakes Reba McEntire as the most nominated woman in CMA history, with 55 total nominations to McEntire's 51. Lambert is now the fourth most-nominated artist behind Brad Paisley (58), Alan Jackson (81) and George Strait (83).
- Additionally, with Lambert's nominations for Album, Single and Song of the Year, she matches Jackson (1990, 1991, 1993 and 2002) as the only artist in CMA history to be nominated in all three categories four times (after previously sweeping the categories in 2010, 2014 and 2017). She also ties Paisley as the second most-nominated artist in the Single of the Year category with 8 nominations behind Strait's nine.
- Keith Urban's Entertainer of the Year nod brings his career total to 13 nominations, second only to Strait's 19.
- Lambert and Underwood's nominations for Entertainer of the Year marks the first time that two women have been nominated in the category at the same time since 1979 when Crystal Gayle and Barbara Mandrell were nominated. It is also worth noting that Faith Hill and the Dixie Chicks were both nominated in 2000, but Lambert and Underwood is the first time that two solo women have been nominated since Gayle and Mandrell.
- Lambert, Morris and Barrett's nominations for Single of the Year also mark the first time three women have been nominated in the category since 1994 when Mary Chapin Carpenter, Patty Loveless and Reba McEntire were all featured.
- Andress, Barrett and Pearce's nominations for New Artist of the Year mark the first time three female artists have been nominated in the category since 1999 when Sara Evans, Chely Wright and eventual winner Jo Dee Messina were nominated. Additionally, Jimmie Allen's nomination in the category is the first for an African American artist since Darius Rucker won in 2009.
- Brooks & Dunn's 21'st Vocal Duo of the Year nomination extends their lead as the highest nominated act in that category.
- For the first time since the 1977 CMA Awards, all five Single of the Year nominees reached the top thirty on the all-genre Billboard Hot 100 chart.
- "10,000 Hours" is the fourth collaboration with a pop star to be nominated for Single of the Year, following Willie Nelson and Julio Iglesias' "To All the Girls I've Loved Before", Jason Aldean and Kelly Clarkson's "Don't You Wanna Stay" and Bebe Rexha and Florida Georgia Line's "Meant to Be".

== Controversies ==
=== Garth Brooks ===
On July 30, 2020, Garth Brooks announced that he wanted his name to be permanently out of contention for Entertainer of the Year. After he won the 2019 Entertainer of the Year award, it caused a social media firestorm; many fans and artists believed Carrie Underwood or Eric Church deserved to win the award over Brooks. Brooks stated that after the last win, that it was "not that fun, to tell you the truth." As he absorbed the backlash after the November awards show, Brooks said, he couldn't shake the sentiment expressed in one of the tweets he read: "It said, 'Hey man, this guy, why doesn't he step down and just [leave] the entertainer for the next generation?'" He said he realized that taking his name out of the running was his only way forward. The timing of his announcement came just two days before the second round of voting begins for the annual awards, "I'm very grateful for the time that I've got to go [win]," he said, but now, "somebody else needs to hold that." According to a statement released July 30, 2020 by the Country Music Association, "The long-standing CMA Awards rules do not allow individuals to remove themselves from the balloting process at any point."

In 2021, Brooks restated that his position on receiving a nomination for Entertainer of the Year still stands.

=== John Prine ===
After airing, the CMA Awards received criticism from artists Sturgill Simpson, Jason Isbell and Amanda Shires for failing to mention John Prine who had died in April following complications from COVID-19 as well as Billy Joe Shaver and Jerry Jeff Walker who both died in October, with Isbell noting that he and Shires had returned their CMA membership cards in protest. A statement from Prine's label Oh Boy Records read "we're disappointed John won't be a part of the CMA award show tonight. Country music was both the inspiration and foundation for his songwriting and performing. While there may be a number of artists who have had more commercial success than John, there are very few who achieved more artistically".
