= 51st Annual Country Music Association Awards =

2017 US music award ceremony

- Date: November 8, 2017
- Location: Bridgestone Arena, Nashville, Tennessee, U.S.
- Hosted by: Brad Paisley; Carrie Underwood

Highlights
- Most wins: Chris Stapleton (2)
- Most nominations: Miranda Lambert (5)

Television/radio coverage
- Network: ABC
- Viewership: 14.3 million

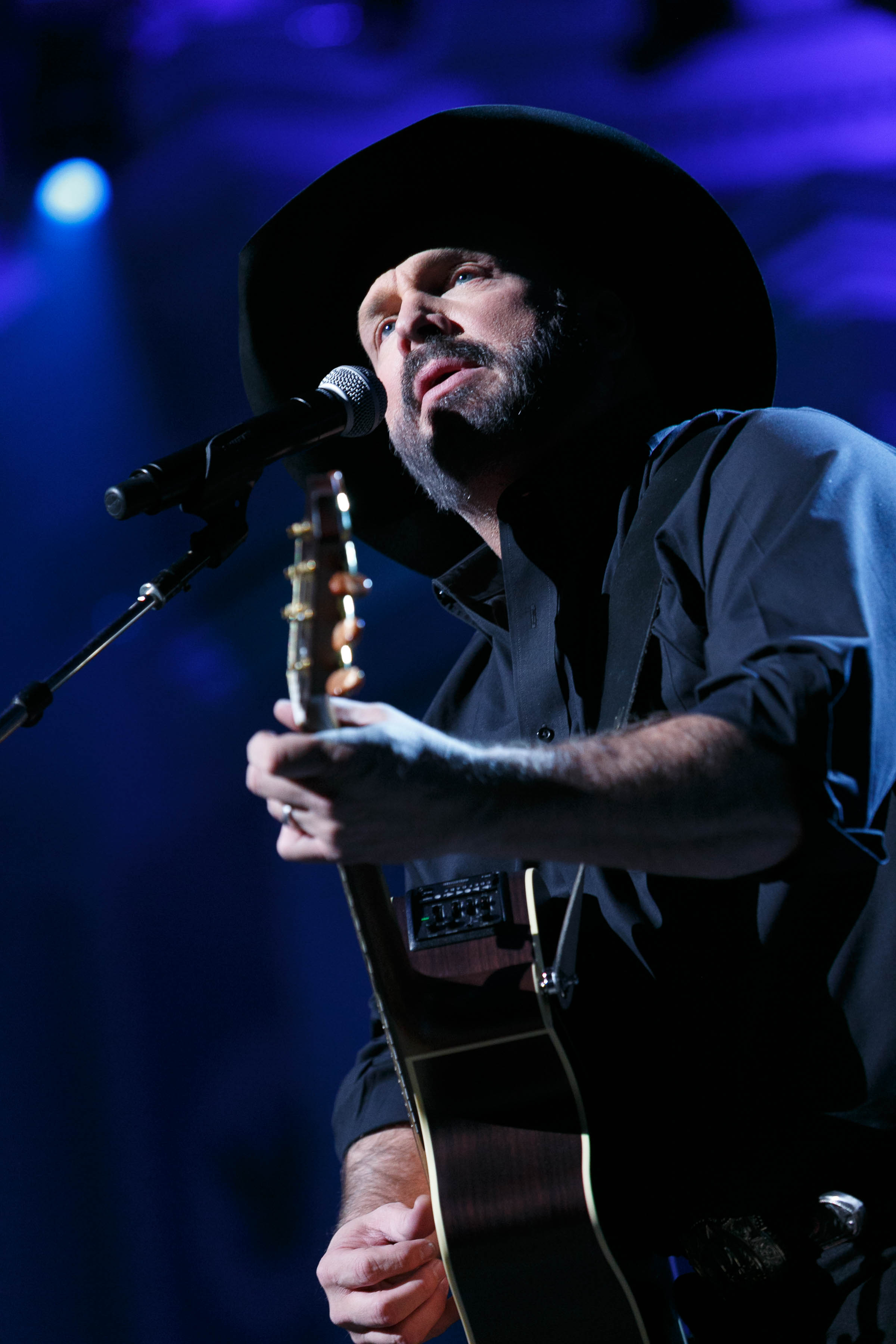
Garth Brooks, Entertainer of the Year recipient.

The 51st Annual Country Music Association Awards, commonly known as the 51st CMA Awards, was held on November 8, 2017, at the Bridgestone Arena in Nashville, Tennessee and was hosted for the tenth time by Brad Paisley and Carrie Underwood.

The nominations were announced on September 4, 2017, on Good Morning America by Lauren Alaina, Dustin Lynch, and Brothers Osborne.

== Winners and nominees ==
Note: The winners are shown in Bold.

Entertainer of the Year	Album of the Year
**Garth Brooks**; Luke Bryan; Eric Church; Chris Stapleton; Keith Urban	**From A Room: Volume 1 —** **Chris Stapleton**; The Breaker — Little Big Town; Heart Break — Lady Antebellum; The Nashville Sound — Jason Isbell; The Weight of These Wings — Miranda Lambert
Male Vocalist of the Year	Female Vocalist of the Year
**Chris Stapleton**; Dierks Bentley; Eric Church; Thomas Rhett; Keith Urban	**Miranda Lambert**; Kelsea Ballerini; Reba McEntire; Maren Morris; Carrie Underwood
Vocal Group of the Year	Vocal Duo of the Year
**Little Big Town**; Lady Antebellum; Old Dominion; Rascal Flatts; Zac Brown Band	**Brothers Osborne**; Dan + Shay; Florida Georgia Line; LoCash; Maddie & Tae
Single of the Year	Song of the Year
**"Blue Ain't Your Color" — Keith Urban**; "Better Man" — Little Big Town; "Body Like a Back Road" — Sam Hunt; "Dirt on My Boots" — Jon Pardi; "Tin Man" — Miranda Lambert	**"Better Man" — Taylor Swift**; "Blue Ain't Your Color" — Clint Lagerberg, Hillary Lindsey, Steven Lee Olsen; "Body Like a Back Road" — Zach Crowell, Sam Hunt, Shane McAnally, Josh Osborne; "Dirt on My Boots" — Rhett Akins, Jesse Frasure, Ashley Gorley; "Tin Man" — Jack Ingram, Miranda Lambert, Jon Randall
New Artist of the Year	Musician of the Year
**Jon Pardi**; Lauren Alaina; Luke Combs; Old Dominion; Brett Young	**Mac McAnally, Guitar**; Jerry Douglas, Dobro; Paul Franklin, Steel Guitar; Dann Huff, Guitar; Derek Wells, Guitar
Music Video of the Year	Musical Event of the Year
**"It Ain't My Fault" — Brothers Osborne; (Dir. Wes Edwards and Ryan Silver)**; "Better Man" — Little Big Town; (Dir. Becky Fluke and Reid Long); "Blue Ain't Your Color" — Keith Urban; (Dir. Carter Smith); "Craving You" — Thomas Rhett feat. Maren Morris; (Dir. TK McKamy); "Vice" — Miranda Lambert; (Dir. Trey Fanjoy)	**"Funny How Time Slips Away" — Willie Nelson and Glen Campbell**; "Craving You" — Thomas Rhett and Maren Morris; "Kill a Word" — Eric Church and Rhiannon Giddens; "Setting the World on Fire" — Kenny Chesney and P!nk; "Speak to a Girl" — Tim McGraw and Faith Hill

=== Special Recognition Awards ===
The CMA Special Recognition Award recipients were announced on 4 April 2017.

Award	Recipient
International Country Broadcaster Award	Bob Harris
Jo Walker-Meador International Award	Rob Potts
Jeff Walker Global Country Artist Award	The Shires
International Artist Achievement Award	Carrie Underwood
Wesley Rose International Media Achievement Award	Richard Wootton

== Performers ==
Performer(s)	Song(s)
Eric Church; Lady Antebellum; Darius Rucker; Keith Urban; Brooks & Dunn; Reba McEntire; Little Big Town; Thomas Rhett; Garth Brooks; Luke Bryan; Kelsea Ballerini; Tim McGraw; Faith Hill	Tribute to the Victims of the 2017 Las Vegas shooting "Amazing Grace" "Hold My Hand"
Thomas Rhett	"Unforgettable"
Dierks Bentley; Rascal Flatts; Eddie Montgomery	Tribute to Troy Gentry "My Town"
Kelsea Ballerini; Reba McEntire	"Legends"
Luke Bryan	"Light It Up"
Miranda Lambert	"To Learn Her"
Garth Brooks	"Ask Me How I Know"
Brothers Osborne	Tribute to Don Williams "It Ain't My Fault" "Tulsa Time"
Tim McGraw; Faith Hill	"The Rest of Our Life"
P!nk	"Barbies"
Old Dominion	"No Such Thing as a Broken Heart"
Little Big Town; Jimmy Webb	Tribute to Glen Campbell "Wichita Lineman"
Chris Stapleton	"Broken Halos"
Maren Morris; Niall Horan	"I Could Use a Love Song" "Seeing Blind"
Carrie Underwood	In Memorium "Softly and Tenderly"
Brad Paisley; Kane Brown	"Heaven South"
Jon Pardi	"Dirt on My Boots"
Dan + Shay; Lauren Alaina	"Get Together"
Keith Urban	"Female"
Eric Church; Joanna Cotten; The McCrary Sisters	"Chattanooga Lucy"
Alan Jackson	"Chasin' That Neon Rainbow" "Don't Rock The Jukebox"

== Presenters ==
Presenter(s)	Award
Brittany Snow and Ruby Rose	Single of the Year
Bobby Bones, Karlie Kloss, Brett Young and Luke Combs	Song of the Year
Joanna Garcia-Swisher and Jason Ritter	New Artist of the Year
Tyler Perry	Album of the Year
Sugarland	Vocal Duo of the Year
Brett Eldredge, Dustin Lynch and Lea Michele	Vocal Group of the Year
Michelle Monaghan and Jimmie Johnson	Female Vocalist of the Year
Trisha Yearwood	Male Vocalist of the Year
Reba McEntire	Entertainer of the Year

== Critical reception ==
The 51st Annual CMA Awards received 14.29 million viewers, the highest ratings since 2014 (which received 16.1 million. Among adults 18–49, the show received a 3.2 rating, up from the 2.9 rating of the previous year.

The ceremony was noted for its parody of political subject matter in awards shows, specifically in the opening monologue by Brad Paisley and Carrie Underwood, who told jokes referencing both Hillary Clinton and Donald Trump. Paisley also performed a parody song about Trump's tweeting habits to the tune of Underwood's hit "Before He Cheats."

Underwood's performance during the in memoriam segment, in which she broke down crying, received acclaim, with many citing it as one of the best and most moving and emotional performances of the night. People.com referred to the performance as "heartbreaking," before describing how Underwood took to the stage to honor country music legends (such as Don Williams, Glen Campbell, Troy Gentry, and Jo Walker-Meador) and the 58 victims of the Las Vegas shooting. In addition, ET called Underwood's performance "beautiful" and "gorgeous," mentioning a statement made by Paisley at the opening of the show about coming together in the face of tragedy.

Garth Brooks, who won the prestigious Entertainer of the Year award, was heavily criticized for lip-syncing during his performance. Of his decision, Brooks stated that "we made a game-time call on whether to sing to a track or lip-sync and we decided to lip-sync it. My voice just isn't going anywhere, and we wanted to represent country music as best we can."
