= Young Money (disambiguation) =

Young Money Entertainment is an American record label and supergroup.

Young Money may also refer to:

- Young Money: Rise of an Empire, 2014 album by Young Money Entertainment
- Young Money (magazine), an American financial magazine for young adults

== See also ==
- Yung Money, a nickname of American racing driver Kyle Larson
