= Crazy Ex-Girlfriend (disambiguation) =

Crazy Ex-Girlfriend is an American television sitcom starring Rachel Bloom

Crazy Ex-Girlfriend may also refer to:

- Crazy Ex-Girlfriend (album) by Miranda Lambert
  - "Crazy Ex-Girlfriend" (song) by Miranda Lambert from the album of the same name
- "Crazy Ex-Girlfriend Theme", theme song for the Crazy Ex-Girlfriend sitcom

== See also ==
- My Crazy Ex, LMN television series
