= It All Comes Out in the Wash =

Single by Miranda Lambert

from the album Wildcard
- Released: July 18, 2019
- Genre: Country; pop
- Length: 3:35
- Label: RCA Nashville
- Songwriters: Miranda Lambert; Hillary Lindsey; Lori McKenna; Liz Rose
- Producer: Jay Joyce

Miranda Lambert singles chronology
"Drowns the Whiskey" (2018)	"It All Comes Out in the Wash" (2019)	"Bluebird" (2019)

"It All Comes Out in the Wash" is a song co-written and recorded by American country music artist Miranda Lambert. It was released on July 18, 2019, as the lead-off single from Lambert's seventh studio album Wildcard. The album was released on November 1, 2019.

== Composition ==
Lambert wrote the song with a songwriting collective known as the "Love Junkies," which is composed of Hillary Lindsey, Lori McKenna, and Liz Rose. She described the writing process for the song as "fun" and that the hook was inspired by an idiom often used by her mom and grandma ("it will all come out in the wash") that she felt described getting "over the hump" after her last record which took her through a lot of personal trials and tribulations: "I think that it's got some sarcasm to it, but it's very honest. I haven't had a single out in a long time, and I'm just ready to have new music. I'm in a new phase of my life and ready to have new music out there that represents that," she explained. "This one just felt perfect as far as the vibe of it. It’s fun and lighthearted and I'm really excited about it."

It was produced by Jay Joyce, marking the first time Lambert has worked with the producer.

"Locomotive", another song Lambert co-wrote with Ashley Monroe and K.S. Rhoads and first previewed on the CMA Music Festival in June 2019, was also released alongside the single.

== Critical reception ==
The song was nominated for Best Country Song at the 62nd Annual Grammy Awards.

== Chart performance ==
"It All Comes Out in the Wash" debuted at number 19 on the Billboard Country Airplay chart and number 36 on the Billboard Hot Country Songs chart, for the chart dated July 27, 2019. It is her best opening on the former chart since "Vice" started at number 18 in July 2016. It debuted on the Hot 100 at number 70 for the week dated November 16, 2019. It has sold 43,000 copies in the United States as of November 2019.

== Music video ==
The music video premiered on August 29, 2019, and was directed by Trey Fanjoy. In it, Lambert and her friends are shown mudding and then taking their vehicles to the car wash, which she is also shown performing at with her band.

== Charts ==
=== Weekly charts ===
Chart (2019)	Peak position
Canada Country (Billboard)	10
US Billboard Hot 100	70
US Country Airplay (Billboard)	14
US Hot Country Songs (Billboard)	12

=== Year-end charts ===
Chart (2019)	Position
US Country Airplay (Billboard)	59
US Hot Country Songs (Billboard)	68

== Certifications ==
Region	Certification	Certified units/sales
Canada (Music Canada)	Gold	40,000^{‡}
United States (RIAA)	Gold	500,000^{‡}
^{‡} Sales+streaming figures based on certification alone.
