= Bluebird (Miranda Lambert song) =

Single by Miranda Lambert

from the album Wildcard
- Released: December 9, 2019
- Genre: Country
- Length: 3:30
- Label: RCA Nashville
- Songwriter(s): Miranda Lambert; Luke Dick; Natalie Hemby
- Producer(s): Jay Joyce

Miranda Lambert singles chronology
"It All Comes Out in the Wash" (2019)	"Bluebird" (2019)	"Settling Down" (2020)

"Bluebird" is a song co-written and recorded by American country music artist Miranda Lambert. It was released on December 9, 2019, as the second single from Lambert's seventh studio album Wildcard. The album was released on November 1, 2019. "Bluebird" won the CMA Award for Video of the Year and was nominated for Single and Song of the Year at the 54th Annual Country Music Association Awards. It was also nominated for Best Country Solo Performance and Best Country Song at the 63rd Annual Grammy Awards.

== Composition ==
Lambert wrote the song with Luke Dick and Natalie Hemby just three days after she quietly married Brendan McLoughlin, and described the song as "special," saying that "It's got this hope to it. It's got a darkness too, though, but it's also hopeful. Life is going to give you lemons, period. If there wasn't problems then we wouldn't appreciate the great days, but going through those things and overcoming problems—whatever they are—makes us strong and appreciate the sun. You know, it's like ten straight days of rain and then the sun comes out and you're like, 'I forgot how much I loved it.' Since we wrote 'Bluebird,' I've been seeing bluebirds everywhere. And the bluebirds have been there, but I never saw them like I see them now. It kinda reminds me to open my eyes to what's around me." It was inspired by the Charles Bukowski poem of the same name, which begins "there’s a bluebird in my heart that wants to get out." The parent album's title was lifted from a lyric in the song, which was inspired by a wildcard tattoo Lambert had recently got on her arm memorializing a lyric from "Easy From Now On", an Emmylou Harris song that the singer previously covered on her 2007 album, Crazy Ex-Girlfriend.

"Bluebird" was first released in August 2019 as the third promotional single from the album. An acoustic version of the song was also released on June 12, 2020.

== Music video ==
The music video for "Bluebird" was directed by Trey Fanjoy and premiered on March 20, 2020. In it, Lambert is shown performing the song on a swing while inside of a giant birdcage as spectators watch from their seats. Clips of a caged bluebird in front of an open window are interspersed with these scenes, and at the end of the video, the bluebird is shown flying away while Lambert is seen leaving her own cage and walking away down an urban alleyway. The video was shot at a nightclub in New York City over the course of eight hours, and featured Lambert wearing a bedazzled feather dress and gloves with blue rhinestone eyeshadow, while the spectators recalled the "era of flappers and the confident chanteuse" (an ode to the 1920s).

== Chart performance ==
"Bluebird" debuted at number 38 on the Billboard Hot Country Songs chart dated November 11, 2019, ahead of its release as a single. It debuted at number 53 on the Billboard Country Airplay chart dated December 28, 2019, and debuted at number 81 on the Billboard Hot 100 chart dated April 17, 2020. It since became a number one hit on the Billboard Country Airplay chart dated August 1, 2020, becoming Lambert's first as a solo artist since "Over You" in May 2012. In between, she had two number one singles as a featured artist on Keith Urban's "We Were Us" in 2013 and Jason Aldean's "Drowns the Whiskey" in 2018. It also reached number one on the Canadian Country chart for the chart dated June 26, 2020.

"Bluebird" has sold 26,000 copies in the United States as of March 2020.

== Charts ==
=== Weekly charts ===
Chart (2019–2020)	Peak position
Canada (Canadian Hot 100)	46
Canada Country (Billboard)	1
US Billboard Hot 100	26
US Country Airplay (Billboard)	1
US Hot Country Songs (Billboard)	3
US Rolling Stone Top 100	33

=== Year-end charts ===
Chart (2020)	Position
US Billboard Hot 100	91
US Country Airplay (Billboard)	36
US Hot Country Songs (Billboard)	15

== Certifications ==
Region	Certification	Certified units/sales
Canada (Music Canada)	2× Platinum	160,000^{‡}
United States (RIAA)	2× Platinum	2,000,000^{‡}
^{‡} Sales+streaming figures based on certification alone.
