= Settling Down =

Single by Miranda Lambert

from the album Wildcard
- Released: September 21, 2020
- Genre: Country
- Length: 3:17
- Label: RCA Nashville
- Songwriters: Miranda Lambert; Luke Dick; Natalie Hemby
- Producer: Jay Joyce

Miranda Lambert singles chronology
"Bluebird" (2019)	"Settling Down" (2020)	"Drunk (And I Don't Wanna Go Home)" (2021)

"Settling Down" is a song co-written and recorded by American country music artist Miranda Lambert. It was released on September 21, 2020, as the third single from Lambert's seventh studio album Wildcard.

Lambert performed the song live at the 54th Annual Country Music Association Awards.

== Composition ==
Lambert wrote the song with Luke Dick and Natalie Hemby, the same team that wrote her previous single, "Bluebird", and it was produced by Jay Joyce. Lambert developed the song's hook while having an earlier conversation with her bus driver about her relationship with Brendan McLoughlin ("am I settling up or settling down?") and brought that to the writing session, and together they wrote a song "full of paradoxes" that highlighted the whirlwind life of an artist touring the country while also desiring the homestead lifestyle following Lambert's fresh marriage to McLoughlin. Lambert also noted that McLoughlin was one of the song's most ardent supporters and lobbied for its release as a single: "And you know, he was out there with us on the road and he was hearing, when I was hanging with radio, that people were responding to it."

== Music video ==
The music video for "Settling Down" was directed by Trey Fanjoy and premiered on October 21, 2020. It was shot on location at Lambert's farm outside Nashville, Tennessee and features her husband, Brendan McLoughlin, marking the first time Lambert has had a love interest in one of her music videos: "I'm like, 'You're cute, you're here, and you're free.' It was fun; he did such a great job... and our little dog is in it, and our ponies. It's at my magical-happy place an hour away from Nashville."

== Chart performance ==
"Settling Down" debuted at number 45 on the Billboard Country Airplay chart dated October 3, 2020, and at number 49 on the Billboard Hot Country Songs chart dated October 17, 2020.

== Charts ==
=== Weekly charts ===
Weekly chart performance for "Settling Down"
Chart (2020–2021)	Peak position
Canada Hot 100 (Billboard)	51
Canada Country (Billboard)	1
US Billboard Hot 100	41
US Country Airplay (Billboard)	6
US Hot Country Songs (Billboard)	6

=== Year-end charts ===
Year-end chart performance for "Settling Down"
Chart (2021)	Position
US Country Airplay (Billboard)	15
US Hot Country Songs (Billboard)	14

== Certifications ==
Certifications for "Settling Down"
Region	Certification	Certified units/sales
Canada (Music Canada)	Platinum	80,000^{‡}
United States (RIAA)	Platinum	1,000,000^{‡}
^{‡} Sales+streaming figures based on certification alone.
