= More Like Her =

2008 single by Miranda Lambert

Single by Miranda Lambert

from the album Crazy Ex-Girlfriend
- Released: September 1, 2008
- Recorded: 2007
- Genre: Country
- Length: 3:28
- Label: Columbia Nashville
- Songwriter(s): Miranda Lambert
- Producer(s): Frank Liddell; Mike Wrucke

Miranda Lambert singles chronology
"Gunpowder & Lead" (2008)	"More Like Her" (2008)	"Dead Flowers" (2009)

Music video
- "More Like Her" on YouTube

"More Like Her" is a song written and recorded by American country music artist Miranda Lambert. It was released in September 2008 as the fourth single from her album Crazy Ex-Girlfriend. It is the only single from the album to be written solely by Lambert.

== Content ==
"More Like Her" is a love ballad in the key of B major backed primarily by an acoustic guitar. In it, the narrator describes the details of a woman whose lover returns to his old girlfriend, who takes him back despite his cheating. The woman realizes she "should've been more like her" to keep him, but she could not, because she does not forgive him ("I should have never let you lie").

== Critical reception ==
Brady Vercher of Engine 145 gave the song a "thumbs-up" and said, "Lambert sounds great and sells the song with her performance, making for a worthwhile release." He also considered the song different from mainstream country music, saying "[I]t’s nice to see something sent to radio for its artistic quality rather than its commercial viability."

In November 2008, Lambert appeared on the CMA Awards to perform "More Like Her". The performance was well received by music critics. LA Times gave her the only A rating of the night's performances, saying that, "With just Lambert and her guitar, she was pure late-night resignation as she opened the song, turning bitterness into pure reflection." Chet Flippo of CMT.com spoke positively of the performance. "For me, it was watching Miranda Lambert sing an original song with her own guitar accompaniment. [...] That song contained what I wasn't hearing a lot of on the CMA Awards show: substance. And style. And personality. And grit." Country Universe stated that Miranda Lambert's performance (along with Carrie Underwood's "Just a Dream") was the best performance of the night. "With understated brilliance, Lambert shifted gears by offering her Texas twang on the stripped-down ballad."

"More Like Her" was nominated for Female Video of the Year in the 2009 CMT Music Awards.

== Music video ==
A music video was released along with the song, which was directed by Randee St. Nicholas. In the video, Lambert receives a pair of yellow canaries in a bird cage which she carries up the stairs. She sings in front of the stairs and in the attic of her apartment. Throughout the video, there are intimate close-ups of Lambert performing the song with an acoustic guitar. In the video, several positions of Lambert are shown at once, fading in an out to show a lapse in time. Behind her, people can be seen moving furniture into the attic. The video comes to an end when Lambert enters an elevator and the door closes.

== Charts ==
A week before its release, "More Like Her" debuted at number 54 on the U.S. Billboard Hot Country Songs charts. On its twenty-second week on the charts, the song entered the Top 20 and debuted at number 99 on the U.S. Billboard Hot 100. After 27 weeks on the country charts, it peaked at number 17 in March 2009.

Chart (2008–2009)	Peak position
Canada Country (Billboard)	34
US Billboard Hot 100	90
US Hot Country Songs (Billboard)	17
