= Me and Charlie Talking =

Single by Miranda Lambert

from the album Kerosene
- Released: October 4, 2004
- Genre: Country
- Length: 4:12 (album version); 3:34 (radio edit)
- Label: Epic
- Songwriters: Miranda Lambert; Rick Lambert; Heather Little
- Producers: Frank Liddell; Mike Wrucke

Miranda Lambert singles chronology
"Somebody Else" (2002)	"Me and Charlie Talking" (2004)	"Bring Me Down" (2005)

"Me and Charlie Talking" is the major-label debut single by American country music artist Miranda Lambert, written by Lambert, her father Rick Lambert, and Heather Little. The record was produced by Frank Liddell and Mike Wrucke. It was released on October 4, 2004, as the lead single to her debut studio album Kerosene (2005) by Epic Nashville.

Despite breaking the record for the highest debut by a female artist's debut single, it only peaked at number 27 on the US Hot Country Songs chart.

== Commercial performance ==
"Me and Charlie Talking" debuted on the US Billboard Hot Country Songs chart (then titled "Hot Country Singles & Tracks") the week of October 23, 2004 at number 42, becoming the "Hot Shot Debut" of the week; this led Lambert to breaking the record for the highest debut by a female artist's debut single during the BDS era, surpassing the number 48 debut that label-mate Gretchen Wilson had with her song "Redneck Woman". Despite this, the song would only rise to a minor 27 the week of March 19, 2005, where it stayed for two weeks; it stayed 23 weeks in total on the chart.

== Music video ==
A music video was released for the song, directed by Trey Fanjoy. It premiered to both Country Music Television (CMT) and Great American Country (GAC) the week of October 24, 2004.

== Charts ==
Chart (2004–2005)	Peak position
US Hot Country Songs (Billboard)	27
