= New Strings =

Single by Miranda Lambert

from the album Kerosene
- Released: April 22, 2006
- Genre: Country
- Length: 3:50
- Label: Epic
- Songwriter: Miranda Lambert
- Producers: Frank Liddell, Mike Wrucke

Miranda Lambert singles chronology
"Kerosene" (2005)	"New Strings" (2006)	"Crazy Ex-Girlfriend" (2006)

"New Strings" is a song recorded by American country music artist Miranda Lambert. It was released on April 22, 2006, as the fourth and final single from her debut album, Kerosene. The song reached a peak of number 25 on the Billboard Hot Country Songs chart.

== Content ==
Lambert wrote the song herself, and it was produced by Frank Liddell and Mike Wrucke.

== Music video ==
A music video was released for the song, directed by Trey Fanjoy. It shows color footage of Lambert singing and playing a guitar in a field, lying on a blanket in the grass, and standing by a farm truck. Interspersed with this is black-and-white footage of Lambert on tour, in a radio interview, and performing at Joe's Bar in Chicago. The color footage was filmed in a suburb of Nashville.

== Charts ==
Chart (2006)	Peak position
US Bubbling Under Hot 100 (Billboard)	25
US Hot Country Songs (Billboard)	25
