= Famous in a Small Town =

Single by Miranda Lambert

from the album Crazy Ex-Girlfriend
- Released: April 2, 2007
- Recorded: 2006
- Genre: Country
- Length: 4:05
- Label: Columbia Nashville
- Songwriter(s): Miranda Lambert; Travis Howard
- Producer(s): Frank Liddell; Mike Wrucke

Miranda Lambert singles chronology
"Crazy Ex-Girlfriend" (2006)	"Famous in a Small Town" (2007)	"Gunpowder & Lead" (2008)

Music video
- "Famous in a Small Town" on YouTube

"Famous in a Small Town" is a song co-written and recorded by American country music artist Miranda Lambert. It was released in April 2007 as the second single from her album Crazy Ex-Girlfriend. It was Lambert's second Top 20 hit on the U.S. Billboard Hot Country Songs chart. It was nominated for the Grammy Award for Best Female Country Vocal Performance in 2008. The song was written by Lambert and Travis Howard.

The song was ranked number 40 on Engine 145's 50 Best Country Songs of 2007.

== Content ==
"Famous in a Small Town" has a moderately fast tempo in the key of B major. The main chord pattern is B_{sus}2-E_{sus}2/B-F♯/B. The narrator describes the simplicities of living in a small town, where everyone knows each other and no one needs to have their face in a magazine to be famous. Thus, everybody dies "famous in a small town."

== Music video ==
A music video was released for the song, directed by Trey Fanjoy. The video features Lambert singing in a town square in Lebanon, Tennessee mixed with scenes from Shelbyville, Tennessee. The video's depicts people's everyday lives in a small town, including a diner and high school; all of these scenes are shot in black and white. One major part in the video is every person/event seen is taken as a magazine picture (ending with Lambert herself getting one taken). Lambert is also seen playing her guitar and singing on a red carpet with camera flashes, neon signs, and her band, to contrast with the small town image, and is shot in color rather than black and white. This is her second video to be shot in both black and white and in color, after "New Strings" in 2006. In Lambert's own words, "Famous in a Small Town is really, (really) how it was growing up in Lindale."

The music video reached the top spot of CMT's Top Twenty Countdown for the week of August 16, 2007.

== Chart performance ==
"Famous in a Small Town" debuted at number 54 on the U.S. Billboard Hot Country Songs chart for the week of April 7, 2007. After 33 weeks on the chart, it peaked at number 14 on November 17, 2007.

=== Weekly charts ===
Chart (2007)	Peak position
Canada Country (Billboard)	32
US Billboard Hot 100	87
US Hot Country Songs (Billboard)	14

=== Year-end charts ===
Chart (2007)	Peak position
US Hot Country Songs (Billboard)	57

== Certifications ==
Region	Certification	Certified units/sales
United States (RIAA)	Gold	500,000^{‡}
^{‡} Sales+streaming figures based on certification alone.
