= The Steel Woods =

American country and rock band

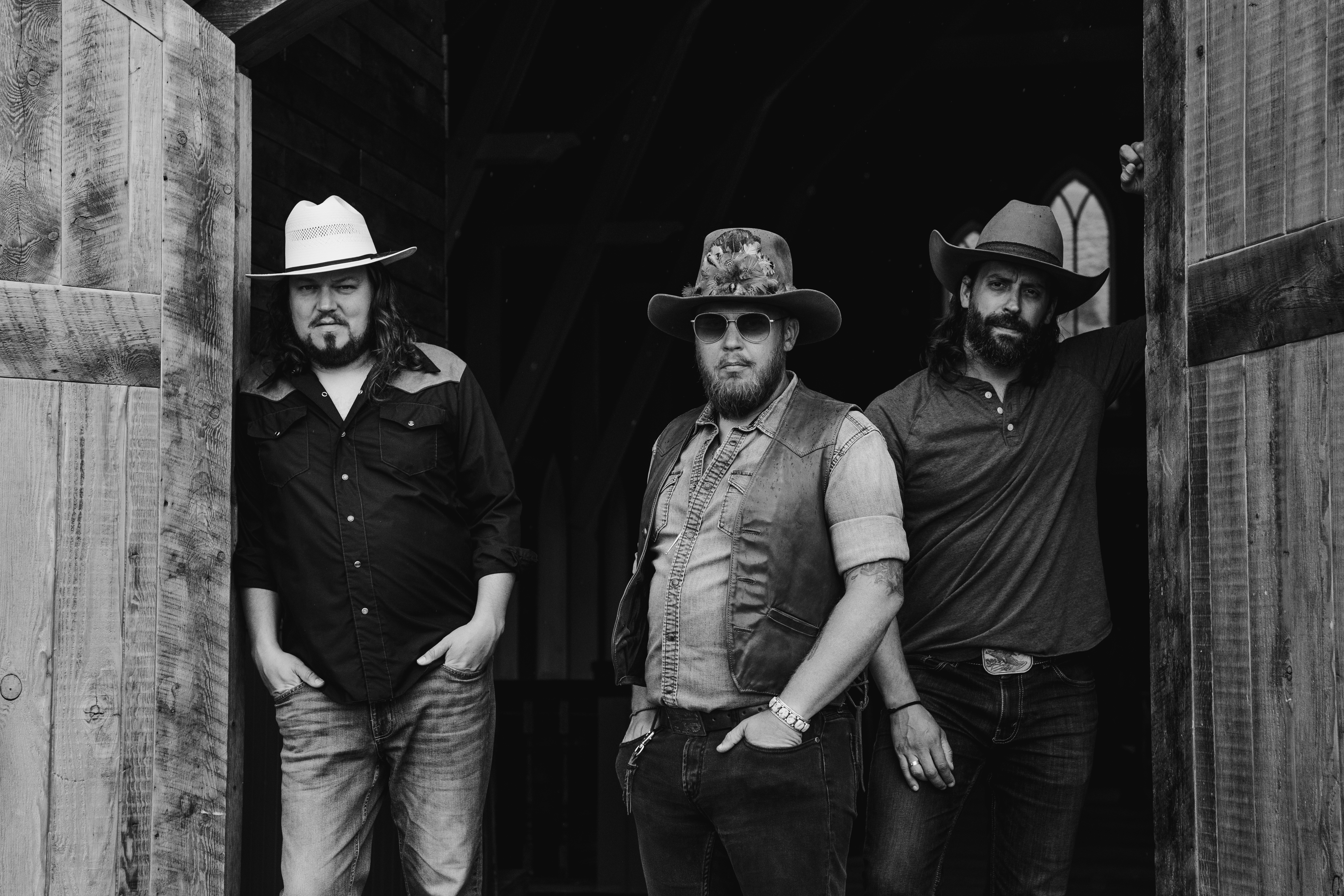
- Wes Bayliss, Tyler Powers and Johnny Stanton

Background information
- Origin: Nashville, Tennessee, United States
- Genres: Southern rock; country rock; outlaw country
- Years active: 2016–2024
- Labels: Woods Music; Thirty Tigers
- Members: Wes Bayliss; Johnny Stanton; Tyler Powers
- Past members: Jason "Rowdy" Cope; Jay Tooke
- Website: thesteelwoods.com

The Steel Woods were an American country and rock band. from Nashville, Tennessee. Their debut album, Straw in the Wind, was released in 2017.

The band has cited influences such as Willie Nelson, Waylon Jennings and Led Zeppelin, and have toured in support of artists such as Lynyrd Skynyrd, Dwight Yoakam, Jamey Johnson, Cody Jinks, Miranda Lambert, and Blackberry Smoke.

Founding member and guitarist Jason "Rowdy" Cope died on January 16, 2021.

== History ==
The Steel Woods were cofounded by Wes Bayliss and Jason "Rowdy" Cope. Cope was the creative lead of the band as well as its lead guitarist, songwriter and co-producer, while Bayliss is a multi-instrumentalist, lead singer and co-producer.

Bayliss grew up in Woodland, Alabama, playing music in his family's gospel band and learned to play harmonica, mandolin, and guitar. In 2007, he moved to Mobile, Alabama, where he experimented further on different instruments. Cope began to learn guitar at the age of 11 in his hometown of Asheville, North Carolina. He later worked as a Los Angeles-based musician before moving to Nashville in 2007 and joined Jamey Johnson's band. In his nine years with Johnson, Cope co-wrote "Can't Cash My Checks" and helped Johnson make the Grammy-nominated "That Lonesome Song" (2008) and "The Guitar Song" (2010).

In the early days of The Steel Woods, Bayliss and Cope spent a lot of time fishing and writing what would eventually evolve into the bands first studio album, Straw in the Wind (2017) released on Thirty Tigers/Woods Music. The album featured a guest vocal appearance by Lindi Ortega, and Brent Cobb also contributed as a songwriter. On June 10, 2017, it reached number 42 on the Billboard Independent Albums chart.

In the subsequent years, the band toured with fellow Southern rock artists Cody Johnson, Cody Jinks, Whiskey Myers, and Blackberry Smoke as well as inspirations such as Lynyrd Skynyrd and Miranda Lambert.

They recorded their second album, Old News, in Asheville at the site of an old church during a break in their touring schedule. The album was released on January 18, 2019.

Cope died in January 2021. The band's third album, All of Your Stones, was released in May 2021.

On March 28, 2024, Wes Bayliss announced that after the completion of a final United States tour throughout 2024, The Steel Woods would disband, citing personal reasons to end the band and cancelling a scheduled autumn 2024 UK and European tour with fellow Southern rockers Blackberry Smoke.

== Personnel ==
- Wes Bayliss – guitar and vocals
- Jason Cope – guitar (d. 2021)
- Johnny Stanton – bassist
- Tyler Powers – guitar (joined 2021)
- Isaac Senty - drummer

== Discography ==
Albums

- Straw in the Wind (2017)
- Old News (2019)
- All of Your Stones (2021)
- On Your Time (2023)
- The Lexington Tapes (2026)

== See also ==
- List of country music performers
