= Kerosene (album) =

Studio album by Miranda Lambert
- Released: March 15, 2005
- Recorded: 2004
- Genre: Country
- Length: 46:26
- Label: Epic Nashville
- Producer: Frank Liddell; Mike Wrucke

Miranda Lambert chronology
Miranda Lambert (2001)	Kerosene (2005)	Crazy Ex-Girlfriend (2007)

Singles from Kerosene
- 1. "Me and Charlie Talking" Released: October 4, 2004; 2. "Bring Me Down" Released: April 16, 2005; 3. "Kerosene" Released: September 27, 2005; 4. "New Strings" Released: April 22, 2006

Kerosene is the debut studio album by American country music artist Miranda Lambert. The album was released on March 15, 2005, by Epic Nashville Records and was produced by Frank Liddell and Mike Wrucke. After placing third in the television competition Nashville Star in 2003, Lambert signed with Epic Nashville in 2004. The album spawned four top 40 Billboard Country Chart singles; however, only the title track was a major hit, peaking at number 15.

== Background ==
Kerosene was recorded in Nashville, Tennessee in 2004 and consists of twelve tracks. Eleven of the twelve tracks were either entirely written or co-written by Lambert herself. After appearing with Lambert as a contestant on Nashville Star, Travis Howard co-wrote the tracks "I Can't Be Bothered", "Bring Me Down", and "Mama, I'm Alright". Lambert hand-picked her producers for the album, choosing Frank Liddell because she was pleased with his work on music by Jack Ingram and Chris Knight. In addition, she also chose Mike Wrucke. The music's tone is set to a "love gone wrong" theme, however Lambert said that she did not draw this inspiration from her personal life. Lambert stated that she just "...loved a lot" and is "...one of those people who love very deeply when I do." Lambert gave songwriting co-credit for the title track to Alternative country artist, Steve Earle, after others noted the similarity to his 1996 single "I Feel Alright". Lambert said in an interview that she had unconsciously copied the melody and structure of the song.

Entertainment Weekly's Alanna Nash felt that the album's sound evoked the genres of honky-tonk and country rock. John Metzger of Music Box stated that the single "Me and Charlie Talking" had an "infectious folk-pop" sound, while he considered "Greyhound Bound for Nowhere" to be "a somber retrospective."

In 2025, Lambert released a 20th anniversary edition of the album on digital platforms, including the previously unreleased track "I Don't Love Here Anymore", along with the standard album being pressed on vinyl for the first time.

== Critical reception ==
Professional ratings
Review scores
Source	Rating
AllMusic	4/5 stars
Entertainment Weekly	B+
Music Box	3/5 stars

The album received generally positive reviews from music critics. Entertainment Weekly music critic, Alanna Nash gave Kerosene a B+ rating stating, "A Nashville Star finalist and only 20 when she recorded this spunky set of honky-tonk, country-rock, and Sheryl Crow-style ballads last year, Lambert's got Dixie Chicks-like potential; Her vocals evoke Natalie Maines, and she clearly knows how to write a killer tune. Nash also praised Lambert's choice of material, calling the songs "torch stuff". Jon Metzger of Music Box gave Kerosene three out of five stars. Metzger criticized the fact that Lambert came to fame because of her success on Nashville Star, but he found her to be more memorable than other talent contest winners. Metzger proved his point by saying, "Without a doubt, her fame was derived from a carefully orchestrated marketing campaign, but standing in sharp contrast to almost all of her counterparts, the 21-year-old Texan actually has talent. Not only does Lambert pen her own material, but she also has the wherewithal to deliver it with a strikingly potent level of down-to-earth sincerity."

Stephen Thomas Erlewine of AllMusic gave Kerosene a more favorable review, giving the album four out of five stars. Erlewine drew the album's similarities to the production of the material by country artist Gretchen Wilson, a style which he called "stylized redneck raunch." Erlewine also said that Kerosene lost the "gonzo humor" Big & Rich had produced on Wilson's Here for the Party. He did find however that Lambert was unique in her own musical style, concluding by stating, "Against all odds, this a rarity in modern mainstream country: a piece of product that's friendly, tuneful, sharper, and more genuine than it initially seems. Maybe Miranda needed a show like Nashville Star to jump-start her career, but the show gave her the opportunity to make this thoroughly winning debut."

== Chart performance ==
Kerosene's lead single titled "Me and Charlie Talking" was released in October 2004, becoming the highest-debuting single in the week of October 16, debuting at number 42 on the Billboard Hot Country Songs chart, but only peaking at number 27. Kerosene was officially released March 15, 2005, selling 40,000 copies within its first week and debuting at number 1 on the Billboard Top Country Albums chart, as well as number 18 on the Billboard 200. In April, the song "Bring Me Down" was released from the album, but the song only reached number 32 on the Billboard Country Chart. In October 2005, the title track was spawned as the third single, becoming the highest-debuting single of the week on October 8, 2005. The song became the album's first significant hit, reaching number 15 on the Billboard Country Chart in early 2006. "New Strings" was released as the album's final single in April 2006, peaking within the Top 25.

In December 2005, Kerosene was certified gold by the Recording Industry Association of America, however after the success of the title track, the album eventually was certified platinum in March 2007 and has sold 1,121,528 copies as of January 28, 2012.

== Track listing ==
No.	Title	Writer(s)	Length
1.	"Kerosene"	Miranda Lambert; Steve Earle	3:05
2.	"What About Georgia"	M. Lambert	3:25
3.	"Greyhound Bound for Nowhere"	M. Lambert; Rick Lambert	4:23
4.	"New Strings"	M. Lambert	3:50
5.	"I Can't Be Bothered"	Travis Howard	3:20
6.	"Bring Me Down"	M. Lambert; Howard	4:15
7.	"Me and Charlie Talking"	M. Lambert; R. Lambert; Heather Little	4:12
8.	"I Wanna Die"	M. Lambert; Scotty Wray	3:46
9.	"Love Is Looking for You"	M. Lambert	3:52
10.	"Mama, I'm Alright"	M. Lambert; Howard	4:07
11.	"There's a Wall"	M. Lambert	4:15
12.	"Love Your Memory"	M. Lambert	3:47
Total length:			46:26

20th anniversary edition
No.	Title	Writer(s)	Length
13.	"I Don't Love Here Anymore"	M. Lambert; Little	3:59
Total length:			50:25

== Personnel ==
Musicians

- Richard Bennett – guitar
- Chad Cromwell – drums
- Eric Darken – percussion
- Natalie Hemby – background vocals
- Jim Hoke – utility instruments
- Joey Huffman – keyboards
- Jay Joyce – guitar
- Miranda Lambert – vocals
- Buddy Miller – background vocals
- Russ Pahl – pedal steel guitar
- Mando Saenz – background vocals
- Randy Scruggs – guitar, mandolin
- Hank Singer – fiddle
- Glenn Worf – bass
- Mike Wrucke – banjo, guitar, keyboards, background vocals

Technical personnel

- Courtney Clay – project coordination
- Stephen Marcussen – mastering
- Sylvia Meiler – creative producer
- Sang Park – assistant engineer
- Eric Tonkin – assistant engineer
- Stewart Whitmore – digital editing

== Chart positions ==
=== Weekly charts ===
Chart (2005)	Peak position
US Billboard 200	18
US Top Country Albums (Billboard)	1

=== Year-end charts ===
Chart (2005)	Position
US Top Country Albums (Billboard)	37
Chart (2006)	Position
US Billboard 200	127
US Top Country Albums (Billboard)	26

=== Singles ===
Year	Song	Peak chart positions	
Year	Song	US Country	US
2004	"Me and Charlie Talking"	27	—
2005	"Bring Me Down"	32	—
2005	"Kerosene"	15	61
2006	"New Strings"	25	—
"—" denotes releases that did not chart.

== Certifications ==
Region	Certification
United States (RIAA)	Platinum

== Release history ==
Release dates and formats for Kerosene
Region	Date	Format	Edition	Label	Ref.
Various	March 15, 2005	CD; digital download; streaming	Standard	Epic	
Various	August 30, 2005	DualDisc	Standard	Epic	
Various	March 14, 2025	Digital download; streaming	Expanded	Columbia Nashville Legacy	
Various	April 25, 2025	LP record	Standard	Columbia Nashville Legacy	
