= Dead Flowers (Miranda Lambert song) =

Single by Miranda Lambert

from the album Revolution
- Released: May 4, 2009
- Recorded: 2009
- Genre: Country
- Length: 3:59
- Label: Columbia Nashville
- Songwriter(s): Miranda Lambert
- Producer(s): Frank Liddell; Mike Wrucke

Miranda Lambert singles chronology
"More Like Her" (2008)	"Dead Flowers" (2009)	"White Liar" (2009)

Music video
- "Dead Flowers" on YouTube

"Dead Flowers" is a song written and recorded by American country music artist Miranda Lambert. On May 4, 2009, the song was released as the lead-off single from her album Revolution. Additionally, the song was included on an EP release also titled Dead Flowers.

Lambert debuted "Dead Flowers" at the 44th annual Academy of Country Music Awards on April 5, 2009.

== Content ==
The song is a ballad in the key of E major about a love gone bad, driven by acoustic guitar and percussion. The narrator is saddened by the images of dead flowers and Christmas lights that are burned out, that symbolize their current relationship.

Lambert got the inspiration to write the song from a personal experience. "I had some flowers that I got for Valentines Day in a vase on the kitchen table. I was going on the road so I had to throw them in the yard. They were just laying there and it was a really sad image. The song came to me right away and was one of those ones that kinda wrote itself."

== Critical reception ==
The song was well received with critics, garnering numerous positive reviews.

The Slant Magazine spoke positively of the song. "The track gives her plenty of material to work with and just as many reasons to be optimistic about the quality of that upcoming record. Offering a surfeit of dense, loaded phrases and sharply drawn images, the song hits with devastating accuracy because of how well Lambert sustains its central conceit." Roughstock reviewer Matt Bjorke praised the song for showing a different side to Lambert. "The lyrics are smart, the melody is moody and the vocal performance is just stunning. This is the kind of song Miranda's always had in her and while I love her rock 'tude, "Dead Flowers" shows us a softer, more tuneful side of Miranda Lambert that wasn't ever really shown to radio fans before." Frequency magazine, who gave the song five-out-of-five stars, felt that it "may be the best song Miranda has ever done. From the lyrics to the vocal delivery to the production, everything is just gorgeous. If the rest of the songs on her album are of the same quality, she might very well win the coveted ACM Album of the Year again."

== Music video ==
The music video for the song was directed by Randee St. Nicholas, and was released to CMT on July 16, 2009. The video begins with Lambert sitting at a table with a vase of dead flowers. She gets up and walks into the kitchen, where Christmas lights are lying, strung across the counter. Lambert is then shown performing in the living room with fans blowing on her hair, while a man is watching from the sofa beside her. After that, she is shown outside the house, both in and in front of her car, with more holiday lights hung up on her house.

"Dead Flowers" debuted at number 17 on CMT's Top Twenty Countdown for the week of July 31, 2009. The song spent only two weeks on the countdown, peaking at number 15. However, the video debuted at number 10 on GAC's Top 20 countdown; it has since reached number 5.

== Charts ==
"Dead Flowers" debuted at number 59 on the Billboard Hot Country Songs chart dated for May 2, 2009, and entered the Top 40 in its third week. It fell below Top 40 on the week of May 23, and re-entered the Top 40 at number 39 on the week of June 20. The song spent 16 weeks on the chart, and reached a peak of number 37 in July 2009.

Chart (2009)	Peak position
US Hot Country Songs (Billboard)	37

== Awards and nominations ==
Award	Category	Result
52nd Grammy Awards	Best Female Country Vocal Performance	Nominated

== Dead Flowers EP ==
Dead Flowers EP

EP by Miranda Lambert
- Released: September 8, 2009
- Genre: Country
- Length: 15:24
- Label: Columbia Nashville
- Producer: Frank Liddell; Mike Wrucke

Miranda Lambert chronology
Crazy Ex-Girlfriend (2007)	Dead Flowers EP (2009)	Revolution (2009)

Dead Flowers is the first extended play by American country singer-songwriter Miranda Lambert, released on September 8, 2009 through Columbia Nashville. The EP, titled after her song of the same name, was released exclusively through Best Buy to help promote her upcoming album, Revolution (2009), for which "Dead Flowers" (the song) serves as the lead single. It features "Dead Flowers", as well as three other songs previously released as bonus tracks on various versions of her 2007 album, Crazy Ex-Girlfriend.

=== Track listing ===
No.	Title	Writer(s)	Length
1.	"Dead Flowers"	Miranda Lambert	3:59
2.	"Take It Out on Me"	M. Lambert, Travis Howard, Dennis Matkosky	3:29
3.	"I Just Really Miss You"	M. Lambert, Keith Gattis, Howard	5:24
4.	"Nobody's Used to Be"	M. Lambert, Rick Lambert	2:48
