= Bring Me Down (Miranda Lambert song) =

Single by Miranda Lambert

from the album Kerosene
- Released: April 16, 2005
- Genre: Country
- Length: 4:15
- Label: Epic
- Songwriters: Miranda Lambert, Travis Howard
- Producers: Frank Liddell, Mike Wrucke

Miranda Lambert singles chronology
"Me and Charlie Talking" (2004)	"Bring Me Down" (2005)	"Kerosene" (2005)

"Bring Me Down" is a song recorded by American country music artist Miranda Lambert. It was released on April 16, 2005, as the second single from her debut album, Kerosene. The song reached a peak of number 32 on the Billboard Hot Country Songs chart.

== Content ==
Lambert co-wrote the song with Travis Howard, and it was produced by Frank Liddell and Mike Wrucke.

== Music video ==
A music video was released for the song, directed by Kristin Barlowe.

== Chart performance ==
Chart (2005)	Peak position
US Hot Country Songs (Billboard)	32
