= Gunpowder & Lead =

Single by Miranda Lambert

from the album Crazy Ex-Girlfriend
- Released: January 14, 2008
- Recorded: 2007
- Genre: Country rock
- Length: 3:11
- Label: Columbia Nashville
- Songwriters: Miranda Lambert; Heather Little
- Producers: Frank Liddell; Mike Wrucke

Miranda Lambert singles chronology
| "Famous in a Small Town" (2007) | "Gunpowder & Lead" (2008) | "More Like Her" (2008) |

"Gunpowder & Lead" is a song co-written and recorded by American country music artist Miranda Lambert. It was released in January 2008 as the third single from her album Crazy Ex-Girlfriend. The album's third single, it became Lambert's first Top 10 hit on the Billboard Hot Country Songs in July 2008. With over 1,000,000 digital downloads, "Gunpowder & Lead" was certified Platinum by the RIAA on December 3, 2010. The song was written by Lambert and Heather Little.

The song was made available as downloadable content for the game Rock Band on December 16, 2008.

== Content ==
The song is a moderate up-tempo song in the key of G backed by resonator guitar. Its lyrics focus on the narrator, who tells of her plans to shoot her abusive husband once he is let out of jail.

The radio edit omits sound effects which are heard on the album version: door slowly creaking open at the beginning, and the sound of a gunshot at the end with the sound of the door slowly creaking closed.

The song has been compared to "Goodbye Earl" by the Dixie Chicks and "Independence Day" by Martina McBride, both of which feature abused wives killing their husbands as well. According to Lambert, the song's storyline was inspired by a point in her life when her parents would take abuse victims into their home, and she had to share her bedroom with a mother and daughter.

== Critical reception ==
The song received a "thumbs up" from Engine 145 reviewer Matt C. He compared the song 's theme of female liberation to "Goodbye Earl" and "Independence Day", and although he said that it was also thematically similar to Lambert's previous single "Kerosene", he considered it "too well crafted to be considered purely derivative." Kevin J. Coyne of Country Universe was also positive, and gave the song an A+ rating. "The stroke of brilliance was focusing the song completely around the moment of tension: her waiting at home with a loaded shotgun, ready to defend herself after he makes bail and comes back home to finish the fight."

"Gunpowder & Lead" was named the 90th best song of 2007 by Pitchfork. The song was deemed the 9th best single of 2008 by Rough Trade. Billboard and Paste ranked the song number three and number four, respectively, on their lists of the 10 greatest Miranda Lambert songs.

== Music video ==
The music video used for "Gunpowder & Lead" is a live performance from the CMA Music Festival, in Nashville, TN.

== Charts ==
"Gunpowder & Lead" debuted at number 51 on the U.S. Billboard Hot Country Songs chart for the chart week of January 19, 2008. The song became Lambert's first Top 10 hit; it peaked at number 7 on August 16, 2008. It has sold over 2,207,000 in the US as of November 2015.

=== Weekly charts ===
| Chart (2008) | Peak position |
|---|---|
| Canada Country (Billboard) | 19 |
| US Billboard Hot 100 | 52 |
| US Hot Country Songs (Billboard) | 7 |

=== Year-end charts ===
| Chart (2008) | Peak position |
|---|---|
| US Hot Country Songs (Billboard) | 41 |

== Certifications ==
| Region | Certification | Certified units/sales |
|---|---|---|
| United States (RIAA) | 3× Platinum | 2,207,000 |
| United States (RIAA) Mastertone | Gold | 500,000^{*} |
^{*} Sales figures based on certification alone.

== Covers ==
American Idol finalists Lauren Alaina, Haley Reinhart, Skylar Laine and Jessica Meuse performed this song on their respective seasons.

Alaina and Reinhart performed the song as a duet on the Top 4 results show of season 10, and Laine performed this song during the theme of "Their Personal Idols" on the show's eleventh season.

Liz Davis performed the song on her knockout round on season 3 of The Voice.
