= Young Money (magazine) =

American bi-monthly magazine, 1999–2009

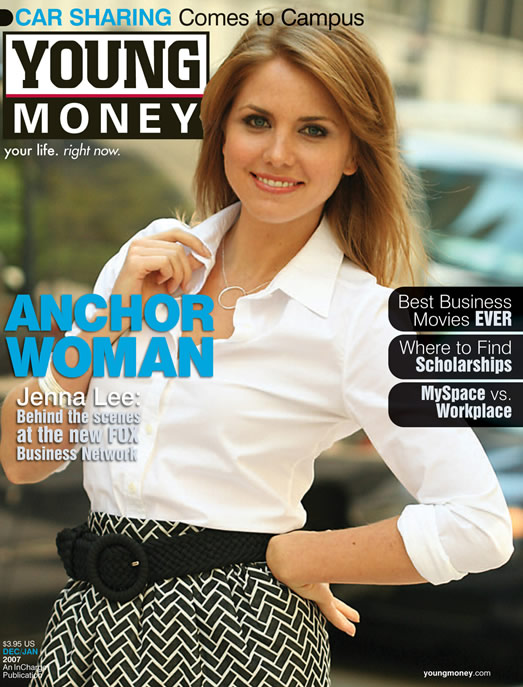
- Financial journalist Jenna Lee on the cover of Young Money for January 2007
- Categories: Financial information
- Frequency: Bi-monthly
- Publisher: Todd Romer
- First issue: 1999; 27 years ago
- Final issue: 2009; 17 years ago
- Country: United States
- Website: youngmoneymag.com

Young Money was a bi-monthly publication that specializes in financial information for young adults. It sought to "change the way young adults earn, manage, invest and spend money."

== History ==
Young Money was launched in 1999 and specifically focused on money management, entrepreneurship, careers, investing, technology, travel, entertainment and automotive topics. The magazine was headquartered in Orlando, Florida.

It ceased publication in 2009.

=== Financial advice ===
Young Money magazine offered financial advice for young adults. USA Today noted that Young Money "shifted its focus to the college-aged market" in 2002 The Washington Post described Young Money as "a personal finance magazine for adolescents". Todd Romer, the publisher of Young Money, was quoted in the Post article stating "More teens today are becoming aware of the significant advantage of starting to manage their money now while they're young".

=== Featuring young entrepreneurs ===
Young Money magazine often profiled the business experiences of young entrepreneurs. In 2005 it profiled the founders of theplacefinder.com, a website that provides detailed information about housing for college students.

Additionally in 2005, it featured the founders of workscited4u.com, a website that automatically generates works cited pages. The article reported on the experiences of the site's founders in setting up the website and maintaining it.

== Reviews ==
A number of other periodicals have reviewed Young Money, including the Washington Post, Orlando Sentinel, USA Today, and The Gazette.
