= The Weight of These Wings =

Studio album by Miranda Lambert
- Released: November 18, 2016
- Recorded: 2015–16
- Studios: The Casino, Nashville, Tennessee
- Genre: Alternative country
- Length: 94:01
- Labels: RCA Nashville; Vanner
- Producers: Frank Liddell; Eric Masse; Glenn Worf

Miranda Lambert chronology
Platinum (2014)	The Weight of These Wings (2016)	Wildcard (2019)

Singles from The Weight of These Wings
- 1. "Vice" Released: July 18, 2016; 2. "We Should Be Friends" Released: December 12, 2016; 3. "Tin Man" Released: April 3, 2017; 4. "Keeper of the Flame" Released: April 30, 2018

The Weight of These Wings is the sixth studio album by American country music artist Miranda Lambert. It was released on November 18, 2016, via RCA Records Nashville. The album consists of two discs, with Disc 1 titled The Nerve, and Disc 2 titled The Heart. The album debuted at No. 1 on the Billboard Country Albums chart and No. 3 on the all-genre US Billboard 200 chart, and has been certified Platinum by the Recording Industry Association of America (RIAA). In addition to winning Album of the Year at the 2017 ACM Awards, it is considered by several music publications as one of the best albums of the year. In 2020, the album was ranked at 480 on Rolling Stone's 500 Greatest Albums of All Time list.

== Background and music ==
In an August 2016 interview with Billboard, Lambert stated she had been working on the album for a year, which included writing and recording. She admitted she was nervous about her new music since she had mostly stayed quiet while writing it. Songwriter Luke Dick was one of the musicians who worked on the album. He co-wrote "Highway Vagabond" with Natalie Hemby and Shane McAnally. He found the line "I want to go somewhere nobody knows; and I want to know somewhere that nobody goes" while waiting at a deli and not willing to mix with other people. This became a road song with the word "vagabond" at the center, with a production sounding like country Siouxsie and the Banshees.

The album's content is about her divorce with Blake Shelton and her subsequent relationship with Anderson East.

== Release and promotion ==
The album was released on November 18, 2016, through RCA Records Nashville.

In support of her album, Lambert started the Highway Vagabond Tour. It started on January 26, 2017, in Evansville, Indiana and concluded on October 21, 2017, in White Springs, Florida. A rehearsal show occurred on January 24, 2017, two days before the tour started, at Joe's Bar in Chicago. Lambert first announced the tour in October 2016. Old Dominion and Aubrie Sellers served as opening acts. The tour marks Lambert's first solo tour dates in Europe (after previously playing shows in the UK as part of the C2C: Country to Country festival in 2016).

=== Singles ===
"Vice" was released as the album's lead single on July 18, 2016. In its first week it sold 64,000 copies and debuted (and peaked) at number 2 on the Hot Country Songs chart. It ultimately reached a peak of number 11 on the Country Airplay chart. As of March 2017, the song has sold 508,000 copies in the United States.

"We Should Be Friends" was released as the second single on December 12, 2016. It was a Top 30 hit on the Hot Country Songs and Country Airplay charts. "Tin Man" was released as the third single on April 3, 2017, immediately following Lambert's acoustic performance of the song on 52nd Academy of Country Music Awards. It peaked in the Top 20 of the Hot Country Songs chart, and the Top 30 of the Country Airplay chart.

"Keeper of the Flame" was released as the fourth single on April 16, 2018.

== Critical reception ==
Professional ratings
Aggregate scores
Source	Rating
AnyDecentMusic?	7.8/10
Metacritic	81/100
Review scores
Source	Rating
AllMusic	5/5 stars
Entertainment Weekly	A−
Exclaim!	7/10
The Guardian	4/5 stars
Newsday	A
Pitchfork	7.8/10
PopMatters	8/10
Rolling Stone	4/5 stars
Spectrum Culture	4/5 stars
Vice	B+

The Weight of These Wings received widespread acclaim from music critics. At Metacritic, which assigns a normalized rating out of 100 to reviews from mainstream critics, the album has an average score of 81 out of 100, which indicates "universal acclaim" based on 11 reviews. Stephen Thomas Erlewine from AllMusic rated the album at five out of five and in his review stated "It may have mainstream songs, but The Weight of These Wings isn't produced like a country-pop album, so it demands attention and rewards close listening." Paul Grein of HITS Daily Double predicted the album to be in contention for Album of the Year at the 60th Annual Grammy Awards.

The Weight of These Wings won the award for Album of the Year at the 2017 ACM Awards. It marks Lambert's fifth consecutive album to win the award, a record for any artist or group.

=== Accolades ===
Publication	Rank	List
AllMusic	N/A	Best Albums of 2016
American Songwriter	28	Top 50 Albums of 2016
Billboard	14	50 Best Albums of 2016
Entertainment Weekly	16	The 50 Best Albums of 2016
Entertainment Weekly	3	The Best Country Albums of 2016
Noisey	52	The 100 Best Albums of 2016
NPR	9	50 Best Albums of 2016
Rolling Stone	2	40 Best Country Albums of 2016
Rolling Stone	16	50 Best Albums of 2016
SPIN	40	The 50 Best Albums of 2016
Stereogum	1	The 20 Best Country Albums of 2016
Uproxx	1	The 20 Best Country Albums of 2016
Variety	4	The 10 Best Albums of 2016

== Awards ==
Year	Association	Category	Result
2017	ACM Awards	Album of the Year	Won
2017	CMA Awards	Album of the Year	Nominated

== Track listing ==
All tracks produced by Frank Liddell, Eric Masse, and Glenn Worf.

Disc 1 – The Nerve
No.	Title	Writer(s)	Length
1.	"Runnin' Just in Case"	Miranda Lambert; Gwen Sebastian	4:33
2.	"Highway Vagabond"	Natalie Hemby; Luke Dick; Shane McAnally	3:53
3.	"Ugly Lights"	Lambert; Hemby; Liz Rose	3:01
4.	"You Wouldn't Know Me"	Shake Russell	3:19
5.	"We Should Be Friends"	Lambert	2:50
6.	"Pink Sunglasses"	Rodney Clawson; Dick; Hemby	4:06
7.	"Getaway Driver"	Lambert; Hemby; Anderson East	3:53
8.	"Vice"	Lambert; McAnally; Josh Osborne	4:00
9.	"Smoking Jacket"	Lambert; Hemby; Lucie Silvas	4:54
10.	"Pushin' Time"	Lambert; Hemby; Foy Vance	3:33
11.	"Covered Wagon"	Danny O'Keefe	4:08
12.	"Use My Heart"	Lambert; Ashley Monroe; Waylon Payne	3:50
Total length:			46:00

Disc 2 – The Heart
No.	Title	Writer(s)	Length
1.	"Tin Man"	Lambert; Jack Ingram; Jon Randall	4:19
2.	"Good Ol' Days"	Lambert; Brent Cobb; Adam Hood	3:18
3.	"Things That Break"	Lambert; Hemby; Jessi Alexander	3:47
4.	"For the Birds"	Lambert; Aaron Raitere	3:46
5.	"Well-Rested"	Lambert; Raitere; East	4:39
6.	"Tomboy"	Lambert; Raitere; Hemby	4:01
7.	"To Learn Her"	Lambert; Monroe; Payne	3:47
8.	"Keeper of the Flame"	Lambert; Hemby; Rose	3:59
9.	"Bad Boy"	Lambert; Mando Saenz	4:40
10.	"Six Degrees of Separation"	Lambert; Hemby; Nicolle Galyon	3:09
11.	"Dear Old Sun"	Lambert; Sebastian; Terri Jo Box	4:56
12.	"I've Got Wheels"	Lambert; Sebastian; Scotty Wray	3:40
Total length:			48:01

== Personnel ==
Credits adapted from AllMusic.
Vocals

- Chris Coleman – background vocals
- Madi Diaz – background vocals
- Anderson East – backing vocals on "Getaway Driver" and "Pushin' Time"
- Miranda Lambert – lead vocals
- Frank Liddell – background vocals
- Annalise Liddell – background vocals
- Eric Masse – background vocals
- Aaron Raitiere – background vocals
- Luke Reynolds – background vocals
- Frank Rische – background vocals
- Lillie Mae Rische – background vocals
- Gwen Sebastian – background vocals
- Lucie Silvas – background vocals
- Glenn Worf – background vocals

Musicians

- Chris Carmichael – strings, string arrangements
- Matt Chamberlain – drums, percussion
- Chris Coleman – electric guitar, drums, violin, percussion, synthesizer, trumpet
- Spencer Cullum – steel guitar, lap steel guitar
- Louis Newman – timpani
- Lex Price – bass guitar, acoustic guitar
- Luke Reynolds – acoustic guitar, electric guitar, piano, synthesizer
- Frank Carter Rische – acoustic guitar, electric guitar
- Hargus "Pig" Robbins – piano
- Glenn Worf – bass guitar, electric guitar, piano
- Scotty Wray – electric guitar

Production and imagery

- Daniela Federici – photography
- Tracy Baskette Fleaner – creative direction and design
- Becky Fluke – photography
- Brittany Hamlin – production coordination
- Tiffany Gifford – styling
- Johnny Iavoy – photography
- Moani Lee – make-up
- Eric Masse – production
- Annalise Liddell – engineering assistance
- Frank Liddell – production
- Gavin Lurssen – mastering
- Chris Taylor – assistant, recording, mixing
- Glenn Worf – production

== Commercial performance ==
The Weight of These Wings debuted at number one on the Billboard Country Albums chart and number three on the all-genre US Billboard 200 chart, moving 133,000 equivalent album units in its first week of release. It sold 122,000 copies, with the remainder of its unit total reflecting the album's streaming activity and track sales. It is Lambert's fifth straight album to debut in the top ten of the Billboard 200, following Platinum (number one, 2014), Four the Record (number three, 2011), Revolution (number eight, 2009) and Crazy Ex-Girlfriend (number six, 2007). In its second week of release, the album moved 36,000 units and fell to number nine. Following the 52nd Academy of Country Music Awards on April 2, 2017, where Lambert won multiple awards and performed "Tin Man", the album moved 31,000 units, including 23,000 in pure sales, and jumped from number 192 to number 12 on the Billboard 200 chart. The album was certified Platinum on July 10, 2017, and it has sold 438,600 copies in the US as of August 2018.

== Charts ==
=== Weekly charts ===
Chart (2016)	Peak position
Australian Albums (ARIA)	26
Canadian Albums (Billboard)	5
New Zealand Heatseeker Albums (RMNZ)	4
Scottish Albums (Official Charts)	39
UK Albums (Official Charts)	70
UK Country Albums (Official Charts)	3
US Billboard 200	3
US Top Country Albums (Billboard)	1

=== Year-end charts ===
Chart (2016)	Position
Australian Country Albums (ARIA)	72

Chart (2017)	Position
Australian Country Albums (ARIA)	90
US Billboard 200	44
US Top Country Albums (Billboard)	4

Chart (2018)	Position
US Top Country Albums (Billboard)	51

== Certifications ==
Region	Certification	Certified units/sales
Canada (Music Canada)	Gold	40,000^{‡}
United States (RIAA)	Platinum	438,600
^{‡} Sales+streaming figures based on certification alone.

== Release history ==
Source: Amazon.com

Region	Date	Format(s)	Label
United States	November 18, 2016	CD; digital download; vinyl	RCA Nashville
