= We Should Be Friends =

Single by Miranda Lambert

from the album The Weight of These Wings
- Released: December 12, 2016
- Genre: Country
- Length: 2:50
- Label: RCA Nashville
- Songwriter(s): Miranda Lambert
- Producer(s): Frank Liddell; Eric Masse; Glenn Worf

Miranda Lambert singles chronology
"Vice" (2016)	"We Should Be Friends" (2016)	"Tin Man" (2017)

Music videos
- "We Should Be Friends" on YouTube

"We Should Be Friends" is a song written and recorded by American country music artist Miranda Lambert. It was released to radio on December 12, 2016, as the second single from Lambert's sixth studio album The Weight of These Wings (2016).

== Music video ==
The music video was directed by Trey Fanjoy and premiered on February 9, 2017. In it, Lambert is shown in a beauty salon getting a makeover and interacting with other patrons (which include songwriters Natalie Hemby and Waylon Payne) who are getting their hair curled with beer cans and gossiping. The video was filmed in Watertown, Tennessee and draws conceptual similarities to Legally Blonde.

== Charts ==
=== Weekly charts ===
Chart (2016–2017)	Peak position
Canada Country (Billboard)	20
US Bubbling Under Hot 100 Singles (Billboard)	6
US Country Airplay (Billboard)	26
US Hot Country Songs (Billboard)	25

=== Year-end charts ===
Chart (2017)	Position
US Hot Country Songs (Billboard)	80
