= Wildcard (Miranda Lambert album) =

Studio album by Miranda Lambert
- Released: November 1, 2019
- Genre: Country rock
- Length: 48:53
- Labels: RCA Nashville; Vanner
- Producer: Jay Joyce

Miranda Lambert chronology
The Weight of These Wings (2016)	Wildcard (2019)	The Marfa Tapes (2021)

Singles from Wildcard
- 1. "It All Comes Out in the Wash" Released: July 18, 2019; 2. "Bluebird" Released: December 9, 2019; 3. "Settling Down" Released: September 21, 2020

Professional ratings
Aggregate scores
Source	Rating
Metacritic	82/100
Review scores
Source	Rating
Pitchfork	7.4/10
Rolling Stone	4.5/5 stars
Slant Magazine	3/5 stars

Wildcard is the seventh studio album by American country music singer Miranda Lambert. It was released on November 1, 2019, via RCA Records Nashville. The album was produced by Jay Joyce, marking the first time Lambert has worked with the producer. It features the singles "It All Comes Out in the Wash", "Bluebird", and "Settling Down".

The album received a Grammy Award for Best Country Album and was nominated for the Country Music Association Award for Album of the Year.

== Content ==
"It All Comes Out in the Wash" was released on July 18, 2019, as its lead single. Five other tracks—"Locomotive", "Mess with My Head", "Bluebird", "Way Too Pretty for Prison", and "Pretty Bitchin'"—were also previewed ahead of the album. "Way Too Pretty for Prison" was inspired by Little Big Town's Karen Fairchild and was recorded as a collaboration with Maren Morris. Lambert has co-writing credits on all 14 tracks.

== Promotion ==
In support of the album's release, Miranda Lambert announced a 27-city North American tour, the Wildcard Tour which commenced on January 16, 2020, in Tupelo, Mississippi at the BancorpSouth Arena and was scheduled to conclude on May 9, 2020, in Montreal, Quebec at the Bell Centre. Supporting acts included Cody Johnson, LANCO, Randy Rogers Band, Parker McCollum and an unknown act to be announced.

== Commercial performance ==
The album debuted at number 4 on the US Billboard's 200 and on the Top Country Albums chart at number 1 with 53,000, album-equivalent units, including 44,000 pure album sales. It is her seventh number one country album. As of March 2020, it has sold 110,300 copies, with 170,000 units consumed in total in the United States. The album sold an additional 250,000 album units in 2020, per Rolling Stone's top 200 albums of the year.

== Track listing ==
Adapted from Rolling Stone.

No.	Title	Writer(s)	Length
1.	"White Trash"	Miranda Lambert; Luke Dick; Natalie Hemby; Laura Veltz	3:10
2.	"Mess with My Head"	Lambert; Dick; Hemby	2:33
3.	"It All Comes Out in the Wash"	Lambert; Hillary Lindsey; Lori McKenna; Liz Rose	3:35
4.	"Settling Down"	Lambert; Dick; Hemby	3:17
5.	"Holy Water"	Lambert; Brent Cobb; Mike Harris; Scotch Taylor	3:14
6.	"Way Too Pretty for Prison" (with Maren Morris)	Lambert; Lindsey; McKenna; Rose	3:14
7.	"Locomotive"	Lambert; Ashley Monroe; K.S. Rhoads	3:14
8.	"Bluebird"	Lambert; Dick; Hemby	3:30
9.	"How Dare You Love"	Lambert; Jamie Kinney; Monroe	3:37
10.	"Fire Escape"	Lambert; Lindsey; McKenna; Rose	3:49
11.	"Pretty Bitchin'"	Lambert; Dick; Hemby; Jon Randall	3:32
12.	"Tequila Does"	Lambert; Jack Ingram; Randall	4:01
13.	"Track Record"	Lambert; Lindsey; McKenna; Rose	3:19
14.	"Dark Bars"	Lambert; Rose	4:48
Total length:			48:53

== Personnel ==
Credit by AllMusic

- Luke Dick - electric guitar
- Dan Dugmore - dobro, acoustic guitar, lap steel guitar, mandolin, pedal steel guitar
- Fred Eltringham - djembe, drums, gang vocals on "Way Too Pretty for Prison"
- Jason Hall - gang vocals on "Way Too Pretty for Prison"
- Jaxon Hargrove - gang vocals on "Way Too Pretty for Prison"
- Natalie Hemby - background vocals
- Jay Joyce - bongos, clavinet, drums, Farfisa organ, Fender Rhodes, 6-string acoustic guitar, 12-string acoustic guitar, acoustic guitar, electric guitar, ganjo, Hammond B-3 organ, keyboards, mandolin, percussion, programming, shaker, tambourine, gang vocals on "Way Too Pretty for Prison"
- Joel King - bass guitar
- Miranda Lambert - lead vocals, background vocals, gang vocals on "Way Too Pretty for Prison"
- Hillary Lindsey - acoustic guitar, background vocals
- Jimmy Mansfield - gang vocals on "Way Too Pretty for Prison"
- The McCrary Sisters - background vocals
- Rob McNelley - acoustic guitar, electric guitar, gang vocals on "Way Too Pretty for Prison"
- Travis Meadows - harmonica
- Ashley Monroe - background vocals
- Maren Morris - duet vocals on "Way Too Pretty for Prison"

== Charts ==
=== Weekly charts ===
Chart (2019)	Peak position
Australian Albums (ARIA)	19
Australian Country Albums (ARIA)	2
Canadian Albums (Billboard)	12
Scottish Albums (Official Charts)	18
Swiss Albums (Schweizer Hitparade)	92
UK Albums (Official Charts)	57
UK Country Albums (Official Charts)	1
US Billboard 200	4
US Top Country Albums (Billboard)	1

=== Year-end charts ===
Chart (2019)	Position
US Top Country Albums (Billboard)	71

Chart (2020)	Position
US Billboard 200	196
US Top Country Albums (Billboard)	16

Chart (2021)	Position
US Top Country Albums (Billboard)	27

== Certifications ==
Region	Certification	Certified units/sales
Canada (Music Canada)	Gold	40,000^{‡}
United States (RIAA)	Gold	500,000^{‡}
^{‡} Sales+streaming figures based on certification alone.
