= Kerosene (song) =

Single by Miranda Lambert

from the album Kerosene
- Released: September 27, 2005
- Recorded: 2005
- Genre: Country, country rock
- Length: 3:05
- Label: Epic
- Songwriters: Miranda Lambert; Steve Earle
- Producers: Frank Liddell; Mike Wrucke

Miranda Lambert singles chronology
"Bring Me Down" (2005)	"Kerosene" (2005)	"New Strings" (2006)

Music video
- "Kerosene" on YouTube

"Kerosene" is a song co-written and recorded by American country music artist Miranda Lambert. It was released in September 2005 as the third single and title-track to her debut album of the same name. It reached number 15 on the Hot Country Songs chart, Lambert's first Top 20 country hit. It also peaked at number 61 on the U.S. Billboard Hot 100. The working title of the song was "Kerosene (Love's Givin' Up on Me)".

The accompanying music video for the song was directed by Trey Fanjoy. The song was Lambert's first to be certified Gold by the RIAA on March 6, 2006. It also gave Lambert her first Grammy nomination for Best Female Country Vocal Performance.

== Content ==
"Kerosene" is an up-tempo song in the key of D major that is backed with electric guitar and harmonica. The narrator, who is being cheated on by her boyfriend, expresses her being through with love; "I'm giving up on love / 'Cause love's giving up on me". Instead of letting him off easy, she takes revenge by burning down his house after soaking it in kerosene fuel to ease the pain.

Although Lambert was technically the sole writer of "Kerosene," she gave co-writer's credit to alt-country singer Steve Earle after others noted a similarity to his song "Feel Alright." She stated in an interview that she had inadvertently duplicated the melody and structure, saying: "I didn't purposefully plagiarize his song -- but unconsciously, I copied it almost exactly. I guess I'd listened to it so much that I just kind of had it in there."

== Music video ==
A music video was released for the song, directed by Trey Fanjoy. In the video, Lambert carries a tin of kerosene, letting it spill out leaving a trail as she walks through the countryside. After she finds her boyfriend cheating on her in a bed in the middle of a road, she lights a match and lets fire to the kerosene. The flame burns all the way back to her boyfriend's house and sets fire to it.

The music video reached the top spot of CMT's Top Twenty Countdown for the week of March 2, 2006. It was also featured on CMT's 100 Greatest Videos, where it was ranked at number 78.

== Critical reception ==
Billboard and Paste ranked the song number nine and number eight, respectively, on their lists of the 10 greatest Miranda Lambert songs.

== Chart performance ==
"Kerosene" debuted at number 50 on the U.S. Billboard Hot Country Songs chart for the week of October 15, 2005. After twenty-two weeks on the chart, it peaked at number 15 on March 11, 2006.

Chart (2005–2006)	Peak position
Canada Country (Radio & Records)	25
US Billboard Hot 100	61
US Hot Country Songs (Billboard)	15

== Certifications ==
Region	Certification	Certified units/sales
United States (RIAA)	Platinum	1,000,000^{‡}
^{‡} Sales+streaming figures based on certification alone.
