= Crazy Ex-Girlfriend (album) =

Studio album by Miranda Lambert
- Released: May 1, 2007
- Genre: Country
- Length: 37:25
- Label: Columbia Nashville
- Producers: Frank Liddell; Mike Wrucke

Miranda Lambert chronology
Kerosene (2005)	Crazy Ex-Girlfriend (2007)	Revolution (2009)

Singles from Crazy Ex-Girlfriend
- 1. "Crazy Ex-Girlfriend" Released: December 26, 2006; 2. "Famous in a Small Town" Released: April 2, 2007; 3. "Gunpowder & Lead" Released: January 14, 2008; 4. "More Like Her" Released: September 1, 2008

Crazy Ex-Girlfriend is the second studio album by American country music artist Miranda Lambert, released May 1, 2007, by Columbia Nashville. It was produced by Frank Liddell and Mike Wrucke.

Crazy Ex-Girlfriend was Lambert's first studio album released under the Columbia Nashville label, as 2005's Kerosene was issued on Epic Nashville Records. The album received high critical acclaim, with critics commenting on Lambert's revengeful material. The album went to number one on the United States' Top Country Albums chart and also reached number 6 on the overall American chart. Out of the album's four singles, three were major hits on the Billboard Hot Country Songs chart between 2007 and 2009. "Gunpowder & Lead", the third single released from the album, became her first Top 10 hit on the country chart in 2008. Other singles spawned from the album were "Famous in a Small Town" and "More Like Her".

In late Spring 2008, Crazy Ex-Girlfriend won the Album of the Year award at the Academy of Country Music Awards.

== Background ==
Crazy Ex-Girlfriend was recorded at three separate studios in Nashville, Tennessee and consisted of eleven tracks. Eight of the album's tracks were entirely written or co-written by Lambert herself. Three additional tracks are cover versions. "Getting Ready" was written by Patty Griffin, and it appears on her 2007 release Children Running Through. "Easy From Now On" (written by Carlene Carter and Susanna Clark) was originally a Top 15 Billboard country hit for Emmylou Harris and appeared on her 1978 album, Quarter Moon in a Ten Cent Town. "Dry Town" was written by Gillian Welch and David Rawlings but would not appear on any of their albums until 2017's Boots No 1: The Official Revival Bootleg. Most of the album's tracks speak of planning revenge on ex lovers. Lambert said she drew inspiration for writing such music because both her parents were private investigators and she was frequently exposed to crime scenes. Frank Liddell and Mike Wrucke were both chosen as producers of the album, since both previously produced her 2005 release, Kerosene.

Most of the album's tracks describe women who seek revenge on their ex lovers. The first track, "Gunpowder & Lead", discusses a woman who plans revenge on an abusive boyfriend by killing him with her shotgun. The album's title track explains how an ex-girlfriend will not let her former lover date other women. The woman walks into the bar where her lover is and creates a scene by committing acts of violence. Other songs have more mellow themes behind them. The third track, "Famous in a Small Town", is drawn from real life experiences and situations when Lambert was younger.

In an interview with Young Money Magazine, Lambert described Crazy Ex-Girlfriend and how it compared with her previous release. Lambert clarified that although most listeners view her as a "badass" singer, other songs on the album also show a more mellow-sounding side of her musical artistry.

"I definitely put more of myself out there on this one. People hear songs like 'Kerosene' and even 'Gunpowder & Lead' from 'Crazy Ex-Girlfriend' and think I’m always that badass, but if you listen to the record and hear songs like 'Desperation' and 'More Like Her', the softer side comes through. And at first I was like, 'Crap, I just said a whole lot about myself and now there's no going back!' but fans and critics have responded so well I guess it was a good thing to do!"

== Critical reception ==
Professional ratings
Aggregate scores
Source	Rating
Metacritic	85/100
Review scores
Source	Rating
AllMusic	5/5 stars
The Boston Phoenix	3.5/4 stars
Entertainment Weekly	A−
MSN Music (Consumer Guide)	A
Paste	4/5 stars
Pitchfork	8.0/10
PopMatters	6/10
Rolling Stone	4/5 stars
Slant Magazine	5/5 stars
Stylus Magazine	A

Crazy Ex-Girlfriend received widespread acclaim from critics. At Metacritic, which assigns a normalized rating out of 100 to reviews from mainstream critics, the album received an average score of 85, based on 15 reviews. Stephen Thomas Erlewine from AllMusic hailed it as one of 2007's best albums, demonstrating Lambert's skills as a singer and a songwriter because of her "wry wit and clear eye for little details, mining the unexpected from such familiar subjects as love and loss and jealously and rage." In Rolling Stone, Robert Christgau said it would likely be the year's best country record and said while Lambert also impressed with her introspective songs, "the violent moments define a little lady who also cites the Rolling Stones' 'Under My Thumb' [on 'Guilty in Here'] and rocks a Patty Griffin cover. Smoking." Jonathan Keefe from Slant Magazine credited her with defying country music's "historically and presently conservative gender politics" on an album that was "brash, insightful, wry, and, above all else, smart". Stylus Magazine critic Josh Love deemed it a coming-of-age record for Lambert, who was self-possessed enough to craft "a persona whose power relies not on values, beliefs, or experiences, but on feints, distance, and masterful command ... Lambert is at a very rarified place right now, turning her songs into vehicles for a persona that transcends background narrative and personal history".

At the end of 2007, Crazy Ex-Girlfriend was ranked the 4th best album of the year by Time. It was voted the 15th best album of the year in the Pazz & Jop, an annual poll of American critics published by The Village Voice. Robert Christgau, the poll's creator, ranked it seventh on his own year-end list. Rolling Stone placed it at number 26 on the magazine's top-albums list for 2007, while ranking the title track at number 28 on its best-songs list. The album also won the Academy of Country Music's "Album of the Year" award in 2008, becoming Lambert's second award from the award association. In 2010, Rhapsody ranked the album number 10 on its "Country’s Best Albums of the Decade" list. Newsweek ranked it number 4 on its "Best Albums of the Decade" list.

== Commercial performance ==
Crazy Ex-Girlfriend was officially released May 3, 2007, debuting at number 1 on the Billboard Top Country Albums and number 6 on the Billboard 200 albums chart, selling 53,000 copies within its first week. It became Lambert's second album to debut at number 1 on Billboard Top Country Albums chart, as Kerosene had also debuted at number 1 in 2005. The album was certified Gold by the Recording Industry Association of America on June 2, 2008 for shipment of over 500,000 copies in the United States. On January 21, 2011, nearly four years after the album's release, Crazy Ex Girlfriend was certified Platinum. As of April 2017, the album has sold 1,573,300 copies in the United States.

Crazy Ex-Girlfriend's title track was first released as the album's lead single on December 26, 2006. The song debuted at number 55 on the Billboard Hot Country Songs chart a week prior to its official release at radio. The song did not become a major hit, only peaking at number 50. In April, the album's third track, "Famous in a Small Town", was released as the second single, debuting at number 54 on the Billboard country chart. The song became the first major hit from the album reaching a peak of number 14 in late 2007. "Gunpowder & Lead" was released as the third single in January 2008. The song became Lambert's first Top 10 hit single on the Billboard country chart, reaching a peak of number 7, while also reaching number 52 on the Billboard Hot 100. "More Like Her" became the album's fourth and final single, peaking at number 17 on the country chart in early 2009. For the week issued December 8, 2012, Crazy Ex-Girlfriend re-entered the Billboard 200 at number 56, almost five years after its release date.

== Track listing ==
No.	Title	Writer(s)	Length
1.	"Gunpowder & Lead"	Miranda Lambert; Heather Little	3:11
2.	"Dry Town"	David Rawlings; Gillian Welch	2:42
3.	"Famous in a Small Town"	Lambert; Travis Howard	4:05
4.	"Crazy Ex-Girlfriend"	Lambert; Howard	3:07
5.	"Love Letters"	Lambert	2:45
6.	"Desperation"	Lambert	3:31
7.	"More Like Her"	Lambert	3:28
8.	"Down"	Lambert; Howard	3:55
9.	"Guilty in Here"	Lambert; Howard	2:43
10.	"Getting Ready"	Patty Griffin	3:21
11.	"Easy From Now On"	Carlene Carter; Susanna Clark	4:37
Total length:			37:25

iTunes Bonus Track
No.	Title	Writer(s)	Length
12.	"Girl Like Me"	Lambert; Little	2:55

Target Bonus Tracks
No.	Title	Writer(s)	Length
12.	"Take It Out on Me"	Lambert; Howard; Dennis Matkosky	3:29
13.	"I Just Really Miss You"	Lambert; Keith Gattis; Howard	5:23

The Target exclusive bonus tracks would later appear on the Dead Flowers EP in 2009.

== Personnel ==
Musicians

- Richard Bennett – guitar
- Chad Cromwell – drums
- Eric Darken – percussion
- Natalie Hemby – background vocals
- Jay Joyce – guitar
- Miranda Lambert – guitar, lead vocals
- Chuck Leavell – keyboards
- Buddy Miller – background vocals
- Russ Pahl – pedal steel guitar
- Randy Scruggs – guitar, mandolin
- Hank Singer – fiddle
- Waddy Wachtel – guitar
- Glenn Worf – bass guitar
- Mike Wrucke – banjo, guitar, background vocals, production, engineering, mixing

Technical personnel

- Tracy Baskette-Fleaner – art direction, design
- Judy Forde Blair – liner notes, creative producer
- Holly Chapman – make-up, hairstylist
- Courtney Gregg – production coordination
- Jack Guy – photography
- Amy Hall – stylist
- Frank Lidell – production
- Stephen Marcussen – mastering
- Sang Park – assistant engineer
- Kevin Presley – quality control
- Eric Tonkin – assistant engineer
- Stewart Whitmore – digital editing

== Charts and certifications ==
=== Weekly charts ===
Chart (2007)	Peak position
US Billboard 200	6
US Top Country Albums (Billboard)	1

=== Year-end charts ===
Chart (2007)	Position
US Top Country Albums (Billboard)	41
Chart (2008)	Position
US Billboard 200	112
US Top Country Albums (Billboard)	22
Chart (2009)	Position
US Top Country Albums (Billboard)	50

=== Certifications ===
Region	Certification	Certified units/sales
United States (RIAA)	2× Platinum	1,573,300

== Release history ==
Region	Date	Format	Edition	Label	Ref.
Various	May 1, 2007	CD; streaming	Standard	Columbia Nashville	
Various	May 1, 2007	Digital download	Digital bonus track	Columbia Nashville	
United States	May 1, 2007	CD	Target bonus track	Columbia Nashville	
