= Tin Man (Miranda Lambert song) =

Single by Miranda Lambert

from the album The Weight of These Wings
- Released: April 3, 2017
- Genre: Country
- Length: 4:19
- Label: RCA Nashville
- Songwriters: Miranda Lambert; Jack Ingram; Jon Randall
- Producers: Frank Liddell; Eric Masse; Glenn Worf

Miranda Lambert singles chronology
"We Should Be Friends" (2016)	"Tin Man" (2017)	"Keeper of the Flame" (2018)

"Tin Man" is a song co-written and recorded by American country music artist Miranda Lambert. It was released to radio on April 3, 2017, as the third single from Lambert's sixth studio album The Weight of These Wings (2016). The song was written by Lambert, Jack Ingram and Jon Randall, with an acoustic version appearing on the trio's 2021 collaborative album The Marfa Tapes.

== Music video ==
The music video was directed by Joe DeMaio recorded live at ACM Awards and premiered on CMT, GAC, and Vevo in May 2017.

== Critical reception ==
Billboard and Paste ranked the song number six and number five, respectively, on their lists of the 10 greatest Miranda Lambert songs.

== Commercial performance ==
"Tin Man" was released to country radio on April 3, 2017, quickly following Lambert's performance of the song at the 52nd Academy of Country Music Awards on April 2, 2017. The song re-entered the Hot Country Songs chart at number 15 and debuted on the Hot 100 chart at number 75. On the Country Airplay chart, it debuted at number 53 and went on to peak at number 22.

As of April 2018, it has sold 386,000 copies in the United States.

== Accolades ==
Year	Association	Category	Result
2017	CMA Awards	Single of the Year	Nominated
2017	CMA Awards	Song of the Year	Nominated
2018	Grammy Awards	Best Country Solo Performance	Nominated
2018	Grammy Awards	Best Country Song	Nominated
2018	ACM Awards	Song of the Year	Won

== Charts and certifications ==
=== Weekly charts ===
Chart (2017)	Peak position
Canada Country (Billboard)	50
US Billboard Hot 100	75
US Country Airplay (Billboard)	22
US Hot Country Songs (Billboard)	15

=== Year-end charts ===
Chart (2017)	Position
US Billboard Hot Country Songs	43

=== Certifications ===
Region	Certification	Certified units/sales
Canada (Music Canada)	Gold	40,000^{‡}
United States (RIAA)	Platinum	1,000,000^{‡}
^{‡} Sales+streaming figures based on certification alone.
