= Vice (Miranda Lambert song) =

- Single art cover

Single by Miranda Lambert

from the album The Weight of These Wings
- Released: July 18, 2016
- Genre: Country; alternative rock
- Length: 3:59
- Label: RCA Nashville
- Songwriter(s): Miranda Lambert; Josh Osborne; Shane McAnally
- Producer(s): Frank Liddell; Eric Masse; Glenn Worf

Miranda Lambert singles chronology
"Smokin' and Drinkin'" (2015)	"Vice" (2016)	"We Should Be Friends" (2016)

Music videos
- "Vice" on YouTube

"Vice" is a song recorded by American country music artist Miranda Lambert. It was released to radio on July 18, 2016, as the lead single from Lambert's sixth studio album The Weight of These Wings (2016). The song was written by Lambert, Josh Osborne and Shane McAnally. "Vice" debuted at number two on the Hot Country Songs chart in August 2016. "Vice" was ranked at number 31 on Rolling Stone's "50 Best Songs of 2016" list.

== Commercial performance ==
In the United States, "Vice" had an opening week sales of 64,000 copies and 14.6 million audience impression, prompting it to debut at number 2 on the Hot Country Songs chart, becoming her highest debuting single on that chart, beating the number five debut of "Somethin' Bad." It also debuted at number 18 on the Country Airplay chart, beating the number 26 debut of "Automatic" as her highest debut on that chart. Concurrently, it debuted at number 47 on the Billboard Hot 100. It ultimately went on to peak at number 11 on the Country Airplay chart.

In Canada, the song debuted at number 35 on Canada Country chart and reached a peak of number 4 and debuted at number 99 on the Canadian Hot 100 and peaked at number 78.

As of March 2017, the song has sold 508,000 copies in the United States.

== Music video ==
The music video was directed by Trey Fanjoy and premiered in September 2016. The video begins surveying a wrecked car which Lambert eventually stumbles out of. She is then shown walking down a country road away from the accident and eventually comes to a small town where she stops in a bar for a drink. She then continues to walk until she comes to a crossroads, where a car similar to the one from the beginning of the video pulls up without a driver behind the wheel. She gets into the backseat of the car and the video ends with it driving away.

== Accolades ==
Year	Association	Category	Result
2017	Grammy Awards	Best Country Solo Performance	Nominated
2017	Grammy Awards	Best Country Song	Nominated
2017	ACM Awards	Video of the Year	Nominated
2017	ACM Awards	Single Record of the Year	Nominated
2017	ACM Awards	Song of the Year	Nominated
2017	CMT Music Awards	Video of the Year	Nominated
2017	CMT Music Awards	Female Video of the Year	Nominated

== Charts ==
=== Weekly charts ===
Chart (2016)	Peak position
Canada (Canadian Hot 100)	78
Canada Country (Billboard)	4
US Billboard Hot 100	47
US Country Airplay (Billboard)	11
US Hot Country Songs (Billboard)	2

=== Year end charts ===
Chart (2016)	Position
US Country Airplay (Billboard)	58
US Hot Country Songs (Billboard)	30

== Certifications ==
Region	Certification	Certified units/sales
Canada (Music Canada)	Gold	40,000^{‡}
United States (RIAA)	2× Platinum	508,000
^{‡} Sales+streaming figures based on certification alone.
