= Wranglers (song) =

2024 single by Miranda Lambert

Single by Miranda Lambert

from the album Postcards from Texas
- Released: May 3, 2024
- Studio: Arlyn, Austin, Texas
- Genre: Country rock
- Length: 3:12 (album version); 2:58 (single version)
- Label: Republic; Big Loud
- Songwriters: Ryan Carpenter; Audra Mae; Evan McKeever
- Producers: Miranda Lambert; Jon Randall

Miranda Lambert singles chronology
"Strange" (2022)	"Wranglers" (2024)	"Run" (2025)

Music video
- "Wranglers" on YouTube

"Wranglers" is a song by American country music singer Miranda Lambert. It was released on May 3, 2024, and went for immediate adds at country radio as the lead single from her ninth solo studio album, Postcards from Texas, her tenth studio album overall. It is her first single since signing a new label partnership with Republic Records and Big Loud.

== Background ==
"Wranglers" was written by Ryan Carpenter, Audra Mae, and Evan McKeever, and Lambert co-produced the track with Jon Randall in Austin, Texas at Arlyn Studios. This marks the second single Lambert cut written by Mae after "Little Red Wagon" for Platinum. Mae also provides backing vocals on the track. Lambert first announced the release of "Wranglers" and posted its cover artwork on April 23, 2024, via her Instagram account.

Described as a "classic stadium-ready anthem", Lambert drew comparisons to her own hit "Gunpowder & Lead", saying that "it's a classic tale of a woman taking her power back. I think we can all identify with the character in this song, because we have all had a time in our life where we needed to find our strength, and also get a little revenge on someone who did us wrong or hurt us. This offers such a cool, raging take on how something like this unravels; I think the songwriters nailed it". The hook of the female empowerment anthem refers to the protagonist setting fire to her exes' belongings, specifically his Wrangler brand jeans.

An extended version of the song was released on May 17, 2024.

== Live performances ==
Lambert debuted "Wranglers" live for the first time at her headlining stint at Stagecoach Festival on April 27, 2024.

== Commercial performance ==
"Wranglers" debuted at number 37 on the Billboard Country Airplay chart week dated May 18, 2024.

== Music video ==
The music video for "Wranglers" premiered on June 13, 2024. Directed by longtime collaborator Trey Fanjoy, it is a visual nod to Lambert's video for her 2005 single "Kerosene", which Fanjoy also directed, with Lambert brandishing a replica can of kerosene and the matchbook from the original video, which Lambert teased ahead of its release on her social media accounts with a throwback post comparing the evolution of her look. In it, Lambert is joined by a group of women to help console a friend following a breakup, before she decides to help her by setting fire to her exes belongings before returning them. The video co-stars Lambert's childhood friend Laci, actresses Elle LaMont (who previously appeared in the music video for "If I Was a Cowboy") and Jessica Stroup, and actor Christopher Backus.

== Charts ==
Weekly chart performance for "Wranglers"
Chart (2024)	Peak position
US Country Airplay (Billboard)	35
US Hot Country Songs (Billboard)	31
