= Run (Miranda Lambert song) =

2025 single by Miranda Lambert

Single by Miranda Lambert

from the album Postcards from Texas
- Released: February 24, 2025
- Studio: Arlyn, Austin, Texas
- Genre: Country
- Length: 2:43
- Label: Republic; Big Loud
- Songwriter: Miranda Lambert
- Producers: Miranda Lambert; Jon Randall

Miranda Lambert singles chronology
"Wranglers" (2024)	"Run" (2025)	"A Song to Sing" (2025)

Music video
- "Run" on YouTube

"Run" is a song by American country music singer Miranda Lambert. It was released on February 24, 2025, as the second single from her tenth studio album, Postcards from Texas.

== Background ==
"Run" is described as a "deeply personal" song for Lambert, and is the only track entirely written by her on Postcards from Texas. Lyrically, the song's narrator expresses realizing a relationship is over long before it officially ends and self-reflecting rather than blaming her partner, which Lambert calls "an admission of human error. It's an apology... but it's also a resolve".

In an interview with Kelleigh Bannen on Today's Country Radio, Lambert revealed that the song was written 10 years prior to its release, but she ultimately wasn't ready to perform it at the time, so it went unreleased. She was encouraged by many in her inner circle — including both her husband, Brendan McLoughlin, and producer, Jon Randall — who had heard the song as a demo for years, to record it for Postcards from Texas. On finally releasing the song, Lambert said: "For my fans that stay with me, I promised myself to tell my real, honest stories and real, honest truth. I promised myself and them that I would do that, and so I can’t back out of that now".

Though it is speculated based on the time of its writing and the lyrical content to be inspired by Lambert's divorce to Blake Shelton, Lambert has not publicly commented on the inspiration for "Run" directly.

== Music video ==
The music video for "Run" premiered on February 20, 2025. Directed by Kate Rentz, the video was filmed at Don Donnelly's D Spur Ranch & Riding Stables in Gold Canyon, Arizona, and features Lambert amidst picturesque desert scenery. Lambert's own horse, Cool, makes an appearance in the video, with Lambert saying: "There is always a sense of freedom when you're on the back of a horse with the wind in your hair, so it felt really significant to have Cool with me in this video. I love horses because they're a way to run to something – or away if you need to. I started riding when I turned 30 and wanted to try more things that scared me. Now horses are such a passion of mine and mounted shooting is a brand-new way to push myself and to chase that feeling of being bravely true to yourself, which is exactly what this song is about."

== Chart performance ==
"Run" debuted at number 58 on the Billboard Country Airplay chart dated March 15, 2025. It reached a peak of number 31 on the chart in May 2025.

== Charts ==
Chart performance for "Run"
Chart (2025)	Peak position
US Country Airplay (Billboard)	31
