= Postcards from Texas =

Studio album by Miranda Lambert
- Released: September 13, 2024
- Studios: Arlyn ((Austin); Blackbird (Nashville); The Insanery (Nashville) (Note: Additional recording); Brent Rader Productions (Nashville); Studio G (Nashville); Jimmy Jam (Nashville); The Mansion (Austin); Human Error (Nashville); Two Black Dogs (Nashville)
- Genre: Country
- Length: 45:24
- Labels: Vanner; Republic; Big Loud
- Producers: Miranda Lambert; Jon Randall

Miranda Lambert chronology
Palomino (2022)	Postcards from Texas (2024)	Crisco (2026)

Singles from Postcards from Texas
- 1. "Wranglers" Released: May 3, 2024; 2. "Run" Released: February 24, 2025

Postcards from Texas is the ninth solo studio album by the American country music singer Miranda Lambert. It was released on September 13, 2024, through a partnership between Republic Records and Big Loud. It includes the singles "Wranglers" and "Run".

== Content ==
Lambert announced the tracklisting for Postcards from Texas on July 24, 2024, via Instagram. Self-described as a musical ode to her home state, Lambert co-produced the album with Jon Randall and recorded it at Arlyn Studios in Austin, Texas. Lambert wrote or co-wrote 10 of the album's 14 tracks. "Santa Fe" features guest vocals from Parker McCollum, and "Living on the Run" was originally recorded by its writer David Allan Coe for his 1976 album, Longhaired Redneck.

"Wranglers" was released as the album's lead single on May 3, 2024. It marked Lambert's first single release since her departure from longtime label home Sony Music Nashville, and subsequently signing a new joint recording deal with Republic Records and Big Loud. She described the move as a "fresh start" and expressed joy in recording a full record in Texas for the first time since her self-titled independent album, released when Lambert was 18.

"Dammit Randy" and "Alimony" were also released as promotional singles ahead of the album. Lambert co-wrote "Dammit Randy" with her husband, Brendan McLoughlin, marking his first songwriting credits. "Alimony" was released alongside the album announcement on July 24, 2024, and inspired by her parents frequently working divorce cases while private investigators in Dallas, Texas. Described as a "shuffle", Lambert co-wrote the song with frequent collaborators Natalie Hemby and Shane McAnally, based around a spin on the phrase "Remember the Alamo". "No Man's Land" was released as the third and final promotional single in August.

"Run" was released on February 24, 2025, as the album's second single to country radio.

== Track listing ==
Postcards from Texas track listing
No.	Title	Writer(s)	Length
1.	"Armadillo"	Aaron Raitiere; Jon Decious; Parker Twomey	2:16
2.	"Dammit Randy"	Miranda Lambert; Brendan McLoughlin; Jon Randall	2:59
3.	"Looking Back on Luckenbach"	Lambert; Shane McAnally; Natalie Hemby	3:15
4.	"Santa Fe" (featuring Parker McCollum)	Lambert; Jesse Frasure; Dean Dillon; Jessie Dillon	3:03
5.	"January Heart"	Brent Cobb; Neil Medley	4:13
6.	"Wranglers" (Extended)	Audra Mae; Evan McKeever; Ryan Carpenter	3:13
7.	"Run"	Lambert	2:43
8.	"Alimony"	Lambert; Hemby; McAnally	3:15
9.	"I Hate Love Songs"	Lambert; Jack Ingram; Randall	3:35
10.	"No Man's Land"	Lambert; Luke Dick	3:43
11.	"Bitch on the Sauce (Just Drunk)"	Lambert; Jaren Johnston	2:38
12.	"Way Too Good at Breaking My Heart"	Lambert; Randall; Frasure; Jenee Fleenor	3:30
13.	"Wildfire"	Lambert; Ingram; Randall	3:31
14.	"Living on the Run"	David Allan Coe; Jimmy L. Howard	3:30
Total length:			45:24

== Personnel ==
Credits are adapted from the album's liner notes.

=== Musicians ===
- Miranda Lambert – vocals (all tracks), background vocals (9)
- Conrad Choucroun – drums (all tracks), percussion (1, 2, 5–12, 14)
- Rachel Loy – bass guitar (all tracks), background vocals (10, 12)
- F. Reid Shippen – percussion (1, 9, 11), programming (11)
- Jedd Hughes – electric guitar (1–3, 5–14), acoustic guitar (1, 4, 9–12, 14), mandolin (7)
- Ethan Ballinger – electric guitar (1, 4, 5, 6, 8, 10, 12, 14), acoustic guitar (1–3, 5–7, 9, 11–14), mandolin (1)
- Bukka Allen – Hammond B3 (1–3, 5, 6, 9–13), Wurlitzer (1), keyboards (2, 7, 8, 10, 12, 14)
- Aaron Raitiere – background vocals (1)
- Jon Randall – acoustic guitar (2, 3, 6, 7, 14), background vocals (2, 14)
- Lloyd Maines – steel guitar (3)
- Wade Bowen – background vocals (3)
- Mike Johnson – pedal steel (4)
- Parker McCollum – guest vocals (4)
- Jimmy Wallace – Hammond B3 (5), Mellotron (7)
- Ashley Monroe – background vocals (5)
- Audra Mae – background vocals (6)
- Natalie Hemby – background vocals (8)
- Sarah Buxton – background vocals (9)
- Spencer Cullum Jr. – pedal steel (10, 12, 14), steel guitar (13)
- Bryan Sutton – acoustic guitar (10)
- Jaren Johnston – background vocals (11)
- Aubrie Sellers – background vocals (13)
- Jessi Alexander – background vocals (14)

=== Technical and creative ===
- Miranda Lambert – production
- Jon Randall – production
- Shani Gandhi – vocal production, digital editing, recording assistance
- F. Reid Shippen – recording, stereo mixing
- Brandon Towles – stereo mixing assistance
- Joseph Holguin – recording assistance
- Pete Lyman – stereo mastering, vinyl mastering
- Daniel Bacigalupi – mastering assistance
- Casey Wood – additional recording, digital editing (1–3, 5–7, 10–12)
- Lloyd Maines – additional recording (3)
- Brent Rader – additional recording (4)
- Gena Johnson – additional recording (5)
- Jimmy Wallace – additional recording (5, 7)
- Spencer Cullum Jr. – additional recording (10, 12–14)
- Rachel Loy – additional recording (10, 12)
- Jaren Johnston – additional recording (11)
- Alena Moran – production coordination
- Julie Vastola – creative direction
- Annie Stoll – creative direction, design
- Emily Woodfield – creative direction
- Emily Simon – creative direction
- James Macari – photography

== Charts ==
Chart performance for Postcards from Texas
Chart (2024)	Peak position
Scottish Albums (Official Charts)	59
Swiss Albums (Schweizer Hitparade)	90
UK Album Downloads (Official Charts)	10
UK Country Albums (Official Charts)	4
US Billboard 200	21
US Top Country Albums (Billboard)	8

== Accolades ==
Year-end lists
Publication	Rank	List
Billboard	9	The 10 Best Country Albums of 2024
Rolling Stone	23	The 30 Best Country Albums of 2024
