= Willin' =

Willin' may refer to:

- Willin' (album), a 1999 album by Jon Randall
- "Willin'" (song), a song by Little Feat, written by lead singer Lowell George in 1970
