= Gotta Get Away (Sweethearts of the Rodeo song) =

Single by Sweethearts of the Rodeo

from the album Sweethearts of the Rodeo
- B-side: "Since I Found You"
- Released: September 12, 1987
- Genre: Country
- Length: 3:00
- Label: Columbia
- Songwriter(s): Janis Oliver
- Producer(s): Steve Buckingham

Sweethearts of the Rodeo singles chronology
"Chains of Gold" (1987)	"Gotta Get Away" (1987)	"Satisfy You" (1988)

"Gotta Get Away" is a song written by Janis Oliver, and recorded by American country music duo Sweethearts of the Rodeo. It was released in September 1987 as the fifth single from the album Sweethearts of the Rodeo. The song reached #10 on the Billboard Hot Country Singles & Tracks chart.

== Chart performance ==
Chart (1987)	Peak position
US Hot Country Songs (Billboard)	10
Canadian RPM Country Tracks	11
