= That's What Makes the Jukebox Play =

That's What Makes the Jukebox Play is a song title from these albums or singers and musicians:

- "That's What Makes the Jukebox Play" (1955) by musician and songwriter Jimmy Work
- "That's What Makes the Jukebox Play" (1955) by singer Anita Carter
- "That's What Makes the Jukebox Play" (1978) by singer Moe Bandy
- "That's What Makes the Jukebox Play" from the Palomino (Miranda Lambert album) (2022)
