= Satisfy You =

Satisfy You may refer to:

- Satisfy You, a song by Damion Hall ft Chante Moore
- "Satisfy You" (Puff Daddy song), 1999 song written by R. Kelly
- "Satisfy You" (Sweethearts of the Rodeo song), 1988 song composed by Don Schlitz and Janis Gill
- "Satisfy You", 1992 song by Cracker from Cracker
- "Satisfy You", 1698 song by The Seeds on Raw & Alive: The Seeds in Concert at Merlin's Music Box
