= What You Don't Know (Jon Randall album) =

Studio album by Jon Randall
- Released: June 27, 1995
- Recorded: 1994
- Studio: Sound Emporium (Nashville, Tennessee)
- Genre: Country
- Length: 37:41
- Label: RCA Nashville
- Producer: Garth Fundis, Sam Bush

Jon Randall chronology
What You Don't Know (1995)	Willin' (1999)

What You Don't Know is the debut studio album by country music artist Jon Randall and his first studio album released on the RCA Nashville label. Because of restructuring within the record company, this album received minimal promotion. His proposed next album, entitled Great Day to Be Alive, was shelved for the same reasons, although its title track was later a Top 5 hit for Travis Tritt in 2001.

"I Came Straight to You" was previously recorded by Kevin Welch in 1989 and released as a single from his self-titled debut album, and would later be covered by Patty Loveless. "This Heart" was previously a single for Sweethearts of the Rodeo in 1989. "Tennessee Blues" is a cover of a Bobby Charles song. The last track, "Just Like You", was written by Randall and is credited to his full name.

== Track listing ==
1. "This Heart" (Tony Haselden, Tim Mensy) - 2:59
2. "If Blue Tears Were Silver" (Verlon Thompson, Tommy Polk) - 3:47
3. "I Came Straight to You" (Kevin Welch, John Barlow Jarvis) - 3:23
4. "If I Hadn't Reached for the Stars" (Carl Jackson) - 3:20
5. "To Pieces" (Jackson) - 2:57
6. "Tennessee Blues" (Bobby Charles) - 4:16
7. "What You Don't Know" (Jim Lauderdale, John Leventhal) - 4:36
8. "Only Game in Town" (Russell Smith, Vince Melamed) - 4:07
9. "They're Gonna Miss Me When I'm Gone" (Jeff Black) - 4:03
10. "Just Like You" (Jon Randall Stewart) - 4:13

== Personnel ==
Adapted from liner notes.

Musicians

- Bobby All - acoustic guitar (2, 3, 5)
- Larry Atamanuik - drums (1, 6, 7, 10)
- Eddie Bayers - drums (2, 3, 5)
- Sam Bush - acoustic guitar (1, 2, 6), background vocals (1, 3, 9), fiddle (3, 5, 9), mandolin (7, 9)
- John Cowan - background vocals (3)
- Jerry Douglas - Dobro (9)
- Paul Franklin - pedal steel guitar (1, 4, 6, 8)
- Garth Fundis - background vocals (7)
- Vince Gill - background vocals (9)
- Emmylou Harris - background vocals (10)
- Roy Huskey Jr. - upright bass (7, 10)
- Carl Jackson - background vocals (5)
- Brent Mason - electric guitar (1, 2, 3, 5, 6)
- Steve Nathan - piano (1–6, 8, 9)
- Al Perkins - pedal steel guitar (2, 3, 5), lap steel guitar (7, 10), Dobro (7, 10)
- Dave Pomeroy - bass guitar (all tracks except 7 and 10)
- Jon Randall - lead vocals, acoustic guitar (1, 6, 7, 9, 10), background vocals (1, 2, 8)
- Steuart Smith - electric guitar (4, 8, 9)
- Steve Turner - drums (4, 8, 9)
- Billy Joe Walker Jr. - acoustic guitar (4, 8)
- Lari White - background vocals (2)
- Trisha Yearwood - background vocals (4, 7)
- Curtis "Mr. Harmony" Young - background vocals (5)
- Andrea Zonn - background vocals (6, 8)

Technical

- Sam Bush - producer
- Garth Fundis - producer, mixing
- Gary Laney - recording
- Denny Purcell - mastering
- Dave Sinko - recording, mixing
