= Buffalo Zone =

Studio album by Sweethearts of the Rodeo
- Released: January 16, 1990
- Recorded: 1989
- Genre: Country
- Length: 31:39
- Label: Columbia
- Producer: Steve Buckingham

Sweethearts of the Rodeo chronology
One Time, One Night (1988)	Buffalo Zone (1990)	Sisters (1992)

Buffalo Zone is the third studio album by American country music duo Sweethearts of the Rodeo, released in 1990 via Columbia Records. The album's cover was a homage to The Byrds' 1968 album Sweetheart of the Rodeo, from which the duo derived their name. The album was not as successful as their first two albums, Sweethearts of the Rodeo and One Time, One Night. Notable songs include "Uphill All the Way", "This Heart" (Billboard #25), "Hard Road to Go", and "Cómo Se Dice (I Love You)", although none charted very high.

== Critical reception ==
Professional ratings
Review scores
Source	Rating
Allmusic	3/5 stars

In his Allmusic review, critic Jason Ankeny called the album "more melancholy" than their previous work.

== Track listing ==
No.	Title	Writer(s)	Length
1.	"Uphill All the Way"	Janis Oliver, Don Schlitz	3:10
2.	"He Doesn't Tell Me Anything"	Tommy Rocco, Charlie Black, Austin Roberts	3:25
3.	"You Look at Love That Way"	Skip Ewing, Don Sampson	3:24
4.	"This Heart"	Tony Haselden, Tim Mensy	3:19
5.	"Hard Road to Go"	Oliver, Steve Buckingham, Schlitz	2:45
6.	"What It Does to Me"	Oliver	3:09
7.	"Blue Sky"	Oliver, Wendy Waldman	3:29
8.	"I Don't Want You to Know"	Oliver, Schlitz	3:16
9.	"Don't Wake Me Up"	Schlitz, Paul Overstreet	2:34
10.	"Cómo Se Dice (I Love You)?"	Oliver, Matraca Berg	3:16

=== Sweethearts of the Rodeo ===
- Kristine Arnold – vocals
- Janis Gill – vocals, acoustic guitar

=== Musicians ===
- Victor Battista – upright bass
- Eddie Bayers – drums
- Mark Casstevens – acoustic guitar
- Paul Franklin – dobro, pedal steel guitar
- Steve Gibson – electric guitar, mandolin
- Roy Huskey, Jr. – upright bass
- Albert Lee – electric guitar
- Tim Mensy – acoustic guitar
- Joey Miskulin – accordion
- Farrell Morris – vibraphone
- Phil Naish – keyboards
- Mark O'Connor – fiddle
- Tom Robb – bass guitar
- Ricky Skaggs – background vocals
- Harry Stinson – background vocals
- Pete Wasner – keyboards
- Curtis Young – background vocals

== Production ==
- Steve Buckingham – producer
- Janis Gill – associate producer
- Marshall Morgan – engineer
- Denny Purcell – mastering
- Gary Paczosa – assistant engineer
- Brad Jones – assistant engineer
- Jeanne Kinney – assistant engineer
- Bill Johnson – artwork, art direction
- Dennis Davis – artwork, design, illustrations
- Beth Mallen – production assistant

== Chart performance ==
Chart (1990)	Peak position
U.S. Billboard Top Country Albums	41
