= This Heart (Sweethearts of the Rodeo song) =

Single by Sweethearts of the Rodeo

from the album Buffalo Zone
- B-side: "So Sad (To Watch Good Love Go Bad)"
- Released: January 13, 1990
- Genre: Country
- Length: 3:19
- Label: Columbia
- Songwriter(s): Tim Mensy, Tony Haselden
- Producer(s): Steve Buckingham

Sweethearts of the Rodeo singles chronology
"If I Never See Midnight Again" (1989)	"This Heart" (1990)	"Cómo Se Dice (I Love You)" (1990)

"This Heart" is a song written by Tim Mensy and Tony Haselden and recorded by American country music duo Sweethearts of the Rodeo. It was released in January 1990 as the first single from the album Buffalo Zone. The song reached number 25 on the Billboard Hot Country Singles & Tracks chart. In 1994, a version by Jon Randall was released as the second single for his debut album What You Don't Know.

== Chart performance ==
=== Sweethearts of the Rodeo ===
Chart (1990)	Peak position
US Hot Country Songs (Billboard)	25
Canadian RPM Country Tracks	32

=== Jon Randall ===
Chart (1994)	Peak position
US Hot Country Songs (Billboard)	74
