= Chains of Gold (song) =

Single by Sweethearts of the Rodeo

from the album Sweethearts of the Rodeo
- B-side: "Gotta Get Away"
- Released: April 4, 1987
- Genre: Country
- Length: 2:53
- Label: Columbia
- Songwriter(s): Paul Kennerley
- Producer(s): Steve Buckingham

Sweethearts of the Rodeo singles chronology
| "Midnight Girl/Sunset Town" (1986) | "Chains of Gold" (1987) | "Gotta Get Away" (1987) |

"Chains of Gold" is a song written Paul Kennerley, and recorded by American country music duo Sweethearts of the Rodeo. It was released in April 1987 as the fourth single from the album Sweethearts of the Rodeo. The song reached #4 on the Billboard Hot Country Singles & Tracks chart.

== Chart performance ==
| Chart (1987) | Peak position |
|---|---|
| US Hot Country Songs (Billboard) | 4 |
| Canadian RPM Country Tracks | 7 |
