= Beautiful Lies (Sweethearts of the Rodeo album) =

Studio album by Sweethearts of the Rodeo
- Released: 1996
- Genre: Country
- Length: 38:56
- Label: Sugar Hill
- Producer: Janis Gill

Sweethearts of the Rodeo chronology
| Rodeo Waltz (1993) | Beautiful Lies (1996) |

Beautiful Lies is the sixth album from US country duo Sweethearts of the Rodeo. Included are covers of songs by Donovan ("Catch the Wind"), Bob Dylan ("One More Night"), and the Jimmie Rodgers/George Vaughn tune, "Mule Skinner Blues." Neither the album nor any singles appeared on the Billboard music charts.

== Reception ==
Professional ratings
Review scores
| Source | Rating |
|---|---|
| Allmusic | 2.5/5 stars |

In his Allmusic review, critic Kelly McCartney wrote of the album "... every now and then comes the rare traditionalist with a twang and a swagger and a bucket full of heartache to sing about. Enter Sweethearts of the Rodeo... Beautiful Lies is a decent little record. Nothing terribly earth-shattering, but that's just fine."

== Track listing ==
1. "When Love Comes Around the Bend" (Josh Leo, Pam Tillis, Mark Wright) – 2:42
2. "Beautiful Lies" (John Leventhal, Jim Lauderdale) – 3:48
3. "When the Morning Comes" (Janis Gill, Don Schlitz) – 3:41
4. "Catch the Wind" (Donovan) – 3:50
5. "I'll Pass Over Thee" (Ralph Burke) – 3:47
6. "I Won't Cry" (J. Gill, Paul Kennerley) – 3:26
7. "The Inn at Innisfree" (J. Gill, Harry P. Oliver) – 4:24
8. "I Know Who You Are" (J. Gill) – 4:44
9. "Pretty Words" (Vince Gill, Schlitz) – 2:54
10. "One More Night" (Bob Dylan) – 2:50
11. "Mule Skinner Blues" (Jimmie Rodgers, George Vaughn) – 2:44

== Personnel ==
=== Sweethearts of the Rodeo ===
- Kristine Arnold – vocals
- Janis Gill – vocals, acoustic guitar
