= Blue to the Bone =

Single by Sweethearts of the Rodeo

from the album One Time, One Night
- B-side: "You Never Talk Sweet"
- Released: August 6, 1988
- Genre: Country
- Length: 2:54
- Label: Columbia
- Songwriter(s): Michael Garvin, Bucky Jones
- Producer(s): Steve Buckingham

Sweethearts of the Rodeo singles chronology
"Satisfy You" (1988)	"Blue to the Bone" (1988)	"I Feel Fine" (1989)

"Blue to the Bone" is a song written by Michael Garvin and Bucky Jones, and recorded by American country music duo Sweethearts of the Rodeo. It was released in August 1988 as the second single from the album One Time, One Night. The song reached #5 on the Billboard Hot Country Singles & Tracks chart.

== Charts ==
=== Weekly charts ===
Chart (1988)	Peak position
US Hot Country Songs (Billboard)	5
Canadian RPM Country Tracks	8

=== Year-end charts ===
Chart (1988)	Position
US Hot Country Songs (Billboard)	52
