= Palomino (Miranda Lambert album) =

Studio album by Miranda Lambert
- Released: April 29, 2022
- Genre: Country
- Length: 50:27
- Labels: Vanner; RCA Nashville
- Producers: Miranda Lambert; Luke Dick; Jon Randall; Mikey Reaves

Miranda Lambert chronology
The Marfa Tapes (2021)	Palomino (2022)	Postcards from Texas (2024)

Singles from Palomino
- 1. "If I Was a Cowboy" Released: October 15, 2021; 2. "Strange" Released: July 18, 2022

Palomino is the eighth solo studio album by American country music singer Miranda Lambert, released through Vanner Records and RCA Records Nashville on April 29, 2022. It is her eighth solo studio album. Lambert produced the album alongside Luke Dick and Jon Randall and co-wrote 14 of the 15 tracks. It was preceded by the single "If I Was a Cowboy". This was her last album with Sony Music Nashville.

The album was nominated for the Country Music Association Award for Album of the Year.

== Background and writing ==
Lambert began writing the songs on her farm in Tennessee in 2020 with Luke Dick and Natalie Hemby. In 2021, Lambert collaborated with Jack Ingram and Jon Randall on the album The Marfa Tapes, on which "In His Arms", "Waxahachie", and "Geraldene" first appeared in a "stripped" acoustic form. The tracks were re-recorded for Palomino. Lambert collaborated with the B-52's for "Music City Queen" and covered Mick Jagger's 1993 song "Wandering Spirit" for the album.

== Promotion ==
"Strange" and "Actin' Up" were released ahead of the album as promotional singles. Lambert performed "Geraldine" at the 56th Annual Country Music Association Awards.

== Critical reception ==
Professional ratings
Aggregate scores
Source	Rating
Metacritic	83/100
Review scores
Source	Rating
AllMusic	4.5/5 stars
And It Don't Stop	A
Paste	8.1/10
Pitchfork	7.6/10
Rolling Stone	4/5 stars

Palomino was well-received by the music critics, On review aggregator Metacritic, Palomino received a score of 83 out of 100 based on seven reviews, indicating "universal acclaim". In an early review, Jon Freeman of Rolling Stone gave Palomino four out of five stars, calling the album a "welcome departure" for Lambert. Will Hermes of Pitchfork gave the album a 7.6/10, stating that "Lambert's breadth is on full display".

=== Year-end lists ===
Year-end rankings of Palomino
Publication	List	Rank	Ref.
Los Angeles Times	The 20 Best Albums of 2022	—N/a	
Rolling Stone	The 100 Best Albums of 2022	21	
Albumism	The 100 Best Albums of 2022	39	

== Commercial performance ==
Palomino debuted at number four on the US Billboard 200 with 36,000 album-equivalent units (including 24,000 album sales), making it the highest debut of 2022 for a country artist and the most units earned in the first week for a country album in 2022. It is Lambert's seventh top-10 album. As of December 2022, the album has over 300 million global streams and 130,000 global sales.

== Track listing ==
Palomino track listing
No.	Title	Writer(s)	Length
1.	"Actin' Up"	Miranda Lambert; Luke Dick; Jon Randall	3:25
2.	"Scenes"	Lambert; Dick; Natalie Hemby	2:54
3.	"In His Arms"	Lambert; Jack Ingram; Randall	2:39
4.	"Geraldene"	Lambert; Ingram; Randall	3:01
5.	"Tourist"	Lambert; Dick; Hemby	3:35
6.	"Music City Queen" (featuring The B-52's)	Lambert; Dick; Hemby	3:19
7.	"Strange"	Lambert; Dick; Hemby	3:31
8.	"Wandering Spirit"	Mick Jagger; James Rippetoe	3:36
9.	"I'll Be Lovin' You"	Lambert; Dick; Randall	3:09
10.	"That's What Makes the Jukebox Play"	Lambert; Dick; Hemby	4:09
11.	"Country Money"	Lambert; Aaron Raitiere; Mikey Reaves	3:19
12.	"If I Was a Cowboy"	Lambert; Jesse Frasure	3:14
13.	"Waxahachie"	Lambert; Ingram; Randall	3:29
14.	"Pursuit of Happiness"	Lambert; Dick; Hemby	2:48
15.	"Carousel"	Lambert; Dick; Hemby	4:19
Total length:			50:27

== Personnel ==
=== Musicians ===
- Cary Barlowe – electric guitar
- Sarah Buxton – background vocals
- Luke Dick – acoustic guitar, bass guitar, electric guitar, ganjo, harmonica, keyboards, percussion, programming, steel guitar, background vocals, handclaps
- Fred Eltringham – drums, percussion, handclaps
- Ian Fitchuk – B-3 organ, bass guitar, Fender Rhodes, keyboards, percussion, piano
- Kenny Greenberg – steel guitar
- Natalie Hemby – background vocals
- Miranda Lambert – lead vocals, background vocals
- Jason Lehning – bass guitar, keyboards
- Alfreda McCrary – background vocals
- Beverly McCrary – background vocals
- Regina McCrary – background vocals
- Rob McNelley – acoustic guitar, electric guitar, handclaps
- Al Perkins – pedal steel guitar
- Kate Pierson – background vocals on "Music City Queen"
- Jon Randall – acoustic guitar, mandolin, background vocals, handclaps
- Mikey Reaves – bass guitar, electric guitar, programming
- Fred Schneider – background vocals on "Music City Queen"
- Jimmy Wallace – keyboards
- Cindy Wilson – background vocals on "Music City Queen"
- Craig Young – bass guitar, handclaps

=== Technical ===
- Luke Dick – producer (all tracks)
- Miranda Lambert – producer (all tracks)
- Jon Randall – producer (all tracks)
- Mikey Reaves – producer (track 11)
- Jason Lehning – mixing engineer (all tracks)

=== Other ===
- Alena Moran – production coordinator (all tracks)

== Charts ==
=== Weekly charts ===
Weekly chart performance for Palomino
Chart (2022)	Peak position
Australian Albums (ARIA)	59
Australian Country Albums (ARIA)	5
Canadian Albums (Billboard)	31
Scottish Albums (Official Charts)	16
Swiss Albums (Schweizer Hitparade)	36
UK Albums (Official Charts)	90
UK Country Albums (Official Charts)	1
US Billboard 200	4
US Top Country Albums (Billboard)	2

=== Year-end charts ===
2022 year-end chart performance for Palomino
Chart (2022)	Position
US Top Country Albums (Billboard)	37
