= One Time, One Night =

Studio album by Sweethearts of the Rodeo
- Released: June 25, 1988
- Genre: Country
- Length: 33:29
- Label: Columbia
- Producer: Steve Buckingham

Sweethearts of the Rodeo chronology
Sweethearts of the Rodeo (1986)	One Time, One Night (1988)	Buffalo Zone (1990)

Singles from One Time, One Night
- 1. "Satisfy You" Released: April 2, 1988; 2. "Blue to the Bone" Released: August 6, 1988; 3. "I Feel Fine" Released: December 3, 1988; 4. "If I Never See Midnight Again" Released: April 15, 1989

Professional ratings
Review scores
Source	Rating
Allmusic	link

One Time, One Night is the second studio album by American country music duo Sweethearts of the Rodeo, released in 1988 via Columbia Records. The album includes "Satisfy You" and "Blue to the Bone," which both hit #5 on the Billboard Hot Country Singles chart. A cover of the Beatles's "I Feel Fine" rose to #9, while "If I Never See Midnight Again" could only manage a #39 ranking. Other notable tunes include "You Never Talk Sweet" and a cover of an Everly Brothers song, "So Sad (To Watch Good Love Go Bad)."

== Track listing ==
No.	Title	Writer(s)	Length
1.	"Satisfy You"	Janis Oliver, Don Schlitz	2:40
2.	"Blue to the Bone"	Michael Garvin, Bucky Jones	2:54
3.	"We Won't Let That River Come Between Us"	Wally Wilson, Kevin Welch	3:00
4.	"So Sad (To Watch Good Love Go Bad)"	Don Everly	3:08
5.	"Don't Look Down"	Wendy Waldman, Steve Buckingham	2:51
6.	"One Time, One Night"	David Hidalgo, Louie Pérez	3:18
7.	"You Never Talk Sweet"	Oliver, Schlitz	2:38
8.	"I Feel Fine"	John Lennon, Paul McCartney	2:36
9.	"If I Never See Midnight Again"	Schlitz, Craig Bickhardt	3:12
10.	"Gone Again"	Oliver, Gail Davies	3:31
11.	"Until I Stop Dancing"	Troy Seals, Buckingham, Howard Shore	3:18

== Personnel ==
=== Sweethearts of the Rodeo ===
- Kristine Arnold – vocals
- Janis Gill – vocals, acoustic guitar

=== Musicians ===
Instruments uncredited in liner notes

- Eddie Bayers – drums
- Barry Beckett – keyboards
- Richard Bennett – electric guitar
- Steve Buckingham – acoustic guitar
- Dennis Burnside – keyboards
- Larry Byrom – electric guitar
- Rodney Crowell – background vocals
- Paul Franklin – steel guitar
- Steve Gibson – acoustic guitar
- Vince Gill – background vocals
- David Hungate – bass guitar
- Roy Huskey, Jr. – upright bass
- Randy McCormick – keyboards
- Augie Meyers – keyboards
- Joey Miskulin – accordion
- Farrell Morris – Percussion
- Mark O'Connor – fiddle
- Tom Robb – bass guitar
- Ricky Skaggs – mandolin
- Harry Stinson – drums
- Billy Joe Walker, Jr. – electric guitar
- Pete Wasner – keyboards

== Charts ==
=== Weekly charts ===
Chart (1988)	Peak position
US Top Country Albums (Billboard)	11

=== Year-end charts ===
Chart (1989)	Position
US Top Country Albums (Billboard)	52
