= Snakeskin Boots =

Single by Miranda Lambert and Ella Langley

from the album Crisco
- Released: October 2, 2026
- Genre: Country
- Length: 4:09 (album version); 3:48 (radio edit)
- Label: MCA
- Songwriters: Miranda Lambert; Jesse Frasure; Natalie Hemby; Brendan McLoughlin; Kris Wilkinson
- Producers: Miranda Lambert; Jesse Frasure

Miranda Lambert singles chronology
"A Song to Sing" (2025)	"Snakeskin Boots" (2026)

Ella Langley singles chronology
"Jaded" (2026)	"Snakeskin Boots" (2026)	"Here Then We're Gone" (2026)

Lyric video
- "Snakeskin Boots" on YouTube

"Snakeskin Boots" is a song by American country music singers Miranda Lambert and Ella Langley. It was released on October 2, 2026, as the second single from Lambert's tenth studio album, Crisco. Lambert wrote the song with her husband Brendan McLoughlin, Jesse Frasure, Natalie Hemby and Kris Wilkinson, and produced it with Frasure.

== Background ==
Lambert stated she was thinking about Langley's style while writing the song. She had realized they both shared many retro influences while working on Langley's album Dandelion. Lambert compared the song's concept to the film Thelma & Louise, describing it as a story of "two badass women getting away with something".

== Composition ==
The song opens with a 30-second guitar or mandolin intro, after which the singers trade lines in the first verse before joining together in the chorus. The lyrics depict a mysterious and dangerous woman who leads a thrill-seeking lifestyle and always is ready to make her escape and stay one step ahead. They use her snakeskin boots as a symbol of independence.

== Critical reception ==
Billy Dukes of Taste of Country gave a positive review, stating "Great songwriting, new inspiration and sharp edges captivate a listener from the start". He also praised it for "smart rhymes and a selection of perfect metaphors" that "do the job knowing their soundscape will fill in the gaps". In a review of Crisco, Joseph Hudak of Rolling Stone described "Snakeskin Boots" as the "the only entry that sounds remotely out of place".

== Charts ==
Chart performance for "Snakeskin Boots"
Chart (2026)	Peak position
Canada Hot 100 (Billboard)	70
Canada Country (Billboard)	32
US Billboard Hot 100	42
US Country Airplay (Billboard)	31
US Hot Country Songs (Billboard)	12
