= The Marfa Tapes =

Studio album by Miranda Lambert, Jack Ingram and Jon Randall
- Released: May 7, 2021
- Recorded: 2020
- Studio: Marfa, Texas
- Genres: Country, Texas country
- Length: 47:52
- Label: RCA Nashville
- Producer: Brandon Bell

Miranda Lambert chronology
Wildcard (2019)	The Marfa Tapes (2021)	Palomino (2022)

Jack Ingram chronology
Ridin' High...Again (2019)	The Marfa Tapes (2021)

Jon Randall chronology
Walking Among the Living (2005)	The Marfa Tapes (2021)	Great Day to Be Alive (2023)

Singles from The Marfa Tapes
- 1. "In His Arms" Released: March 4, 2021; 2. "Tin Man" Released: March 12, 2021; 3. "Am I Right or Amarillo" Released: March 26, 2021; 4. "Geraldene" Released: April 28, 2021

The Marfa Tapes is a collaborative studio album by American country artists Miranda Lambert, Jack Ingram and Jon Randall. The album was released on May 7, 2021 through RCA Nashville. It is Randall's fourth, Lambert's eighth and Ingram's eleventh studio album.

Lambert hinted at an upcoming project with longtime friends and collaborators Randall and Ingram via her social media accounts on March 2, 2021, before announcing The Marfa Tapes in the following days. The tracklist was announced, with Lambert's previously recorded songs "Tin Man" and "Tequila Does" both featured on the album, and the first new song "In His Arms" was premiered with a video on March 5.

The album's style and recording process was a radical departure for Lambert in particular, whose voice on her own albums has been notably less raw. However, the change was praised by critics, who applauded her for both taking the musical risk, as well as all three artists for the album's content, which was noted for its high quality songwriting, substance, and lack of filler.

It was nominated for the Grammy Award for Best Country Album at the 64th Annual Grammy Awards.

== Background ==
The trio of songwriters first wrote together in July 2015, after Lambert's highly public divorce with fellow country singer Blake Shelton, and they claim the first song they wrote together was "The Wind's Just Gonna Blow", but according to Lambert in The Marfa Tapes film, they also wrote "Anchor", "Breaking a Heart" and Lambert's landmark acoustic track "Tin Man" (among others) on the same trip, and "Tin Man" was the only song written at this time which went on to be included on Lambert's critically acclaimed 2016 double album The Weight of These Wings. The song was released as the third single from the album, and went on to become one of Lambert's signature songs, going on to be named ACM Song of the Year in 2018.

Lambert later recorded another track written by the trio, this time for her 2019 album Wildcard, and while not released as a single, "Tequila Does" went on to become a fan favourite and was immensely popular at Lambert's live shows before the coronavirus pandemic halted her tour plans for 2020. She performed the song live on The Late Show with Stephen Colbert.

While she had previously commented on the special chemistry the trio had when writing together when receiving the award for 2018 Song of the Year for "Tin Man", it was not mentioned that they might ever record or release further music together. However, on March 2, 2021, Lambert hinted at an upcoming project with Randall and Ingram via her social media accounts, before announcing their upcoming collaborative acoustic record The Marfa Tapes in the following days. The tracklist was then announced, with Lambert's previously recorded songs "Tin Man" and "Tequila Does" both featured on the album, and the first new song "In His Arms" was premiered with a video on March 5.

The album was recorded in Marfa, Texas, near the end of 2020 with just two microphones and two acoustic guitars, and was said to have an unpolished feel, with one-take recordings retaining mistakes and snapshots of conversations between the three, and the sound of the campfire and the desert in the background.

== Promotion ==
"In His Arms" was performed live by Lambert, Randall and Ingram at the 2021 ACM Awards. The three announced that they would be performing songs from the album together to promote it on the fall Austin City Limits recordings, and their performance was taped April 29, 2021. Randall and Ingram stopped by to sing several songs with Lambert at her solo shows at Billy Bob's Texas, including "Tequila Does" and the newly released "Geraldene".

The new recording of "Tin Man", alongside previously unheard tracks "Am I Right or Amarillo" and "Geraldene" were also pre-released before the album's release on May 7, and the trio performed "Geraldene" live on The Ellen Degeneres Show later in the month.

At the CMT Music Awards in June 2021, the trio performed a selection of tracks off the album for the award show's 'Campfire Sessions' series, including In His Arms, Two-Step Down to Texas, and Amazing Grace (West Texas), alongside the previously released Tin Man and Tequila Does.

=== The Marfa Tapes film ===
The trio announced that alongside the record, they would be releasing The Marfa Tapes film directed by Spencer Peeples on Lambert's Facebook page to be available for 24 hours from May 8, which would feature acoustic performances from the record alongside interviews and behind-the-scenes footage from the recording process of the album.

The film premiered on Lambert's Facebook page on May 8, featuring original songs not previously seen and not included on The Marfa Tapes, the first of which was "Tornado"—co-written by Lambert, Randall and Ingram—and also a Lambert solo-written piece, "They've Closed Down the Honky-Tonks". It was removed—as planned—24 hours later, and was later released for purchase on iTunes.

== Critical reception ==
Professional ratings
Aggregate scores
Source	Rating
Metacritic	84/100
Review scores
Source	Rating
AllMusic	4/5 stars
And It Don't Stop	(2-star Honorable Mention)
Paste	7.6/10
Sputnikmusic	4.5/5
Tom Hull – on the Web	B+

The album was released to critical acclaim, with critics applauding Lambert's musical risk-taking and the simple but effective songwriting. As of May 2021, the album has a score of 84 on Metacritic, denoting "universal acclaim".

Pitchfork commented, "Somewhere between a demo collection, a live album with no audience, and a lo-fi left turn, this music is a joy to hear, like a vacation on record", and Variety questioned whether this might even be Lambert's best record so far, "And like her bigger, broader sounding albums, she gives as good as she gets, quietly, while sounding as grand as if she had a studio band's excess at work."

Sputnikmusic gave the album a score of 4.5/5, "When the three play together, the end product is as dynamic as it is breathtaking." AllMusic gave four out of five stars, commenting that "As a songbook, it's excellent, but it's equally effective as an album, as the trio harmonize and pick guitar with an emotional immediacy that gives The Marfa Tapes a warm, resonant immediacy." Paste gave 8.2/10, "The songwriting is first-rate, and the minimalist aesthetic suits these tunes in a way that more elaborate arrangements and polished production never would."

== Track listing ==
All tracks are written by Miranda Lambert, Jack Ingram and Jon Randall.

The Marfa Tapes track listing
No.	Title	Length
1.	"In His Arms"	2:30
2.	"I Don't Like It"	3:18
3.	"The Wind's Just Gonna Blow"	2:32
4.	"Am I Right or Amarillo"	3:31
5.	"Waxahachie"	3:17
6.	"Homegrown Tomatoes"	2:53
7.	"Breaking a Heart"	2:19
8.	"Ghost"	3:00
9.	"Geraldene"	3:08
10.	"We'll Always Have the Blues"	3:57
11.	"Tin Man"	4:25
12.	"Two-Step Down to Texas"	2:31
13.	"Anchor"	3:21
14.	"Tequila Does"	4:00
15.	"Amazing Grace (West Texas)"	3:10
Total length:		47:52

== Charts ==
Chart performance for The Marfa Tapes
Chart (2021)	Peak position
US Billboard 200	51
US Top Country Albums (Billboard)	7
US Americana/Folk Albums (Billboard)	1
