= If I Was a Cowboy =

2021 single by Miranda Lambert

Single by Miranda Lambert

from the album Palomino
- Released: October 15, 2021
- Genre: Country
- Length: 3:15
- Label: RCA Nashville
- Songwriters: Jesse Frasure; Miranda Lambert
- Producers: Miranda Lambert; Luke Dick; Jon Randall

Miranda Lambert singles chronology
"Drunk (And I Don't Wanna Go Home)" (2021)	"If I Was a Cowboy" (2021)	"Strange" (2022)

Music video
- "If I Was a Cowboy" on YouTube

"If I Was a Cowboy" is a song by American country music singer Miranda Lambert. It was released on October 15, 2021, as the lead single from her ninth solo studio album Palomino. The song was written by Lambert and Jesse Frasure, and produced by Lambert, Luke Dick and Jon Randall.

== Background ==
On October 8, 2021, Lambert posted a video on Instagram and teased her fans with a snippet of the song. She wrote the song with Frasure, and said in a press release, "We met doing the remix of 'Tequila Does' and he and I just got together one afternoon for a write and this is what came out of it. It's funny, he's a Detroit boy and I'm an East Texan, but somehow we wrote a song about the Wild West together."

== Content ==
Emily Lee of iHeart described "If I Was a Cowboy" as "a Wild West-inspired track". Angela Stefano of Taste of Country explained that the song is about "longing for life in the wild West".

== Critical reception ==
Casey Young of Whiskeyriff called the song "a country version of Beyoncé's hit "If I Were a Boy". Clayton Edwards of Outsider said that it "[is] steeped in classic Western sound with a modern flair", describing the lyrics as "Lambert daydreaming about being a cowboy".

== Music videos ==
Two music videos were made. The first was released on October 15, 2021. It showcases Lambert "riding a horse, driving a vintage pickup truck", and enjoying the leisurely western life. The official video, directed by Trey Fanjoy, was released on January 12, 2022. It was filmed in a small town in her home state of Texas.

== Charts ==
=== Weekly charts ===
Weekly chart performance for "If I Was a Cowboy"
Chart (2021–2022)	Peak position
Canada Hot 100 (Billboard)	53
Canada Country (Billboard)	3
US Billboard Hot 100	53
US Country Airplay (Billboard)	12
US Hot Country Songs (Billboard)	8

=== Year-end charts ===
2022 year-end chart performance for "If I Was a Cowboy"
Chart (2022)	Position
US Country Airplay (Billboard)	41
US Hot Country Songs (Billboard)	33

== Certifications ==
Certifications for "If I Was a Cowboy"
Region	Certification	Certified units/sales
Canada (Music Canada)	Platinum	80,000^{‡}
United States (RIAA)	Gold	500,000^{‡}
^{‡} Sales+streaming figures based on certification alone.

== Release history ==
Release history for "If I Was a Cowboy"
Region	Date	Format	Label	Ref.
Various	October 15, 2021	Digital download; streaming	RCA Records Nashville	
United States	October 18, 2021	Country radio	RCA Records Nashville	
