= Rodeo Waltz =

Studio album by Sweethearts of the Rodeo
- Released: 1993
- Genre: Country
- Length: 42:47
- Label: Sugar Hill
- Producer: Janis Gill

Sweethearts of the Rodeo chronology
| Sisters (1992) | Rodeo Waltz (1993) | Beautiful Lies (1996) |

Rodeo Waltz is a 1993 album by the American country duo Sweethearts of the Rodeo. The album was their first for Sugar Hill Records, and it did not include any singles.

== Reception ==
Professional ratings
Review scores
| Source | Rating |
|---|---|
| Allmusic | 3/5 stars |

In his Allmusic review, critic Kelly McCartney wrote of the album, "In an age when country and pop are almost indistinguishable, it's nice to have a few artists dusting off some good, old tunes and offering them up to a new generation of fans."

Mike Boehm of the Los Angeles Times wrote, "The material moves from old-line honky-tonk and country classics (a good, springy treatment of Johnny Cash's rockin' "Get Rhythm") to contributions from contemporary country songwriter Don Schlitz."

== Track listing ==
| No. | Title | Writer(s) | Length |
|---|---|---|---|
| 1. | "Get Rhythm" | Johnny Cash | 3:25 |
| 2. | "Long Time Gone" | Frank Harford; Tex Ritter | 2:57 |
| 3. | "Things Will Grow" | Don Schlitz | 3:29 |
| 4. | "Hoping That You're Hoping" | Betty Harrison | 2:27 |
| 5. | "Jenny Dreamed Of Trains" | Vince Gill; Guy Clark | 4:19 |
| 6. | "Brand New Tennessee Waltz" | Jesse Winchester | 4:26 |
| 7. | "Bluegrass Boy" | J. Gill; Schlitz | 2:57 |
| 8. | "Please Help Me I'm Falling" | Don Robertson; Hal Blair | 3:02 |
| 9. | "Deep River Blues" | Traditional; arr. J. Gill | 2:59 |
| 10. | "There One Morning" | J. Gill | 3:30 |
| 11. | "Steel Rail Blues" | Gordon Lightfoot | 3:24 |
| 12. | "Broken Arrow" | Robbie Robertson | 5:52 |
| Total length: | | | 42:47 |

== Personnel ==
=== Sweethearts of the Rodeo ===
- Kristine Arnold – vocals
- Janis Gill – vocals, acoustic guitar

=== Musicians ===
- Sam Bush – mandolin
- Bobby Clark – mandolin
- Stuart Duncan – fiddle
- Vince Gill – electric guitar
- Roy Huskey Jr. – bass guitar, upright bass
- Kenny Malone – drums, percussion
- Terry McMillan – harmonica
- Joey Miskulin – accordion
- Pete Wasner – keyboards

Track information and credits verified from Discogs, AllMusic, and the album's liner notes.
