= Watching Airplanes =

Single by Gary Allan

from the album Living Hard
- Released: July 23, 2007
- Recorded: 2007
- Genre: Country
- Length: 4:03
- Label: MCA Nashville
- Songwriters: Jim Beavers, Jonathan Singleton
- Producers: Mark Wright, Gary Allan

Gary Allan singles chronology
"A Feelin' Like That" (2006)	"Watching Airplanes" (2007)	"Learning How to Bend" (2008)

"Watching Airplanes" is a song written by Jim Beavers and Jonathan Singleton, and recorded by American country music singer Gary Allan. It was released in July 2007 as the first single from Allan's 2007 album Living Hard and as the twelfth of his career. The song became Allan's tenth Top 10 on the US Billboard country charts after reaching number 2 in early 2008. "Watching Airplanes" was nominated for the 'Single Record of the Year' at the 43rd Annual Academy of Country Music Awards on May 18, 2008. This song was written for and in remembrance of Allan's wife, who committed suicide and was a former flight attendant.

== Music video ==
The music video for this song was shot during live concerts at Red Rocks Amphitheatre in Morrison, Colorado, the Red Dirt Roundup '07 in Fort Worth, Texas, the Nutty Brown Cafe in Austin, Texas, and in Saint George, Utah.

== Chart performance ==
"Watching Airplanes" debuted at number 53 on the US Billboard Hot Country Songs chart for the week of August 4, 2007. After spending 31 weeks on the chart, it peaked at number 2 for the chart week of March 1, 2008.

Chart (2007–2008)	Peak position
Canada Country (Billboard)	11
US Hot Country Songs (Billboard)	2
US Billboard Hot 100	43
US Billboard Pop 100	80
Canada Hot 100 (Billboard)	72

=== Year-end charts ===
Chart (2008)	Position
US Country Songs (Billboard)	26

== Certifications ==
Region	Certification	Certified units/sales
United States (RIAA)	Platinum	1,000,000^{‡}
^{‡} Sales+streaming figures based on certification alone.
