= Sisters (Sweethearts of the Rodeo album) =

Studio album by Sweethearts of the Rodeo
- Released: July 14, 1992
- Recorded: 1991
- Genre: Country
- Length: 34:22
- Label: Columbia
- Producer: Steve Buckingham, Wendy Waldman

Sweethearts of the Rodeo chronology
Buffalo Zone (1990)	Sisters (1992)	Rodeo Waltz (1993)

Sisters is a 1992 album from US country duo Sweethearts of the Rodeo. The only Billboard charting hits on Sisters were minor, with "Hard-Headed Man" at #63 and "Devil and Your Deep Blue Eyes" at #74.

== Reception ==
Professional ratings
Review scores
Source	Rating
Allmusic	2/5 stars

In his Allmusic review, critic Thom Owen called the album "a subtle, sweet album of introspective folk-laced country, highlighted by the lovely harmonies."

== Track listing ==
1. "Why Should I Stay Blue" (Mike Reid, Rory Michael Bourke) – 2:35
2. "Hard-Headed Man" (Andy Landis, Don Schlitz) – 3:18
3. "I Don't Stay Down for Long" (Janis Oliver Gill, Wendy Waldman) – 3:06
4. "Man of My Dreams" (Janis Oliver Gill) – 3:18
5. "A Woman Can Tell" (Every Time)" (Janis Oliver Gill, Andy Landis) – 2:53
6. "Have I Done Enough" (Janis Oliver Gill, Waldman, Rick Vincent) – 3:12
7. "Devil and Your Deep Blue Eyes" (Russell Smith, Lee Roy Parnell) – 2:51
8. "(Our Love Is Like) Silver and Gold" (Janis Oliver Gill, Wendy Waldman) – 3:44
9. "Be Good to Me" (Janis Oliver Gill, Wendy Waldman, Rick Vincent) – 3:00
10. "Watch Me Run" (Janis Oliver Gill, Andy Landis) – 2:56
11. "Sisters (Best of Friends)" (Janis Oliver Gill, Wendy Waldman, Kristine Arnold) – 3:29

=== Sweethearts of the Rodeo ===
- Kristine Arnold – vocals
- Janis Gill – vocals, acoustic guitar

=== Musicians ===
- Sam Bush – mandolin
- Bobby Clark – mandolin
- Stuart Duncan – fiddle
- Vince Gill – electric guitar
- Roy Huskey Jr. – upright bass
- Terry McMillan – harmonica
- Kenny Malone – drums, percussion
- Joey Miskulin – accordion
- Pete Wasner – keyboards
