= She's So California =

Single by Gary Allan

from the album Living Hard
- Released: October 6, 2008
- Recorded: 2007
- Genre: Country
- Length: 3:21
- Label: MCA Nashville
- Songwriters: Gary Allan, Jaime Hanna, Jon Randall
- Producers: Mark Wright, Gary Allan

Gary Allan singles chronology
"Learning How to Bend" (2008)	"She's So California" (2008)	"Today" (2009)

"She's So California" is a song co-written and recorded by American country music artist Gary Allan. It was released in October 2008 as the third and final single from his 2007 album Living Hard. The song reached number 24 on the U.S. Billboard Hot Country Songs chart. The song was written by Allan, Jaime Hanna and Jon Randall.

== Critical reception ==
Blake Boldt of Country Universe gave it a B-rating saying it was "little more than album filler", calling the production both "modest and "a bit sterile", but saying that Allan's "gravelly" vocal was of note. Allen Jacobs of Roughstock gave the song a favorable review, writing that "the big chorus with fiddle-play is the best part of the song" and "the storyline is as vast and dynamic as the state that inspired it."

== Chart performance ==
Chart (2008–2009)	Peak position
US Hot Country Songs (Billboard)	24
