= Walking Among the Living =

Studio album by Jon Randall
- Released: September 20, 2005
- Recorded: September 2003 – January 2005
- Genre: Country
- Label: Epic
- Producer: George Massenburg, Jon Randall

Jon Randall chronology
Willin' (1999)	Walking Among the Living (2005)	The Marfa Tapes (2021)

Professional ratings
Review scores
Source	Rating
Allmusic	link

Walking Among the Living is the third studio album released by American country music singer Jon Randall. It is his third major-label album, and his first album since Willin' in 1999. This album includes the song "Whiskey Lullaby", which was also recorded by Brad Paisley as a duet with Alison Krauss on Paisley's 2003 album Mud on the Tires. Paisley's version was a Top 5 country hit in mid-2004. Singles released from Walking Among the Living include "Baby Won't You Come Home" and "I Shouldn't Do This", neither of which charted.

== Track listing ==
1. "Baby Won't You Come Home" (Jon Randall) – 3:32
2. "In the Country" (Randall, Gary Scruggs) – 4:05
3. "North Carolina Moon" (Randall, Ronnie Stewart) – 5:02
4. "Somebody Else" (Randall) – 3:33
5. "Long Way Down" (Randall) – 4:11
6. "Whiskey Lullaby" (Randall, Bill Anderson) – 4:54
7. "Austin" (Randall) – 3:56
8. "I Shouldn't Do This" (Randall) – 3:48
9. "Reprise for Somebody Else" (Randall) – 0:55
10. "Coming Back for More" (Randall, Gary Nicholson) – 3:32
11. "Lonely for Awhile" (Randall, Nicholson) – 4:46
12. "Walking Among the Living" (Randall, Jessi Alexander) – 3:30
13. "No Southern Comfort" (Randall, John Scott Sherrill) – 3:53
14. "My Life" (Robert Lee Castleman) – 4:28

== Personnel ==
- Jessi Alexander – background vocals
- Karen Elaine Bakunin – viola
- Pat Bergeson – acoustic guitar, electric guitar, National guitar, gut string guitar, harmonica
- Chris Brown – drums, percussion
- Denyse Buffum – viola
- Sam Bush – fiddle, mandolin, slide mandolin, background vocals
- Steve Conn – piano, Hammond B-3 organ, accordion, Wurlitzer electric piano
- Larry Corbett – cello
- John Cowan – background vocals
- Greg Davis – banjo
- Dan Dugmore – pedal steel guitar
- Glen Duncan – banjo, electric guitar
- Stuart Duncan – fiddle, mandolin, octave violin
- Béla Fleck – banjo
- Vince Gill – background vocals
- Kenny Greenberg – electric guitar
- Trey Henry – double bass
- Byron House – bass guitar, double bass
- Rob Ickes – Dobro, lap steel guitar
- Sonya Isaacs – background vocals
- Carl Jackson – background vocals
- Alison Krauss – background vocals
- Andy Leftwich – fiddle, mandolin
- Patty Loveless – background vocals
- Carole Mukogawa – viola
- Gary Nicholson – National guitar
- Dave Pomeroy – bass guitar, double bass
- Jon Randall – acoustic guitar, electric guitar, gut string guitar, vocals
- Darrell Scott – background vocals
- Rudy Stein – cello
- Pete Wasner – piano, accordion, Hammond B-3 organ, Wurlitzer electric piano
- Evan Wilson – viola
