= Living Hard =

Studio album by Gary Allan
- Released: October 23, 2007
- Recorded: 2007
- Studio: Sound Kitchen and House of Gain (Franklin, Tennessee); Starstruck Studios and Little Big Sound Studio (Nashville, Tennessee)
- Genre: Country
- Length: 41:01
- Label: MCA Nashville
- Producer: Mark Wright Gary Allan

Gary Allan chronology
Greatest Hits (2007)	Living Hard (2007)	Get Off on the Pain (2010)

Singles from Living Hard
- 1. "Watching Airplanes" Released: July 23, 2007; 2. "Learning How to Bend" Released: March 17, 2008; 3. "She's So California" Released: October 6, 2008

Professional ratings
Review scores
Source	Rating
Allmusic	4/5 stars
Slant Magazine	3.5/5 stars

Living Hard is the seventh studio album by American country music singer Gary Allan. It was released on October 23, 2007 via MCA Nashville.

The album debuted at number three on the U.S. Billboard 200 chart, selling approximately 69,000 copies during its first week. Its lead-off single, "Watching Airplanes", reached number 2 on the country charts, its second single "Learning How to Bend" peaked at number 13, and the third single "She's So California" went to number 24. "Like It's a Bad Thing" was later recorded by Danny Gokey on his 2010 debut album My Best Days. "Half of My Mistakes" was written by Bobby Houck and Radney Foster and originally recorded by Houck's band, the Blue Dogs, on their 2004 album, Halos and Good Buys, then by Foster on his 2004 album And Then There's Me (The Back Porch Sessions), and finally by Jace Everett on his 2005 self-titled debut album.

== Track listing ==
No.	Title	Writer(s)	Length
1.	"Watching Airplanes"	Jim Beavers, Jonathan Singleton	4:03
2.	"We Touched the Sun"	Gary Allan, Odie Blackmon, Jim Lauderdale	3:42
3.	"She's So California"	Allan, Jaime Hanna, Jon Randall	3:21
4.	"Like It's a Bad Thing"	Wendell Mobley, Tony Martin, Neil Thrasher	3:23
5.	"Learning How to Bend"	Allan, James LeBlanc, Matt Warren	3:27
6.	"As Long as You're Looking Back"	Aaron Barker, Dean Dillon, Scotty Emerick	3:29
7.	"Wrecking Ball"	Audley Freed, Keith Gattis	3:49
8.	"Yesterday's Rain"	Allan, LeBlanc, Warren	3:55
9.	"Trying to Matter"	Allan, Casey Beathard, Blackmon	3:27
10.	"Half of My Mistakes"	Radney Foster, Bobby Houck	4:31
11.	"Living Hard"	Allan, Blackmon, Bob DiPiero	3:54
Total length:			41:01

iTunes bonus track
No.	Title	Length
12.	"Memory on the Run"	2:59

== Personnel ==
From Living Hard liner notes.

Musicians and vocalists

- Gary Allan – vocals
- Steve Nathan – acoustic piano, Wurlitzer electric piano, Hammond B3 organ
- Kenny Greenberg – electric guitars
- Russ Pahl – acoustic guitars, steel guitar
- Brent Rowan – electric guitars
- John Willis – acoustic guitars, mandolin
- Jaime Hanna – electric guitar (3), backing vocals (3)
- Robby Turner – steel guitar
- Dan Dugmore – steel guitar (3)
- Michael Rhodes – bass
- Glenn Worf – bass
- Chad Cromwell – drums
- Eric Darken – percussion
- Hank Singer – fiddle
- The Love Sponge Strings – strings (1, 5)
- Kristin Wilkinson – string arrangements (1, 5)
- Stephen Lamb – copyist (1, 5)
- Perry Coleman – backing vocals (1)
- Wes Hightower – backing vocals
- Russell Terrell – backing vocals
- Jon Randall – backing vocals (3)
- Jerry Flowers – backing vocals (7)

Production

- Gary Allan – producer
- Mark Wright – producer
- Greg Droman – recording, mixing
- Steve Beers – recording assistant
- Leslie Richter – recording assistant
- Ben Terry – recording assistant
- Daewoo Kim – additional recording assistant
- Bobby Shin – additional recording assistant
- Hank Williams – mastering at MasterMix (Nashville, Tennessee)
- Carie Higdon – project coordinator
- Craig Allen – art direction, design
- Tony Baker – photography
- Renee Layher – wardrobe stylist
- Katinka Selesnick – hair, make-up
- John Lytle – management

== Charts ==
=== Weekly charts ===
Chart (2007)	Peak position
US Billboard 200	3
US Top Country Albums (Billboard)	3

=== Year-end charts ===
Chart (2007)	Position
US Top Country Albums (Billboard)	74
Chart (2008)	Position
US Billboard 200	143
US Top Country Albums (Billboard)	24

== Certifications ==
Region	Certification
United States (RIAA)	Gold
