= A Song to Sing =

2025 single by Miranda Lambert and Chris Stapleton

Single by Miranda Lambert and Chris Stapleton

from the album Crisco
- Released: July 14, 2025
- Genre: Country; disco
- Length: 2:59
- Label: Republic; Big Loud
- Songwriters: Miranda Lambert; Chris Stapleton; Jenee Fleenor; Jesse Frasure
- Producer: Dave Cobb

Miranda Lambert singles chronology
"Run" (2025)	"A Song to Sing" (2025)	"Snakeskin Boots" (2026)

Chris Stapleton singles chronology
"Think I'm in Love with You" (2024)	"A Song to Sing" (2025)

Music video
- "A Song to Sing" on YouTube

"A Song to Sing" is a song by American country music singers Miranda Lambert and Chris Stapleton. It was released to country radio on July 14, 2025 as the lead single from Lambert's tenth studio album, Crisco.

It was nominated for the Best Country Duo/Group Performance and Best Country Song at the 68th Annual Grammy Awards.

== Background ==
Lambert and Stapleton co-wrote "A Song to Sing" with Jenee Fleenor and Jesse Frasure, and it was produced by Dave Cobb. The bones of the track were first begun in 2023, when Frasure and Fleenor created musical beds for a 1970s disco-inspired track, and it developed into a full-fledged song when Frasure played the groove for Lambert and Stapleton when they met with him at his studio to write. They sat on the song for several years after writing it, before finally cutting it in 2024 with Cobb in Savannah, Georgia at the Georgia Mae Studio, and it was finally finished when engineer Tom Elmhirst, affiliated with New York's Electric Lady Studios, mixed it in 2025. Though Lambert and Stapleton have written and performed songs together before, this song marks their first recorded duet together. The song draws inspiration from classic country duets, namely "Islands in the Stream" by Dolly Parton and Kenny Rogers.

== Music video ==
The music video for "A Song to Sing" premiered on August 22, 2025. It was directed by Running Bear and filmed at a roller rink (Brentwood Skate Center) just outside Nashville. The video channels a vintage 1970s era vibe, specifically drawing inspiration from Dolly Parton and Kenny Rogers, with Lambert and Stapleton wearing jewelry borrowed from their estates.

== Live performances ==
Lambert and Stapleton performed the song live on the 59th Annual Country Music Association Awards on November 19, 2025.

== Chart performance ==
"A Song to Sing" was the most-added song at country radio upon release with 111 total stations, and debuted at number 20 on the Billboard Country Airplay chart dated July 26, 2025.

== Charts ==
Chart performance for "A Song to Sing"
Chart (2025–2026)	Peak position
Canada Country (Billboard)	38
US Bubbling Under Hot 100 (Billboard)	8
US Country Airplay (Billboard)	17
US Hot Country Songs (Billboard)	30
