= Learning How to Bend =

Single by Gary Allan

from the album Living Hard
- Released: March 17, 2008
- Recorded: 2007
- Genre: Country
- Length: 3:27
- Label: MCA Nashville
- Songwriters: Gary Allan, James LeBlanc, Matt Warren
- Producers: Mark Wright, Gary Allan

Gary Allan singles chronology
"Watching Airplanes" (2007)	"Learning How to Bend" (2008)	"She's So California" (2008)

"Learning How to Bend" is a song co-written and recorded by American country music singer Gary Allan. It was released in March 2008 as the second single from his 2007 album Living Hard. The song peaked at number 13 on the U.S. Billboard Hot Country Songs chart. Allan wrote the song with James LeBlanc and Matt Warren.

== Critical reception ==
Thom Jurek of Allmusic thought that the song had better production than the others on the album, saying, "With the echo effects on the vocal and the big strings at the same volume as those ringing, jangling guitars, [the musicians] can't miss."

Jonathan Keefe of Slant Magazine also made note of Allan's "effective falsetto."

Leeann Ward of CountryUniverse.net gave it an A rating, citing Allan's "raw and powerful delivery" and his use of falsetto in the chorus, as well as the "interesting production."

== Music video ==
The music video was shot in Atlantic City, New Jersey, and at live performances, and was directed by Stephen Shephard, who also directed his previous music video "Watching Airplanes" in 2007.

== Chart performance ==
"Learning How to Bend" debuted at number 51 on the U.S. Billboard Hot Country Songs chart dated April 5, 2008.

Chart (2008)	Peak position
Canada Country (Billboard)	23
US Hot Country Songs (Billboard)	13
US Billboard Hot 100	96
