= Crisco (album) =

Studio album by Miranda Lambert
- Released: October 2, 2026
- Genre: Country pop
- Length: 38:28
- Label: MCA
- Producers: Miranda Lambert; Jesse Frasure

Miranda Lambert chronology
Postcards from Texas (2024)	Crisco (2026)

Singles from Crisco
- 1. "A Song to Sing" Released: July 11, 2025; 2. "Snakeskin Boots" Released: October 2, 2026

Crisco is the tenth solo studio album by American country music singer–songwriter Miranda Lambert. The album was released on October 2, 2026, via Music Corporation of America. Produced by Lambert and Jesse Frasure, the album is a sonic expansion for Lambert which incorporates 1970s and 80s disco and yacht rock influences into her usual country style. The album contains 11 original tracks, all of which were co-written by Lambert, plus a cover of Jim Croce's "I'll Have to Say I Love You in a Song". The album also includes collaborations with Chris Stapleton ("A Song to Sing") and Ella Langley ("Snakeskin Boots"), which were both released as singles.

== Background ==
Lambert expressed that she hadn't initially intended to create a "country disco record" when she began work on her follow-up to 2024's Postcards from Texas, which was primarily a neotraditional country project, and that she has always been committed to sticking to her country roots and was not interested in crossing over to the pop world. She noted that she had originally begun to admire and understand the influence and reach of some of her musical predecessors while celebrating WorldPride with her brother and his husband at a drag bar in New York City in 2019. Of the experience, she stated, "all they were playing was, like, Reba and Dolly and Loretta and all these remixes on the video screens, and everyone was dancing their ass off. I always say I want to be [like] them, but I haven't done that", and noted that this eventually lead her to recruiting Frasure to remix her 2019 single "Tequila Does" into a tropical house track in 2021. Following this, the two began working together more often, which resulted in them writing "A Song to Sing", which set the tone for what would ultimately become Crisco. Lambert noted her initial surprise that the song felt so authentic to her despite being a deviation from her usual musical style. Of the album's sonic direction, Frasure explained, "I really loved when country music was playing around with pop sounds and arrangements in the '60s and '70s, even early '80s. So you had a lot of Glen Campbell. You had even Marty Robbins, his later stuff playing with string arrangements, or Lee Hazlewood or Nancy Sinatra playing with kind of pseudo western disco moments".

The album was heavily inspired by the music of the 1970s and 80s, with Lambert stating, "I've never explored that part of country, even though I love it". Initially intending to only create an extended play with Frasure, the project later developed into a full-length album as they continued creating together and cultivating the project's sound. Frasure created a playlist titled "Miranda-politan", which included songs like Campbell's "Southern Nights", Ronnie Milsap's "Smoky Mountain Rain", "Too Much Heaven" by the Bee Gees, and tracks by Dolly Parton, Kenny Rogers, Patsy Cline, Elvis Presley, and Louise Mandrell, which helped to influence the countrypolitan landscape of the album and ensure that the project remained cohesive. Lambert cited Parton as the album's primary influence, explaining, "Dolly's all over this, energy-wise. I feel like Dolly's one of those people who will be here forever, even if it's not on this Earth, but she's always been an angel, anyway. I feel like she's going to show up even more in our music and just keep influencing and blazing the trail even from up there". Lambert said that Crisco is "one of those records where you could put it on doing just about anything. My only goal is for people to feel like they want to do something fun — whether that's roller skating or taking a Sunday drive".

=== Singles ===
"A Song to Sing" featuring Chris Stapleton was released as the album's lead single on July 11, 2025. It marks the first official collaboration between Lambert and Stapleton, though Stapleton did provide backing vocals on "Hard Staying Sober", a song from Lambert's 2014 album Platinum.

Prior to the release of the album, Lambert released four promotional singles: "Crisco" on May 15, 2026, "Till the Going's Gone" on June 26, "Sunset Marquis" on August 7, and "Two Things Can Be True" on September 18.

The album's second single, "Snakeskin Boots", a duet with Ella Langley, was released as a single alongside the album's release on October 2, 2026. It is the pair's second collaboration following "Butterfly Season", which appeared on Langley's album, Dandelion, which Lambert co-produced.

== Promotion ==
Lambert celebrated the release of the album with two live performances. The first took place on October 1, 2026 at The Truth, a new venue in Nashville accompanied by a 12-piece string section, and was livestreamed on Amazon Music, Prime Video, and Twitch. The second took place on October 6 at Billy Bob's Texas.

== Reception ==
Professional ratings
Review scores
Source	Rating
Pitchfork	6.8/10
Rolling Stone	4/5 stars

Crisco received a four-star review from Joseph Hudak of Rolling Stone, who described "Snakeskin Boots" as the "the only entry that sounds remotely out of place". Hudak also compared the album to Heartbreaker by Dolly Parton, noting it as "not a stunt project". Pitchfork rated the album 6.8 out of 10 and stated, "the album sounds luscious—give Lambert and Frasure full credit. But the unity of mood and tempo results in a swirly-gooey sameness".

In a review for Riff Magazine, Piper Westrom remarked, "Across 12 tracks, Lambert puts her songwriting at the center while playing with disco influences, lush strings and brighter arrangements. A pair of well-chosen collaborations adds another dimension without pulling attention away from her".

== Track listing ==
Crisco track listing
No.	Title	Writer(s)	Length
1.	"Snakeskin Boots" (with Ella Langley)	Miranda Lambert; Jesse Frasure; Natalie Hemby; Brendan McLoughlin	4:09
2.	"Crisco"	Lambert; Chill Fellacheck; Frasure; Aaron Ratiere	2:56
3.	"Cowgirl Curtsy"	Lambert; Frasure; Hemby; McLoughlin	3:06
4.	"Two Things Can Be True"	Lambert; Frasure; Hemby; McLoughlin; Ilya Toshinskiy	3:18
5.	"Cuttin' Onions"	Lambert; Frasure; Cole Taylor; Josh Thompson	3:00
6.	"Till the Going's Gone"	Lambert; Frasure; Hemby; McLoughlin; Josh Osborne	3:00
7.	"To Everything"	Lambert; Ashley Monroe; Waylon Payne	3:24
8.	"Whiskey Business"	Lambert; Frasure; David Garcia; Ratiere	2:30
9.	"Right Where We Left It"	Lambert; Frasure; Hemby; McLoughlin	4:03
10.	"A Song to Sing" (with Chris Stapleton)	Lambert; Jenee Fleenor; Frasure; Chris Stapleton	2:57
11.	"I'll Have to Say I Love You in a Song"	Jim Croce	2:36
12.	"Sunset Marquis"	Lambert; Frasure; Garcia; Monroe; Payne	3:29
Total length:			38:28

Digital bonus track
No.	Title	Writer(s)	Length
13.	"Seven Year Ache" (with Parker McCollum)	Rosanne Cash	3:42
Total length:			42:10

== Personnel ==
Credits are adapted from Tidal.

=== Musicians ===
- Miranda Lambert – vocals (all tracks), background vocals (tracks 2–9, 11, 12)
- Jesse Frasure – programming (1–9, 11, 12); acoustic guitar, bass, drums, electric guitar, keyboards, pedal steel guitar (1)
- Kris Wilkinson – conducting, string arrangement (1–9, 11, 12); viola (2–4, 6, 7, 9, 12)
- Natalie Hemby – background vocals (1, 3, 4, 6, 9)
- Aaron Sterling – drums (2–9, 11, 12), percussion (4–9, 12)
- Charlie Judge – keyboards (2–9, 11, 12), synthesizer (11)
- Ethan Ballinger – acoustic guitar (2–9, 11, 12)
- Jimmie Lee Sloas – bass (2–9, 11, 12)
- Dann Huff – electric guitar (2–9, 11, 12)
- Paul Franklin – pedal steel guitar (2–9, 12)
- David Huff – programming (2–9, 11, 12)
- Kevin Bate – cello (2–4, 6, 7, 9, 12)
- Sari Reist – cello (2–4, 6, 7, 9, 12)
- Chris Farrell – viola (2–4, 6, 7, 9, 12)
- Alicia Enstrom – violin (2–4, 6, 7, 9, 12)
- Annaliese Kowert – violin (2–4, 6, 7, 9, 12)
- David Angell – violin (2–4, 6, 7, 9, 12)
- David Davidson – violin (2–4, 6, 7, 9, 12)
- Vanna Moua – background vocals (2, 5, 7, 8)
- Monisa Angell – violin (2), viola (7)
- Stevie Frasure – background vocals (3–6, 9–12)
- Jung-Min Shin – violin (3, 4, 6, 7, 9, 12)
- Daniel Reinker – viola (3, 4, 6, 9, 12)
- Anna Weisband – background vocals (5)
- Ashley Monroe – background vocals (7, 12)
- Waylon Payne – background vocals (7, 12)
- Chris Stapleton – vocals, electric guitar (10)
- Derek Mixon – drums, percussion (10)
- JT Cure – bass (10)
- Dave Cobb – electric guitar (10)
- Jenee Fleenor – fiddle (10)

=== Technical ===
- Jesse Frasure – production, additional engineering (1–9, 11, 12); additional production (10)
- Miranda Lambert – production (1–9, 11, 12)
- Dave Cobb – production (10)
- Sean Moffitt – engineering, mixing (1–9, 11, 12)
- Jase Keithley – engineering, mixing assistance (1–9, 11, 12)
- Brandon Bell – engineering (10)
- Darrell Thorp – additional engineering (10)
- Ethan Barrette – additional engineering (10)
- Austin Brown – engineering assistance (1–9, 11, 12)
- Tom Elmhirst – mixing (10)
- Joel McKinney – mixing assistance (1–9, 11, 12)
- David Huff – digital editing (1–9, 11, 12)
- Dale Becker – mastering (1–9, 11, 12)
- Pete Lyman – mastering (10)
- Daniel Bacigalupi – mastering (10)
- Adam Burt – mastering assistance (1–9, 11, 12)
- Katie Harvey – mastering assistance (1–9, 11, 12)
- Kegn Venegas – mastering assistance (1–9, 11, 12)
- Rose Hutcheson – production coordination (1–9, 11, 12)
- Scott Johnson – production coordination (1–9, 11, 12)
- Andrew Brightman – production coordination (10)

== Charts ==
Chart performance for Crisco
Chart (2026)	Peak position
Scottish Albums (Official Charts)	27
UK Albums Sales (Official Charts)	23
UK Americana Albums (Official Charts)	6
UK Country Albums (Official Charts)	1
US Billboard 200	19
US Top Country Albums (Billboard)	4
