= Midnight Girl/Sunset Town =

Single by Sweethearts of the Rodeo

from the album Sweethearts of the Rodeo
- B-side: "I Can't Resist"
- Released: November 29, 1986
- Genre: Country
- Length: 3:07
- Label: Columbia
- Songwriter(s): Don Schlitz
- Producer(s): Steve Buckingham

Sweethearts of the Rodeo singles chronology
"Since I Found You" (1986)	"Midnight Girl/Sunset Town" (1986)	"Chains of Gold" (1987)

"Midnight Girl/Sunset Town" is a song written by Don Schlitz, and recorded by American country music duo Sweethearts of the Rodeo. It was released in November 1986 as the third single from the album Sweethearts of the Rodeo. The song reached #4 on the Billboard Hot Country Singles & Tracks chart.

== Content ==
The song is about a young woman who is a native of an unnamed rural town with conservative values. Having taken a liking to the nightlife, the woman has grown restless and weary of her own rural upbringing and desires to abandon it altogether in favor of a relocation to a larger city. During the song, she—as part of the "Now I Lay Me Down To Sleep" prayer—prays that she will eventually be able to fulfill those exact wishes.

== Chart performance ==
Chart (1986–1987)	Peak position
US Hot Country Songs (Billboard)	4
Canadian RPM Country Tracks	6
