= Satisfy You (Sweethearts of the Rodeo song) =

Single by Sweethearts of the Rodeo

from the album One Time, One Night
- B-side: "One Time, One Night"
- Released: April 2, 1988
- Genre: Country
- Length: 2:40
- Label: Columbia
- Songwriter(s): Janis Oliver, Don Schlitz
- Producer(s): Steve Buckingham

Sweethearts of the Rodeo singles chronology
| "Gotta Get Away" (1987) | "Satisfy You" (1988) | "Blue to the Bone" (1988) |

"Satisfy You" is a song written by Janis Oliver and Don Schlitz, and recorded by American country music duo Sweethearts of the Rodeo. It was released in April 1988 as the first single from the album One Time, One Night. The song reached #5 on the Billboard Hot Country Singles & Tracks chart, the Sweethearts of the Rodeo's fourth best performance overall in the US charts for a single. As of December 2020, it has over one million views on its YouTube music video.

== Charts ==
=== Weekly charts ===
| Chart (1988) | Peak position |
|---|---|
| US Hot Country Songs (Billboard) | 5 |
| Canadian RPM Country Tracks | 11 |

=== Year-end charts ===
| Chart (1988) | Position |
|---|---|
| US Hot Country Songs (Billboard) | 70 |
