= Sweethearts of the Rodeo =

American country music duo

- Origin: Los Angeles, California, U.S.
- Genres: Country
- Years active: 1985–1996, 2010–2012
- Labels: Columbia, Sugar Hill
- Past members: Janis Oliver; Kristine Arnold

Sweethearts of the Rodeo was an American country music duo from Los Angeles, California. The duo consisted of sisters Janis Oliver and Kristine Arnold (née Oliver), both of whom were vocalists. The duo recorded for Columbia Records between 1986 and 1991, releasing four albums and twelve singles for the label. During the 1990s, they recorded two albums for Sugar Hill Records. The duo reached Top Ten on the Hot Country Songs chart seven times in the late 1980s, with their highest-charting singles being the No. 4 hits "Midnight Girl/Sunset Town" and "Chains of Gold", both in 1987.

== Background ==
Janis Oliver was born March 1, 1954 (age 72), and her sister Kristine Arnold was born November 28, 1956 (age 69), in the South Bay region of Los Angeles. They grew up in Manhattan Beach, California, sang in elementary school, and performed bluegrass music as the Oliver Sisters as teenagers.

The duo became Sweethearts of the Rodeo, taking the name from The Byrds' album Sweetheart of the Rodeo. After their discovery by Emmylou Harris, they secured slots as opening acts and backing vocalists for other artists. In 1977, the Sweethearts opened a Redondo Beach, California, show for the group Sundance fronted by Byron Berline, a group including 19-year-old Vince Gill. In 1980, Janis married Gill, by then a member of Pure Prairie League, Kristine married Leonard Arnold of the band Blue Steel. In 1983, the Gills moved to Nashville followed by the Arnolds, with the sisters singing together again.

== 1986–1992: Columbia Records ==
In 1985, Sweethearts of the Rodeo won the Wrangler Country Showdown talent contest, then signed with Columbia Records. Sweethearts of the Rodeo's first single, "Hey Doll Baby", debuted in April 1986, followed by the release their self-titled debut album. Then came the duo's first Top Ten hit at No. 7, "Since I Found You". The song was written by Radney Foster and Bill Lloyd, and its success helped Foster & Lloyd secure a recording contract. Four more singles from the album followed, including the No. 4 hits "Midnight Girl/Sunset Town" and "Chains of Gold", their highest-charting singles.

A second album, One Time, One Night furnished three more Top Ten hits: "Satisfy You", "Blue to the Bone", and a cover of The Beatles' "I Feel Fine", but their next single, "If I Never See Midnight Again", peaked at No. 39. Two more albums for Columbia were next, 1990's Buffalo Zone and 1992's Sisters, but neither had major hits. Columbia dropped the duo in 1992.

== 1993–present ==
Sweethearts of the Rodeo continued to tour in the 1990s, releasing two albums of bluegrass music on the Sugar Hill label: Rodeo Waltz in 1993 and Beautiful Lies in 1996. Janis and Kristine owned a clothing store in Franklin, Tennessee, called "Gill & Arnold" in the late 1990s, then closed it. Janis and Vince Gill were divorced in 1997. She married Roy Cummins in 2000 and they divorced in 2010.

== Discography ==
=== Albums ===
Year	Title	US Country	Label
1986	Sweethearts of the Rodeo	8	Columbia Records
1988	One Time, One Night	11	Columbia Records
1990	Buffalo Zone	41	Columbia Records
1992	Sisters	—	Columbia Records
1993	Rodeo Waltz	—	Sugar Hill Records
1996	Beautiful Lies	—	Sugar Hill Records
2000	Anthology	—	Renaissance
2012	Restless	—	Good Trade

=== Singles ===
Year	Single	Peak positions		Album
Year	Single	US Country	CAN Country	Album
1986	"Hey Doll Baby"	21	—	Sweethearts of the Rodeo
1986	"Since I Found You"	7	15	Sweethearts of the Rodeo
1986	"Midnight Girl/Sunset Town"	4	6	Sweethearts of the Rodeo
1987	"Chains of Gold"	4	7	Sweethearts of the Rodeo
1987	"Gotta Get Away"	10	11	Sweethearts of the Rodeo
1988	"Satisfy You"	5	11	One Time, One Night
1988	"Blue to the Bone"	5	8	One Time, One Night
1988	"I Feel Fine"	9	12	One Time, One Night
1989	"If I Never See Midnight Again"	39	40	One Time, One Night
1990	"This Heart"	25	32	Buffalo Zone
1990	"Cómo Se Dice (I Love You)"	—	—	Buffalo Zone
1990	"What It Does to Me"	—	—	Buffalo Zone
1990	"You Look at Love That Way"	—	—	Buffalo Zone
1991	"Hard-Headed Man"	63	—	Sisters
1991	"Devil and Your Deep Blue Eyes"	74	—	Sisters
1993	"Things Will Grow"	—	—	Rodeo Waltz
1996	"Beautiful Lies"	—	—	Beautiful Lies
"—" denotes releases that did not chart

=== Music videos ===
Year	Video	Director
1986	"Since I Found You"	not available
1986	"Midnight Girl/Sunset Town"	not available
1988	"Satisfy You"	Bob Small
1989	"If I Never See Midnight Again"	Bob Small
1990	"Cómo Se Dice (I Love You)"	Deaton Flanigen
1990	"You Look at Love That Way"	Deaton Flanigen
1991	"Devil and Your Deep Blue Eyes"	Peter Lippman
1993	"Things Will Grow"	Steve Boyle
1996	"Beautiful Lies"	Chris Rogers
