= Sweethearts of the Rodeo (album) =

Studio album by Sweethearts of the Rodeo
- Released: 1986
- Studio: The Bennett House, Franklin, TN Bayside Recording Studio, Nashville, TN
- Genre: Country
- Length: 23:43
- Label: Columbia
- Producer: Steve Buckingham, Hank DeVito

Sweethearts of the Rodeo chronology
Sweethearts of the Rodeo (1986)	One Time, One Night (1988)

Singles from Sweethearts of the Rodeo
- 1. "Since I Found You" Released: July 26, 1986; 2. "Midnight Girl/Sunset Town" Released: November 29, 1986; 3. "Chains of Gold" Released: April 4, 1987; 4. "Gotta Get Away" Released: September 12, 1987

Sweethearts of the Rodeo is the debut studio album by American country music duo Sweethearts of the Rodeo. Five of the tracks would rise into the Billboard Hot Country Singles chart. "Midnight Girl/Sunset Town" and "Chains of Gold" both achieved a #4 rating, while "Since I Found You" made it to #7, "Gotta Get Away" to #10, and a cover of "Hey Doll Baby", made famous by The Everly Brothers, was at #21.

== Critical reception ==
Professional ratings
Review scores
Source	Rating
Allmusic	4.5/5 stars

In his Allmusic review, critic Mark Humphrey called the album "good vocal harmony on contemporary, rock-tinged country."

== Track listing ==
No.	Title	Writer(s)	Length
1.	"Midnight Girl/Sunset Town"	Don Schlitz	3:03
2.	"Hey Doll Baby"	Titus Turner	2:30
3.	"Since I Found You"	Radney Foster, Bill Lloyd	2:45
4.	"Gotta Get Away"	Janis Oliver	3:00
5.	"Chains of Gold"	Paul Kennerley	2:53
6.	"Chosen Few"	John Hall, Schlitz	3:09
7.	"Everywhere "I Turn"	Oliver, Michael G. Joyce	3:08
8.	"I Can't Resist"	Hank DeVito, Rodney Crowell	2:45

=== Sweethearts of the Rodeo ===
- Kristine Arnold – vocals
- Janis Gill – vocals, acoustic guitar

=== Musicians ===
- Michael Rhodes – bass
- Eddie Bayers – drums
- Harry Stinson – drums
- Roy Huskey Jr. – upright bass
- Billy Joe Walker Jr. – guitar
- Gregg Galbraith – guitar
- Larry Byrom – guitar
- Steve Gibson – guitar, mandolin
- Vince Gill – guitar
- David Innis – keyboards
- John Jarvis – keyboards
- Shane Keister – keyboards
- Hank DeVito – steel guitar

== Chart performance ==
Chart (1986)	Peak position
U.S. Billboard Top Country Albums	8
