= Willin' (album) =

Studio album by Jon Randall
- Released: September 21, 1999
- Genre: Country
- Label: Eminent
- Producer: Jon Randall

Jon Randall chronology
What You Don't Know (1995)	Willin' (1999)	Walking Among the Living (2005)

Professional ratings
Review scores
Source	Rating
Allmusic	4/5 stars

Willin' is the second studio album released by American country music singer Jon Randall. It was released in 1999 via the independent Eminent label. Randall wrote or co-wrote ten of the eleven songs on the album and produced it, the sole exception being the title track. No singles were released from it.

== Track listing ==
All songs written by Jon Randall except where noted.

1. "Baby Make the Sun Go Down" (Jon Randall, Mark Winchester) – 2:58
2. "Can't Find the Words" – 3:32
3. "Willin'" (Lowell George) – 3:45
4. "Can't Hurt Anymore" – 4:32
5. "Mountain of Regret" – 3:51
6. "Afraid of the Dark" – 5:07
7. "Sweet Loretta" – 3:57
8. "Blew Me Away" – 3:38
9. "Walk the Line" – 3:50
10. "Breakin' the Rules" – 4:05
11. "Lonely Street" – 5:26

== Personnel ==
- Larry Atamanuik – drums
- Tom Britt – slide guitar
- Sam Bush – mandolin, background vocals
- Steve Conn – accordion Hammond B-3 organ, Wurlitzer electric piano
- John Cowan – bass guitar, background vocals
- Jerry Douglas – Dobro, lap steel guitar
- Emmylou Harris – background vocals
- Monty Hitchcock – tambourine
- Roy Huskey, Jr. – upright bass
- Richard McLaurin – electric guitar, Hammond B-3 organ, shaker
- Lorrie Morgan – background vocals
- Tim O'Brien – background vocals
- Al Perkins – lap steel guitar
- Dave Pomeroy – bass guitar
- Jon Randall – acoustic guitar, 12-string guitar, electric guitar, percussion, vocals
- Kim Richey – background vocals
- Randy Stewart – acoustic guitar, background vocals
- Harry Stinson – drums, percussion, background vocals
- Brent Truitt – acoustic guitar, electric guitar, percussion, papoose, mandolin
- Kenny Vaughan – electric guitar
- Scott Vestal – banjo
