= Since I Found You =

Single by Sweethearts of the Rodeo

from the album Sweethearts of the Rodeo
- B-side: "Chosen Few"
- Released: July 26, 1986
- Genre: Country
- Length: 2:45
- Label: Columbia
- Songwriter(s): Radney Foster, Bill Lloyd
- Producer(s): Steve Buckingham

Sweethearts of the Rodeo singles chronology
"Hey Doll Baby" (1986)	"Since I Found You" (1986)	"Midnight Girl/Sunset Town" (1986)

"Since i Found You" is a song written by Radney Foster and Bill Lloyd, and recorded by American country music duo Sweethearts of the Rodeo. It was released in July 1986 as the second single from the album Sweethearts of the Rodeo. The song reached #7 on the Billboard Hot Country Singles & Tracks chart. The song was also featured as the opening and closing theme of the romantic comedy, Nadine, starring Kim Basinger and Jeff Bridges.

== Chart performance ==
Chart (1986)	Peak position
US Hot Country Songs (Billboard)	7
Canadian RPM Hot Country Tracks	15
