= Jon Randall =

American musician and producer (born 1969)

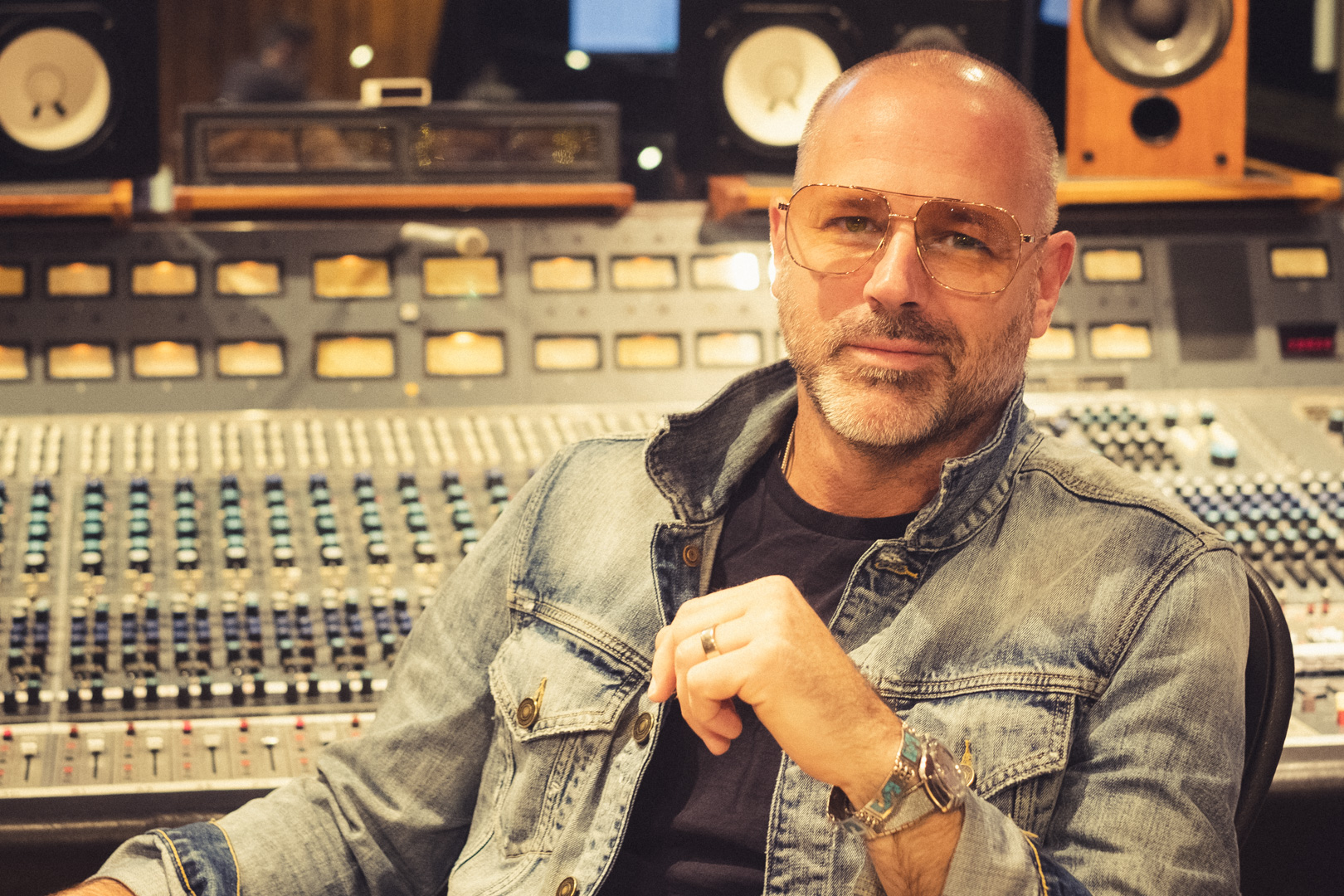
- Randall at Blackbird Studios, Nashville, TN 2020

Background information
- Born: Jon Randall Stewart; February 17, 1969 (age 57)
- Origin: Duncanville, Texas, U.S.
- Genre: Country
- Occupation: Singer-songwriter
- Instruments: Vocals, guitar, mandolin
- Years active: 1992–present
- Labels: RCA Nashville, Asylum, Eminent, Epic
- Spouse(s): Lorrie Morgan (m. 1996; div. 1999) Jessi Alexander (m. 2006)

Jon Randall Stewart (born February 17, 1969) is an American producer, songwriter and musician.

His career began as a guitarist for Emmylou Harris' Nash Ramblers with whom he won his first Grammy for their Live at the Ryman album in 1992. Between 1995 and 2005 Randall released three solo albums, What You Don't Know, Willin' and Walking Among the Living. He recorded a fourth album, Cold Coffee Morning, which was not released.

As a songwriter, Randall has had many notable cuts including "Whiskey Lullaby" recorded by Brad Paisley and Alison Krauss which won the 2005 CMA Song of the Year Award, and “Tin Man” by Miranda Lambert which won the 2018 ACM Song of the Year Award. He has also had cuts with Reba McEntire, Emmylou Harris, Maren Morris, Dierks Bentley, Kenny Chesney, Kip Moore, Brad Paisley, Scotty McCreery, Guy Clark, Little Big Town, Gary Allan and Travis Denning.

Randall produced Dierks Bentley's Up on the Ridge (2010) which was nominated for the 2011 Grammy Award for Best Country Album, and The Mountain (2018). Both albums were nominated for ACM and CMA Album of the Year. Randall's production on The Mountain's "Burning Man ft. Brothers Osborne" also earned him the 2019 ACM Award for Music Event of the Year. Other artists he has produced records for include: Dwight Yoakam, Jack Ingram, Pat Green, Nitty Gritty Dirt Band, Jessi Alexander and Parker McCollum.

Randall has been nominated for 5 Grammy Awards, 5 Academy of Country Music Awards and 6 Country Music Association Awards. See Awards section below.

On February 19, 2021, Randall released his first single in over 15 years, "Keep On Moving", co-produced, engineered and mixed by Brandon Bell. On April 2, 2021, Randall released a four-track solo project called Neon Texas.

== Music career ==
=== Emmylou Harris and The Nash Ramblers ===
Randall's music career began as a guitarist for Emmylou Harris’ Nash Ramblers.

In 1992, Randall won a Grammy award under the winner name 'Emmylou Harris & The Nash Ramblers (Larry Altamanuik, Sam Bush, Roy Huskey, Jr., Al Perkins, Jon Randall Stewart)' for Best Country Performance by a Duo or Group with Vocal. The award was for the album Live at the Ryman.

In 2017, Harris, Randall, Bush and Perkins reunited at The Ryman Auditorium for a 25th anniversary concert of the "Live at the Ryman" album .

=== Artist career ===
Between 1995 and 2005 Randall released four solo albums, What You Don't Know, Cold Coffee Morning, Willin' and Walking Among the Living. The singles "Cold Coffee Morning" and "This Heart" both made appearances on the Billboard Hot Country Songs Charts.

On February 19, 2021, Stewart released his first single in over 15 years, "Keep On Moving", co-produced, engineered and mixed by Brandon Bell. On April 2, 2021, Stewart released a four-track solo project called Neon Texas.

=== Miranda Lambert, Jack Ingram & Jon Randall ===
On March 4, 2021, "In His Arms" was released collaboratively with Miranda Lambert and Jack Ingram. The single was accompanied by an announcement that the artists would be releasing a joint project called The Marfa Tapes on May 7, 2021, from which "In His Arms" was the first single. The project is a collection of raw live recordings from a trip to Marfa, Texas.

On March 12, 2021, The Marfa Tapes track "Tin Man" was released, followed by the release of "Am I Right or Amarillo" on March 26, 2021.

The Marfa Tapes received a Grammy Award nomination for Best Country Album at the 64th Annual Grammy Awards.

=== 18 South ===
Randall is also a member of 18 South, a culmination of acclaimed songwriters and Nashville's best session musicians consisting of Jessi Alexander, Jimmy Wallace, Mike Bub, Larry Atamanuik and Guthrie Trapp. In 2010 they released their debut album Soulful Southern Roots Music.

=== Brad Paisley with Alison Krauss ===
Randall co-wrote the song "Whiskey Lullaby" with Bill Anderson, which was released by Brad Paisley as a duet with Alison Krauss in 2004. The song received multiple award nominations, won the 2005 CMA Song Of The Year Award, and peak at No. 3 on the Billboard Hot Country Singles & Tracks (now Hot Country Songs) charts, and No. 41 on the Billboard Hot 100. As of July 2015, "Whiskey Lullaby" was certified 2× Platinum by the Recording Industry Association of America.

=== Dierks Bentley ===
Randall produced Dierks Bentley's Up on the Ridge (2010) and The Mountain (2018).

Up on the Ridge was nominated for a Grammy Award for Best Country Album, and nominated for the ACM and CMA Album Of The Year. The album debuted at No. 9 on the U.S. Billboard 200, No. 2 on the Billboard Top Country Albums chart, and at No. 1 on the U.S. Billboard Bluegrass Albums charts. The second single from the album, "Draw Me a Map" was co-written by Bentley and Randall, and peaked at No. 33 on the Billboard Hot Country Songs.

Co-produced with Ross Copperman, The Mountain was nominated for both the ACM and CMA Album of the Year. Their production on The Mountain's "Burning Man ft. Brothers Osborne" also earned them the 2019 ACM Award for Music Event of the Year. The Mountain debuted at No. 1 on Billboard's Top Country Albums and No. 3 on the Billboard 200 charts.

=== Miranda Lambert ===
In 2017 Miranda Lambert released "Tin Man" which Stewart co-wrote with Lambert and Jack Ingram. The song won the 2018 ACM Song of the Year Award, and was also nominated for the 2017 CMA Song of the Year and 2018 Grammy Award for Best Country Song. As of February 2019, "Tin Man" received platinum certification by the Recording Industry Association of America.

In 2021 Miranda Lambert released her single, "If I Was A Cowboy" which was co-produced by Randall and Luke Dick.

=== Jack Ingram ===
Randall produced Jack Ingram's last two albums, Midnight Motel (2016) and Ridin' High... Again (2019).

Ridin' High... Again also includes Ingram's rendition of "Tin Man", written by Randall, Ingram, and Miranda Lambert, which was previously released by Lambert and earned the three writers the 2018 ACM Song of the Year Award. Ingram and Randall also co-wrote "Where There's a Willie" and "Everybody Wants to Be Somebody" (along with Todd Snider).

=== Parker McCollum ===
In 2020, Randall produced Parker McCollum’s EP Hollywood Gold, with the lead single "Pretty Heart" achieving platinum certification. He also co-wrote "Love You Like That" with Parker McCollum and Billy Montana. In 2021, Parker McCollum released his current record "Gold Chain Cowboy" which was produced by Jon Randall.

=== Chase Bryant ===
On February 26, 2021, Chase Bryant released "Upbringing" the lead single from his upcoming album of the same name. The song was written by Bryant, Randall and Stephen Wilson, produced by Randall and recorded at Arlyn Studios in Austin, TX.

== Awards ==
Year	Organization	Artist/Work	Award	Result
2022	ACM Awards	Miranda Lambert, Jack Ingram & Jon Randall - The Marfa Tapes	Album of the Year	Nomination
2019	ACM Awards	Dierks Bentley Featuring Brothers Osborne - Burning Man	Music Event of the Year	Won
2019	ACM Awards	Dierks Bentley - The Mountain	Album of the Year	Nomination
2018	CMA Awards	Dierks Bentley - The Mountain	Album of the Year	Nomination
2018	ACM Awards	Miranda Lambert - Tin Man	Song of the Year	Won
2018	Grammy Awards	Miranda Lambert - Tin Man	Best Country Song	Nomination
2017	CMA Awards	Miranda Lambert - Tin Man	Song of the Year	Nomination
2011	Grammy Awards	Dierks Bentley - Up on the Ridge	Best Country Album	Nomination
2011	ACM Awards	Dierks Bentley - Up on the Ridge	Album of the Year	Nomination
2010	CMA Awards	Dierks Bentley - Up on the Ridge	Album of the Year	Nomination
2008	Grammy Awards	Earl Scruggs with Family and Friends - The Ultimate Collection/Live at the Ryman	Best Bluegrass Album	Nomination
2005	CMA Awards	Brad Paisley with Alison Krauss - Whiskey Lullaby	Song of the Year	Won
2004	CMA Awards	Brad Paisley with Alison Krauss - Whiskey Lullaby	Song of the Year	Nomination
2004	ACM Awards	Brad Paisley with Alison Krauss - Whiskey Lullaby	Song of the Year	Nomination
1997	ACM Awards	Lorrie Morgan & Jon Randall	Vocal Duo of the Year	Nomination
1997	TNN/Music City News Country Awards	Lorrie Morgan & Jon Randall - By My Side	Vocal Collaboration of the Year	Won
1992	Grammy Awards	Emmylou Harris & The Nash Ramblers - Emmylou Harris & The Nash Ramblers at the Ryman	Best Country Performance by a Duo or Group with Vocal	Won
1992	Grammy Awards	Emmylou Harris & The Nash Ramblers - Scotland	Best Country Instrumental Performance	Nominated

== Artist discography ==
=== Studio albums ===
Title	Album details
What You Don't Know	Release date: June 27, 1995; Label: RCA Nashville
Willin'	Release date: September 21, 1999; Label: Eminent Records
Walking Among the Living	Release date: September 20, 2005; Label: Epic Records
The Marfa Tapes (with Miranda Lambert and Jack Ingram)	Release date: May 7, 2021; Label: RCA Nashville
Great Day to Be Alive	Release date: October 27, 2023; Label: Sony

=== Singles ===
Year	Single	Peak positions			Album
Year	Single	US Country	US Bubbling	CAN Country	Album
1994	"I Came Straight to You"	—	—	—	What You Don't Know
1994	"This Heart"	74	—	—	What You Don't Know
1996	"By My Side" (with Lorrie Morgan)	18	10	21	Greater Need
1998	"She Don't Believe in Fairy Tales"	—	—	—	Cold Coffee Morning (unreleased)
1999	"Cold Coffee Morning"	71	—	—	Cold Coffee Morning (unreleased)
1999	"Willin'"	—	—	—	Willin'
2005	"Baby Won't You Come Home"	—	—	—	Walking Among the Living
2005	"I Shouldn't Do This"	—	—	—	Walking Among the Living
2020	"Keep On Moving"	—	—	—	Non-album single
"—" denotes releases that did not chart

=== Music videos ===
Year	Video	Director
1994	"I Came Straight to You"	R. Brad Murano/Steven T. Miller
1994	"This Heart"	Joanne Gardner
1998	"She Don't Believe in Fairy Tales"	Trey Fanjoy
2005	"Baby Won't You Come Home"	Trey Fanjoy

== Songwriting and production discography ==
American record producer and songwriter, Jon Randall, has released four studio albums as a solo artist. He has produced for artists including Dierks Bentley, Dwight Yoakam, Pat Green, Nitty Gritty Dirt Band, Jessi Alexander, and Parker McCollum. His extensive list of cuts also includes Miranda Lambert, Reba McEntire, Emmylou Harris, Maren Morris, Dierks Bentley, Kenny Chesney, Kip Moore, Brad Paisley, Scotty McCreery, Guy Clark, Little Big Town, Gary Allan and Travis Denning.

=== Producer ===
Year	Artist	Album	Label
2025	William Beckmann	Whiskey Lies & Alibis	Warner Music Nashville
2021	Chase Bryant	Upbringing	Green Iris Records
2020	Parker McCollum	Hollywood Gold	MCA Nashville
2020	Jessi Alexander	Decatur County Red	
2019	Jack Ingram	Ridin' High...Again	Beat Up Ford Records
2018	Dierks Bentley	The Mountain	Capitol Records Nashville
2016	Jack Ingram	Midnight Motel	Rounder Records
2016	Dwight Yoakam	Swimmin' Pools, Movie Stars...	Sugar Hill Records
2013	Darden Smith	Love Calling	
2010	Dierks Bentley	Up on the Ridge	Capitol Records Nashville
2009	Nitty Gritty Dirt Band	Speed of Life	NGDB Records

=== Songwriter ===
Year	Artist	Album	Song	Written with
2020	Parker McCollum	Hollywood Gold	Love You Like That	Parker McCollum, Billy Montana
2019	Miranda Lambert	Wildcard	Tequila Does	Miranda Lambert, Jack Ingram
2019	Miranda Lambert	Wildcard	Pretty Bitchin'	Luke Dick, Natalie Hemby, Miranda Lambert
2019	Maren Morris	Girl	RSVP	Natalie Hemby, Maren Morris, Mark Trussell
2018	Dierks Bentley	The Mountain	The Mountain	Dierks Bentley, Luke Dick, Natalie Hemby
2018	Dierks Bentley	The Mountain	Son of the Sun	Dierks Bentley, Ross Copperman, Jon Nite
2018	Dierks Bentley	The Mountain	How I'm Going Out	Jessi Alexander
2017	Kip Moore	Slowheart	The Bull	Luke Dick
2016	Miranda Lambert	The Weight of These Wings	Tin Man	Miranda Lambert, Jack Ingram
2016	Blake Shelton	If I'm on Honest	Savior's Shadow	Jessi Alexander & Blake Shelton
2016	Ronnie Dunn	Tattooed Heart	Still Feels Like Mexico	Tommy Lee James
2016	Sam Bush	Storyman	Bowling Green	Sam Bush
2016	Sam Bush	Storyman	I Just Wanna Feel Something	Sam Bush
2015	Pat Green	Home	Girls from Texas featuring Lyle Lovett	Shane McAnally
2013	Scotty McCreery	See You Tonight	Carolina Moon	Ron Stewart, Ronnie Stewart
2012	Dierks Bentley	Home	Am I the Only One	Dierks Bentley, Jim Beavers
2012	Dierks Bentley	Home	The Woods	Dierks Bentley, Jaren Johnston
2012	Jerry Douglas	Traveler	Frozen Fields	Jeff Black
2011	Blake Shelton	Red River Blue	Drink On It	Jessi Alexander, Rodney Clawson
2010	Dierks Bentley	Up on the Ridge	Rovin' Gambler	Dierks Bentley
2010	Dierks Bentley	Up on the Ridge	Draw Me a Map	Dierks Bentley
2010	Dierks Bentley	Up on the Ridge	Down in the Mine	Dierks Bentley
2010	Dierks Bentley	Up on the Ridge	You're Dead to Me	Dierks Bentley, Tim O'Brien
2010	Reba McEntire	All the Women I Am	When Love Gets a Hold of You	Jessi Alexander, Gary Nicholson
2009	Patty Loveless	Mountain Soul II	You Burned the Bridge	
2007	Gary Allan	Living Hard	She's So California	Gary Allan, Jaime Hanna
2007	Reba McEntire	Reba: Duets	Break Each Other's Hearts Again featuring Don Henley	John Wiggins
2007	Kenny Chesney	Just Who I Am: Poets & Pirates	Demons	
2007	Little Big Town	A Place to Land	Firebird Fly	Jessi Alexander
2007	Little Big Town	A Place to Land	Lovely Enough	Jessi Alexander
2004	Sam Bush	King of My World	Puppies 'n Knapsacks	Sam Bush, Byron House
2003	Brad Paisley	Mud on the Tires	Whiskey Lullaby featuring Alison Krauss	Bill Anderson
1999	Guy Clark	Cold Dog Soup	Ain't No Trouble to Me	Guy Clark
1999	Guy Clark	Cold Dog Soup	Die Tryin'	Guy Clark
1998	Sam Bush	Howlin' at the Moon	Song for Roy	Sam Bush

== Personal life ==
Randall was married to Lorrie Morgan from 1996 to 1999.

He has been married to Jessi Alexander since 2006 and they have three children.
