= List of Top Country Albums number ones of 2003 =

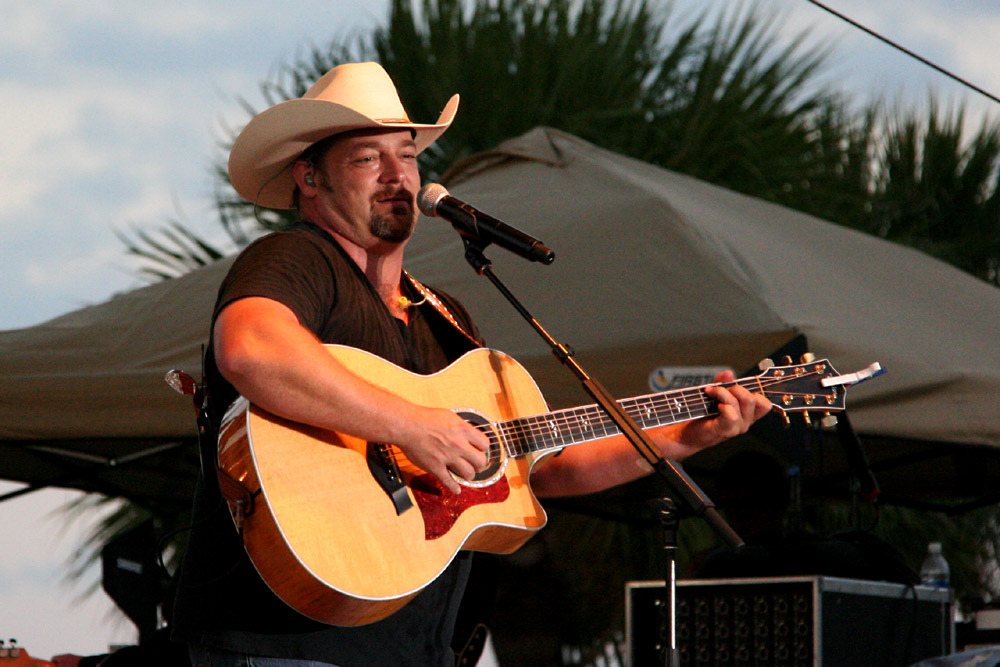
Chris Cagle had his first number one in 2003 with his eponymous album.

Top Country Albums is a chart that ranks the top-performing country music albums in the United States, published by Billboard. In 2003, 16 different albums topped the chart, based on electronic point of sale data provided by SoundScan Inc.

In the issue of Billboard dated January 4, Shania Twain was at number one with Up!, the album's fifth week in the top spot. It spent two weeks atop the listing in 2003 before being displaced by Home by the Dixie Chicks, which regained the peak position having first reached number one in 2002. Home spent fourteen non-consecutive weeks at number one during 2003, making it the year's longest-running chart-topper and the all-female trio the act with the most weeks in the top spot during the year. It was the group's third consecutive album to win the Grammy Award for Best Country Album. The only act to have more than one chart-topping album in 2003 was Toby Keith, who engaged in a public feud with the Dixie Chicks in the early part of the year after the group's lead singer Natalie Maines made controversial comments about then-United States President George W. Bush, which led to many country music radio stations refusing to play their songs. Keith topped the chart with both Unleashed and Shock'n Y'all, which was the final number one of the year.

Four acts topped the chart for the first time in 2003. In April, Chris Cagle interrupted the Dixie Chicks' time at number one for a single week and gained his first chart-topper with his eponymous album. In July, another self-titled album gave Buddy Jewell his first number one, two months after he won the first season of the TV singing contest Nashville Star. In July, Trace Adkins reached the top of the chart for the first time with Greatest Hits Collection, Vol. 1, one of several greatest hits albums to reach number one during the year. Two weeks later, Brad Paisley gained his first number one with Mud on the Tires; Paisley would go on to be one of the biggest new country stars of the early 21st century. In contrast to the four first-time chart-toppers, George Strait gained his 18th number one with Honkytonkville, extending his record for the highest number of chart-toppers in the listing's history.

== Chart history ==
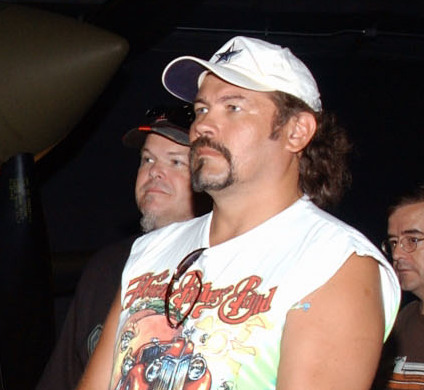
Buddy Jewell topped the chart after winning the first season of TV show Nashville Star.

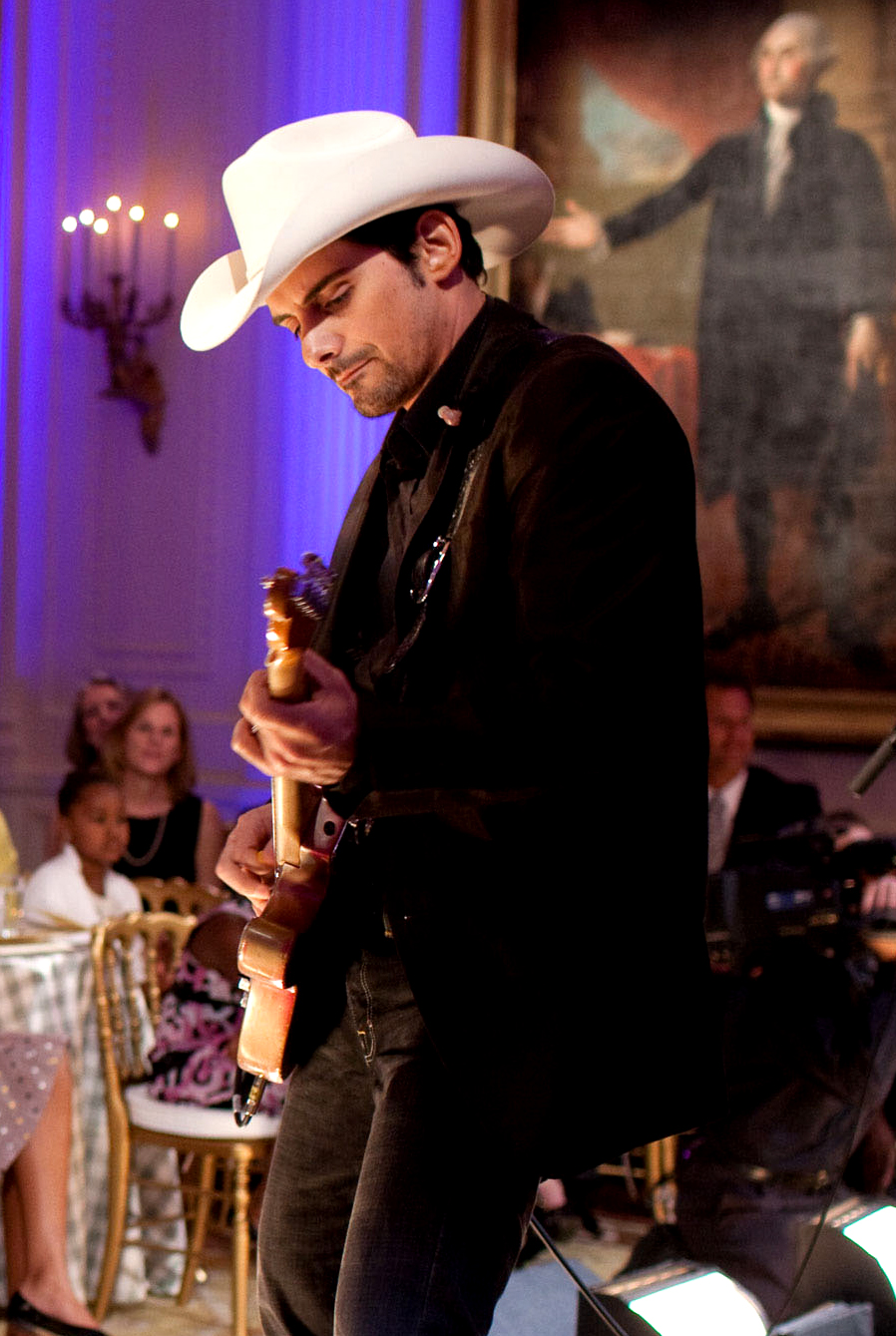
Mud on the Tires was the first number one for Brad Paisley.

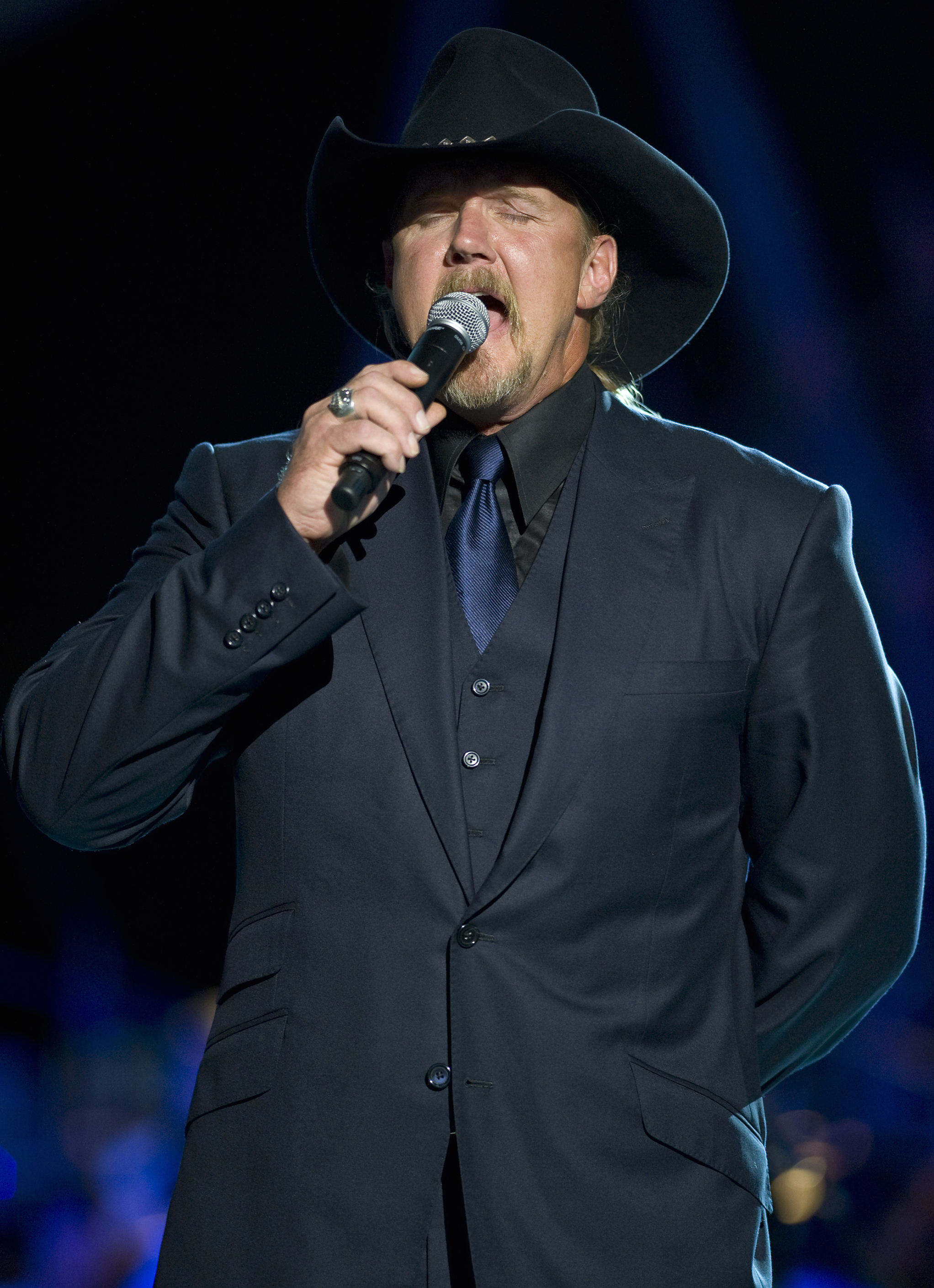
Trace Adkins was one of a number of artists to top the chart with a greatest hits album.

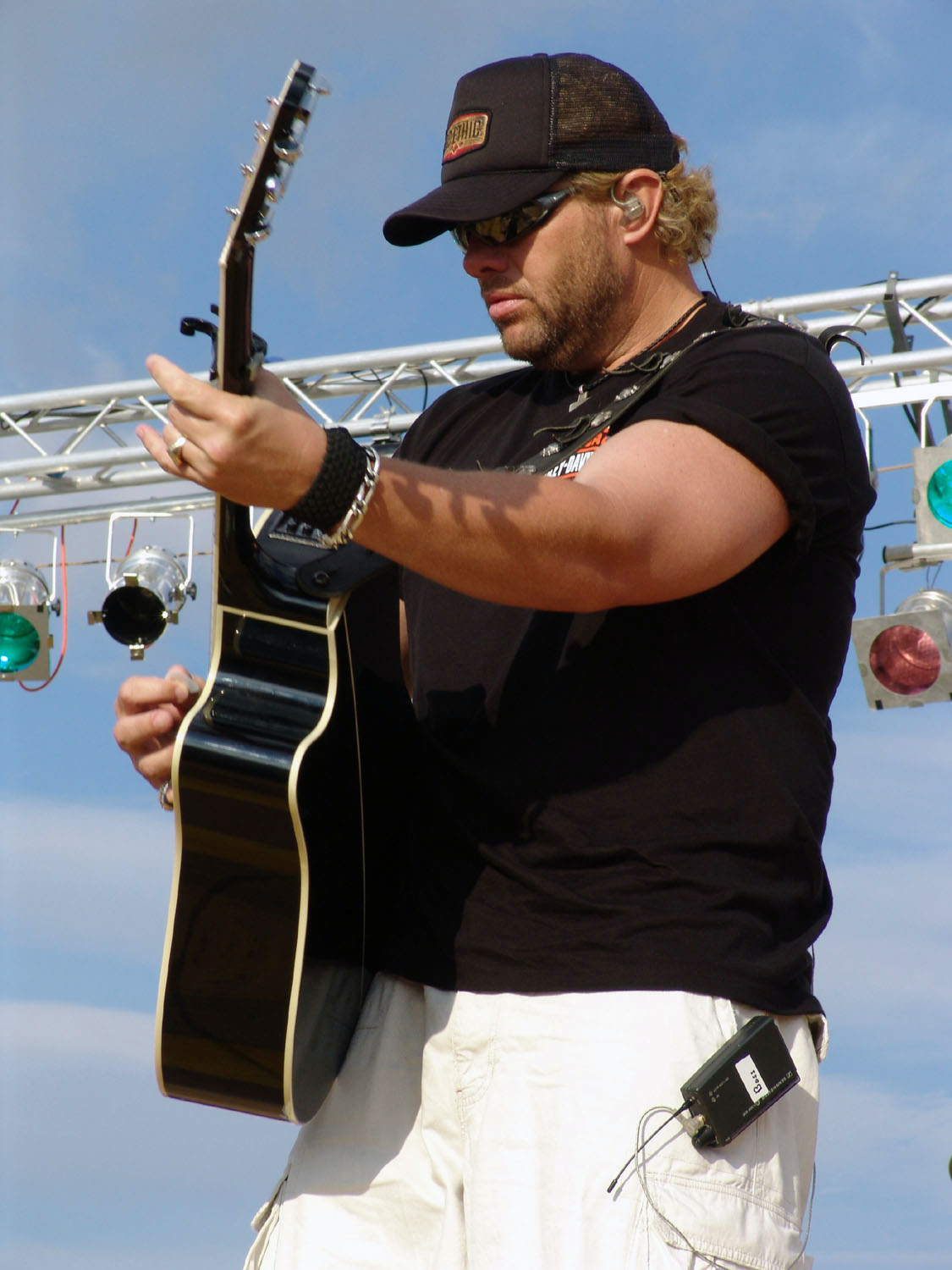
Toby Keith was the only act to achieve two number ones in 2003.

Issue date	Title	Artist(s)	Ref.
January 4	Up!	Shania Twain	
January 11	Up!	Shania Twain	
January 18	Home	Dixie Chicks	
January 25	Home	Dixie Chicks	
February 1	Home	Dixie Chicks	
February 8	Home	Dixie Chicks	
February 15	Home	Dixie Chicks	
February 22	Home	Dixie Chicks	
March 1	Home	Dixie Chicks	
March 8	Home	Dixie Chicks	
March 15	Home	Dixie Chicks	
March 22	Home	Dixie Chicks	
March 29	Home	Dixie Chicks	
April 5	Home	Dixie Chicks	
April 12	Home	Dixie Chicks	
April 19	Chris Cagle	Chris Cagle	
April 26	Home	Dixie Chicks	
May 3	Have You Forgotten?	Darryl Worley	
May 10	Have You Forgotten?	Darryl Worley	
May 17	Have You Forgotten?	Darryl Worley	
May 24	Have You Forgotten?	Darryl Worley	
May 31	Unleashed	Toby Keith	
June 7	Greatest Hits	Jo Dee Messina	
June 14	Unleashed	Toby Keith	
June 21	From There to Here: Greatest Hits	Lonestar	
June 28	Honkytonkville	George Strait	
July 5	Honkytonkville	George Strait	
July 12	From There to Here: Greatest Hits	Lonestar	
July 19	Buddy Jewell	Buddy Jewell	
July 26	Greatest Hits Collection, Vol. 1	Trace Adkins	
August 2	Red Dirt Road	Brooks & Dunn	
August 9	Mud on the Tires	Brad Paisley	
August 16	Mud on the Tires	Brad Paisley	
August 23	What the World Needs Now Is Love	Wynonna	
August 30	Greatest Hits Volume II (And Some Other Stuff)	Alan Jackson	
September 6	Greatest Hits Volume II (And Some Other Stuff)	Alan Jackson	
September 13	Greatest Hits Volume II (And Some Other Stuff)	Alan Jackson	
September 20	Greatest Hits Volume II (And Some Other Stuff)	Alan Jackson	
September 27	Greatest Hits Volume II (And Some Other Stuff)	Alan Jackson	
October 4	Greatest Hits Volume II (And Some Other Stuff)	Alan Jackson	
October 11	Greatest Hits Volume II (And Some Other Stuff)	Alan Jackson	
October 18	Martina	Martina McBride	
October 25	Greatest Hits Volume II (And Some Other Stuff)	Alan Jackson	
November 1	Greatest Hits Volume II (And Some Other Stuff)	Alan Jackson	
November 8	Greatest Hits Volume II (And Some Other Stuff)	Alan Jackson	
November 15	Greatest Hits Volume II (And Some Other Stuff)	Alan Jackson	
November 22	Shock'n Y'all	Toby Keith	
November 29	Shock'n Y'all	Toby Keith	
December 6	Shock'n Y'all	Toby Keith	
December 13	Shock'n Y'all	Toby Keith	
December 20	Shock'n Y'all	Toby Keith	
December 27	Shock'n Y'all	Toby Keith	
