= Sixwire =

American country music band

- Origin: Nashville, Tennessee, United States
- Genres: Country, southern rock
- Years active: 2000–present
- Labels: Warner Bros. Nashville
- Members: Andy Childs; John Howard; Steve Mandile; Chuck Tilley; Steve Hornbeak
- Past members: Robb Houston
- Website: www.sixwire.com

Sixwire is an American country music band from Nashville, Tennessee, United States. The group consists of Andy Childs (lead vocals, guitar), Steve Hornbeak (keyboards, vocals), John Howard (bass guitar), Steve Mandile (guitar, vocals), and Chuck Tilley (drums, percussion). Robb Houston (rhythm guitar) was a former member. The band's name references the six strings on a guitar. Sixwire recorded one album for Warner Bros. Records in 2002, and charted two singles on the Billboard country charts, including the No. 30 hit "Look at Me Now". Five years later, they placed second on the talent show The Next Great American Band, and served as the house band on Can You Duet, another talent show.

== History ==
Before the band's formation, Andy Childs recorded for RCA Nashville from 1993 to 1994, releasing a self-titled debut album and charting three singles on the country charts. In addition, Steve Mandile co-wrote singles for Phil Vassar, Tim McGraw, and Shane McAnally, and previously played lead guitar in Pam Tillis' road band, Mystic Biscuit. Drummer Chuck Tilley has a jazz background. He graduated from the University of Alabama with a degree in Music Administration, where he studied with noted jazz educator Steve Sample, Sr. Following graduation, he worked in Birmingham, Alabama as a member of a jazz group led by Count Basie bassist Cleveland Eaton. Later, he moved to Nashville, Tennessee, where he worked as a session player and also toured and recorded with Lee Greenwood and Dolly Parton. Childs had initially declined to join the band but later reconsidered after Brett James had also declined.

The band was formed in 2000 and signed to Warner Bros. Records in 2002. Their debut single, "Look at Me Now", peaked at number 30 on the Billboard Hot Country Singles & Tracks (now Hot Country Songs) chart. It was included on Sixwire's self-titled debut album, which peaked at 38 on the Billboard Top Country Albums chart in 2002. The album's only other single, "Way Too Deep", peaked at number 55. Also in 2002, Sixwire appeared on the track "It Goes Like This" from then-labelmate John Michael Montgomery's album Pictures. Mandile co-produced Nashville Star 2005 winner Erika Jo's self-titled debut album, on which Tilley also performed as a percussionist. A sixth member, keyboardist Steve Hornbeak, also joined the band's lineup.

In 2007, Sixwire auditioned for the Fox Networks reality show The Next Great American Band and finished runner-up. One year later, Sixwire served as the house band on CMT's talent show Can You Duet.

At the 2024 Republican National Convention in Milwaukee, Sixwire performed as the house band. On the first day they played for nearly 45 consecutive minutes after a teleprompter malfunctioned, covering hits like "I Want You To Want Me" by Cheap Trick and several Doobie Brothers songs.

== Discography ==
=== Albums ===
Title	Album details	Peak chart positions	
Title	Album details	US Country	US Heat
Sixwire	Release date: July 30, 2002; Label: Warner Bros. Nashville	38	32

=== Singles ===
Year	Single	Peak positions	Album
Year	Single	US Country	Album
2002	"Look at Me Now"	30	Sixwire
2002	"Way Too Deep"	55	Sixwire

=== Music videos ===
Year	Video	Director
2002	"Look at Me Now"	Steven Goldmann
