= Nashville Star =

American reality television singing competition program

- Developed by: Ben Silverman; Howard Owens; Jeff Boggs; George Verschoor; Mark Koops
- Written by: Jason Hunt
- Directed by: Michael A. Simon
- Presented by: Nancy O'Dell (2003–2004); LeAnn Rimes (2005); Cledus T. Judd (2005); Wynonna (2006); Cowboy Troy (2006–2007); Jewel (2007); Billy Ray Cyrus (2008); Katie Cook (2008)
- Judges: Robert K. Oermann (2003); Tracy Gershon (2003–2004); Charlie Robison (2003); Billy Greenwood (2004); The Warren Brothers (2004); Phil Vassar (2005–2006); Anastasia Brown (2005–2007); Bret Michaels (2005); Randy Owen (2007); Blake Shelton (2007); John Rich (2008); Jewel (2008); Jeffrey Steele (2008)
- Country of origin: United States
- No. of episodes: 52

Production
- Executive producers: Ben Silverman; Jeff Boggs; H.T. Owens; George Verschoor; SallyAnn Salsano
- Producer: Jon Small
- Production location: Nashville, Tennessee
- Camera setup: Multi-camera
- Running time: Varies (most episodes 60 minutes)
- Production companies: Hoosick Falls Productions; 495 Productions; Reveille Productions; NBC Studios (2003–2004); NBC Universal Television Studio (2004–2007); Universal Media Studios (2008)

Original release
- Network: USA Network (2003–2007); NBC (2008)
- Release: March 8, 2003 – August 4, 2008

Related
- American Idol

Nashville Star is an American reality television singing competition program that aired for six seasons, from 2003 to 2008. Its first five seasons aired on USA Network, while the last season aired on NBC. Its five seasons on USA made it the longest-running competition series on cable television at the time. In Canada, the show aired on CMT through season 5, but moved to E! beginning with season 6. CMT in the United States reaired each episode in season 6.

It was similar to American Idol, in that performers had to sing to impress both celebrity judges and the public via call-in and/or internet votes. Unlike American Idol, however, the performers were limited to country music. This restriction was relaxed for Season 6, allowing for the finalists to choose from many genres of music, but the songs were arranged to maintain a country sound.

The show is credited with jump-starting the careers of singers Buddy Jewell, Miranda Lambert, Chris Young, and Kacey Musgraves among others. A Nashville Star-themed gifts and souvenirs shop featuring local items and city souvenirs opened in July 2008 at Nashville International Airport, one month before the show's final episode, and closed after over a decade.

== Show format ==
=== Comparisons to American Idol ===
In a format nearly identical to the final round of American Idol, finalists performed one song per week individually and face criticism and/or praise from a panel of three judges. At the end of the show, voting opened to the viewing public, who cast votes by calling a toll-free telephone number or logging on to the show's official website (texting was added as a voting option in 2008). The performer with the fewest votes was eliminated.

However, because Nashville Star aired only once per week, eliminations were not announced until the following week. The finalists who have not been eliminated are called in random order to the stage one by one to perform until there are only two remaining. At that point, one was called to perform and the other was eliminated for receiving the fewest votes from the previous week. The finalists did not know the order in which they would perform and had less than one minute to prepare once their names were called. No votes are tallied on the season finale.

Much like American Idol, the judges were present to offer criticism to the finalists in an attempt to sway the voting public. Unlike Idol, however, Nashville Star's judges did not participate in the preliminary auditions (leaving that task to the show's producers), but they did act as mentors to the finalists (beginning with the 2008 season). The audition process was not seen on-air on USA Network versions, except for the first season (2003 season), but portions of it was seen in a montage during the premiere of the NBC version. Beginning with the 2008 move to NBC, the judges did assist producers in narrowing the field from 50 to 12. Each season (except for 2005), the judges eliminated finalists based on consensus on the premiere episode without sending the vote to the public (the process continued for a few more episodes during the first two seasons).

Whereas American Idol generally elevated people off the street to stardom, Nashville Star finalists were usually already somehow involved in the country music industry, but may not have attained a record deal on a major label. Past finalists have included studio musicians, background singers, and independent artists. Finalists were usually songwriters, in addition to being singers. In each season, one episode was dedicated to songs written by the finalists. Nashville Star did not have the same age limits as American Idol, and performers in their 30s and 40s were finalists, although most were in their 20s.

Nashville Star always featured a live band, led by John Bohlinger.

==== Appearing on both shows in the same season ====
In 2006, several musicians appeared on both American Idol and Nashville Star. Kenny Rogers made appearances as a guest performer live on both shows within two weeks of each other. Also, Patti LaBelle appeared as a guest judge on Star one week after mentoring on Idol. David Foster did the same, although two weeks apart.

In 2007, five days after Jewel's debut as the new host of Nashville Star, she appeared as a guest judge on the season premiere of American Idol. The Idol segments, however, were taped several weeks before she was named host of Nashville Star.

=== Broadcast ===
Regular episodes of Nashville Star ran for 60 minutes each. The show occasionally had a longer runtime (90 or 120 minutes), usually on season premieres and finales. The first three seasons featured nine episodes each. The series' run was cut to eight episodes beginning in 2006.

Finalists lived together for the entire run of the show. During the first two seasons, the finalists lived in a large house near Nashville's Music Row. Beginning with the 2005 season, finalists shared a large suite at the Gaylord Opryland Resort & Convention Center. Excerpts of the finalists' interaction with each other in their living environment were often edited into the show.

In addition, most episodes included an established country music act making a guest appearance to perform a song.

Nashville Star was produced by Reveille Productions and originated live (except for each season's premiere episode, which was taped) from the now-demolished Acuff Theatre at the Opry Entertainment Complex in Nashville, Tennessee. The competition took place over the months of March and April in its first four seasons, though it moved to January and February for the 2007 season and to the summer months in 2008.

=== Prizes ===
The winner of Nashville Star received a recording contract (through Sony Music in Seasons 1 and 2, Universal South Records in Season 3, RCA Label Group in Season 4, and Warner Bros. Music in Seasons 5 and 6), a performance on the Grand Ole Opry, and a pickup truck (Chevrolet from 2005–2007, Toyota in 2008). The 2008 season was to also award the winner a performance at the 2008 Olympic Games in Beijing, China, though that was later canceled. The top four finalists each season were involved in "The Nashville Star Tour", in which they performed together on a tour of small venues for a few months following the season.

== Criticisms ==
Nashville Star was criticized from its inception as being an American Idol ripoff, but the show outlived many critics' initial predictions of failure.

Fifth-season judge Blake Shelton told the New York Times, "I think it's disastrous that there hasn't been a winner to go on to be a consistent star in Nashville. In order for the show to have credibility and for it to take another step, we need a Carrie Underwood to come out of it." Despite this, the show was a ratings hit for USA Network, and was moved to broadcast network television after five seasons.

== Controversies ==
In 2004, Mal Rodgers was eliminated by the judges during one of the early rounds, despite being an obvious fan-favorite (at this time, two finalists were eliminated each episode: one by the judges, one by fan-vote). At the taping, the audience loudly booed the decision to eliminate Rodgers, continuing after the show had gone off-air. For 2005, the elimination process was altered, completely removing the judges from the equation. The process was again altered in 2006, allowing judges to remove one finalist (two in 2007, back to one in 2008) on the premiere episode only before fans get the chance to vote.

In 2005, finalist Tamika Tyler blamed producers for attempting to influence fans to vote against her, after she was voted off on an early-season episode. Tyler claims that video clips of a confrontation between her and eventual winner Erika Jo concerning the difference in their ages were doctored and taken out of context as they were presented on the show. The show's producers would refute the claims; however, in 2006, the focus of the videos shifted from interactions between finalists to a behind-the-scenes look at each finalist preparing for his or her performance.

During the fifth episode of the 2007 season, no finalist was eliminated. However, host Jewel teased an elimination several times from the beginning of the episode, only to reveal at the very end that the previous week's show experienced "technical difficulties" and the voting results were discarded. Neither USA Network nor Reveille Productions, would comment publicly on the "technical difficulties". Had the show eliminated a finalist that week, the finale episode would have only featured two performers, instead of the usual three.

As stated below and on this page, the winner of season 6 was supposed to perform at the closing ceremony of the 2008 Summer Olympics in Beijing, China, which was also shown on NBC in the U.S. However, that performance did not occur; no reason was ever given for the cancellation.

== Hosts ==
The host for the first two seasons of Nashville Star was entertainment reporter Nancy O'Dell, who also served as a consulting producer. Before the third season (2005), USA Network announced the show would move from Saturday nights to a more desirable prime time slot on Tuesday nights. As a result of the move, O'Dell chose to leave the show due to her hosting commitments at Access Hollywood, which is taped in Los Angeles. Since then, the show has had a different host each year, consisting of hit-making country singers.

Nashville Star hosts
Season	Host	Notes
1 (2003)	Nancy O'Dell	
2 (2004)	Nancy O'Dell	
3 (2005)	LeAnn Rimes	Sara Evans substituted for Rimes during episodes 7 and 8 due to vocal cord injury; Cledus T. Judd was co-host, but was credited as "Special Correspondent".
4 (2006)	Wynonna	Cowboy Troy was co-host; Two Foot Fred hosted "Small Talk" segment.
5 (2007)	Jewel	Cowboy Troy was co-host; Two Foot Fred hosted "Small Talk" segment.
6 (2008)	Billy Ray Cyrus	Katie Cook was co-host, but credited as "Correspondent".

== Judges ==
The show has seen a revolving door of judges as well, with recording industry executive Anastasia Brown serving the longest (a three-season stint from 2005–2007). 2008 marked the first time a recording industry executive was not a member of the panel, and also the first time judges co-acted as mentors.

Nashville Star judges
Season	Judge 1	Judge 2	Judge 3
1 (2003)	Robert K. Oermann	Tracy Gershon	Charlie Robison
2 (2004)	Billy Greenwood	Tracy Gershon	The Warren Brothers
3 (2005)	Phil Vassar	Anastasia Brown	Bret Michaels
4 (2006)	Phil Vassar	Anastasia Brown	Weekly guest judge^{A}
5 (2007)	Randy Owen	Anastasia Brown	Blake Shelton
6 (2008)	Jeffrey Steele	John Rich	Jewel

^{A} Weekly guest judges during 2006 mostly included bona fide musicians, but also included comedian Larry the Cable Guy and wrestler John Cena who both appeared in character for promotional consideration.

== Winners ==
Nashville Star winners
Season	Winner	Second	Third	Fourth
1 (2003)	Buddy Jewell	John Arthur Martinez	Miranda Lambert	Brandi Gibson
2 (2004)	Brad Cotter	George Canyon	Matt Lindahl	Lance Miller
3 (2005)	Erika Jo	Jason Meadows	Jody Evans	Jayron Weaver
4 (2006)	Chris Young	Casey Rivers	Nicole Jamrose	Matt Mason
5 (2007)	Angela Hacker	Zac Hacker	David St. Romain	Joshua Stevens
6 (2008)	Melissa Lawson	Gabe Garcia	Shawn Mayer	Coffey Anderson

== Season 1 (2003) ==
Season 1 was broadcast on USA Network and presented by Nancy O'Dell. Judges were country music historian Robert K. Oermann, record label executive Tracy Gershon, and singer/songwriter Charlie Robison.

Nashville Star began its first season on March 8, 2003.

The standings for 2003 were:

Place	Name	Sex	Age	Hometown	Week eliminated
1	Buddy Jewell	M	41	Osceola, Arkansas	Winner
2	John Arthur Martinez	M	41	Marble Falls, Texas	Finale (May 3, 2003)
3	Miranda Lambert	F	19	Lindale, Texas	Finale (May 3, 2003)
4	Brandi Gibson	F	21	Arlington, Kentucky	Week 8 (April 26, 2003)
5	Brandon Silveira	M	24	Hanford, California	Week 7 (April 19, 2003)
6	Amy Chappell	F	27	Hutchinson, Kansas	Week 6 (April 12, 2003)
7	Jamey Garner	M	32	Chester, Illinois	Week 5 (April 5, 2003)
8	Prentiss Varnon	M	22	Uvalde, Texas	Week 4 (March 29, 2003) (judges' decision)
9	Travis Howard	M	32	Chalybeate Springs, Georgia	Week 4 (March 29, 2003)
10	Tasha Valentine	F	21	Albuquerque, New Mexico	Week 3 (March 22, 2003) (judges' decision)
11	Kristen Kissling	F	22	Topeka, Kansas	Week 3 (March 22, 2003)
12	Ann Louise Blythe	F	24	San Lorenzo, California	Week 2 (March 15, 2003) (judges' decision)

The first winner of Nashville Star, in the spring of 2003, was 41-year-old Buddy Jewell. On the strength of his win, Jewell's self-titled album released via Columbia Records earned him a gold record and two top-five country hits in "Help Pour Out the Rain (Lacey's Song)" and "Sweet Southern Comfort", both at No. 3. With the release of a second album, Times Like These, Jewell saw declining sales and was dropped from the label. That season's runner-up, John Arthur Martinez, has released several independently produced albums, and one under a major banner.

Miranda Lambert finished third. Her debut album, Kerosene, debuted on the Billboard country albums chart at No. 1 upon its 2005 release, and with a platinum certification from the RIAA, it is the best-selling album from a Nashville Star contestant. Her second album, Crazy Ex-Girlfriend, is certified platinum too and has produced three more Top 20 hits, one of which ("Gunpowder & Lead") reached No. 7 in 2008. Her third album, Revolution, which is also certified platinum, gave her her first No. 1 "The House That Built Me". At the 2010 Academy of Country Music Awards, Lambert won three awards, including Top Female Vocalist, Video of the Year for 'White Liar' and Album of the Year for 'Revolution'. She has also been named Female Vocalist of the Year at the Academy of Country Music Awards and Country Music Association Awards for seven consecutive years (2010 to 2016). She is widely considered to be the most successful contestant in the history of the show; although Season 4 winner Chris Young has more No. 1 country singles (nine) than Lambert (four), Lambert has more No. 1 country albums (six) than Young (two).

== Season 2 (2004) ==
Nancy O'Dell returned as host. Record label executive Tracy Gershon returned as a judge, joined by radio personality Billy Greenwood and country artists The Warren Brothers. The show was broadcast on USA Network.

The standings for 2004 were:

Place	Name	Sex	Age	Hometown	Week eliminated
1	Brad Cotter	M	33	Opelika, Alabama	Winner
2	George Canyon	M	33	New Glasgow, Nova Scotia, Canada	Finale (May 1, 2004)
3	Matt Lindahl	M	28	Snellville, Georgia	Finale (May 1, 2004)
4	Lance Miller	M	33	Fairfield, Illinois	Week 8 (April 24, 2004)
5	Jennifer Hicks	F	35	Nashville, Tennessee	Week 7 (April 17, 2004)
6	Brent Keith	M	24	Blanchester, Ohio	Week 6 (April 10, 2004)
7	Marty Slayton	F	37	Alamo, Tennessee	Week 5 (April 3, 2004)
8	Sheila Marshall	F	31	Nacogdoches, Texas	Week 5 (April 3, 2004)
9	Mal Rogers	M	24	Antrim, Northern Ireland	Week 3 (March 20, 2004) (judges' decision)
10	Stacy Michelle	F	33	Memphis, Tennessee	Week 3 (March 20, 2004)
11	Gregory DeLang	F	39	San Angelo, Texas	Week 2 (March 13, 2004) (judges' decision)

*No finalist was eliminated on the Week 4 show due to a "technical glitch" during Week 3's show.

Nashville Star began its second season on March 6, 2004. In 2004, the winner was 33-year-old Brad Cotter, who enjoyed very limited success after his win. Cotter was one of ten finalists eliminated by the judges on the first episode, but was allowed back into the competition after he was selected by viewers to be the one of those ten saved. The format was changed after the 2004 season and that element of the competition was scrapped.

Cotter won a recording contract with Sony Music on its Epic Records label. His first album, Patient Man, performed poorly, selling less than 140,000 copies. He was subsequently dropped from the roster. Cotter remains on tour opening for other country artists, such as Mark Chesnutt and Restless Heart.

However, runner-up George Canyon (also 33 years old) experienced a result similar to Miranda Lambert. He did not win a record deal from the show and has not achieved success in the U.S., but he has become a country music star in his native Canada, where he was signed by Universal Music and has released three successful albums.

Following the season, third-place finisher Matt Lindahl began appearing in television, radio, billboard, and print advertisements for Purity Dairies, a regional dairy company based in Nashville. In the television and radio ads, Lindahl (along with his band) sings, acts, and plays the washboard - an instrument that he also played on Nashville Star.

In 2007, Lance Miller signed with Warner Bros. Records and appeared on Star to perform his first single.

Sixth-place finisher Brent Keith was a top 36 semi-finalist on the eighth season of American Idol, but was not voted through to the finals.

== Season 3 (2005) ==
Nashville Star began its third season on March 1, 2005. The host was LeAnn Rimes and Cledus T. Judd was co-host, but credited as "Special Correspondent". Sara Evans substituted for Rimes during episodes 7 and 8 due to vocal cord injury. Judges were singer/songwriter Phil Vassar, record label executive Anastasia Brown, and singer/songwriter (and Poison frontman) Bret Michaels.

The standings for 2005 were:

Place	Name	Sex	Age	Hometown	Week eliminated
1	Erika Jo	F	18	Mt. Juliet, Tennessee	Winner
2	Jason Meadows	M	33	Calera, Oklahoma	Finale (April 26, 2005)
3	Jody Evans	M	28	Donaldson, Arkansas	Finale (April 26, 2005)
4	Jayron Weaver	M	22	Dallas, Georgia	Week 8 (April 19, 2005)
5	Justin David	M	31	Marshfield, Missouri	Week 7 (April 12, 2005)
6	Jenny Farrell	F	35	Albuquerque, New Mexico	Week 6 (April 5, 2005)
7	Tamika Tyler	F	33	Coffs Harbour, Australia	Week 5 (March 29, 2005)
8	Casey Simpson	F	19	Cerritos, California	Week 4 (March 22, 2005)
9	Christy McDonald	F	29	Tabor City, North Carolina	Week 3 (March 15, 2005)
10	Josh Owen	M	19	Brownsboro, Texas	Week 2 (March 8, 2005)

The 2005 winner was 18-year-old Erika Jo from Mount Juliet, Tennessee — the first female and youngest overall winner. Her victory was watched by the show's largest-ever USA Network audience, when over three million people tuned in to see the finale on April 26. It marked the first time the show ranked among the top ten cable shows of the week.

Erika Jo's self-titled album debuted at No. 5 on the country album charts, but quickly fell out of the top ten, selling just over 118,000 copies in the year following its release. The video for the first single, "I Break Things", initially received heavy rotation on CMT and GAC, but the song was largely ignored by country radio and only reached No. 53 on the Billboard Magazine country charts. One subsequent single (a cover of Jessi Colter's 1975 hit "I'm Not Lisa") was released, but it also failed to attract substantial attention. She was later dropped from the Universal South roster. Erika Jo occasionally appeared on the Grand Ole Opry shortly following her victory.

Second-place finisher Jason Meadows released an album 100% Cowboy via the independent Baccerstick label in 2008, and although the album charted, none of its three singles did. Fourth place Jayron Weaver went on to form with Delnora Reed a duo named Blue-Eyed Grass.

== Season 4 (2006) ==
Wynonna was the host of the series and Cowboy Troy was co-host. Two Foot Fred hosts "Small Talk" segment.

Phil Vassar and Anastasia Brown returned as regular judges, with a third seat occupied by guest judges, which included:

- Premiere (3/14/06) - Big & Rich
- Week 2 (3/21/06) - comedian Larry the Cable Guy
- Week 3 (3/28/06) - World Wrestling Entertainment star John Cena
- Week 4 (4/4/06) - Naomi Judd
- Week 5 (4/11/06) - David Foster
- Week 6 (4/18/06) - Patti LaBelle
- Week 7 (4/25/06) - Scott Weiland & Duff McKagan (of Velvet Revolver)
- Finale (5/2/06) - Big & Rich

The standings for 2006 were:

Place	Name	Sex	Age	Hometown	Week eliminated
1	Chris Young	M	20	Murfreesboro, Tennessee	Winner
2	Casey Rivers	M	23	Lindale, Texas	Finale (May 2, 2006)
3	Nicole Jamrose	F	33	Schererville, Indiana	Finale (May 2, 2006)
4	Matt Mason	M	20	Fairland, Indiana	Week 7 (April 25, 2006)
5	Jared Ashley	M	29	Hobbs, New Mexico	Week 6 (April 18, 2006)
6	Kristen McNamara	F	20	Napa Valley, California	Week 5 (April 11, 2006)
7	Melanie Torres	F	28	Albuquerque, New Mexico	Week 4 (April 4, 2006)
8	Monique LeCompte	F	23	Grand Terrace, California	Week 3 (March 28, 2006)
9	Shy Blakeman	M	25	Kilgore, Texas	Week 2 (March 21, 2006)
10	Jewels Hanson	F	31	Fremont, California	Premiere (March 14, 2006) (judges' decision)

The 2006 winner was 20-year-old Chris Young. Nashville Star began its fourth season on March 14, 2006, with a slightly altered set, two new hosts in Wynonna & Cowboy Troy, and only two regular judges. A guest judge occupied the third seat each week. The format remained unaltered, though the length of the season was reduced by one week, and one finalist was eliminated on the season premiere (by judges' decision) to compensate. Two Foot Fred's "Small Talk" segment also made its debut in 2006. The season ended on May 2, 2006, with Young—from nearby Murfreesboro, Tennessee—crowned champion. His self-titled debut album was released on October 3, 2006, and debuted at No. 3 on the Billboard country chart, although its singles both missed Top 40. Young charted in the Top 40 for the first time in 2008 with "Voices", and reached number one in 2009 with "Gettin' You Home (The Black Dress Song)" and "The Man I Want to Be". "Voices" was then re-released in 2010 and also went on to reach number one. Young also received a Grammy nomination in 2016 for "Think of You" with The Voice contestant Cassadee Pope. Sixth-place finisher Kristen McNamara was a top 36 finalist on the eighth season of American Idol, but was not voted into the Top 13. Fourth-place finisher Matt Mason would go on to win the first season of CMT's Next Superstar.

== Season 5 (2007) ==
Jewel hosted the show and Cowboy Troy returned as co-host. Two Foot Fred returned as host of the "Small Talk" segment. Judges included Anastasia Brown, who returned for her third season at the desk. Joining her were country singers Randy Owen (lead singer of Alabama) and Blake Shelton.

The standings for 2007 were:

Place	Name	Sex	Age	Hometown	Week eliminated
1	Angela Hacker	F	28	Muscle Shoals, Alabama	Winner
2	Zac Hacker	M	23	Muscle Shoals, Alabama	Finale (March 1, 2007)
3	David St. Romain	M	28	Baton Rouge, Louisiana	Finale (March 1, 2007)
4	Joshua Stevens	M	28	Churchville, Iowa	Week 7 (February 22, 2007)
5	Whitney Duncan	F	22	Scotts Hill, Tennessee	Week 6 (February 15, 2007)
6	Meg Allison	F	25	Chicago, Illinois	Week 4 (February 1, 2007)
7	Kacey Musgraves	F	18	Golden, Texas	Week 3 (January 25, 2007)
8	Dustin Wilkes	M	26	Jefferson, Georgia	Week 2 (January 18, 2007)
9 (t)	Rickiejoleen	F	18	Tempe, Arizona	Premiere (January 11, 2007) (judges' decision)
9 (t)	Tim LaRoche	M	36	Gardner-Athol, Massachusetts	Premiere (January 11, 2007) (judges' decision)

*No finalist was eliminated on the Week 5 show due to "technical difficulties" during Week 4's show.

The above ten were chosen from over fifty Regional Finalists, selected from local area callbacks and auditions. The Regional Finals were held in Nashville, TN, on November 1–3, 2006, at The Stage.

The 2007 winner of Nashville Star was 29-year-old Angela Hacker from Muscle Shoals, Alabama, who finished just ahead of her younger brother, Zac. It was the first time that siblings had competed, let alone finished in the top two.

The fifth season debuted on USA Network and CMT Canada at 10 pm EST on January 11, 2007. There were several changes to the show, including an earlier start date and a new night. The series moved to January and February, and aired live on Thursdays at 10 pm EST rather than Tuesdays. Jewel replaced Wynonna as host, with Cowboy Troy returning as co-host. The format remained mostly unaltered, except the judges eliminated two finalists (one male, one female) on the premiere episode. Sonic Drive-In was the presenting sponsor for 2007. The season finale aired on March 1, 2007.

Following the season, Angela Hacker's album The Winner Is Angela Hacker was released on Warner Bros. Records. The album, composed of cover song demos she recorded while on the show, was only available at Walmart. She also appeared on Cowboy Troy's Black in the Saddle album, singing guest vocals on "Hick Chick". She left Warner in August 2008 without releasing any singles.

Fifth-placer Whitney Duncan, who had previously charted the duet "My World Is Over" with Kenny Rogers in 2004, signed to Warner as well, charting with "When I Said I Would". Her debut album, Right Road Now, was first slated for release in mid-2008, but was delayed repeatedly due to poor performance of its singles. It was eventually released in early 2010, and Duncan soon after parted ways with the record label. Duncan would later compete in the CBS reality series Survivor: South Pacific and finished in 9th place. She would later participate in another CBS reality series The Amazing Race 25, with her fellow Survivor contestant and fiancé Keith Tollefson; they finished in 8th place.

Kacey Musgraves, who finished in seventh place, signed with Mercury Records in 2012 and released her debut single, "Merry Go 'Round", which was a top 20 country hit. Her major-label debut, Same Trailer Different Park, was released on March 19, 2013. It reached number 1 on the country albums chart and number 2 on the Billboard 200, and won the Academy of Country Music award for Album of the Year, and also the Grammy Award for Best Country Album. Her second major-label release, Pageant Material (2015), was nominated for Best Country Album at the 58th Grammy Awards. Her first Christmas-themed album, A Very Kacey Christmas, was released on October 28, 2016. Her fourth studio album, Golden Hour (2018), won four Grammy Awards, including Album of the Year and Best Country Album.

== Season 6 (2008) ==
In Season 6, the show moved from USA Network to NBC. The move to NBC (and E! in Canada) came with a few format changes to the show, including the first time that auditions were shown on-air. Also, the on-screen judges presided over the initial auditions for the first time. The minimum age was lowered to 16 (from 18), and duos and trios were allowed to compete. The field was expanded to twelve finalists (groups counted as one finalist), the largest field since Season 1. The show also received a new set, opening, and theme song. Beginning with the second episode, the show was broadcast in HDTV for the first time; the premiere retained the NTSC format.

Season 6 of Nashville Star premiered on NBC on June 9, 2008, at 9PM Eastern/Pacific. Its heavily-promoted first broadcast, a two-hour premiere, earned a 2.2 rating, its first hour finishing fourth and its second hour finishing second among the four major networks. Despite the relatively low ratings for a network show, the premiere attracted the most viewers for a single episode in the show's history, outdrawing all episodes broadcast on USA Network. The second episode lost 18 percent of its debut audience. The show during season 6 placed fourth in the first hour and placed second overall in the second hour of the broadcast. Billy Ray Cyrus hosted the sixth season. The winner of the first-ever NBC season was 32-year-old Melissa Lawson.

The finalists for 2008 were:

Place	Name	Sex	Age	Hometown	Week eliminated
1	Melissa Lawson	F	32	Arlington, Texas	Winner
2	Gabe Garcia	M	28	Lytle, Texas	Finale (August 4, 2008)
3	Shawn Mayer	F	21	May City, Iowa	Finale (August 4, 2008)
4	Coffey Anderson	M	28	Bangs, Texas	Week 8 (July 28, 2008)
5	Ashlee Hewitt	F	20	Lancaster, Minnesota	Week 7 (July 21, 2008)
6	Laura F. and Sophie Z.	F	18 & 16	Willoughby, Ohio	Week 6 (July 14, 2008)
7	Pearl Heart (Amy, Angela & Courtney Krechel)	F	20 & 17	Florissant, Missouri	Week 5 (July 7, 2008)
8	Tommy Stanley	M	23	Cushing, Oklahoma	Week 5 (July 7, 2008)
9	Alyson Gilbert	F	28	Crookston, Minnesota	Week 4 (June 30, 2008)
10	Justin Gaston	M	19	Pineville, Louisiana	Week 3 (June 23, 2008)
11	Third Town (Jeffrey F, James K. & Tony M.)	M	37, 29 & 35	Las Vegas, Nevada (via San Antonio, Texas)	Week 2 (June 16, 2008)
12	Charley Jenkins	M	29	Roosevelt, Utah	Premiere (June 9, 2008) (judges' decision)

The sixth season featured judges Jeffrey Steele, John Rich, and Jewel (who hosted Season Five). For the first time, the judges also acted as mentors to the finalists, and Rich produced songs later included in the EP, United We Stand. The winner was promised a recording contract with Warner Bros. Records, a Toyota Tundra pickup truck, and the opportunity to perform at the 2008 Summer Olympics in Beijing.

The sixth season also brought Nashville Star to the American CMT network for the first time. The cable network rebroadcast each episode the following Friday. Beginning with the show's second episode, CMT's Katie Cook joined the show as a correspondent.

For the first time in the show's history, a companion radio show was developed to complement the television program. Nashville Star Radio debuted each Thursday evening on XM's "Highway 16". NSR featured the week's performances from the television show, as well as exclusive in-studio performances and interviews with the finalists and judges.

AT&T became a major sponsor of the show, placing their logo on screen with each finalist's call-in vote line. AT&T sponsored the same service on American Idol. Also, Toyota replaced Chevrolet as a sponsor, and offered its signature Tundra pickup as a prize to the winner.

Guest Performers for the 2008 season included Taylor Swift, Trace Adkins, Danity Kane, and Blake Shelton.

Thirty-two-year-old Melissa Lawson won. Lawson had made it to the Top 75 on season 4 of American Idol. She released a single "What If It All Goes Right" that charted at No. 43 on the US Country charts and No. 79 on the general US chart. Second-placed Gabe Garcia, went on to form the Gabe Garcia Band.

Coffey Anderson (also written Cofféy Anderson), a Los Angeles, California, resident but originally from Bangs, Texas, finished 4th. He had briefly been a contestant on season 2 of American Idol in 2003, making it to the Hollywood round. Coffey Anderson has released four albums: Southern Man, Me and You and the spiritual Christian albums Inspiration Vol. 1 and Worship Unplugged 1. He enjoys huge popularity online, particularly with his compositions "Memphis", "Southern Man", "Rock 'n Roll Sally", "All Ye", "Let me Love You" and "Can I". He also has his own indie label Coffey Entertainment, LLC.

Third-placer Shawn Mayer is currently releasing songs digitally, and fifth-placer Ashlee Hewitt is currently songwriting and working with close friend and fellow country singer Katie Armiger.

With the release of "Teddy Gentry's Best New Nashville" through the Cracker Barrel music program in all 601 Cracker Barrel locations in 42 states, sixth-placer Laura Fedor becomes the first-ever non-major-label-signed artist to be allowed in their music program, and the only artist besides the winner to have a prominent national release on a respected label.
