= Erika Jo (album) =

Studio album by Erika Jo
- Released: June 14, 2005
- Studio: Starstruck Studios; Big One Three Productions; 1808 Studios; (Nashville, TN)
- Genre: Country
- Length: 38:44
- Label: Universal South
- Producer: Tony Brown; Tim DuBois; Rick Giles; Steve Mandile

Singles from Erika Jo
- 1. "I Break Things" Released: April 26, 2005; 2. "I'm Not Lisa" Released: September 19, 2005

Professional ratings
Review scores
Source	Rating
Allmusic	3.5/5 stars

Erika Jo is the debut studio album by American country music artist Erika Jo. It was released on June 14, 2005 by Universal South Records, following her win on the third season of Nashville Star in 2005 of which she was the show's first female winner (following Buddy Jewell and Brad Cotter) and the youngest to ever compete on it at just eighteen. Tim DuBois produced the album with Rick Giles and Sixwire member Steve Mandile on all tracks except "I Break Things", which he co-produced with Tony Brown.

The album debuted at number 5 on the Billboard Top Country Albums chart.

== Chart performance ==
=== Singles ===
"I Break Things" was released to country radio immediately after her winning. The track debuted and peaked at number 53 on the US Billboard Hot Country Songs on May 14, 2005; it however only spent one week in total on the chart. On Radio & Records, the track debuted and peaked at number 49 on the Country Top 50 and number 40 on the Country Indicator chart. The second and final single, a cover of Jessi Colter's "I'm Not Lisa", was released on September 19, 2005. Universal South Records promo chief Michael Powers called it a "sparsely arranged and powerful remake of the Jessi Colter classic." It failed to enter any charts.

=== Album ===
Erika Jo debuted at number five on the US Top Country Albums chart on July 2, 2005, with 36,000 units sold first week; it marked the third album by a debut artist to enter the top ten that year. Despite that, the album spent only 16 weeks on the chart. By 2007, the album had just sold 122,000 units, long after Erika Jo had left Universal South.

== Track listing ==
All tracks produced by Tim DuBois, Rick Giles, and Steve Mandile except where noted.

Erika Jo track listing
No.	Title	Writer(s)	Producer(s)	Length
1.	"I Break Things"	Monty Criswell; Wade Kirby	Tim DuBois; Tony Brown	3:04
2.	"Who You Are"	Aimee Mayo; Marv Green		3:25
3.	"There Are No Accidents"	Tom Shapiro; Mark Nesler; Tony Martin		3:40
4.	"Go"	Jim Collins; Shaye Smith		3:35
5.	"Strong Tonight"	Sunny Russ		3:40
6.	"Good Day for Goodbye"	Chris Farren; Blair Daly; Katrina Elam		3:29
7.	"Wish You Back to Me"	Janet Turner; Steve Mandile; Chad Turner		4:16
8.	"They Say Love Is Blind"	Shane Teeters; Kerry Kurt Phillips; Rachel Proctor		3:22
9.	"Going 'Til You're Gone"	Dave Berg; Marty Dodson		3:35
10.	"Love Is"	Katrina Elam; Bonnie Baker		3:15
11.	"I'm Not Lisa"	Jessi Colter		3:23
Total length:				38:44

== Musicians ==
Compiled from liner notes.

- Eddie Bayers — drums
- Thom Flora — background vocals
- Paul Franklin — pedal steel guitar, lap steel guitar, Dobro
- Steve Gibson — acoustic guitar
- Aubrey Haynie — fiddle, mandolin
- Wes Hightower — background vocals
- John Barlow Jarvis — piano
- Steve Mandile — acoustic guitar, electric guitar
- Brent Mason — electric guitar
- Steve Nathan — keyboards, Hammond B-3 organ
- Larry Paxton — bass guitar
- Jimmie Lee Sloas — bass guitar
- Harry Stinson — background vocals
- Russell Terrell — background vocals
- Chuck Tilley — percussion

== Charts ==
Chart (2005)	Peak position
US Top Country Albums (Billboard)	5
US Billboard 200	27
