= John Martinez =

John Martinez may refer to:

- John Arthur Martinez (born 1961), American country music singer-songwriter
- Buck Martinez (John Albert Martinez, born 1948), former Major League Baseball catcher and manager
