= Sixwire (album) =

Studio album by Sixwire
- Released: July 30, 2002
- Genre: Country
- Length: 40:39
- Label: Warner Bros.
- Producer: Steve Mandile

Sixwire is the self-titled debut studio album by American country music band Sixwire. It was released on June 30, 2002, on Warner Bros. Records Nashville. Lead guitarist Steve Mandile produced the album. The album produced two singles for the band that reached the Billboard Hot Country Singles & Tracks chart in "Look at Me Now" and "Way Too Deep", which peaked at numbers 30 and 55, respectively. The album peaked at number 38 on the Top Country Albums chart and number 32 on Top Heatseekers chart.

== Critical reception ==
Robert L. Doerschuk of AllMusic wrote that the band's "collective sound is seamless, spirited, and predictable[…]and their songs reflect all the attributes of commercial country." Country Standard Time reviewer Brian Baker was more positive, saying that he did not consider the band's sound country in nature but adding, "Sixwire makes great pop music that occasionally offers up the sonic touchstones of country[…]and they sell it all with truly impressive vocal harmonies."

== Track listing ==
No.	Title	Writer(s)	Length
1.	"Way Too Deep"	Andy Childs, Steve Mandile	3:30
2.	"I Hope She Comes Around"	Mandile	2:35
3.	"Look at Me Now"	Mandile, Steve McClintock	3:26
4.	"Saving Grace"	Childs, Mandile	3;26
5.	"Say It Simple"	John Bettis, Childs, Mandile	3:36
6.	"Please Believe"	Julie Corlew Adkison, Mandile	3:42
7.	"Jack"	Childs, Mandile	4:13
8.	"I Can't Help How I Feel"	Mandile	4:12
9.	"Broken"	Mandile, Jeremy Stover	3:39
10.	"I Heard That"	Childs, Mandile	3:27
11.	"Brave Soul"	Childs, Mandile, Robb Houston, John Howard, Chuck Tilley	4:45

== Personnel ==
As listed on CD backing card.

=== Sixwire ===
- Andy Childs – lead vocals, piano
- Robb Houston – rhythm guitar, background vocals
- John Howard – bass guitar
- Steve Mandile – lead guitar, acoustic guitar, background vocals
- Chuck Tilley – drums, percussion, timpani

=== Additional musicians ===
- Russ Pahl – steel guitar, banjo
- Dennis Wage – piano, Hammond organ, keyboards
- Jonathan Yudkin – fiddle, violin, viola, cello, harp, bells, mandolin, string arrangements

== Charts ==
Chart (2002)	Peak position
U.S. Billboard Top Country Albums	38
U.S. Billboard Top Heatseekers	32
