= John Bohlinger (musician) =

John Bohlinger Jr

Background information
- Born: Billings, Montana, United States
- Instruments: Guitar, Pedal Steel, Mandolin, Dobro, Bass, Harmonica

John C. Bohlinger III is an American musician, and writer who worked primarily in television as a band leader/music director for The USA Network's Real Country, NBC's program Nashville Star The Next GAC Star for Great American Country, the "CMT Music Awards" from 2009 to 2024, CMT's Campfire Sessions 12/6/2023 and The CMT's Christmas Special featuring Larry The Cable Guy as well as PBS's The Outlaw Trail, GAC networks' 2012 Christmas with Scotty McCreery & Friends. In 2013, Bohlinger became the Nashville video correspondent for Premier Guitar where he films Review Demos of musical gear and Rig Rundown interviews with celebrity guitarists.

In addition to his work in music, Bohlinger is a contributor and co-editor of A Guitar and a Pen, Stories by Country Music's Greatest Songwriters, published by Center Street, a division of Hachette book group. Bohlinger now writes a monthly column entitled "Last Call" for Premier Guitar.

== Early life and education ==
John Bohlinger is the son of Montana lieutenant governor John Bohlinger and Bette Cobetto Bohlinger. During high school his parents withdrew him from public school and sent him to the Hun School of Princeton, where he graduated. Bohlinger began his undergraduate studies at the University of Montana, quit school after two years to work at a school and orphanage in Honduras, then returned to finish his bachelor's studies at Columbia University, where he graduated magna cum laude in English literature and was elected to Phi Beta Kappa.

== Career ==
Bohlinger writes a monthly column entitled "Last Call", for Premier Guitar. The column is a somewhat comedic, instructional guide to earning a living as a musician in the music business. He also writes other columns for the magazine, usually involving gear or guides for specific playing styles.

In addition to his column, Bohlinger also performs "Rig Rundown" interviews for Premier Guitar, interviewing touring musicians about their guitars, effects chain and other gear. He also demo's and reviews a wide variety of gear for Premier Guitar's video reviews.

== Personal life ==
On July 10, 2022, Bohlinger married Amy Kirk, a painter, visual artist, and former model. They have one daughter and live in Nashville, Tennessee.

== Filmography ==
- Little Giants (1994) - songwriter, "She Ain't My Baby Anymore"
- Joy Ride (2001) - performer/songwriter: "If You're Gonna Leave Me, Can I Come Too"
- Nashville Star (2003–2008), Band Leader/ Music Director/Composer
- Next GAC Star (2008) Band Leader/ Music Director/Composer
- The Outlaw Trail (2008) Featured Performer/ Songwriter
- "CMT Music Awards" 2009, 2010, 2011, 2012, 2013, 2014, 2015, 2016,2017, 2018, 2019, 2020,2021, 2022 - Music Director/Band Leader/Composer
- "Country Strong" (2010) - bass player, Gwyneth Paltrow's band.
- "The Gundown" (2011) film starring Peter Coyote, William Shokley. Music Composed by John Bohlinger.
- The Songs of Johnny Cash (2012). Ovation TV. The documentary series features rare interviews about the legend with such great talents as Kris Kristofferson, Merle Haggard, Shelby Lynne, Marty Stuart, Rodney Crowell, George Jones, Grace Potter, Shooter Jennings, David Wild, Billy Bob Thornton, Chris Isaak, Ben Folds, John Carter Cash, Peter Cooper, Josh Thompson, Ken Paulson, Peter Collins, Yelawolf and Justin Townes Earle. The series, narrated by musician John Bohlinger, highlights Cash's multi-generational impact on America music and culture.
- "Christmas with Scotty McCreery & Friends Band Leader/ Music Director/Composer "2012, GAC networks'
- "Thrift Store Cowboy" (2013). songwriter/performer, "Just Someone You use to Know"
- Nashville (2014). ABC Network. John plays the guitarist in character Luke Wheeler's band.
- 2016 CMT Artist of the Year Award Music Director/ arranger/ performer (pedal steel) for the Shania Twain tribute featuring Jill Scott, Meghan Trainor, Kelsea Ballerini.
- USA Network's Real Country (2018) Band Leader/ Music Director/

Bohlinger has also performed multiple times on The Tonight Show with Jay Leno, Late Night with David Letterman, The ACM Awards, The CMA Awards, Nashville Now, Good Morning America, Fox and Friends, and several other programs featuring live music.

== Published works ==
- A Guitar and a Pen co-edited with Robert Hicks and Justin Stelter (Center Street, 2008)
- "Last Call" monthly column for "Premier Guitar"

=== Songs ===
- "I Don't Smoke", written by John Bohlinger, Lee Brice, Jon Stone, Billy Montana. Performed by Lee Brice on Curb Records
- "Straw into Gold", written by John Bohlinger and Paul Allen. Performed by Ann Wilson and Nancy Wilson of Heart on Sony Legacy
- "This aint Your first Rodeo", written by John Bohlinger and Paul Allen. Performed by Chrissie Hynde on Sony Legacy
- "Buy Our CD", written by John Bohlinger, R.l. Feek, David Banning, performed by Joey + Rory bonus track for Album Number Two on Vanguard/Sugar Hill
- "Gone Either Way", written by John Bohlinger, Ray Scott, Philip Moore, performed by Ray Scott Warner Bro.
- "Next Time I Fall in Love", written by John Bohlinger, Trent Summar, Kostas, performed by Ashley Ray Universal Music Nashville
- "Honey Do", written by John Bohlinger, Wylie Gustafson, performed by Wylie and the Wild West Show
- "She Ain't My Baby", written by John Bohlinger, Kostas, Greg Lucas, performed by Kostas on Capitol Records Nashville
- "Just Like the Moon", written by John Bohlinger, John Arthur Martinez, performed by John Arthur Martinez on Dual Tone
- "Girl from Tennessee", written by John Bohlinger, Trent Summar, performed by Trent Summar
- "Too Busy Being Blue", written by John Bohlinger, Kostas, performed by Trent Summar
- "The Outlaw Trail", written by John Bohlinger, Rick Sanjek, performed by Suzy Bogguss and Lee Roy Parnell
- "Here Lies an Outlaw", written by John Bohlinger, Charles McCutcheon, performed by Del Castillo
- "The Ballad of Cherokee Bill", written by John Bohlinger and Cowboy Troy, performed by Cowboy Troy
- "Down Low", written by John Bohlinger and Paul Allen, performed by Ivan Neville on Sony Legacy
- "Look what love has Done" written by John Bohlinger, Jon Pousette-Dart, performed by Jon Pousette-Dart
- "The Delta is a Mystery" written and performed by John Bohlinger, Forrest Lee, performed by The Bendegos
- "On My Way", written and performed by John Bohlinger. ESPN: "The Color Orange". Produced by Kenny Chesney and Shaun Silva.
- "One of Us is Lying" written by John Bohlinger, performed by The Western Swing Authority. All Dolled Up
