= Jason Meadows =

American singer-songwriter

- Born: June 9, 1971 (age 55)
- Origin: Calera, Oklahoma, U.S.
- Genres: Country
- Occupation: Singer
- Instrument: Vocals
- Years active: 2007
- Label: Baccerstick

Jason Meadows (born June 9, 1971) is a country music artist. He was raised in Calera, Oklahoma. Meadows was a second-place finalist on the third season of the USA Networks talent show Nashville Star. Three singles were released from his debut album 100% Cowboy (the title track, "18 Video Tapes" and "Where Did My Dirt Road Go"), but all failed to chart. The album reached No. 59 on Top Country Albums. "18 Video Tapes" received a "thumbs up" rating from Engine 145, a country music review site. Reviewer Matt C. said, "Here’s a Nashville Star alumnus who didn’t score a major-label deal but nonetheless is producing interesting and compelling music."

== Discography ==
=== Studio albums ===
Title	Album details	Peak chart positions	
Title	Album details	US Country	US Heat
100% Cowboy	Release date: June 26, 2007; Label: Baccerstick Records	59	35

=== Singles ===
Title	Year	Album
2007	"100% Cowboy"	100% Cowboy
2007	"18 Video Tapes"	100% Cowboy
2009	"Where Did My Dirt Road Go"	100% Cowboy
2010	"You Ain't Never Been to Texas"	You Ain't Never Been to Texas EP
2011	"Go Back There Again"	You Ain't Never Been to Texas EP

=== Music videos ===
Year	Video	Director
2007	"100% Cowboy"	Jim Shea
2007	"18 Video Tapes"	Jeanine Pellegrino
2010	"You Ain't Never Been to Texas"	
