= Patient Man =

Studio album by Brad Cotter
- Released: July 6, 2004
- Genre: Country
- Length: 38:20
- Label: Epic
- Producer: Steve Bogard, Rick Giles

Brad Cotter chronology
Patient Man (2004)	Continuity (2007)

Professional ratings
Review scores
Source	Rating
AllMusic	3/5 stars

Patient Man is the debut studio album by American country music artist Brad Cotter, who in 2004 was declared the winner of the television talent show Nashville Star. It features the single "I Meant To", a top 40 hit on the Billboard Hot Country Singles & Tracks chart in 2004. "Can't Tell Me Nothin'" and "I Miss Me" were both released as singles as well, each peaking at No. 59 on the same chart.

== Track listing ==
Patient Man track listing
No.	Title	Writer(s)	Length
1.	"I Meant To"	Brad Cotter, Steve Bogard, Rick Giles	3:19
2.	"Can't Tell Me Nothin'"	Bogard, Giles	3:11
3.	"Patient Man"	Bogard, Giles	3:50
4.	"I Miss Me"	Cotter, Bogard, Giles	3:25
5.	"High on Love"	Cotter, Bogard, Giles	3:43
6.	"Rock and Roll in the Hay"	Tim Nichols, Jeff Stevens	3:51
7.	"Hard to Be a Rock"	Cotter, Bogard, Giles	3:30
8.	"I Came Here to Live"	Tony Lane	4:26
9.	"Blue Collar Night"	Jeffrey Steele, Bart Allmand	4:14
10.	"I've Got Time"	Cotter, Bogard, Giles	4:51

== Personnel ==
- Mike Brignardello - bass guitar
- Tom Bukovac - electric guitar
- J. T. Corenflos - electric guitar
- Eric Darken - percussion
- Larry Franklin - fiddle, mandolin
- Paul Franklin - steel guitar
- Tony Harrell - piano, B-3 organ, synthesizer
- Carl Marsh - keyboard
- Greg Morrow - drums, tambourine, shakers, maracas
- Steve Nathan - piano, B-3 organ, synthesizer
- Russ Pahl - steel guitar
- Brent Rowan - electric guitar
- Bryan Sutton - acoustic guitar
- Russell Terrell - background vocals
- Biff Watson - acoustic guitar

== Charts ==
=== Weekly charts ===
Chart (2004)	Peak position
US Billboard 200	27
US Top Country Albums (Billboard)	4

=== Year-end charts ===
Chart (2004)	Position
US Top Country Albums (Billboard)	74
