= Melissa Lawson =

American country music singer (born 1976)

Background information
- Born: Melissa Ann Lawson; April 10, 1976 (age 49)
- Origin: Arlington, Texas, United States
- Genres: Country, CCM
- Occupation: Singer
- Years active: 2008–present

Melissa Ann Lawson (born April 10, 1976) is an American country music singer. On August 4, 2008, she was declared the winner of the television program Nashville Star, a country music singing competition which aired on NBC. Signed to Warner Bros. Records Nashville, she released her debut single "What If It All Goes Right" that year, and charted on Hot Country Songs with it.

== Biography ==
Born in Dallas, Texas, Melissa Lawson grew up in Arlington, Texas. In 2004, she tried out for the fourth season of American Idol, and made it to the final day of Hollywood week, eventually being cut in the top 75. After this, she competed on and won the sixth and final season of Nashville Star in 2008.

== Music career ==
=== 2008-present: "What If It All Goes Right" and label release ===
Following her win on Nashville Star, Lawsons' debut single, "What If It All Goes Right", was released on August 5, 2008 to radio. It debuted and peaked at No. 49 on the U.S. Billboard Hot Country Songs chart as well as No. 79 on the Billboard Hot 100, due to legal music downloads. It was then re-released in November 2008, where it re-entered the country charts at No. 55, and eventually reached No. 43.

== Nashville Star ==
Melissa Lawson was the oldest contestant among the ten finalists.

=== Songs performed on Nashville Star ===
- "Something to Talk About" by Bonnie Raitt
- "(You Make Me Feel Like) A Natural Woman" by Aretha Franklin (Bottom Two)
- "True Colors" by Cyndi Lauper
- "Landslide" by Fleetwood Mac (Highest Number of Votes)
- "This One's for the Girls" by Martina McBride (Bottom Two)
- "Danny's Song" by Loggins and Messina
- "My Baby Loves Me" by Martina McBride
- "Ready to Stand" by Melissa Lawson & Margi Howard
- "Hit Me with Your Best Shot" by Pat Benatar
- "Jesus, Take the Wheel" by Carrie Underwood
- "Something More" by Sugarland
- "My Wish" by Rascal Flatts
- "What If It All Goes Right"

== Discography ==
=== Extended plays ===
Title	Album details
Constant	Release date: April 19, 2010; Label: self-released
United We Stand	Release date: August 3, 2010; Label: Bismeaux Records

=== Singles ===
Year	Single	Peak chart positions		Album
Year	Single	US Country	US	Album
2008	"What If It All Goes Right"	43	79	Non-album song
