= Sweet Southern Comfort =

Single by Buddy Jewell

from the album Buddy Jewell
- Released: October 27, 2003
- Genre: Country
- Length: 3:32
- Label: Columbia Nashville
- Songwriters: Rodney Clawson; Brad Crisler
- Producer: Clint Black

Buddy Jewell singles chronology
"Help Pour Out the Rain (Lacey's Song)" (2003)	"Sweet Southern Comfort" (2003)	"One Step at a Time" (2004)

"Sweet Southern Comfort" is a song written by Rodney Clawson and Brad Crisler, and recorded by American country music artist Buddy Jewell. It was released in October 2003 as the second single from his album Buddy Jewell. It peaked at No. 3 on the United States Hot Country Singles & Tracks in 2004, as did his previous single "Help Pour Out the Rain (Lacey's Song)" in 2003. It also peaked at No. 40 on the U.S. Billboard Hot 100.

== Content ==
The song tells of a small town man comparing small towns in the Southern U.S. to his hometown. Although his town is never mentioned it is implied that it is also in the Southern U.S. It mentions many Southern U.S. states such as "Carolina", Mississippi, Louisiana, Alabama, Arkansas, Georgia, and Texas.

== Music video ==
The music video was directed by Eric Welch. It was released November 8, 2003. Filmed entirely in sepia tone, it begins and ends with Jewell on the phone with presumably his wife, telling her that he misses her while on the road and can't wait to come home. As the song plays, Jewell is seen performing outside a barn, while various depictions of a simpler time in the Southern US are shown. It was filmed in San Antonio, TX (which is one of the places mentioned in the song).

== Chart positions ==
"Sweet Southern Comfort" debuted at number 47 on the U.S. Billboard Hot Country Singles & Tracks for the week of November 1, 2003.

Chart (2003–2004)	Peak position
Canada Country (Radio & Records)	4
US Hot Country Songs (Billboard)	3
US Billboard Hot 100	40

=== Year-end charts ===
Chart (2004)	Position
US Country Songs (Billboard)	12

== Arkansas version ==
Jewell released a remix version with changed lyrics in the third chorus adding “Woo Pig Sooie sure gets to me. Go Hogs Go!” in reference to the Arkansas Razorbacks. The lyrics replaced “Sleepy sweet home Alabama, Roll Tide Roll” which still remains in the first chorus of the released “Arkansas Version”.

== 20th anniversary version ==
In 2023, Jewell released a remix version which featured guest vocals from Clint Black, The Bellamy Brothers, and Marty Raybon for the song's 20th anniversary.
