= Andy Childs =

American country music singer-songwriter

- Born: December 7, 1962 (age 63); Memphis, Tennessee, United States
- Genres: Country
- Occupation: Singer
- Instruments: Vocals, guitar, piano
- Years active: 1993-present
- Label: RCA
- Member of: Sixwire

Andy Childs (born December 7, 1962) is an American country music singer-songwriter. In 1993, Childs released one studio album for RCA, which produced three singles on the Billboard Hot Country Singles & Tracks chart. His highest charting single, "Simple Life," peaked at No. 61 in 1994. The album received a favorable review from the Montgomery Advertiser, which praised Childs' singing voice and the album's production.

Childs has been a member of the country quintet Sixwire since its foundation in 2002. Sixwire recorded one studio album for Warner Bros. Records and charted two more singles on the country charts. Sixwire was featured as a finalist on American Idol's The Next Great American Band which aired on FOX in 2007. The band placed second out of the twelve finalists. Sixwire now serves as house band on CMT's Next Superstar.

As a songwriter, Childs penned more than half of the songs on Sixwire's Warner Brothers album, and has had songs recorded by Country artists Chris Cagle, George Canyon and others.

== Discography ==
=== Albums ===
Title	Album details
Andy Childs	Release date: August 10, 1993; Label: RCA Records

=== Singles ===
Year	Single	Peak positions	Album
Year	Single	US Country	Album
1993	"I Wouldn't Know"	73	Andy Childs
1993	"Broken"	62	Andy Childs
1994	"Simple Life"	61	Andy Childs

=== Music videos ===
Year	Video	Director
1993	"I Wouldn't Know"	Roger Pistole
1993	"Broken"	Steven Goldmann
1994	"Simple Life"	Brent Hedgecock
