= Calera, Oklahoma =

Town in Oklahoma, US

- Town
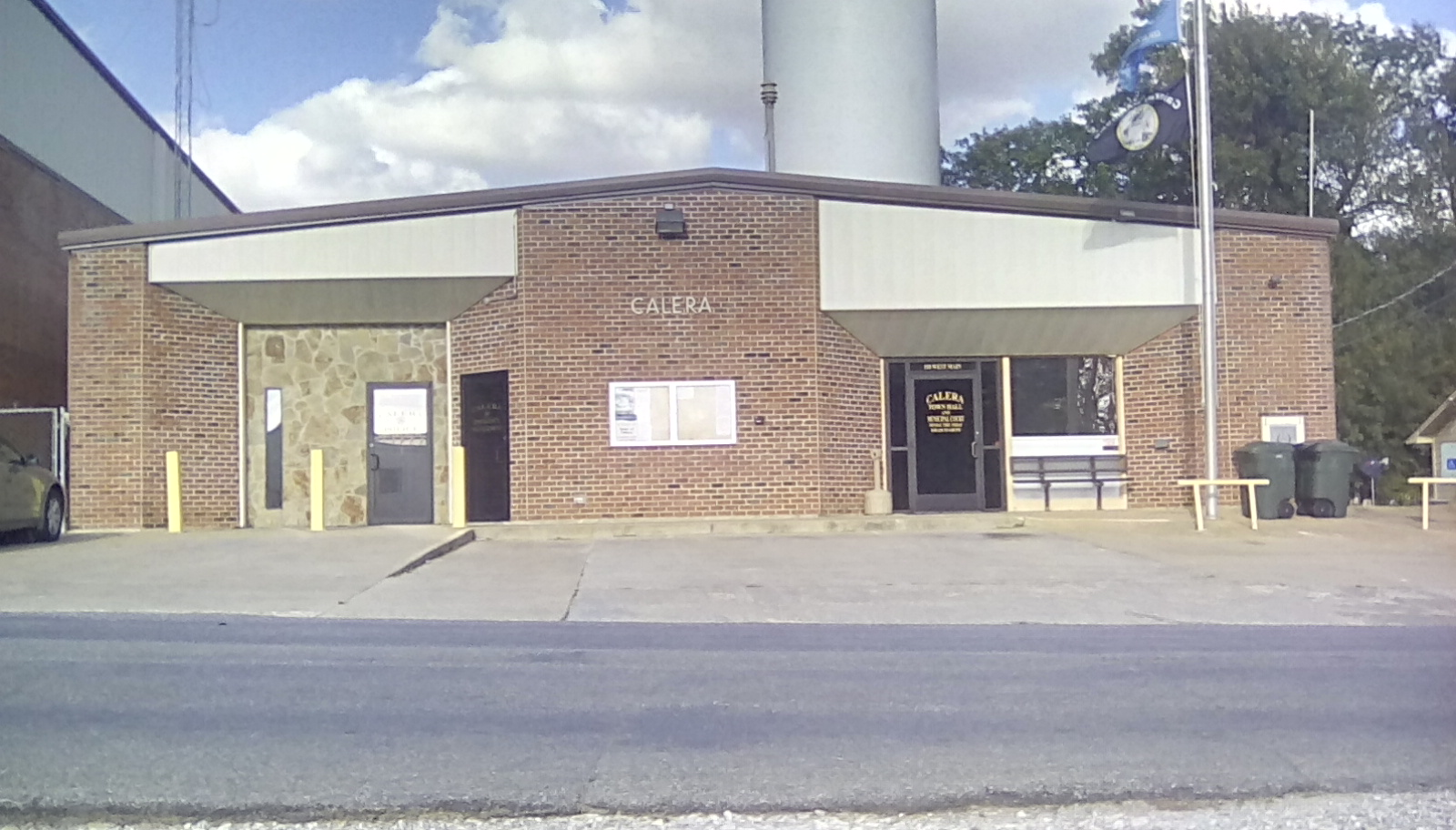
- Calera, Oklahoma City Hall

- Flag Seal

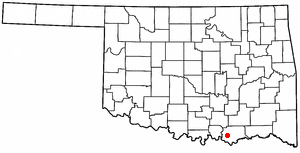
- Location of Calera, Oklahoma
- Coordinates: 33°55′49″N 96°25′45″W
- Country: United States
- State: Oklahoma
- County: Bryan

Area
  - Total: 5.36 sq mi (13.89 km^{2})
  - Land: 5.30 sq mi (13.72 km^{2})
  - Water: 0.066 sq mi (0.17 km^{2})
- Elevation: 699 ft (213 m)

Population (2020)
  - Total: 2,916
  - Density: 550.5/sq mi (212.54/km^{2})
- Time zone: UTC-6 (Central (CST))
  - Summer (DST): UTC-5 (CDT)
- ZIP code: 74730
- Area code: 580
- FIPS code: 40-10950
- GNIS feature ID: 2413148
- Website: caleraok.org

Calera is a town in Bryan County, Oklahoma, United States, And is part of the Dallas-Fort Worth combined statistical area. The population was 2,906 at the 2020 census, an increase of 34.2 percent over the figure of 2,164 recorded in 2010 indicating that Calera is experiencing larger growth than Durant and other surrounding areas. It is also part of the Durant Micropolitan Area, as well as being part of the Texoma region.

== Geography ==
According to the United States Census Bureau, the town has a total area of 2.6 square miles (6.7 km^{2}), all land.

The Calera town limits borders the Southern Durant city limits, but the actual downtown areas of Calera and Durant are five miles apart.

== History ==
Calera was formerly known as Cale Switch or Cale, when in 1872 the Missouri, Kansas and Texas Railway built a railroad through the Choctaw Nation, and the small community was established on the east side of the tracks. The name Cale came from railroad official George W. Cale. Seventeen years later, the people of Cale Switch, Indian Territory had their first post office. That same year the town was given the name Sterrett, but Katy, also referred to as Missouri, Kansas, and Texas Railway, railroad officials refused to call it by that name. The debate continued for twenty-one years when finally in 1910 the town accepted the name Calera.

At the time of its founding Cale was located in Blue County, a part of the Moshulatubbee District of the Choctaw Nation.

== Demographics ==
Historical population
Census	Pop.	Note	%±
1900	575		—
1910	575		0.0%
1920	703		22.3%
1930	503		−28.4%
1940	597		18.7%
1950	643		7.7%
1960	592		−7.9%
1970	1,063		79.6%
1980	1,390		30.8%
1990	1,536		10.5%
2000	1,739		13.2%
2010	2,164		24.4%
2020	2,916		34.8%
U.S. Decennial Census

=== 2020 census ===
As of the 2020 census, Calera had a population of 2,916. The median age was 32.5 years. 26.0% of residents were under the age of 18 and 15.1% of residents were 65 years of age or older. For every 100 females there were 90.7 males, and for every 100 females age 18 and over there were 86.9 males age 18 and over.

79.2% of residents lived in urban areas, while 20.8% lived in rural areas.

There were 1,149 households in Calera, of which 35.1% had children under the age of 18 living in them. Of all households, 40.6% were married-couple households, 20.2% were households with a male householder and no spouse or partner present, and 29.8% were households with a female householder and no spouse or partner present. About 29.3% of all households were made up of individuals and 11.2% had someone living alone who was 65 years of age or older.

There were 1,214 housing units, of which 5.4% were vacant. The homeowner vacancy rate was 0.8% and the rental vacancy rate was 4.3%.

Racial composition as of the 2020 census
Race	Number	Percent
White	1,860	63.8%
Black or African American	41	1.4%
American Indian and Alaska Native	515	17.7%
Asian	23	0.8%
Native Hawaiian and Other Pacific Islander	1	0.0%
Some other race	37	1.3%
Two or more races	439	15.1%
Hispanic or Latino (of any race)	191	6.6%

== Economy ==
Calera is a growing town with a thriving tourism industry, thanks to the nearby Choctaw Casinos & Resorts, which attracts many travelers and tourists to the area. The town has seen significant economic growth in recent years, with an increase in new eating establishments.

In addition to its tourism industry, Calera is actively recruiting businesses that can contribute to the town's sales tax revenue. With a sales tax rate of 9%, which includes state, county, and city taxes, businesses in Calera have the potential to generate significant revenue. Calera also owns several properties that are available for retail businesses interested in starting or expanding in the town.

== Transportation ==
Calera is situated along U.S. 69/75, the second busiest north-south route in Oklahoma, after Interstate 35. The Union Pacific Railroad runs through Calera on the East Side of US 69/75

== Educational system ==
Calera is home to Calera Public Schools which is currently classified as 2A by the OSSAA (Oklahoma Secondary Schools Activities Association). The average enrollment is approximately 700 students. The school mascot is the Calera Bulldogs and Lady Bulldogs. The schools consist of Calera Early Childhood, Calera Elementary, and Calera High School. Calera Early Childhood is for children who are between the grades of Head-Start and First Grade. The Elementary School is for students who are between the grades of Second and Sixth. Calera High School consists of students between Seventh and Twelfth grads.

=== Extracurricular Activities ===
In 1995, Calera High School's Academic team won the Oklahoma Secondary Schools Activities Association State Championship. Through the years, the Academic Team has continued to be successful. The Calera boys' basketball program has advanced to the state tournament seven times, and is home to the 1956 Class B Boys State Champions. In 2014, the Calera girls' softball basketball team was named Area Quarterfinalist. Calera is also home to three individual cross-country state champions, as well as three 1600m state champions, won by former East Central University cross-country runner, Cale Eidson. The Calera softball team has been successful in the last few years. In the 2014, 2015, and 2016 Slow-Pitch season the girls advanced to the state tournament. The 2014 season was the first time any girls' team at Calera High School had made it to a state tournament. The local FFA Chapter was named Three Star National FFA Chapter and the National Convention form 2007 through 2011, and has experienced major successes in Career Development Events at the State and National levels.

== Notable people ==
- Jason Meadows, Country music artist and Nashville Star runner-Up
