= Help Pour Out the Rain (Lacey's Song) =

"Help Pour Out the Rain (Lacey's song)"

Single by Buddy Jewell

from the album Buddy Jewell
- B-side: "Then You Can Tell Me Goodbye"
- Released: May 5, 2003
- Genre: Country
- Length: 3:49
- Label: Columbia Nashville
- Songwriter: Buddy Jewell
- Producer: Clint Black

Buddy Jewell singles chronology
"Help Pour Out the Rain (Lacey's song)" (2003)	"Sweet Southern Comfort" (2003)

"Help Pour Out the Rain (Lacey's Song)" is a song written and recorded by American country music artist Buddy Jewell. It was released in May 2003 as the lead-off single from his self-titled debut album. It peaked at number 3 on the United States Billboard Hot Country Singles & Tracks chart and at number 29 on the U.S. Billboard Hot 100 chart. The song was the highest-debuting single by a new country artist since the inception of Nielsen SoundScan in 1990.

== Content ==
"Help Pour Out the Rain" is sub-titled "Lacey's Song" for Jewell's daughter. In the song, the narrator and his daughter are riding in a car. The daughter asks him questions about what will happen when she dies and goes to Heaven. In the second verse, the narrator thanks God for his children and their innocence.

== Critical reception ==
Deborah Evans Price, of Billboard magazine reviewed the song favorably, saying that Jewell "incorporates several of the elements that always seem to strike a chord with country audiences - the wisdom of children, a glimpse of heaven, and a father's love." She goes on to say that the song is "enveloped in a pretty melody laced with a sweet, soaring fiddle."

== Music video ==
The music video was filmed on May 26, 2003. It was directed by Jon Small and Don Lepore.

== Chart performance ==
"Help Pour Out the Rain (Lacey's Song)" debuted at number 44 on the U.S. Billboard Hot Country Singles & Tracks for the week of May 24, 2003.

Chart (2003)	Peak position
US Hot Country Songs (Billboard)	3
US Billboard Hot 100	29

=== Year-end charts ===
Chart (2003)	Position
US Country Songs (Billboard)	25
