= Brad Cotter =

American country music singer

- Born: Thomas Bradley Cotter; September 29, 1970 (age 55)
- Origin: Opelika, Alabama, United States
- Genre: Country
- Occupation: Singer-songwriter
- Instrument: Vocals
- Years active: 2004–present
- Labels: Epic Nashville, Adobe Road, OMG
- Formerly of: Silverado
- Website: www.bradcotter.com

Thomas Bradley Cotter (born September 29, 1970) is an American country music singer who won the 2004 season of Nashville Star a talent competition on the USA Network. Signed to Epic Records that year, he released his debut album Patient Man, which produced three singles on the Billboard country charts, including the No. 35 "I Meant To". An independent EP, Continuity, followed in 2007.

== Biography ==
Born in Opelika, Alabama, Cotter trained with Jerry Redd, who had performed with Elvis Presley and the gospel music group The Stamps Quartet. His first public performance was at the age of nine in a church in Columbus, Georgia. He recorded five gospel records in the next eight years, and was voted the "top child Gospel soloist in America". He dropped out of performing in his late teen years, then returned to music in Auburn, where he joined the group Silverado.

Cotter left Silverado in 1993 and moved to Nashville, Tennessee, where he tried to get work as a solo act and a songwriter, landing cuts by Tommy Shane Steiner and Chad Brock, in addition to recording demos. He later competed on and won Nashville Star, then signed to a recording contract with Epic Records. Cotter's debut album Patient Man was released in mid-2004 via Epic, with production by songwriter Steve Bogard. This album produced three chart singles on the country charts, including the Top 40 "I Meant To", but Cotter exited the label before Epic closed its Nashville division in 2005. In 2007, Cotter signed with Adobe Road Records in Nashville, releasing an EP called Continuity.

In 2009, Cotter and Bogard reunited, and Cotter signed to OMG Records. His second full album, Right on Time, was released in June 2009.

== Discography ==
=== Studio albums ===
Title	Album details	Peak chart positions	
Title	Album details	US Country	US
Patient Man	Release date: July 6, 2004; Label: Epic Nashville	4	27
Right on Time	Release date: June 9, 2009; Label: OMG Records	—	—
"—" denotes releases that did not chart

=== Extended plays ===
Title	Album details
Continuity	Release date: 2007; Label: Adobe Road Records

=== Singles ===
Year	Single	Peak positions	Album
Year	Single	US Country	Album
2004	"I Meant To"	35	Patient Man
2004	"Can't Tell Me Nothin'"	59	Patient Man
2004	"I Miss Me"	59	Patient Man
2007	"God's Fingerprints"	—	Continuity
"—" denotes releases that did not chart

=== Music videos ===
Year	Video	Director
2004	"I Meant To"	Peter Zavadil
