= Erika Jo =

American singer-songwriter

- Born: Erika Jo Heriges; November 2, 1986 (age 39); Angleton, Texas, U.S.
- Origin: Mount Juliet, Tennessee, U.S.
- Genre: Country
- Occupation: Singer
- Years active: 2005–2007
- Label: Universal South

Erika Jo Vastola (née Heriges, born November 2, 1986, in Angleton, Texas), known simply by the stage name Erika Jo, is an American country music recording artist who was declared winner of the 2005 season of the Nashville Star television program. Eighteen years old at the time, Erika Jo is both the youngest person to win the competition and the first female winner. She was signed to Universal South Records in 2005 and released her self-titled debut album, which produced a chart single in "I Break Things", a No. 53 on the Billboard Hot Country Songs charts. A second single from the album, a cover of the Jessi Colter hit, "I'm Not Lisa", failed to chart, and she was dropped from Universal South in 2007.

== Early life ==
Erika Jo is the daughter of Bo and Paige Heriges. Erika Jo grew up in Mount Juliet, Tennessee, 15 miles east of Nashville, and is a 2005 graduate of Wilson Central High School in Lebanon, Tennessee.

== Career ==
Erika Jo was also a national finalist in the 1999 True Value Country Showdown (now called the Colgate Country Showdown), a talent competition consisting of regional winners from across the United States. She also competed on the singing competition Nashville Star in 2005 and won first place.

Her first single, "I Break Things", was released immediately upon her Nashville Star victory. The music video received heavy rotation on CMT and GAC, but the song peaked at No. 53. One subsequent single ("I'm Not Lisa") was released; it failed to reach the charts. Her only professional album, Erika Jo, was released by Universal South Records on June 14, 2005 and debuted at No. 5 on Billboard's country album chart, but the album, like its first single, enjoyed very limited success after its initial launch, selling just 118,829 copies through its first 11 months in release. She was later dropped from Universal South.

== Discography ==
=== Studio albums ===
Title	Album details	Peak chart positions	
Title	Album details	US Country	US
Erika Jo	Release date: June 14, 2005; Label: Universal South Records; Formats: CD, music download	5	27

=== Singles ===
Year	Single	Peak positions	Album
Year	Single	US Country	Album
2005	"I Break Things"	53	Erika Jo
2005	"I'm Not Lisa"	—	Erika Jo
"—" denotes releases that did not chart

=== Music videos ===
Year	Video	Director
2005	"I Break Things"	Warren P. Sonoda
