= Buddy Jewell (album) =

Studio album by Buddy Jewell
- Released: July 1, 2003
- Genre: Country
- Length: 43:24
- Label: Columbia
- Producer: Clint Black

Buddy Jewell chronology
Far Enough Away (2002)	Buddy Jewell (2003)	Times Like These (2005)

Professional ratings
Review scores
Source	Rating
Allmusic	3/5 stars

Buddy Jewell is the third studio album by American country music singer Buddy Jewell. The album was Jewell's major-label debut and his first album since winning season one of Nashville Star. As part of the Nashville Star prize, the album was produced by Clint Black and recorded entirely in ten days.

Buddy Jewell was released on July 1, 2003, by Columbia Records. It debuted at #1 on Billboard's Top Country Albums chart with sales of 51,765 copies, the third highest first week sales of a debut album since the inception of Nielsen SoundScan in 1991. The album has since been certified Gold by the RIAA for sales of 500,000 copies.

The first two singles released from the album, "Help Pour Out the Rain (Lacey's Song)" and "Sweet Southern Comfort," both reached the Top 5 of Billboard's Hot Country Songs chart in 2003. A third single, "One Step at a Time," reached the Top 40 the following year. Also included is "Today I Started Loving You Again," a duet with fellow Nashville Star contestant Miranda Lambert on a song co-written and previously recorded by Merle Haggard. "Abilene on Her Mind" and "One in a Row" were previously included on Jewell's 2001 independent release, One in a Row.

== Track listing ==
No.	Title	Writer(s)	Length
1.	"I Wanna Thank Everyone"	Marty Dodson, Tom Shapiro	4:33
2.	"Help Pour Out the Rain (Lacey's Song)"	Buddy Jewell	3:49
3.	"Sweet Southern Comfort"	Rodney Clawson, Brad Crisler	3:32
4.	"Today I Started Loving You Again" (duet with Miranda Lambert)	Merle Haggard, Bonnie Owens	4:07
5.	"Abilene on Her Mind"	Jewell, Jim Weaver	3:50
6.	"One in a Row"	Jewell, Thom McHugh	3:22
7.	"O'Reilly Luck"	Will Rambeaux, Thom Shepherd, Steve Williams	4:24
8.	"Why We Said Goodbye"	Tom Douglas, Billy Kirsch	3:42
9.	"One Step at a Time"	Burton Banks Collins, Stacy Widelitz	3:38
10.	"I Can Get By"	Clint Black	4:27
11.	"You Know How Women Are"	Dave Duncan, J. Fred Knobloch	4:00

== Personnel ==
Adapted from liner notes.

- Eddie Bayers - drums
- Clint Black - bass harmonica (tracks 3, 7), harmonica (track 2, 9, 11), background vocals (track 3)
- Dane Bryant - synthesizer (track 8)
- Mark Casstevens - banjo (track 3)
- Lisa Cochran - background vocals
- Stuart Duncan - fiddle, mandolin
- Larry Franklin - fiddle (track 2)
- Paul Franklin - dobro, steel guitar
- James Garner - harmonica (track 3)
- Wes Hightower - background vocals (track 2)
- Buddy Jewell - lead vocals
- Miranda Lambert - duet vocals (track 4)
- Brent Mason - electric guitar
- Larry Paxton - bass guitar (track 2)
- Matt Rollings - piano
- John Wesley Ryles - background vocals
- Biff Watson - acoustic guitar, classical guitar
- Glenn Worf - bass guitar

== Charts ==
=== Weekly charts ===
Chart (2003)	Peak position
US Billboard 200	13
US Top Country Albums (Billboard)	1

=== Year-end charts ===
Chart (2003)	Position
US Top Country Albums (Billboard)	34
Chart (2004)	Position
US Top Country Albums (Billboard)	48
