= Times Like These (Buddy Jewell album) =

Studio album by Buddy Jewell
- Released: April 26, 2005
- Genre: Country
- Length: 39:40
- Label: Columbia
- Producer: Garth Fundis

Buddy Jewell chronology
Buddy Jewell (2003)	Times Like These (2005)	Country Enough (2008)

Professional ratings
Review scores
Source	Rating
Allmusic	3/5 stars

Times Like These is the fourth studio album by American country music singer Buddy Jewell. The album was released on April 26, 2005, by Columbia Records. Two singles were released from the project, "If She Were Any Other Woman" and "So Gone." While the former peaked in the Top 30 of Billboard's Hot Country Songs chart, the latter failed to chart entirely.

Sales of Times Like These failed to meet those of Jewell's debut, and he was dropped by Columbia in September 2005.

== Track listing ==
No.	Title	Writer(s)	Length
1.	"Me Lovin' You"	Rick Bowles, Josh Leo	3:09
2.	"If She Were Any Other Woman"	Brett Beavers, Connie Harrington, Kelley Lovelace	3:17
3.	"Back to You"	Walt Aldridge, Brad Crisler	3:08
4.	"So Gone"	Marc Beeson, Paul Jefferson, Sonny LeMaire	2:59
5.	"You Ain't Doin' Right"	Tony Lane, Craig Wiseman	3:30
6.	"Addicted to the Rain"	Larry Wayne Clark, Buddy Jewell	3:40
7.	"I'd Run"	Jimmy Ritchey, Sam Tate, Annie Tate	4:09
8.	"Dyess Arkansas"	Jewell	4:47
9.	"Glad I'm Gone"	Jewell	3:35
10.	"Times Like These"	Jewell, J. B. Rudd, Vip Vipperman	3:30
11.	"Run Away Home"	Burton Collins, D. Vincent Williams	3:56

== Personnel ==
Adapted from liner notes.

- Eddie Bayers - drums, percussion
- Kevin Collier - electric guitar
- J.T. Corenflos - electric guitar
- Stuart Duncan - fiddle, mandolin
- Troy Engle - fiddle
- Shannon Forrest - drums
- Larry Franklin - fiddle
- Paul Franklin - dobro, steel guitar
- Garth Fundis - background vocals
- Vince Gill - background vocals
- Lloyd Green - dobro
- Wes Hightower - background vocals
- John Hobbs - organ, piano
- Buddy Jewell - lead vocals, background vocals
- Rich Lloyd - bass guitar
- Brent Mason - acoustic guitar, electric guitar, nylon string guitar
- Billy Panda - acoustic guitar
- Steve Paxton - piano
- Mickey Raphael - harmonica
- Michael Rhodes - bass guitar
- Dave Ristrim - steel guitar
- Marty Slayton - background vocals
- Kenneth Smith - drums
- Harry Stinson - background vocals
- Bryan Sutton - banjo, acoustic guitar
- Reese Wynans - Fender Rhodes, organ

== Chart performance ==
Chart (2005)	Peak position
U.S. Billboard Top Country Albums	5
U.S. Billboard 200	31
