= Buddy Jewell =

American country music singer (born 1961)

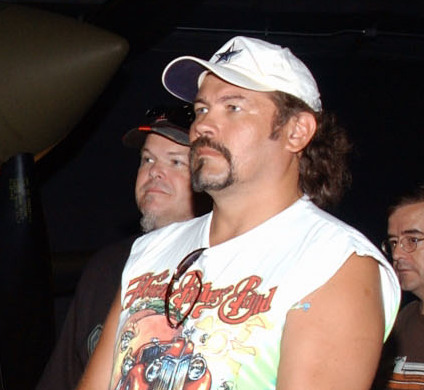
- Jewell in 2005

Background information
- Born: Buddy Jewell Jr. April 2, 1961 (age 64)
- Origin: Lepanto, Arkansas, US
- Genres: Country
- Occupation: Singer-songwriter
- Instrument: Vocals
- Years active: 2001–present
- Labels: My Little Jewell, Columbia, New Revolution, Lamon
- Website: buddyjewell.com

Buddy Jewell Jr. (born April 2, 1961) is an American country music singer who was the first winner on the USA Network talent show Nashville Star. Signed to Columbia Records in 2003, Jewell made his debut on the American country music scene with the release of his self-titled album, which produced the singles "Help Pour Out the Rain" and "Sweet Southern Comfort". Another album, Times Like These, followed in 2005.

== Biography ==
Buddy Jewell was born in Lepanto, Arkansas, on April 2, 1961. He began playing guitar after buying one from a schoolmate during childhood, and saved the money that he earned bagging groceries to buy guitar lesson books. Jewell also listened to the music that his father, also named Buddy, played for him, and was taught by his uncle Clyde how to play "What a Friend We Have in Jesus". By age 15, Jewell had also taught himself how to play Johnny Cash's "I Still Miss Someone." After graduating from Osceola High School, he attended Arkansas State University where he was a member of Pi Kappa Alpha. Jewell majored in television and radio in college, although he left in his junior year to marry, despite the marriage only lasting two-and-a-half years.

Jewell later moved to Camden, Arkansas, at age 21 in pursuit of a musical career. There, he discovered a band called White Oak, which was seeking a new lead singer. This band was sponsored by a booking agency whose roster also included Canyon and a band founded by a then-unknown Trace Adkins. After touring with White Oak for four years, he moved to Dallas, Texas, where he took a role in a gunfighting show at Six Flags over Texas. He later entered a singing competition that was sponsored by the band Alabama, whose music was also an inspiration to him. He won the competition's top prize, which was an opening slot for the band.

After winning the competition, he competed on Star Search where he won Male Vocalist on several episodes. He later decided to move to Nashville, Tennessee, in 1993, and found work two years later as a demo singer. As a demo singer, he recorded more than 5,000 demos. Among the songs that Jewell recorded demos for were "Write This Down" for George Strait, "A Little Past Little Rock" for Lee Ann Womack, "The One" for Gary Allan and "You're Beginning to Get to Me" for Clay Walker. Jewell also self-released albums entitled One in a Row and Far Enough Away in 2001 and 2002 respectively. In 1999, he appeared on comedian Bill Engvall's album Dorkfish, providing vocals to the track "I'm a Cowboy" and appearing in its music video.

== Nashville Star and major-label music career ==
In 2003, Jewell competed in the first season of the television singing competition Nashville Star. He became the show's first winner that season, and was soon signed to a recording contract with Columbia Records Nashville.

=== 2003–2004: Buddy Jewell ===
On May 5, 2003, two days after his win, Jewell's debut single "Help Pour Out the Rain" was shipped to radio. It became the highest-debuting single by a new country artist since the singles charts were first tabulated via Nielsen SoundScan in 1990. This song reached number three on the country charts and 29 on the pop charts. It was the first single from his self-titled debut album, which was produced by former RCA Records artist Clint Black and was recorded in ten days. Buddy Jewell sold 500,000 copies and earned a gold certification from the Recording Industry Association of America (RIAA), in addition to producing a second number three country hit in "Sweet Southern Comfort", which also reached number 40 on the pop charts. This song was followed by the number 38 country single "One Step at a Time".

=== 2004–2005: Times Like These ===
Jewell's second album for Columbia, Times Like These, was released in 2005. This album did not perform as well at radio, with its first single ("If She Were Any Other Woman") reaching number 27 on the charts, and the second single ("So Gone") failing to chart entirely. By the end of the year, Jewell was dropped from Columbia's roster.

=== 2005–2011: Country Enough ===
He did not release another single until "This Ain't Mexico" in 2008, a self-released single. This was included on an album entitled Country Enough, which was released on Diamond Dust Records in 2008. In May 2011 Jewell released a new album "I Surrender All". He released two songs from this album "Jesus, Elvis, And Me" which was a country dance hit and "Somebody Who Would Die For You" which went up to No. 1 on the Christian Charts.

=== 2015: My Father's Country ===
In 2015, Jewell signed with Lamon Records in Nashville and recorded an album produced with Grammy nominated artist-producer Dave Moody. The album My Father's Country featured a collection of classic country songs, including Abilene, Behind Closed Doors, Galveston and other songs Jewell grew up listening to his father sing. Buddy Jewell was inducted into the Arkansas Entertainers Hall of Fame on Tuesday, September 29, 2015, at the Noah's Event Center in Little Rock, AR.

=== 2017–2019 ===
In 2017 Jewell recorded an EP album "Reloaded". His single from the album is "I'm There" and it went to number one on the Power Source Christian Country charts.

== Discography ==
=== Studio albums ===
Title	Album details	Peak chart positions		Certifications (sales thresholds)
Title	Album details	US Country	US	Certifications (sales thresholds)
One in a Row	Release date: 2001; Label: self-released; Formats: CD	—	—	
Far Enough Away	Release date: 2002; Label: self-released; Formats: CD	—	—	
Buddy Jewell	Release date: July 1, 2003; Label: Columbia Records; Formats: CD, music download	1	13	US: Gold
Times Like These	Release date: April 26, 2005; Label: Columbia Records; Formats: CD, music download	5	31	
Country Enough	Release date: July 1, 2008; Label: Diamond Dust Records; Formats: CD, music download	—	—	
I Surrender All	Release date: July 12, 2011; Label: Diamond Dust Records; Formats: CD, music download	—	—	
My Father's Country	Release date: June 12, 2015; Label: Lamon Records, Nashville; Formats: CD, music download	—	—	
Reloaded	Release date: April 2, 2017; Label: Better Music, Nashville; Formats: CD, music download	—	—	
Shine On	Release date: February 20, 2019; Label: Better Music, Nashville; Formats: CD, music download	–	–	
Bluebonnet Highway	Release date: April 2020 Label: Diamond Dust Records Producer: Mitchell Brown Formats: CD, music downloads	-	25	
"—" denotes releases that did not chart

=== Singles ===
Year	Single	Peak chart positions		Album
Year	Single	US Country	US	Album
2003	"Help Pour Out the Rain (Lacey's Song)"	3	29	Buddy Jewell
2003	"Sweet Southern Comfort"	3	40	Buddy Jewell
2004	"One Step at a Time"	38	—	Buddy Jewell
2004	"If She Were Any Other Woman"	27	—	Times Like These
2005	"So Gone"	—	—	Times Like These
2008	"This Ain't Mexico"	—	—	Country Enough
2008	"Dance with My Father"	—	—	Country Enough
2009	"Somebody Who Would Die for You"	—	—	I Surrender All
2011	"Jesus, Elvis and Me"	—	—	I Surrender All
2015	"Behind Closed Doors"	—	—	My Father's Country
2020	"Bluebonnet Highway"	—	—	Bluebonnet Highway
"—" denotes releases that did not chart

=== Music videos ===
Year	Video	Director
2003	"Help Pour Out the Rain (Lacey's Song)"	Jon Small
2003	"Sweet Southern Comfort"	Eric Welch
2005	"If She Were Any Other Woman"	David McClister
