= John Arthur Martinez =

American singer-songwriter

- Born: June 10, 1961 (age 64)
- Origin: Austin, Texas, United States
- Genres: Country
- Occupation: Singer-songwriter
- Instrument(s): Vocals, guitar
- Years active: 1998–present
- Labels: Dualtone

John Arthur Martinez (born June 10, 1961, in Austin, Texas) is an American country music artist. Martinez finished in second place on the first season of the USA Network talent show Nashville Star. In 2004, Martinez released a studio album for Dualtone Records, which produced one single on the Billboard Hot Country Singles & Tracks chart.

== Discography ==
=== Albums ===
Title	Album details	Peak chart positions		
Title	Album details	US Country	US Heat	US Indie
Spinning Our Wheels	Release date: 1998; Label: JAM	—	—	—
On the Border	Release date: May 14, 2001; Label: Texas Song	—	—	—
Stand Your Ground	Release date: September 18, 2001; Label: JAM	—	—	—
Lone Starry Night	Release date: May 4, 2004; Label: DualTone	49	37	28
Rodeo Night	Release date: May 14, 2007; Label: AGR	—	—	—
Purgatory Road	Release date: September 15, 2009; Label: Apache Ranch Records	—	—	—
"—" denotes releases that did not chart

=== Singles ===
Year	Single	Peak positions	Album
Year	Single	US Country	Album
2004	"Home Made of Stone"	56	Lone Starry Night
2004	"Amarillo by Morning"	—	Lone Starry Night
2004	"If I Didn't Care"	—	Lone Starry Night
2009	"Utopia"	—	Purgatory Road
2010	"You Can't Outdrink the Truth"	—	Purgatory Road
"—" denotes releases that did not chart
