= Do You Believe Me Now (album) =

Studio album by Jimmy Wayne
- Released: August 26, 2008
- Genre: Country
- Length: 44:21
- Label: Valory Music Group
- Producers: Mark Bright; Dave Pahanish; Joe West; Scott Borchetta (exec.)

Jimmy Wayne chronology
Jimmy Wayne (2003)	Do You Believe Me Now (2008)	Sara Smile (2009)

Singles from Do You Believe Me Now
- 1. "Do You Believe Me Now" Released: March 31, 2008; 2. "I Will" Released: October 6, 2008; 3. "I'll Be That" Released: May 26, 2009

Professional ratings
Review scores
Source	Rating
Country Standard Time	

Do You Believe Me Now is the second studio album by American country music singer Jimmy Wayne. It was released on August 26, 2008. The album is also Wayne's first album in five years and his debut for Valory Music Group, a subsidiary of Big Machine Records. Its title track was released as the lead-off single to the album, and became Wayne's first and only Number One single on the Hot Country Songs chart. "I Will" was released in October 2008 as the album's second single. It also includes re-recordings of Wayne's first two singles, "Stay Gone" and "I Love You This Much", previously included on his 2003 self-titled debut. Dave Pahanish and Joe West produced the album except tracks 3, 5, and 9, which were produced by Mark Bright.

== Track listing ==
No.	Title	Writer(s)	Length
1.	"Do You Believe Me Now"	Joe West, Dave Pahanish, Tim Johnson	3:26
2.	"I Will"	Pahanish, Rory Feek	3:57
3.	"I'll Be That"	Jimmy Wayne, Bob Regan, Kevin Paige	4:06
4.	"Brighter Days"	Pahanish, West	3:47
5.	"One on One"	Wayne, Mark Nesler, Tony Martin	3:25
6.	"Kerosene Kid"	Wayne, Don Sampson	3:26
7.	"No Good for Me" (duet with Patty Loveless)	Wayne, Billy Kirsch	3:12
8.	"True Believer"	Lori McKenna, Liz Rose	3:20
9.	"I Didn't Come Here to Lose"	Wendell Mobley, Neil Thrasher, Jason Sellers	3:40
10.	"Where You're Going"	Wayne, Sampson	4:17
11.	"Stay Gone"	Wayne, Kirsch	3:43
12.	"I Love You This Much"	Wayne, Sampson, Chris DuBois	4:02

== Personnel ==
Adapted from Do You Believe Me Now liner notes.

=== Musicians ===
- Tim Akers - keyboards (3, 5, 9)
- Tom Bukovac - electric guitar (2, 4, 5, 6, 8, 9)
- Mark Burch - strings (11, 12)
- Jake Clayton - fiddle (10–12), mandolin (11, 12)
- Eric Darken - percussion (3, 5, 9)
- Shannon Forrest - drums (3, 5, 9)
- Wes Hightower - background vocals (3, 5, 9)
- Mark Hill - bass guitar (2, 4, 8, 11, 12)
- Mike Johnson - steel guitar (3, 5, 9)
- Charlie Judge - strings (2)
- Billy Kirsch - piano (2, 7, 11, 12), strings (7)
- Patty Loveless - duet vocal (7)
- John Oates - background vocals (10)
- Dave Pahanish - acoustic guitar (1, 2, 4, 6–8, 10–12), banjo (1, 4, 10), background vocals (1, 2, 4, 6, 8, 10–12), electric guitar (1, 2, 4, 6, 8, 10), high-strung guitar (1), mandolin (1, 2, 4, 7, 10)
- Jeanne Richardson - background vocals (2)
- John Richarsdon - drums (1, 2, 4, 6, 7, 8, 10–12), percussion (7), congas (12)
- Scotty Sanders - steel guitar (1, 2, 4, 6–8, 10, 11)
- Jimmie Lee Sloas - bass guitar (3, 5, 9)
- Biff Watson - acoustic guitar (3, 5, 9)
- Jimmy Wayne - acoustic guitar (1, 2, 4, 6, 8, 10)
- Joe West - acoustic guitar (1), background vocals (1, 2, 4, 6, 8, 10, 12), bass guitar (1, 6, 7, 10), electric guitar (1, 2, 4, 6–8, 10–12), Hammond B-3 organ (1, 2, 4, 6–8, 10), high-strung guitar (1, 11), percussion (1, 2, 4, 6–8, 10–12), piano (1, 2, 4, 10), programming (2, 4, 6, 7, 10–12), Rhodes piano (2), synthesizer (2, 4, 10)
- Jonathan Yudkin - fiddle (3, 9), violin (5), viola (5), cello (5), string bass (5), mandolin (5, 9)

=== Technical ===
- Chris Ashburn - assistant (3, 5, 9)
- Derek Bason - recording (3, 5, 9), mixing (3, 5, 9)
- Scott Borchetta - executive producer
- Mark Bright - producer (3, 5, 9)
- Dave Brown - additional engineering (7)
- Jason Campbell - production coordinator (1, 2, 4, 6–8, 10–12)
- Mike "Frog" Griffith - production coordinator (3, 5, 9)
- Charlie Judge - string arrangement (2)
- Billy Kirsch - string arrangement (7)
- Brent Newberry - assistant (1), additional engineering (1, 4, 6, 8, 10–12), Pro Tools (2, 4, 6, 8, 10–12)
- Dave Pahanish - producer (1, 2, 4, 6–8, 10–12)
- Cord Phillips - recording (2, 4, 6–8, 10–12), Pro Tools (2, 4, 6–8, 10–12)
- Matt Pool - assistant (2, 4, 6–8, 10–12)
- J.R. Rodriguez - additional recording (3, 5, 9)
- Chase Sampson - assistant (2, 4, 6–8, 10–12)
- Al Theurer - additional engineering (7)
- Joe West - producer (1, 2, 4, 6–8, 10–12), recording (1, 2, 4, 6–8, 10–12), mixing (1, 2, 4, 6–8, 10–12), string arrangement (2)
- Zachary West - assistant (2, 4, 6–8, 10–12)
- Cole Wright - production assistant (1), additional engineering (2, 4, 6, 8, 10–12)
- Hank Williams - mastering (all tracks)

== Chart performance ==
The album debuted at number 27 on the Billboard 200 album chart, and number 4 on the Top Country Albums chart, selling 20,000 copies in its first week of sales.

=== Weekly charts ===
Chart (2008)	Peak position
US Billboard 200	27
US Top Country Albums (Billboard)	4

=== Year-end charts ===
Chart (2009)	Position
US Top Country Albums (Billboard)	71
