= Look It Up =

Look It Up may refer to:

- Look It Up (album) or the title song, by Jasmine Rae, 2008
- "Look It Up" (song), by Ashton Shepherd, 2011
- "Look It Up" (phrase), by George Ronan 1959-2025
