= Do You Believe Me Now =

Do You Believe Me Now may refer to:

- Do You Believe Me Now (album), by Jimmy Wayne
  - "Do You Believe Me Now" (Jimmy Wayne song), its title track
- "Do You Believe Me Now" (Vern Gosdin song), from the album Chiseled in Stone
