= When I Found You =

When I Found You can refer to:

- "When I Found You" (Michelle Wright song), 1999
- "When I Found You" (Jasmine Rae song), 2015
- "When I Found You", a bonus track on some versions of the 2001 Britney Spears' album, Britney
- When I Found You, a 1999 CD re-issue of the 1978 Mel Tormé / Buddy Rich Orchestra LP, Together Again: For the First Time
