= Santa's Little Helper (disambiguation) =

Santa's Little Helper or Santa's Little Helpers most commonly refers to:

- Santa's Little Helper, a cartoon dog in The Simpsons
- Christmas elves, folklore creatures who make toys in Santa Claus's workshop

It may also refer to:

== Film ==
- Santa's Little Helper (film) (2015), American comedy film
- Tom and Jerry: Santa's Little Helpers (2014), animated straight-to-DVD production

== Music ==
- Santa's Little Helper (EP) (2012), EP by Jasmine Rae

== Television ==
- "Santa's Little Helper", a 1993 episode of the American television show Boy Meets World
- "Santa's Little Helpers", a 1998 episode of Boy Meets World
- "SANTa's Little Helpers", a 2011 episode of the American television show A.N.T. Farm

== Literature ==
- Greg the Sausage Roll: Santa's Little Helper (2021), book by LadBaby
