= Trey Fanjoy =

American film and music video director

- Origin: South Carolina, U.S.
- Occupation: Music video director
- Years active: 1990s–present

Trey Fanjoy is an American music video director. Fanjoy has directed over 150 major label music videos. Her videos have appeared on CMT, VH1, GAC, The Nashville Network, CMT Canada, and MTV. She is the first woman to win the Country Music Association Award for Video of the Year and to date, the only woman to win the award twice and one of two people to win the award three times.

== Biography ==
Fanjoy was born in South Carolina. She studied acting with Sanford Meisner and was part of the Neighborhood Playhouse. Picture Vision Productions and director Jon Small, hired Fanjoy as a producer. From there, she went on to direct videos for Lonestar, Keith Urban, and Reba McEntire among others.

== Awards ==
| Year | Association | Nomination | Artist | Song title | Outcome |
|---|---|---|---|---|---|
| 2003 | CMT Flameworthy Awards | Breakthrough Video of the Year | Emerson Drive | "Fall into Me" | Nominated |
| 2004 | Canadian Country Music Association Awards | CMT Music Video of the Year | Emerson Drive | "Last One Standing" | Nominated |
| 2006 | CMT Music Awards | Breakthrough Video of the Year | Miranda Lambert | "Kerosene" | Nominated |
| 2006 | CMT Music Awards | Female Video of the Year | Miranda Lambert | "Kerosene" | Nominated |
| 2006 | CMT Music Awards | Video Director of the Year | Miranda Lambert | "Kerosene" | Nominated |
| 2006 | Academy of Country Music | Music Video of the Year | Miranda Lambert | "Kerosene" | Nominated |
| 2006 | Academy of Country Music | Music Video of the Year | Lee Ann Womack | "I May Hate Myself in the Morning" | Nominated |
| 2007 | CMT Music Awards | Breakthrough Video of the Year | Taylor Swift | "Tim McGraw" | Won |
| 2007 | Academy of Country Music Awards | Music Video of the Year | George Strait | "The Seashores of Old Mexico" | Nominated |
| 2008 | CMT Music Awards | Female Video of the Year | Taylor Swift | "Our Song" | Won |
| 2008 | CMT Music Awards | Video of the Year | Taylor Swift | "Our Song" | Won |
| 2008 | MTV Video Music Awards | Best New Artist | Taylor Swift | "Teardrops on My Guitar" | Nominated |
| 2008 | Country Music Association Awards | Music Video of the Year | Alan Jackson | "Good Time" | Nominated |
| 2008 | CMT Music Awards | Video Director of the Year | — | — | Nominated |
| 2009 | Country Music Association Awards | Music Video of the Year | Taylor Swift | "Love Story" | Won |
| 2009 | CMT Music Awards | Female Video of the Year | Taylor Swift | "Love Story" | Won |
| 2009 | CMT Music Awards | Video of the Year | Taylor Swift | "Love Story" | Won |
| 2009 | CMT Music Awards | Video Director of the Year | — | — | Won |
| 2010 | Country Music Association Awards | Video of the Year | Miranda Lambert | "The House That Built Me" | Won |
| 2020 | Country Music Association Awards | Video of the Year | Miranda Lambert | "Bluebird" | Won |

== Videos directed ==
226 music videos are currently listed here.

| Year | Video | Artist |
|---|---|---|
| 1997 | "Heart Hold On" | The Buffalo Club |
| 1998 | "Over My Shoulder" | John Berry |
| 1998 | "Better Than a Biscuit" | John Berry |
| 1998 | "What Am I Gonna Do (With All This Love)" | Seminole |
| 1998 | "She Don't Believe in Fairy Tales" | Jon Randall |
| 1998 | "Slow Down" | Mark Nesler |
| 1999 | "Amazed" | Lonestar |
| 1999 | "You Go First (Do You Wanna Kiss)" | Jessica Andrews |
| 1999 | "How Much Longer" | Sisters Wade |
| 1999 | "How Many Days" | Jack Ingram |
| 1999 | "Power Windows" | John Berry |
| 1999 | "Smile" | Lonestar |
| 2000 | "Your Everything" | Keith Urban |
| 2000 | "Bang Bang Boom" | The Moffatts |
| 2000 | "Prayin' for Daylight" | Rascal Flatts |
| 2000 | "Askin' Too Much" | Tamara Walker |
| 2000 | "Change" | Sons of the Desert |
| 2000 | "One Voice" | Billy Gilman |
| 2000 | "Beauty's in the Eye of the Beerholder" | Chuck Wagon and the Wheels |
| 2000 | "Send Down an Angel" | Allison Moorer |
| 2000 | "Kiss This" | Aaron Tippin |
| 2000 | "Everybody's Gotta Grow Up Sometime" | Sons of the Desert |
| 2000 | "Didn't We Love" | Tamara Walker |
| 2000 | "So What" | Tammy Cochran |
| 2000 | "But for the Grace of God" | Keith Urban |
| 2000 | "Oklahoma" | Billy Gilman |
| 2000 | "A Good Day to Run" | Darryl Worley |
| 2000 | "This Everyday Love" | Rascal Flatts |
| 2000 | "People Like Us" | Aaron Tippin |
| 2001 | "The Last Thing on My Mind" | Patty Loveless |
| 2001 | "I Want You Bad" | Charlie Robison |
| 2001 | "Ain't Nothing 'bout You" | Brooks & Dunn |
| 2001 | "When I Think About Angels" | Jamie O'Neal |
| 2001 | "Never Love You Enough" | Chely Wright |
| 2001 | "Loving Every Minute" | Mark Wills |
| 2001 | "Life Is Good" | Jacob Young |
| 2001 | "Right Man for the Job" | Charlie Robison |
| 2001 | "Whole Again" | Atomic Kitten |
| 2001 | "Where the Stars and Stripes and the Eagle Fly" | Aaron Tippin |
| 2001 | "I Cry" | Tammy Cochran |
| 2001 | "I Always Liked That Best" | Cyndi Thomson |
| 2001 | "Jezebel" | Chely Wright |
| 2002 | "Help Me Understand" | Trace Adkins |
| 2002 | "Some Dreams" | Steve Earle |
| 2002 | "Don't Waste My Time" | Little Big Town |
| 2002 | "I'm Gone" | Cyndi Thomson |
| 2002 | "One Thing" | Jack Ingram |
| 2002 | "Fall into Me" | Emerson Drive |
| 2002 | "Everything Changes" | Little Big Town |
| 2002 | "Somebody Like You" | Keith Urban |
| 2002 | "Beautiful Goodbye" | Jennifer Hanson |
| 2002 | "Brokenheartsville" | Joe Nichols |
| 2002 | "So Wrong" | Pam Tillis |
| 2002 | "Raining on Sunday" | Keith Urban |
| 2003 | "Speed" | Montgomery Gentry |
| 2003 | "Stay Gone" | Jimmy Wayne |
| 2003 | "Don't Come the Cowboy with Me, Sonny Jim!" (with Traci Goudie) | Kelly Willis |
| 2003 | "My Front Porch Looking In" | Lonestar |
| 2003 | "This Far Gone" | Jennifer Hanson |
| 2003 | "When You Come Around" | Deric Ruttan |
| 2003 | "Athens Grease" | Phil Vassar |
| 2003 | "Good Time" | Jessica Andrews |
| 2003 | "It's Five O'Clock Somewhere" | Alan Jackson with Jimmy Buffett |
| 2003 | "Hell Yeah" | Montgomery Gentry |
| 2003 | "I Love You This Much" | Jimmy Wayne |
| 2003 | "Jolene" | Mindy Smith with Dolly Parton |
| 2003 | "Remember When" | Alan Jackson |
| 2003 | "Heaven Help Me" | Wynonna Judd |
| 2003 | "Teacher's Pet" | Christy Carlson Romano |
| 2004 | "100 Years" | Five for Fighting |
| 2004 | "Last One Standing" | Emerson Drive |
| 2004 | "I Can't Sleep" | Clay Walker |
| 2004 | "Welcome Home" | Dolly Parton |
| 2004 | "If You Ever Stop Loving Me" | Montgomery Gentry |
| 2004 | "Somebody" | Reba McEntire |
| 2004 | "Back of the Bottom Drawer" | Chely Wright |
| 2004 | "Miss Being Mrs." | Loretta Lynn |
| 2004 | "How Far" | Martina McBride |
| 2004 | "If Nobody Believed in You" | Joe Nichols |
| 2004 | "It's All How You Look at It" | Tracy Lawrence |
| 2004 | "Hey Good Lookin'" (with Stan Kellam) | Jimmy Buffett and Friends |
| 2004 | "Rescue" | Uncle Kracker |
| 2004 | "Getaway Car" | The Jenkins |
| 2004 | "He Gets That from Me" | Reba McEntire |
| 2004 | "Me and Charlie Talking" | Miranda Lambert |
| 2004 | "Trip Around the Sun" | Jimmy Buffett with Martina McBride |
| 2004 | "Nothin' to Lose" | Josh Gracin |
| 2004 | "You're My Better Half" | Keith Urban |
| 2004 | "I May Hate Myself in the Morning" | Lee Ann Womack |
| 2005 | "Don't Worry 'bout a Thing" | SHeDAISY |
| 2005 | "Baby Won't You Come Home" | Jon Randall |
| 2005 | "Tiny Town" | Shelly Fairchild |
| 2005 | "Somebody's Hero" | Jamie O'Neal |
| 2005 | "Something Like a Broken Heart" | Hanna–McEuen |
| 2005 | "Cowgirls" | Kerry Harvick |
| 2005 | "Stay with Me (Brass Bed)" | Josh Gracin |
| 2005 | "Arlington" | Trace Adkins |
| 2005 | "You're Like Coming Home" | Lonestar |
| 2005 | "Nobody Gonna Tell Me What to Do" | Van Zant |
| 2005 | "She Didn't Have Time" | Terri Clark |
| 2005 | "Kerosene" | Miranda Lambert |
| 2005 | "XXL" | Keith Anderson |
| 2005 | "Fightin' For" | Cross Canadian Ragweed |
| 2005 | "Drunker Than Me" | Trent Tomlinson |
| 2005 | "I Don't" | Danielle Peck |
| 2006 | "I'm Taking the Wheel" | SHeDAISY |
| 2006 | "Lipstick" | Rockie Lynne |
| 2006 | "Love Needs a Holiday" | Reba McEntire |
| 2006 | "The Seashores of Old Mexico" | George Strait |
| 2006 | "Leave the Pieces" | The Wreckers |
| 2006 | "New Strings" | Miranda Lambert |
| 2006 | "Feels Just Like It Should" | Pat Green |
| 2006 | "Heartbreaker's Alibi" | Rhonda Vincent with Dolly Parton |
| 2006 | "Tim McGraw" | Taylor Swift |
| 2006 | "Wait for Me" | Bob Seger |
| 2006 | "Love Is" | Katrina Elam |
| 2006 | "Bama Breeze" | Jimmy Buffett |
| 2006 | "Honky Tonk Woman" | Jerry Lee Lewis with Kid Rock |
| 2006 | "Some People Change" | Montgomery Gentry |
| 2006 | "Dixie Lullaby" | Pat Green |
| 2007 | "Teardrops on My Guitar" | Taylor Swift |
| 2007 | "A Different World" | Bucky Covington |
| 2007 | "Famous in a Small Town" | Miranda Lambert |
| 2007 | "Joyride" | Jennifer Hanson |
| 2007 | "Bad for Me" | Danielle Peck |
| 2007 | "Heaven, Heartache and the Power of Love" | Trisha Yearwood |
| 2007 | "Our Song" | Taylor Swift |
| 2007 | "It's Good to Be Us" | Bucky Covington |
| 2008 | "This Is Me You're Talking To" | Trisha Yearwood |
| 2008 | "Stronger Woman" | Jewel |
| 2008 | "Picture to Burn" | Taylor Swift |
| 2008 | "Trying to Stop Your Leaving" | Dierks Bentley |
| 2008 | "That Song in My Head" | Julianne Hough |
| 2008 | "I Make The Dough, You Get The Glory" | Kathleen Edwards |
| 2008 | "Good Time" | Alan Jackson |
| 2008 | "Real Gone" | Billy Ray Cyrus |
| 2008 | "Beautiful Eyes" (with Todd Cassetty) | Taylor Swift |
| 2008 | "Last Call" | Lee Ann Womack |
| 2008 | "Troubadour" | George Strait |
| 2008 | "Love Story" | Taylor Swift |
| 2008 | "Muddy Water" | Trace Adkins |
| 2009 | "Like a Woman" | Jamie O'Neal |
| 2009 | "Sweet Thing" | Keith Urban |
| 2009 | "White Horse" | Taylor Swift |
| 2009 | "Backwoods Barbie" | Dolly Parton |
| 2009 | "Don't Chase Me" | Shea Fisher |
| 2009 | "Strange" | Reba McEntire |
| 2009 | "Solitary Thinkin'" | Lee Ann Womack |
| 2009 | "Keep On Lovin' You" | Steel Magnolia |
| 2009 | "Consider Me Gone" | Reba McEntire |
| 2009 | "Tomboy" | Krista Marie |
| 2009 | "The Call" | Matt Kennon |
| 2010 | "I Can't Make It Rain" | Houston County |
| 2010 | "Hip to My Heart" | The Band Perry |
| 2010 | "American Honey" | Lady Antebellum |
| 2010 | "The House That Built Me" | Miranda Lambert |
| 2010 | "Only Prettier" | Miranda Lambert |
| 2010 | "Come Back Song" | Darius Rucker |
| 2010 | "Who Are You When I'm Not Looking" | Blake Shelton |
| 2010 | "Gettin' Married" | Joanna Smith |
| 2011 | "The Shape I'm In" | Joe Nichols |
| 2011 | "This" | Darius Rucker |
| 2011 | "Tomorrow" | Chris Young |
| 2011 | "Honey Bee" | Blake Shelton |
| 2011 | "Just Fishin'" | Trace Adkins |
| 2011 | "Together You and I" | Dolly Parton |
| 2011 | "Long Hot Summer" | Keith Urban |
| 2011 | "God Gave Me You" | Blake Shelton |
| 2011 | "Where Country Grows" | Ashton Shepherd |
| 2011 | "Somebody's Chelsea" | Reba McEntire |
| 2012 | "First Kiss" | Maggie Sajak |
| 2012 | "Over You" | Miranda Lambert |
| 2012 | "Party 'Til the Cows Come Home" | Rachele Lynae |
| 2012 | "Fastest Girl in Town" | Miranda Lambert |
| 2012 | "The House That Broke Me" | Cledus T. Judd |
| 2012 | "American Heart" | Faith Hill |
| 2013 | "Sure Be Cool If You Did" | Blake Shelton |
| 2013 | "Mama's Broken Heart" | Miranda Lambert |
| 2013 | "Easy" | Sheryl Crow |
| 2013 | "Boys 'Round Here" | Blake Shelton |
| 2013 | "Hush Hush" | Pistol Annies |
| 2013 | "You Can't Make Old Friends" | Kenny Rogers with Dolly Parton |
| 2014 | "Who I Am with You" | Chris Young |
| 2014 | "Automatic" | Miranda Lambert |
| 2014 | "You Belong" | Sandra Lynn |
| 2014 | "Somethin' Bad" | Miranda Lambert with Carrie Underwood |
| 2014 | "When I Woke Up Today" | Wade Bowen |
| 2014 | "Look at You" | Big & Rich |
| 2014 | "Lay Low" | Josh Turner |
| 2015 | "Little Red Wagon" | Miranda Lambert |
| 2015 | "Lovin' Lately" | Big & Rich with Tim McGraw |
| 2015 | "Gravity" | Big & Rich |
| 2015 | "Brand New Buzz" | Big & Rich |
| 2015 | "Sangria" | Blake Shelton |
| 2015 | "Bar Hoppin'" | Sandra Lynn |
| 2015 | "I'm Comin' Over (with David McClister)" | Chris Young |
| 2015 | "Love Is Your Name" | Steven Tyler |
| 2015 | "Burning House" | Cam |
| 2016 | "Hold On" | The Scott Brothers |
| 2016 | "Think of You" | Chris Young & Cassadee Pope |
| 2016 | "Unlove You" | Jennifer Nettles |
| 2016 | "Came Here to Forget" | Blake Shelton |
| 2016 | "Friends" | Blake Shelton |
| 2016 | "Let the Night Shine In" | The Scott Brothers |
| 2016 | "Wanna Be That Song" | Brett Eldredge |
| 2016 | "Vice" | Miranda Lambert |
| 2017 | "We Should Be Friends" | Miranda Lambert |
| 2017 | "Like I Loved You" | Brett Young |
| 2017 | "The Way I Talk" | Morgan Wallen |
| 2018 | "The Ones That Like Me" | Brantley Gilbert |
| 2018 | "Born to Love You" | LANCO |
| 2018 | "Like We Used To" | The McClymonts |
| 2018 | "Come Do a Little Life" | Mo Pitney |
| 2018 | "Keeper of the Flame" | Miranda Lambert |
| 2018 | "How Can I Miss You" | JB and the Moonshine Band |
| 2019 | "Bring My Flowers Now" | Tanya Tucker |
| 2019 | "The Father, My Son, and the Holy Ghost" | Craig Morgan |
| 2020 | "Bluebird" | Miranda Lambert |
| 2020 | "Does to Me" with Jon Small | Luke Combs with Eric Church |
| 2020 | "Settling Down" | Miranda Lambert |
| 2020 | "Tequila Does" | Miranda Lambert |
| 2021 | "If I Was a Cowboy"(version 1) | Miranda Lambert |
| 2022 | "If I Was a Cowboy"(version 2) | Miranda Lambert |
| 2022 | "Strange" | Miranda Lambert |
| 2022 | "Love is a Cowboy" | Kelsea Ballerini |
| 2023 | "World on Fire" | Nate Smith |
| 2024 | "Wranglers" | Miranda Lambert |
