= Jimmy Wayne (album) =

Studio album by Jimmy Wayne
- Released: June 24, 2003
- Genre: Country
- Length: 46:56
- Label: DreamWorks
- Producers: Chris Lindsey; James Stroud

Jimmy Wayne chronology
Jimmy Wayne (2003)	Do You Believe Me Now (2008)

Singles from Jimmy Wayne
- 1. "Stay Gone" Released: January 20, 2003; 2. "I Love You This Much" Released: August 11, 2003; 3. "You Are" Released: March 15, 2004; 4. "Paper Angels" Released: October 25, 2004

Professional ratings
Review scores
Source	Rating
AllMusic	4/5 stars
Entertainment Weekly	B+
Country Standard Time	

Jimmy Wayne is the debut studio album by American country music singer Jimmy Wayne. It was released in the United States on DreamWorks in mid 2003, it produced four chart singles on the Billboard Hot Country Songs charts. The album's first two singles, "Stay Gone" and "I Love You This Much", both reached Top Ten on that chart, peaking at No. 3 and No. 6, respectively. Following these two songs were "You Are" and "Paper Angels", both of which peaked at No. 18. It was also his only album for the DreamWorks label, which was closed in 2006. "Stay Gone" and "I Love You This Much" were both included on Wayne's next solo album Do You Believe Me Now.

== Critical reception ==
Reviewing for AllMusic, critic Thom Jurek wrote of the album "He can write, sing and yeah, for a guy who spent so much of his life living outdoors and in shelters, he's a handsome devil too. But the grain of truth that's in his voice outstrips any image or sonic trappings that may be placed upon him from outside. Keep your ears open; this young man is no flash in the pan." and reviewing for Entertainment Weekly, critic Alanna Nash wrote of the album "Wayne sings with pop-star stylings, but his bruised songs throb with stone-cold truths."

== Track listing ==
No.	Title	Writer(s)	Length
1.	"After You"	Jimmy Wayne; Jill Wood	4:12
2.	"Are You Ever Gonna Love Me"	Marv Green; Chris Lindsey; Aimee Mayo	3:50
3.	"Stay Gone"	Wayne; Billy Kirsch	3:47
4.	"Trespassin'"	Bill Luther; Lindsey; Mayo	4:12
5.	"Paper Angels"	Wayne; Don Sampson	3:48
6.	"You Are"	Wayne; Green; Lindsey; Mayo	4:16
7.	"She Runs"	Phil Barnhart; Kevin Paige; Bob Regan	3:20
8.	"Just a Dream"	Wayne; D. Vincent Williams	3:59
9.	"Blue and Brown"	Wayne; Jeremy Stover	3:23
10.	"I Love You This Much"	Wayne; Sampson; Chris DuBois	4:08
11.	"You're Not the One I'm Talking To"	Jim Collins; Williams	3:48
12.	"The Rabbit"	Wayne; Regan	4:13
Total length:			46:56

== Personnel ==
Compiled from liner notes.

Musicians

- Tim Akers – keyboards, piano
- Tom Bukovac – electric guitar
- Eric Darken – percussion
- Chip Davis – background vocals
- Paul Franklin – steel guitar
- Kenny Greenberg – electric guitar
- Aubrey Haynie – fiddle, mandolin
- Wes Hightower – background vocals
- B. James Lowry – acoustic guitar
- Brent Mason – electric guitar
- Steve Nathan – keyboards, piano
- Jimmie Lee Sloas – bass guitar
- Biff Watson – acoustic guitar
- Jimmy Wayne – lead vocals, acoustic guitar
- Kris Wilkinson – strings
- Lonnie Wilson – drums
- Glenn Worf – bass guitar
- Jonathan Yudkin – fiddle, mandolin

Technical

- Scott Borchetta – executive production
- Ricky Cobble – recording
- Greg Droman – mixing (except "Just a Dream")
- Julian King – recording (all tracks), mixing ("Just a Dream" only)
- Chris Lindsey – production, recording
- Ken Love – mastering
- James Stroud – production
- Hank Williams – mastering

== Chart performance ==
=== Weekly charts ===
Chart (2003)	Peak position
US Billboard 200	64
US Top Country Albums (Billboard)	7

=== Year-end charts ===
Chart (2003)	Position
US Top Country Albums (Billboard)	61
Chart (2004)	Position
US Top Country Albums (Billboard)	52

=== Singles ===
Year	Single	Peak chart positions	
Year	Single	US Country	US
2003	"Stay Gone"	3	32
2003	"I Love You This Much"	6	53
2004	"You Are"	18	108
2004	"Paper Angels"	18	108
