= Takin' Off This Pain =

Single by Ashton Shepherd

from the album Sounds So Good
- Released: September 17, 2007
- Genre: Country
- Length: 3:10
- Label: MCA Nashville
- Songwriter: Ashton Shepherd
- Producer: Buddy Cannon

Ashton Shepherd singles chronology
| "Takin' Off This Pain" (2007) | "Sounds So Good" (2008) |

"Takin' Off This Pain" is a debut song written and recorded by American country music artist Ashton Shepherd. It was released in September 2007 as the first single from her debut album Sounds So Good.

== Critical reception ==
Kevin John Coyne of Country Universe gave the song an A grade, praising Shepherd as "just the kind of fresh blood country music needs." In his review of the album, Engine 145 reviewer Matt C. wrote "you can 'hear' the sneer on her face as she navigates a song that’s angry yet smart and brash yet self-aware."

== Music video ==
Two music videos were filmed for the song. The first was directed by Shaun Silva and premiered in November 2007. A second video, directed by Danny Clinch and Becky Fluke, premiered in March 2008.

== Chart performance ==
The song debuted at number 51 on the U.S. Billboard Hot Country Songs chart for the week of October 20, 2007.

| Chart (2007–2008) | Peak position |
|---|---|
| US Hot Country Songs (Billboard) | 20 |
| US Billboard Bubbling Under Hot 100 | 16 |
