= You Are (Jimmy Wayne song) =

Single by Jimmy Wayne

from the album Jimmy Wayne
- Released: March 15, 2004
- Genre: Country
- Length: 4:16
- Label: DreamWorks
- Songwriters: Jimmy Wayne; Marv Green; Aimee Mayo; Chris Lindsey
- Producers: Chris Lindsey; James Stroud

Jimmy Wayne singles chronology
"I Love You This Much" (2003)	"You Are" (2004)	"Paper Angels" (2004)

"You Are" is a song co-written and recorded by American country music artist Jimmy Wayne. It was released in 2004 as the third single from the album Jimmy Wayne. The song reached #18 on the Billboard Hot Country Singles & Tracks chart. The song was written by Wayne, Marv Green, Aimee Mayo, and Chris Lindsey.

== Chart performance ==
Chart (2004)	Peak position
US Hot Country Songs (Billboard)	18
US Billboard Bubbling Under Hot 100	8
