= Sounds So Good (song) =

Single by Ashton Shepherd

from the album Sounds So Good
- Released: May 19, 2008
- Genre: Country
- Length: 3:27
- Label: MCA Nashville
- Songwriter: Ashton Shepherd
- Producer: Buddy Cannon

Ashton Shepherd singles chronology
"Takin' Off This Pain" (2007)	"Sounds So Good" (2008)	"Look It Up" (2011)

"Sounds So Good" is a song written and recorded by American country music artist Ashton Shepherd. It was released in May 2008 as the second single and title track from her debut album Sounds So Good.

== Critical reception ==
Leeann Ward of Country Universe gave the song an A− grade, calling it "a more mainstream sounding song that relies more heavily on strong melody than lyrical strength." Matt C. of Engine 145 gave the song a "thumbs up," writing that "Shepherd lovingly sings her life’s soundtrack in a voice imbued with honest, lived experiences" and "her Alabama drawl makes every bent syllable even easier to believe."

== Music video ==
The music video was directed by Roman White and premiered in June 2008.

== Chart performance ==
The song debuted at number 56 on the U.S. Billboard Hot Country Songs chart for the week of May 31, 2008.

Chart (2008)	Peak position
US Hot Country Songs (Billboard)	21
US Billboard Bubbling Under Hot 100	16
