= Where Country Grows =

Studio album by Ashton Shepherd
- Released: July 12, 2011
- Genre: Country
- Length: 35:11 (standard edition); 48:29 (deluxe edition)
- Label: MCA Nashville
- Producer: Buddy Cannon

Ashton Shepherd chronology
Sounds So Good (2008)	Where Country Grows (2011)	This Is America (2013)

Singles from Where Country Grows
- 1. "Look It Up" Released: January 3, 2011; 2. "Where Country Grows" Released: July 11, 2011

Where Country Grows is the second studio album by American country music artist Ashton Shepherd. It was released on July 12, 2011 via MCA Nashville. The album's first single, "Look It Up" reached the Top 20 on the Billboard Hot Country Songs chart. The title track was released as the album's second single in July 2011.

== Critical reception ==
Professional ratings
Review scores
Source	Rating
AllMusic	4.5/5 stars
Boston Globe	Positive
Country Weekly	3.5/5 stars
The New York Times	Positive
Rolling Stone	4/5 stars

Where Country Grows received positive reviews from music critics. Jessica Phillips of Country Weekly gave the album 3 and 1/2 stars out of 5, complimenting her songwriting and personality, while drawing comparisons to fellow country artists Miranda Lambert and Sunny Sweeney. She also stated that "Ashton's twangy songs are fearless, introspective and unabashedly country, which just might peg her as a new Loretta Lynn." In his review for AllMusic, Stephen Thomas Erlewine referred to Shepherd as "a powerhouse singer that there's never a relaxed moment on the record." He also went on to compliment the set as "mak[ing] considerable effort to brighten and broaden her sound, to bring in listeners who may not have been seduced by the late-night vibes of Sounds So Good." Jody Rosen of Rolling Stone gave the album 4 stars out of 5, favoring Shepherd's voice, which she found "perfect for her wise, witty, tough-minded songs." Boston Globe reviewed the album positively as "merg[ing] her deep-country style with a contemporary country sound, setting a modern groove to her rural Alabama persona," while highlighting the song "I'm Good" as ranking among country classics by Tammy Wynette and Reba McEntire. The New York Times favorably describing the record's biggest strength in Shepherd's accented vocals, and considered her vocal control a "real weapon."

== Track listing ==
No.	Title	Writer(s)	Length
1.	"Look It Up" (edit)	Robert Ellis Orrall; Angaleena Presley	2:59
2.	"I'm Good"	Ashton Shepherd; Dean Dillon; Dale Dodson	3:25
3.	"Where Country Grows"	A. Shepherd; Bobby Pinson	3:12
4.	"I'm Just a Woman"	A. Shepherd	4:38
5.	"More Cows Than People"	A. Shepherd; Pinson	2:41
6.	"Beer On a Boat"	Rhett Akins; Marv Green; Ben Hayslip	3:06
7.	"While It Ain't Rainin'"	A. Shepherd; Troy Jones	4:10
8.	"Tryin' to Go to Church"	A. Shepherd; Brandy Clark; Shane McAnally	3:20
9.	"That All Leads to One Thing"	A. Shepherd	4:01
10.	"Rory's Radio"	A. Shepherd	3:39
Total length:			35:11

Deluxe edition bonus tracks
No.	Title	Writer(s)	Length
11.	"Look It Up"	Orrall; Presley	2:59
12.	"One Summer Gone"	A. Shepherd; Tara Shepherd	3:40
13.	"Keepin' It Rural"	Dallas Davidson; Hayslip; Jimmy Yeary	3:01
14.	"What If It Was"	A. Shepherd	3:38
Total length:			48:29

== Personnel ==
- Wyatt Beard – background vocals
- Mark Beckett – drums
- Jim "Moose" Brown – Hammond B-3 organ, piano, Wurlitzer
- Pat Buchanan – electric guitar
- Melonie Cannon – background vocals
- J.T. Corenflos – electric guitar
- Dan Dugmore – steel guitar
- Kevin "Swine" Grantt – bass guitar
- Tony Creasman – drums, percussion
- Kenny Greenberg – baritone guitar
- Rob Hajacos – fiddle
- John Hobbs – Hammond B-3 organ, piano, Wurlitzer
- Mike Johnson – steel guitar
- Randy McCormick – clavinet, Hammond B-3 organ, piano, synthesizer
- Mickey Raphael – harmonica
- John Wesley Ryles – background vocals
- Ashton Shepherd – lead vocals
- Joe Spivey – fiddle
- Bobby Terry – acoustic guitar
- Scott Vestal – banjo
- Billy Joe Walker Jr. – acoustic guitar

== Chart performance ==
=== Album ===
Chart (2011)	Peak position
US Billboard 200	37
US Billboard Top Country Albums	11

=== Singles ===
Year	Single	Peak chart positions	
Year	Single	US Country	US
2011	"Look It Up"	19	95
2011	"Where Country Grows"	42	—
"—" denotes releases that did not chart
