= Look It Up (album) =

Studio album by Jasmine Rae
- Released: September 6, 2008
- Recorded: 2008
- Genre: Country
- Length: 34:39
- Label: ABC
- Producer: Mark Moffatt & Richard Landis

Jasmine Rae chronology
| Look It Up (2008) | Listen Here (2011) |

Look It Up is the debut studio album by Australian country music singer Jasmine Rae. The album was released on 6 September 2008 and debuted and peaked at number 62 on the ARIA Charts.

At the ARIA Music Awards of 2009, the album was nominated for Best Country Album.

== Background and release ==
Jasmine Rae first caught the attention of the Australian music scene in 2008, when she won the prestigious Telstra Road to Discovery competition. Shortly after winning the competition, Rae signed a recording deal with ABC Music and was invited to perform at the CMA Music Festival in Nashville USA. Rae released her debut single "Country Singer" which peaked at #1 on the Australian Country Singles and Music Video Charts. Her debut studio album Look It Up was released in September 2008.

== Track listing ==
| No. | Title | Length |
|---|---|---|
| 1. | "Pink Guitar" | 2:35 |
| 2. | "Look It Up" | 3:03 |
| 3. | "Unbelievable" | 3:32 |
| 4. | "Can't a Girl Change Her Mind" | 3:17 |
| 5. | "Country Singer" | 3:20 |
| 6. | "Did I Just Say That?" | 2:44 |
| 7. | "My Own Thing" | 3:28 |
| 8. | "Heart on Ice" | 2:57 |
| 9. | "The Red Dress" | 3:12 |
| 10. | "As Far as You Know" | 2:56 |
| 11. | "Ain't the Same Girl" | 3:35 |

Deluxe Edition
| No. | Title | Length |
|---|---|---|
| 12. | "All You Really Need" (bonus track) | 3:26 |
| 13. | "Look It Up" (stripped bare) | 2:54 |
| 14. | "Lucky" (stripped bare) | 3:01 |
| 15. | "Heart on Ice" (stripped bare) | 2:37 |
| 16. | "Top of the World" (stripped bare) | 5:22 |
| 17. | "Get Out" (bonus track) | 2:58 |

Deluxe Edition DVD
| No. | Title | Length |
|---|---|---|
| 1. | "Pink Guitar" (music video) |
| 2. | "Look It Up" (music video) |
| 3. | "Country Singer" (music video) |
| 4. | "Can't a Girl Change Her Mind" (music video) |
| 5. | "Bring Me Some Water" (live) |
| 6. | "The Red Dress" (live) |
| 7. | "Jasmine Rae - The Journey" |

== Charts ==
=== Weekly charts ===
| Chart (2008) | Peak position |
|---|---|
| Australian Albums (ARIA) | 62 |
| Australian Country Albums (ARIA) | 5 |

=== Year-end charts ===
| Chart (2008) | Position |
|---|---|
| Australian Country Albums (ARIA) | 49 |

== Release history ==
| Region | Date | Format | Edition(s) | Label | Catalogue |
|---|---|---|---|---|---|
| Australia | 6 September 2008 | CD; DD | Standard | ABC Music | 1780332 |
| Australia | 23 January 2010 | DD | Deluxe Edition | ABC Music | |
| Australia | 5 February 2010 | CD/DVD | CD/DVD Edition | ABC Music | 2701783 |
