= Jasmine Rae =

Australian singer and songwriter

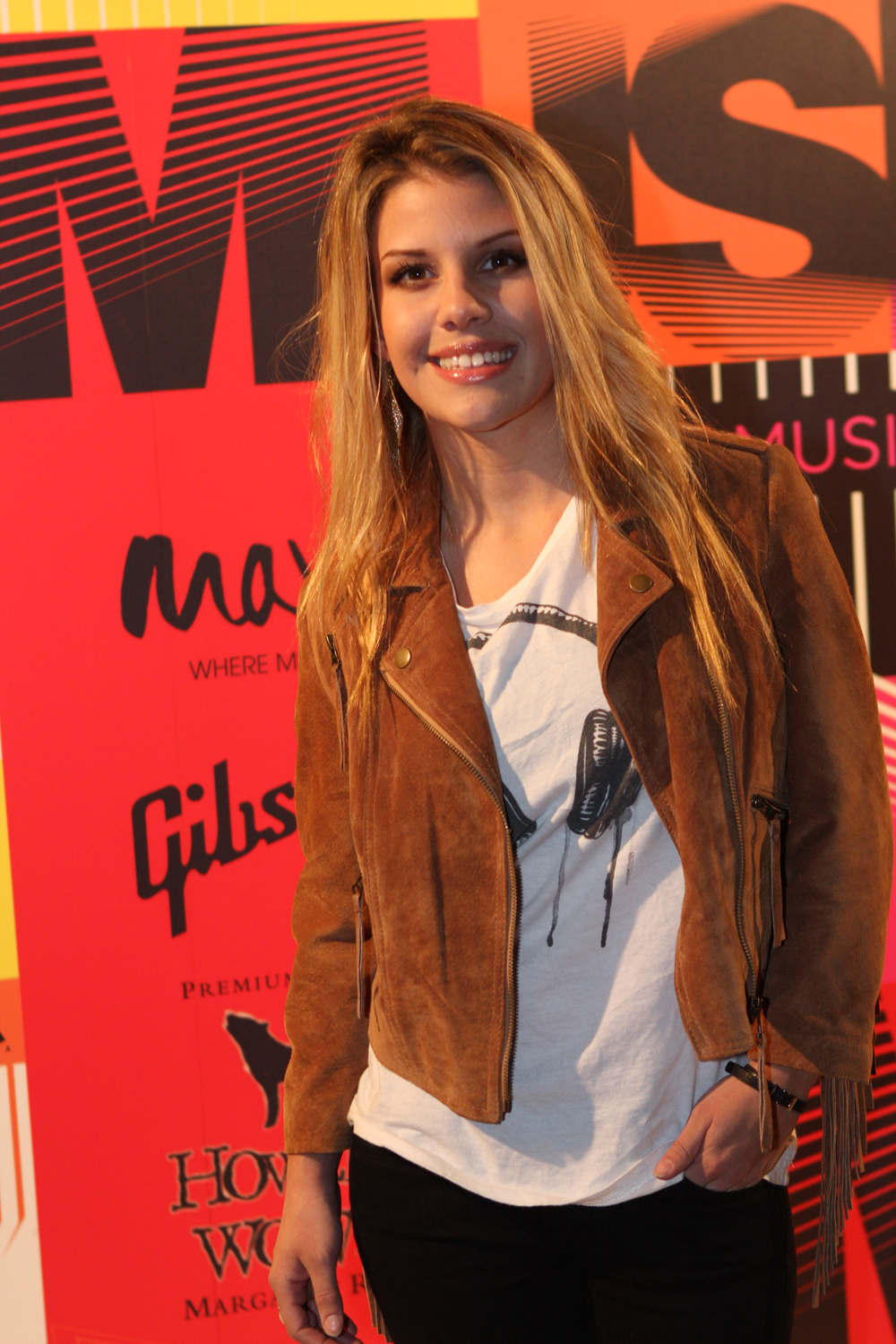
- Jasmine Rae in 2012

Background information
- Born: October 28, 1987 (age 39); Melbourne, Australia
- Origin: Melbourne, Victoria, Australia
- Genres: Country, blues, soul
- Occupation: Singer-songwriter
- Instruments: Vocals, guitar, harmonica, piano
- Years active: 2008–present
- Label: ABC Music
- Website: www.jasminerae.com

Jasmine Rae performing "Heartbeat".

Jasmine Rae is an Australian singer and songwriter who has released five studio albums via ABC Music Australia. Rae has been nominated for four ARIA Music Awards and has won two CMC Music Awards, and received the 'Global Artist of the Year' award by the US Country Music Association in 2013. She is also an eleven-time Golden Guitar nominee.

== Biography ==
=== 2008–2010: Telstra Road to Tamworth and Look It Up ===
In 2008, Rae auditioned for and won the Telstra Road to Tamworth. Her prize was a recording contract with ABC Music and a performance at the 2008 CMA music festival in Nashville.

Rae recorded and release her debut studio album Look It Up in September 2008. The title track, "Look It Up" was later covered by American country artist Ashton Shepherd, which become a Top 20 hit on the U.S. Billboard Hot Country Songs chart.

In 2009, Rae toured with Brooks & Dunn.

=== 2011–2012: Listen Here ===
In March 2011, Rae released her second studio album Listen Here. The album debuted at No. 1 on the ARIA Australian Artists Country Chart and No. 35 on the ARIA Albums Chart. Two singles "Hunky Country Boys" and "I'll Try Anything" topped the Australian Country airplay charts. Those songs plus "I Faked It" also went to No. 1 on the CMC Music Video chart. The album was nominated for the ARIA Award for Best Country Album. Jasmine was also a Golden Guitar nominee for Female Artist of the Year at the Australian Country Music Awards the following January.

In 2012 Australian Music fans voted Jasmine Rae, CMC OZ Artist of the Year. She remains the only female solo artist to ever win the award. In November 2012, Rae released a Christmas EP titled Santa's Little Helper.

In 2013 she received a CMA Award (US) for Global Artist of the Year

=== 2013–2014: If I Want To ===
In August 2013, Rae released her third studio album If I Want To; the title track shot straight to the top of the CMC Top 30 Countdown chart and held strong for four weeks. The track also topped the Australian Country Radio charts. If I Want To was nominated for ARIA Award for Best Country Album. and four Golden Guitar Awards at the 2014 CMA Awards; for Album of the Year, Top Selling Album of the Year, Single of the Year and Female Artist of the Year.

In March 2014, Jasmine Rae won her second CMC Music Award for 'Female Oz Artist of the Year.' Rae featured on Adam Brand's song "Quit This Time" from Brand's album My Side of the Street which was released in August 2014.

=== 2015–2019: Heartbeat ===
Rae released her fourth album, titled Heartbeat through ABC Music / Universal Music Australia on 15 May 2015. The single "Heartbeat" became her ninth number-one Australian country single and "When I Found You": – a song she originally wrote for her best friends wedding has been viewed more than 10 million times on YouTube. "Everybody Wants to Take My Money" was a finalist in the 2016 International Songwriting Competition.

Heartbeat was nominated for two Golden Guitar awards in 2016 and Jasmine was again nominated for CMC 'Female Oz Artist of the Year' in 2016 and 2017. Like If I Want To, the album was produced by Luke Wooten.

In 2018, Jasmine toured with US country singer Granger Smith and began writing for a new album.

In 2019, Jasmine released the singles "Right Now" and "Party on the Couch"—her first official music video in over two and a half years.

Jasmine has also been announced as an artist on the 2020 CMC Rocks QLD line-up.

=== 2020–present: Lion Side ===
In 2020, Rae appeared as a featured artist on Jayne Denham's single "Porch Party", alongside Amber Lawrence.

In 2020, Jasmine released the singles "Green Light" and "Don't Do It for the Haters," plus the album Lion Side. The album was nominated for the ARIA Award for Best Country Album and the album peaked at #11 on the ARIA Albums chart, #2 on the AIR Independent Albums chart and #1 on the ARIA Australian Country Albums chart. Jasmine was also nominated for 'Female Artist of the Year' and 'Contemporary Country Album of the Year' at the 2021 Golden Guitar Awards.

== Discography ==
=== Albums ===
Title	Details	Peak positions	
Title	Details	AUS	AUS Country
Look It Up	Release date: 6 September 2008; Label: ABC Music (1780332); Formats: CD	62	5
Listen Here	Release date: 4 March 2011; Label: ABC Music (2762279); Formats: CD, Download	35	2
If I Want To	Release date: 2 August 2013; Label: ABC Music (3741975); Formats: CD, Download	23	2
Heartbeat	Release date: 15 May 2015; Label: ABC Music (4722644); Formats: CD, Download	41	3
Lion Side	Release date: 24 July 2020; Label: ABC Music (0887177); Formats: CD, download, streaming	11	2

=== Extended play ===
Title	Details
Santa's Little Helper	Release date: 16 November 2012; Label: ABC Music (3723217); Formats: CD, download

== Awards ==
=== ARIA Music Awards ===
The ARIA Music Awards are a set of annual ceremonies presented by Australian Recording Industry Association (ARIA), which recognise excellence, innovation, and achievement across all genres of the music of Australia. They commenced in 1987. Rae has been nominated for four ARIA Music Awards, all in the category Best Country Album.

Year	Nominee / work	Award	Result
2009	Look it Up	Best Country Album	Nominated
2011	Listen Here	Best Country Album	Nominated
2013	If I Want to	Best Country Album	Nominated
2020	Lion Side	Best Country Album	Nominated

=== CMC Music Awards ===
Rae has Won two CMC Music Awards and been a finalist 4 other times.

Year	Award	Result
2012	CMC Oz Artist of the Year	Won
2014	CMC Female Oz Artist of the Year	Won
2014	CMC Australian Music Video of the Year ('If I Want To')	Nominated
2015	CMC Female Oz Artist of the Year	Nominated
2016	CMC Female Oz Artist of the Year	Nominated
2017	CMC Australian Female Artist of the Year	Nominated

=== CMA Awards (US) ===
The Jeff Walker Global Country Artist Award recognises outstanding achievements by a country music artist originally signed outside of the United States – in both furthering the popularity of Country Music and bringing attention to the Country Music format in their foreign-based territory.

Year	Award	Result
2013	CMA Global Artist of the Year	Won
