= When I Found You (Jasmine Rae song) =

Single by Jasmine Rae

from the album Heartbeat
- Released: 2015
- Genre: Country
- Length: 4:10
- Label: ABC
- Songwriter(s): Jasmine Rae, Sean Carey, Beau Golden

Jasmine Rae singles chronology
| "Heartbeat" (2015) | "When I Found You" (2015) | "Everybody Wants to Take My Money" (2017) |

Music video
- "When I Found You" on YouTube

"When I Found You" is a song recorded by Australian country music artist Jasmine Rae. It was co-written by Rae, Sean Carey, and Beau Golden. The song was released in 2015 as the second single from her album Heartbeat.

== Content ==
"When I Found You" is a country ballad in the key of D major with a 3/4 time signature. Lyrically, the song discusses themes of marriage and ageing and the dependence of one another. According to Rae, the song was written for the wedding of her childhood friend Amber.

== Chart performance ==
| Chart | Peak position |
|---|---|
| Australian Country Airplay | 1 |

== Lawsuit ==
On 10 January 2018, Golden and Carey launched a lawsuit alleging plagiarism by country music song "The Rest of Our Life", performed by Tim McGraw and Faith Hill, and co-written by Ed Sheeran, Amy Wadge, Johnny McDaid and Steve Mac. The lawsuit asks for an injunction, at least $5 million in damages, royalties and attorney fees. Golden and Carey allege that Rae is not a party in the case as her boyfriend is a marketing manager for Sony Music, and was involved in the release of "The Rest of Our Life".

Rae has since stated, “Essentially, I don’t agree with the way they have chosen to address the whole issue. They’ve been encouraged to immediately assume the worst and seem to be trying to create ways to involve people who had nothing to do with the writing of the song as well, in order to try and get more money and publicity from the situation, no matter what the impact is on anyone else."
