= Do You Believe Me Now (Jimmy Wayne song) =

Single by Jimmy Wayne

from the album Do You Believe Me Now
- B-side: "Stronger Woman" (Jewel)
- Released: March 31, 2008
- Genre: Country rock
- Length: 3:25
- Label: Valory Music Group
- Songwriters: Tim Johnson; Joe West; Dave Pahanish
- Producers: Joe West; Dave Pahanish

Jimmy Wayne singles chronology
"I'll Never Leave You" (2007)	"Do You Believe Me Now" (2008)	"I Will" (2008)

Music video
- "Do You Believe Me Now" at CMT.com

"Do You Believe Me Now" is a song written by Tim Johnson, Joe West and Dave Pahanish, and recorded by American country music singer Jimmy Wayne. It was released in March 2008 as the first single and title track from his album of the same name, which was released on August 26, 2008. His first Top 40 single on the country charts since "Paper Angels" in late 2004-early 2005, it is the third single of his career to reach the Top Ten on the Billboard Hot Country Songs chart, as well as his first and only number one.

== Content ==
The song is a mid-tempo centralizing on the male narrator, who is speaking to a former lover. In the first verse, he tells her that he "didn't like the way" that another man was looking at her, to which she responds by saying that it was only the narrator's imagination. In the chorus, the narrator then asks the female if she believes him now, as it turns out his suspicions were correct and she is now with that other man. The second verse then finds the narrator feeling sorry for himself because he gave the other male a chance to take her away from him. In the bridge, the narrator is unable to find solace in this knowledge, as he says, "what's the use in being right when I'm the lonely one tonight?"

According to Country Weekly, songwriter Tim Johnson was encouraged to write the song after his friend was with another girl. He got together with friends Dave Pahanish and Joe West to write the song, and it was finished after about a month. They played the song for Wayne, who liked the song and decided to record it.

== Music video ==
The music video for this song was directed by Deaton-Flanigen Productions, and begins with Wayne filming a woman's birthday party. It then zooms out to reveal Wayne watching the party on TV himself. The camera follows the woman around and reveals that it is Wayne's lover when they kiss. The camera then keeps filming as another man walks into the scene and starts talking to her. Later, the man again approaches her and makes her laugh, right as Wayne turns the camera on them. He puts the camera down in disappointment. Each time the woman and her new lover are in a scene, Wayne pauses the film and watches in silence. Scenes also feature him playing guitar on a stairwell and standing against a large window.

== Chart performance ==
"Do You Believe Me Now" reached Number One on the Hot Country Songs chart for the week of September 13, 2008, marking not only Wayne's first number-one hit, but the first for the Valory Music Group imprint. It also became Wayne's second single to peak in the top 40 on the Billboard Hot 100 at number 36, and it was also his first top 40 hit on that chart since "Paper Angels". On the country singles chart dated for September 20, "Do You Believe Me Now" fell to number two, when Brad Paisley's "Waitin' on a Woman" took over the top spot. One week later, "Do You Believe Me Now" returned to Number One for a second and final week. In May 2009, the song debuted on the Hot Adult Contemporary Tracks chart, peaking at #29 after one week.

Chart (2008)	Peak position
Canada Hot 100 (Billboard)	64
US Billboard Hot 100	36
US Adult Contemporary (Billboard)	29
US Hot Country Songs (Billboard)	1

=== Year-end charts ===
Chart (2008)	Position
U.S. Billboard Hot Country Songs	13
