= Dave Pahanish =

American singer-songwriter

- Born: David Pahanish
- Genres: Country
- Occupation: Singer-songwriter

David Pahanish (/pəˈhænɪʃ/ pə-HAN-ish) is an American singer-songwriter. He co-wrote the No. 1 Billboard country music singles "Do You Believe Me Now" by Jimmy Wayne, "American Ride" by Toby Keith, and "Without You" by Keith Urban. Pahanish has also had songs recorded by Tim McGraw, Jimmy Wayne, Collin Raye, and others.

== Life and career ==
A native of southwestern Pennsylvania, Pahanish lived in Rices Landing in Greene County, as well as South Park and Peters Township. He attended Waynesburg University. Pahanish regularly performed folk rock on the stages of Pittsburgh for over 15 years. His songs appeared in television series and he collaborated with Nashville-based songwriter Michael Garvin.

Pahanish relocated from California, Pennsylvania to Nashville in late 2006. Within weeks, he was offered three music publishing deals, and signed with 3 River Publishing, owned by songwriters Hillary Lindsey, Dallas Davidson, and Cole Wright. He co-wrote and co-produced with Joe West the Jimmy Wayne album "Do You Believe Me Now" yielding the Top 40 Billboard Hot Country Songs charting singles, "Do You Believe Me Now", and "I Will", by Jimmy Wayne.

Pahanish co-wrote the single, "Without You", with Joe West, recorded by Keith Urban on his 2010 album, Get Closer. Urban chose the song because of how closely the lyrics and message fit in with his own life, stating: "it's the most autobiographical song I never wrote." Pahanish wrote the song after meeting his wife's family for the first time, without realizing any similarities to Urban's life. The song became Urban's 12th No. 1 single and Pahanish and West's third No. 1 song.

Two of Pahanish's songs were recorded by Tim McGraw for his 2012 album, Emotional Traffic.

Pahanish is the father of four girls and the grandfather to one girl.
