= I Love You This Much =

Single by Jimmy Wayne

from the album Jimmy Wayne
- B-side: "Paper Angels"
- Released: August 11, 2003
- Genre: Country
- Length: 4:08
- Label: DreamWorks Nashville
- Songwriters: Jimmy Wayne; Chris DuBois; Don Sampson
- Producers: Chris Lindsey; James Stroud

Jimmy Wayne singles chronology
"Stay Gone" (2003)	"I Love You This Much" (2003)	"You Are" (2004)

"I Love You This Much" is a song co-written and recorded by American country music artist Jimmy Wayne. It was released in August 2003 as the second single from his self-titled album, reaching a peak of #6 on the U.S. country charts and #53 on the Billboard Hot 100. The song was written by Wayne, Don Sampson and Chris DuBois.

== Content ==
The song is a ballad that tells of a young man's attempts to express his love to his father, despite the father's constant distance from his son. Later, the man grows to hate his father for being so unresponsive, eventually cursing his father upon the father's death. Later, at the funeral service for his father, the man sees an image of Jesus on the cross; this image then reminds the man that he "hadn't been unloved or alone all his life".

== Music video ==
A music video was released for the song, directed by Trey Fanjoy. The video follows the song's lyrics, beginning with a little boy standing in the yard as his father drives up. Then, the video shifts to a funeral, where Wayne is shown singing while he stands beside the casket.

== Chart performance ==
The song debuted at 53 on the Hot Country Singles & Tracks tracks chart dated August 23, 2003.

Chart (2003–2004)	Peak position
US Billboard Hot 100	53
US Hot Country Songs (Billboard)	6

=== Year-end charts ===
Chart (2004)	Position
US Country Songs (Billboard)	42
