= Sounds So Good =

Studio album by Ashton Shepherd
- Released: March 4, 2008
- Genre: Country
- Length: 40:43
- Label: MCA Nashville
- Producer: Buddy Cannon

Ashton Shepherd chronology
Sounds So Good (2008)	Where Country Grows (2011)

Singles from Sounds So Good
- 1. "Takin' Off This Pain" Released: September 17, 2007; 2. "Sounds So Good" Released: May 19, 2008

Sounds So Good is the debut studio album by American country music artist Ashton Shepherd. The album was released on March 4, 2008, via MCA Nashville Records. The album has produced two singles: "Takin' Off This Pain", which reached number 20 on Billboard Hot Country Songs, and the title track, which reached number 21. Shepherd wrote or co-wrote all but one of the tracks.

== Critical reception ==
Professional ratings
Review scores
Source	Rating
AllMusic	4/5 stars
Engine 145	4/5 stars
Entertainment Weekly	B+
Slant Magazine	3.5/5 stars

AllMusic's Stephen Thomas Erlewine gave note of the album's "crawling midtempo numbers" giving "a slight meditative quality" to the overall record, concluding that: "As good as these lighter numbers are, Shepherd's gifts are her intimacy as a writer and how her powerful voice lends depth to her songs. Both qualities shine brightly on this compelling debut." Matt C of Engine 145 praised Buddy Cannon's production for being "undeniably traditional yet surprisingly not far afield from pop-country radio polish" and Shepherd's songwriting and vocals elevating even the album's lesser tracks ("Lost in You", "How Big Are Angel Wings"), concluding that: "It's not a statement for traditional country music, and it's not devoid of Nashville tricks and polish. Rather, it's an album by a woman who's from the country and is singing what she knows about, and it Sounds So Good." Entertainment Weekly writer Chris Willman called Sounds So Good "the best mainstream country debut" since Taylor Swift's debut in 2006, saying the tracks "nicely split the difference between radio-friendliness and pure country tradition." Jonathan Keefe of Slant Magazine felt it was "among the most significant debuts" to come out of Nashville, praising Shepherd's songwriting for carrying "a remarkably self-assured, unique point of view" in the various stories and Cannon's production for elevating the album's "handful of weaker cuts" with "a polished take on traditional country", concluding that: "Shepherd's is undoubtedly an important, vital new voice in country music because it is definitively, believably her own." Country Standard Time critic Jessica Phillips praised Shepherd's straightforward lyricism and "beyond-her-years vocals" being similar to Jennifer Nettles and Loretta Lynn, concluding that: "While the record could benefit from more songs like "Pain," and "Pickin' Shed," for those looking for a true country sound, Shepherd's first effort sounds so good."

== Track listing ==
All tracks are written by Ashton Shepherd, except 6, 9, and 10 (Shepherd, Adam Cunningham), and 11 (Cunningham).

No.	Title	Length
1.	"Takin' Off This Pain"	3:09
2.	"I Ain't Dead Yet"	3:13
3.	"Sounds So Good"	3:27
4.	"Not Right Now"	3:37
5.	"Lost in You"	4:13
6.	"Old Memory"	4:20
7.	"The Pickin' Shed"	3:42
8.	"Regular Joe"	4:01
9.	"How Big Are Angel Wings"	4:05
10.	"The Bigger the Heart"	2:34
11.	"Whiskey Won the Battle"	4:20

== Chart performance ==
=== Album ===
The album debuted and peaked at number 16 on the Top Country Albums chart, and number 90 on the Billboard 200 selling less than 10,000 copies in the United States.

Chart (2008)	Peak position
U.S. Billboard Top Country Albums	16
U.S. Billboard 200	90

=== Singles ===
Year	Single	Peak chart positions	
Year	Single	US Country	US
2007	"Takin' Off This Pain"	20	116
2008	"Sounds So Good"	21	116

== Personnel ==
- Wyatt Beard – background vocals
- Buddy Cannon – acoustic guitar, background vocals
- Chad Cromwell – drums
- Dan Dugmore – steel guitar
- Kevin "Swine" Grantt – bass guitar
- Kenny Greenberg – electric guitar
- John Jorgenson – electric guitar
- Shelby Kennedy – background vocals
- B. James Lowry – acoustic guitar, 12-string guitar
- Randy McCormick – piano, Hammond organ, Wurlitzer electric piano, synthesizer
- Larry Paxton – bass guitar
- Gary Prim – piano
- John Wesley Ryles – background vocals
- Scotty Sanders - steel guitar
- Ashton Shepherd - lead vocals
- Joe Spivey - fiddle, mandolin
- Scott Vestal - banjo
- Chip Young – acoustic guitar
