= Heartbeat (Jasmine Rae album) =

Studio album by Jasmine Rae
- Released: 15 May 2015
- Genre: Country
- Label: ABC
- Producer: Luke Wooten

Jasmine Rae chronology
If I Want To (2013)	Heartbeat (2015)

Heartbeat is the fourth studio album by Australian country music singer Jasmine Rae. The album was released on 5 May 2015. The album includes the singles "Heartbeat" and "When I Found You", both of which charted on the Australian Country Airplay charts. "Eggs in a Basket" was released in 2016 and "Everybody Wants to Take My Money" was released as the album's third single in 2017.

== Reception ==
Professional ratings
Review scores
Source	Rating
Renowned for Sound	4/5 stars
The AU Review	9.3/10

Jamie Parmenter from Renowned for Sound commented on the "different qualities to the record" which are "all wrapped neatly in a country bow". Parmenter said "Having penned 10 out of the 12 tracks... [Rae has] created a well-structured and meaningful record". Mallory Arbour from The AU Review said "Heartbeat showcases Jasmine's stunning vocals and versatility as an artist, which makes her a force to be reckoned with in the industry and one to watch out for in the future." adding "It's an honest album that is guaranteed to please fans and gain her many more. I'm a big believer that there is no such thing as perfection, but it comes pretty damn close!"

== Track listing ==
No.	Title	Length
1.	"Everybody Wants To Take My Money"	2:50
2.	"Heartbeat"	3:13
3.	"When I Found You"	4:09
4.	"Don't I Wish It Was"	2:59
5.	"This Is Who I Am In Love"	2:51
6.	"Hold My Hand"	4:19
7.	"Zombie Love"	3:05
8.	"Eggs In A Basket"	3:08
9.	"Lose You All Over Again"	3:54
10.	"Quit This Time (Featuring Adam Brand)"	3:33
11.	"We Don't Know Any Other Way"	3:02
12.	"Fly Away"	3:33

== Charts ==
=== Weekly charts ===
Chart (2015)	Peak position
Australian Albums (ARIA)	41
Australian Country Albums (ARIA)	3

=== Year-end charts ===
Chart (2015)	Peak position
Australian Country Albums (ARIA)	93

== Release history ==
Region	Date	Format	Edition(s)	Label	Catalogue
Australia	15 May 2015	CD; DD	Standard	ABC Music	4722644
