= Listen Here (Jasmine Rae album) =

Studio album by Jasmine Rae
- Released: 4 March 2011
- Recorded: Nashville
- Genre: Country
- Length: 43:34
- Label: ABC
- Producer: Mark Moffatt

Jasmine Rae chronology
Look It Up (2008)	Listen Here (2011)	Santa's Little Helper (2012)

Listen Here is the second studio album by Australian country music singer Jasmine Rae. The album was released on 4 March 2011 and peaked at number 35 on the ARIA Charts.

At the ARIA Music Awards of 2011, the album was nominated for Best Country Album.

== Background and release ==
Listen Here was announced in December 2010 with the release of its lead single, "Hunky Country Boys".

== Track listing ==
No.	Title	Length
1.	"Hunky Country Boys"	3:29
2.	"I Hate That"	3:37
3.	"Fixer Upper"	2:44
4.	"I'll Try Anything" (featuring Joe Nichols)	4:01
5.	"Too Much"	3:49
6.	"I Faked It"	3:05
7.	"When I Say No"	3:22
8.	"If Your Love Was a Rock"	2:50
9.	"Sure Thing"	3:58
10.	"Want Me"	3:23
11.	"I Don't Wanna Talk About It"	3:06
12.	"Miss Hyde"	3:32
13.	"Let It Be Me"	3:40

== Charts ==
=== Weekly charts ===
Chart (2011)	Peak position
Australian Albums (ARIA)	35
Australian Country Albums (ARIA)	2

=== Year-end charts ===
Chart (2011)	Peak position
Australian Country Albums (ARIA)	45

== Release history ==
Region	Date	Format	Edition(s)	Label	Catalogue
Australia	4 March 2011	CD; DD	Standard	ABC Music	2762279
