= I Will (Jimmy Wayne song) =

Single by Jimmy Wayne

from the album Do You Believe Me Now
- Released: October 6, 2008
- Genre: Country
- Length: 3:57 (album version); 3:20 (radio edit)
- Label: Valory Music Group
- Songwriters: Rory Feek; Dave Pahanish
- Producers: Dave Pahanish; Joe West

Jimmy Wayne singles chronology
"Do You Believe Me Now" (2008)	"I Will" (2008)	"I'll Be That" (2009)

Music video
- "I Will" at CMT.com

"I Will" is a song written by Dave Pahanish and Rory Feek, and recorded by American country music artist Jimmy Wayne. It was released in October 2008 as the second single from Wayne's album Do You Believe Me Now, his sixth Top 40 country hit, and his eighth overall single release.

== Content ==
"I Will" is a mid-tempo power ballad mostly accompanied by piano and electric guitar, with more of a country pop sound. Its lyrics show a man who wants to show his lover that he loves her, and that he is willing to do anything for her.

The radio edit shortens the intro, and omits the final chorus.

== Critical reception ==
Brady Vercher of Engine 145 gave the song a "thumbs down" review. Vercher criticized the song for being overproduced and not sounding country. He also considered Wayne's vocals "hyper-excitable" and said that the lyric "hardly offers anything and comes across as too melodramatic in the process." It was given a C− rating by Country Universe critic Blake Boldt, who criticized the production as well, calling it an "overanxious rush to go nowhere." He also thought that Wayne's voice sounded strained on the song.

Deborah Evans Price of Billboard gave the song a more favorable review, saying "the lyric is a beautiful statement of love and devotion that provides an ideal showcase for Wayne's soulful vocals." "I Will" was also described favorably by Country Standard Time critic Jessica Phillips, who called it "soaring" and "heartfelt."

== Music video ==
A music video was filmed for the song in November 2008. Directed by Deaton-Flanigen Productions, it begins with Wayne and a woman (played by Tiffani McCarter) walking out towards a taxi, and they hug before she leaves. She then walks into a studio, where she is preparing for a photo shoot. However, the photographer is not satisfied with her poses. Eventually, after having had enough of the photographer's frustration, Wayne's girlfriend leaves to call him and tell him that she does not want to do the photo shoot anymore, and wants to come home. Wayne replies by telling her to be herself, and that he believes in her. She takes his advice, and the photographer is better satisfied with the photo shoot. Scenes of Wayne singing the song in a small room and playing guitar in front of several lights are seen throughout.

== Chart performance ==
"I Will" debuted at number 52 on the U.S. Billboard Hot Country Songs chart for the week of October 25, 2008, and entered the Top 40 in its third chart week. It charted for a total of 28 weeks, and peaked at 18 on the country chart dated April 4, 2009.

Chart (2008–2009)	Peak position
US Hot Country Songs (Billboard)	18
US Billboard Bubbling Under Hot 100	2
