= If I Want To =

Studio album by Jasmine Rae
- Released: August 2, 2013
- Genre: Country
- Length: 43:34
- Label: ABC
- Producer: Luke Wooten

Jasmine Rae chronology
Santa's Little Helper (2012)	If I Want To (2013)	Heartbeat (2015)

If I Want To is the third studio album by Australian country music singer Jasmine Rae. The album was released on 2 August 2013 and peaked at number 23 on the ARIA Charts. Upon release Rae said "I feel the songs on my new album are a reflection of the journey I've been on in the last two years. This album is an honest conversation between the listener and myself." adding "This isn't just the album I wanted to make, it's the only album I could have made. I personally needed to do this."

At the ARIA Music Awards of 2013, the album was nominated for Best Country Album.

== Reception ==
Stef Russin from Country Music Channel said "The new album feels different, sounds different and takes you in from the first note holding you until the final melodies fade out. Thirteen tracks simply are not enough." adding "If I Want To is a shoulder to cry on, a friend to pick you up when everything around you falls apart and your best friend on a crazy night out. It is a soundtrack that creates memories for each individual listener and for me, that's the greatest album you can have in your collection!"

== Track listing ==
No.	Title	Length
1.	"Rock N Roll Town"	3:12
2.	"Bad Boys Get Me Good" (featuring Kellie Pickler)	3:20
3.	"If I Want To"	3:26
4.	"Just Don't Ask Me How I Am"	3:46
5.	"Lazy Boy"	3:40
6.	"My Daddy's Name"	3:19
7.	"More Over Than This"	3:55
8.	"One Guy One Girl"	3:09
9.	"Broken Bridges"	3:27
10.	"These Hands"	3:19
11.	"I'm Your Girl"	3:03
12.	"Why'd You Tie The Knot"	2:24
13.	"First Song"	3:34

== Charts ==
=== Weekly charts ===
Chart (2013)	Peak position
Australian Albums (ARIA)	23
Australian Country Albums (ARIA)	2

=== Year-end charts ===
Chart (2013)	Peak position
Australian Country Albums (ARIA)	40

== Release history ==
Region	Date	Format	Edition(s)	Label	Catalogue
Australia	2 August 2013	CD; DD	Standard	ABC Music	3741975
Australia	23 August 2013	LP	Standard	ABC Music	4663809
