= Billy Kirsch =

American songwriter and consultant

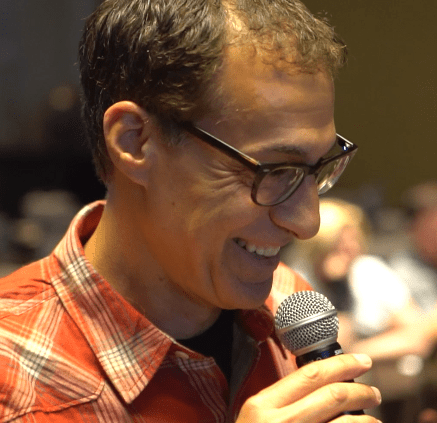
- Education: Wesleyan University
- Occupations: Songwriter and consultant
- Awards: Academy of Country Music Award; Country Music Association Award; Daytime Emmy Award nomination
- Website: kidbillymusic.com

Billy Kirsch is an American songwriter and consultant.

== Early life ==
Billy Kirsch attended Wesleyan University before leaving college to become a musician, focusing on a career as a jazz musician. After living in New York City, he moved to Nashville to enter the country music industry.

== Songwriting ==
Kirsch then became a songwriter for country music artists, working for publishers including Kidbilly Music and Nocturnal Eclipse Music. The first major performer to record a song of his was Kenny Rogers, and he wrote the song “Is It Over Yet” performed by Wynonna Judd.

1998 Kirsch co-wrote the song “Holes in the Floor of Heaven” with Steve Wariner, which received the Song of the Year prize from the Academy of Country Music that year. It also received the Country Music Association Award Song of the Year prize and a Grammy nomination for Best Country Song. The story behind Kirsch's writing of the song was published in the book Chicken Soup for the Soul: Country Music: The Inspirational Stories behind 101 of Your Favorite Country Songs.

In 2002 Kirsch's song “I Believe In The Mystery” was nominated for the Daytime Emmy Award for Outstanding Original Song. In 2003 Kirsch co-wrote the song "Stay Gone" with singer Jimmy Wayne, which was named one of BMI's 2003 songs of the year on American radio and television. Additionally he has written and published songs for artists including Rogers, Alabama, Engelbert Humperdinck, Tim McGraw, and Lee Greenwood.

== Consulting ==
In 2006 Kirsch created the “team building through song” concept and began a business consultancy. Clients that he has worked with through the company have included Walt Disney, Microsoft, L’Oréal, Harley-Davidson, and Pfizer. Kirsch is the president of the firm, Kidbilly Music Team Building.
