= Stay Gone =

Single by Jimmy Wayne

from the album Jimmy Wayne
- Released: January 20, 2003
- Genre: Country
- Length: 3:47
- Label: DreamWorks Nashville
- Songwriters: Billy Kirsch; Jimmy Wayne
- Producers: Chris Lindsey; James Stroud

Jimmy Wayne singles chronology
"Stay Gone" (2003)	"I Love You This Much" (2003)

Music video
- "Stay Gone" at CMT.com

"Stay Gone" is a debut song co-written and recorded by American country music singer Jimmy Wayne. It was released in January 2003 single as the lead-off single from his self-titled debut album on DreamWorks Records Nashville. It became his first Top 5 single on Hot Country Songs chart, peaking at #3. The song also reached #32 on the Billboard Hot 100 charts. Wayne co-wrote the song with Billy Kirsch.

== Content ==
"Stay Gone" is a ballad mostly accompanied by acoustic guitar and mandolin, with electric guitar solos preceding the third verse and chorus. The narrator tells his ex-lover that he is over her and wants her to "stay gone".

== Music video ==
The music video was directed by Trey Fanjoy. The video portrays Wayne singing and playing guitar in a desert.

== Critical reception ==
Rick Cohoon of Allmusic gave the song a favorable review. He stated in his review that Wayne "sends this one right to the pit of our stomachs, as we all know what it feels like to struggle for equilibrium after a breakup."

Fellow reviewer Thom Jurek described the song in his album review of Jimmy Wayne as "an invitation for the rest of us to remember our own experiences, despite his protagonist's plea to remain apart, out of sight, because of the pain."

== Chart performance ==
The song debuted at #58 on the Hot Country Singles & Tracks tracks chart dated February 8, 2003. Having charted for 28 weeks on that chart, it peaked at #3 on the country chart dated July 5, 2003, and at #32 on the Billboard Hot 100.

Chart (2003)	Peak position
US Billboard Hot 100	32
US Hot Country Songs (Billboard)	3

=== Year-end charts ===
Chart (2003)	Position
US Country Songs (Billboard)	21
