= Santa's Little Helper (EP) =

EP by Jasmine Rae
- Released: November 16, 2012
- Genre: Country, Christmas
- Length: 15:31
- Label: ABC

Jasmine Rae chronology
Listen Here (2011)	Santa's Little Helper (2012)	If I Want To (2013)

Santa's Little Helper is the debut extended play and first Christmas release by Australian country music singer Jasmine Rae. The EP includes two original tracks and three covers and was released in November 2012.

On 21 November 2012, Rae released a video for the lead single "Santa's Helper" with Rae explaining "Many Christmas songs are asking Santa to bring us love on Christmas Day. Others ask him to bring world peace and similar aspirations. This song is about asking Santa for a job!"

Upon released Rae said "Growing up, we kept our Christmas CDs in the same box as our Christmas tree for 11 months of the year. So when December came around, it was a really special experience for my brother and me to unpack the CDs and put them on as we all decorated the house." adding "It was, and still is, a really magical time at our place".

In an interview with Kelly Fuller on ABC radio, Rae told she's always wanted to make a Christmas album.

== Track listing ==
No.	Title	Writer(s)	Length
1.	"Santa Man"	Robyn Payne, Jasmine Rae	3:19
2.	"The Christmas Song"	Mel Tormé, Robert Wells	3:38
3.	"Christmas Alphabet"	Buddy Kaye, Jules Loman	3:26
4.	"Really Christmas?"	Payne, Rae	3:31
5.	"Rudolph the Red-Nosed Reindeer"	Johnny Marks	2:04

== Release history ==
Region	Date	Format	Edition(s)	Label	Catalogue
Australia	16 November 2012	CD; DD	Standard	ABC Music	3723217
