= Ashton Shepherd =

American country music singer-songwriter (born 1986)

- Born: Ashton Delilah Shepherd; August 16, 1986 (age 40); Coffeeville, Alabama, United States
- Genres: Country
- Occupation: Singer-songwriter
- Instruments: Vocals, acoustic guitar
- Years active: 2007–present
- Label: MCA Nashville
- Website: ashtonshepherdmusic.com

Ashton Delilah Shepherd (born August 16, 1986) is an American country music singer-songwriter. She was first signed to Universal Music Group Nashville's MCA Nashville division in April 2007. Her 2008 debut album Sounds So Good produced two top 40 hits on the Hot Country Songs charts: "Takin' Off This Pain" and the title track. In 2011, she released her second album, Where Country Grows, which includes the top 20 hit "Look It Up".

== Biography ==
Ashton Shepherd was born in Coffeeville, Alabama, United States. She began singing at an early age, and started writing songs at age five. By age eight, she had entered her first talent competition, where she sang Patsy Cline songs, and soon afterward, she began performing at various local venues as well. Her parents helped her finance a self-titled CD, which she released independently at age fifteen. In June 2006, she entered and won a talent contest in Gilbertown, Alabama. The prize was being the opening act for Lorrie Morgan in concert. Shepherd won the opening slot, and while performing as Morgan's opener, she was spotted by a representative of MCA Nashville Records, who then signed her to the label in April 2007.

Her debut single, "Takin' Off This Pain," was released in September 2007, the same month in which she made her debut on the Grand Ole Opry. The song, which peaked at No. 20 on the Billboard Hot Country Songs charts, was the first single from her debut album Sounds So Good, which was produced by Buddy Cannon and released on March 4, 2008. She also appeared on CMT's Unplugged at Studio 330 television program and subsequent interview March 5, 2008. The album's second single, its title track, was released in May 2008 and peaked at No. 21.

Shepherd's third single, "Look It Up," was released to country radio on January 3, 2011, as the lead-off single to her second album for MCA Nashville, Where Country Grows. It debuted at number 56 on the country charts for chart week ending January 15, 2011. The song entered the Top 40 of the charts in its third week and became her second Top 20 hit on the chart, reaching a peak of number 19 in May 2011. The title track was released as the second and final single from the album, and reached a peak of number 42 on the charts, becoming her first single to miss the Top 30. Shepherd parted ways with MCA Nashville in mid-2012.

Shepherd also performed backup vocals on "Tailgate Blues", a track on Luke Bryan's 2011 album, Tailgates & Tanlines.

After ending her relationship with MCA Nashville, Shepherd started her own company to pursue releasing music independently. Her third studio album, This Is America, was released on August 16, 2013, via Shepherd's own Pickin' Shed Records. The title track was released as the lead single in July 2013.

Shepherd released her fourth studio album, Out of My Pocket, on June 14, 2016.

== Discography ==
=== Studio albums ===
Title	Details	Peak chart positions	
Title	Details	US Country	US
Sounds So Good	Release date: March 4, 2008; Label: MCA Nashville; Formats: CD, music download	16	90
Where Country Grows	Release date: July 12, 2011; Label: MCA Nashville; Formats: CD, music download	11	37
This Is America	Release date: August 16, 2013; Label: Pickin' Shed Records; Formats: CD, music download	—	—
Out of My Pocket	Release date: June 14, 2016; Label: Pickin' Shed Records; Formats: CD, music download	—	—
"—" denotes releases that did not chart

=== Extended plays ===
Title	Details	Peak positions
Title	Details	US Country
Look It Up	Release date: March 22, 2011; Label: MCA Nashville; Formats: CD, music download	71

=== Singles ===
Year	Single	Peak chart positions		Album
Year	Single	US Country	US	Album
2007	"Takin' Off This Pain"	20	—^{A}	Sounds So Good
2008	"Sounds So Good"	21	—^{A}	Sounds So Good
2011	"Look It Up"	19	95	Where Country Grows
2011	"Where Country Grows"	42	—	Where Country Grows
2013	"This Is America"	—	—	This Is America
2014	"Seventeen Again"	—	—	This Is America
2016	"With Us Tellin' The Truth"	—	—	Out of My Pocket
"—" denotes releases that did not chart

- ^{A} "Takin' Off This Pain" and "Sounds So Good" did not enter the Hot 100, but peaked at number 16 on Bubbling Under Hot 100 Singles.

=== Music videos ===
Year	Video	Director
2007	"Takin' Off This Pain" (version 1)	Shaun Silva
2008	"Takin' Off This Pain" (version 2)	Danny Clinch/Becky Fluke
2008	"Sounds So Good"	Roman White
2011	"Look It Up"	Michael Salomon
2011	"Where Country Grows"	Trey Fanjoy

== Other appearances ==
Year	Song	Artist	Album
2009	"Polyrically Uncorrect"	Cledus T. Judd	Polyrically Uncorrect
