= Where Country Grows (song) =

Single by Ashton Shepherd

from the album Where Country Grows
- Released: July 11, 2011
- Studio: Blackbird Studios
- Genre: Country
- Length: 3:12
- Label: MCA Nashville
- Songwriters: Bobby Pinson; Ashton Shepherd
- Producer: Buddy Cannon

Ashton Shepherd singles chronology
"Look It Up" (2011)	"Where Country Grows" (2011)	"This Is America" (2013)

"Where Country Grows" is a song released as a single by American country singer–songwriter Ashton Shepherd. It was co-written by Shepherd, along with Bobby Pinson. The song was first released as the title track to Shepherd's second studio album of the same name. The album and single were both issued on the MCA Nashville label.

== Background and content ==
"Where Country Grows" was composed by Ashton Shepherd, along with songwriter Bobby Pinson. It was among Shepherd's first experiences collaborating on songwriting. In a 2011 interview, Shepherd explained she was hesitant about the process, but was pleased with the results: "Once I started, I really, really enjoyed it. I felt like we had plenty of songs to choose from." The song was recorded at Blackbird Studios, located in Nashville, Tennessee. It was produced by Buddy Cannon, who had also produced Shepherd's previous singles and the album for which "Where Country Grows" was named for.

== Critical reception ==
"Where Country Grows" was given a positive reception from writers and critics. Billy Dukes of Taste of Country praised the song's discussion of nostalgic moments in his reviews and concluded by saying, "Only in country music can we celebrate and look forward to a good cry. 'Where Country Grows' isn't a weeper, but it is an understated stop-and-thinker." Kevin John Coyne of Country Universe gave the song a "C" rating in his review of the track. Matt Bjorke of Roughstock called the song "clever" and "catchy." Stephen Thomas Erlewine of AllMusic highlighted the song as being one of the "best poppier tunes" on her 2011 album. He described his reasoning further in his review: "...she has a knack for tracing the arc of a relationship or looking back without wallowing in nostalgia..."

== Release and chart performance ==
"Where Country Grows" was released as a single via MCA Nashville on July 11, 2011. It was the second single released from Shepherd's second album of the same name, which was also issued by MCA in July 2011. The track spent 16 weeks on the Billboard Hot Country Songs chart. In August 2011, the single reached a peak position of 42 on the chart. It is Shepherd's lowest-charting single to date and her final charting single release to date. A music video was released for the single in September 2011, which featured Shepherd along with her husband and extended family.

== Charts ==
Chart (2011)	Peak position
US Hot Country Songs (Billboard)	42
