= Look It Up (song) =

Single by Ashton Shepherd

from the album Where Country Grows
- Released: January 3, 2011
- Genre: Country
- Length: 2:59
- Label: MCA Nashville
- Songwriter: Angaleena Presley; Robert Ellis Orrall
- Producer: Buddy Cannon

Ashton Shepherd singles chronology
"Sounds So Good" (2008)	"Look It Up" (2011)	"Where Country Grows" (2011)

"Look It Up" is a song written by Robert Ellis Orrall and Angaleena Presley, and originally recorded by Australian country music artist Jasmine Rae in 2008. It was later recorded by American country music artist Ashton Shepherd, whose version was released in January 2011 as the lead single to her second studio album, Where Country Grows.

== Content ==
"Look It Up" is a moderate up-tempo country song. The song's female narrator expresses her dissatisfaction with being done wrong by her man who has been seeing another woman. She tells him multiple words dealing with his wrongdoing (such as 'liar,' 'forgiveness,' and 'faithful') and suggests he "look [them] up."

Shepherd described it as, "a song about somebody who is officially done with something to the point that they are really over it. It's almost like they aren't that mad anymore, just ready to be through with it, just done. 'Done' is a good word."

== Critical reception ==
Stephen M. Deusner of Engine 145 gave the song a thumbs up, favorably describing the lyrics as "clever" and complimenting Shepherd's "intense twang." Kevin John Coyne of Country Universe gave it a C rating, calling the song "outdated." He also stated that while "Ashton Shepherd is bringing country back to country, [...] a dull vocal isn’t improved by exaggerated twang. It just sounds forced."

== Music video ==
The video was directed by Michael Salomon and was released a few days after the single was sent to radio. In it, Shepherd's former love interest is shown coming home to find her having a yard sale to get rid of all his possessions. He confronts her about it, only to have her confront him about his cheating. He spends the rest of the video trying to take back his stuff from the customers while Shepherd advises him to look up words that describe his infidelity. Additionally, scenes of Shepherd performing the song from within a garage are included.

== Chart performance ==
"Look It Up" debuted at number 55 on the U.S. Billboard Hot Country Songs chart for the week of January 15, 2011. It reached a peak of number 19 on the chart dated May 28, 2011.

Chart (2011)	Peak position
US Hot Country Songs (Billboard)	19
US Billboard Hot 100	95

=== Year-end charts ===
Chart (2011)	Position
US Country Songs (Billboard)	75
