= Paper Angels =

Single by Jimmy Wayne

from the album Jimmy Wayne
- Released: October 25, 2004
- Genre: Country
- Length: 3:48
- Label: DreamWorks
- Songwriters: Jimmy Wayne; Don Sampson
- Producers: Chris Lindsey; James Stroud

Jimmy Wayne singles chronology
"You Are" (2004)	"Paper Angels" (2004)	"That's All I'll Ever Need" (2006)

"Paper Angels" is a song co-written and recorded by American country music artist Jimmy Wayne. It was released in October 2004 as the fourth single from his debut album Jimmy Wayne. Wayne wrote the song with Don Sampson.

== Content ==
The song is about the Salvation Army's Angel Tree program, in which the organization decorates a Christmas tree with paper angels representing children who are in need. It is in a moderately slow tempo and the key of A major, with a main chord pattern of A-E/G♯-F♯m^{7}-D.

Wayne later wrote a novel, also titled Paper Angels, about a family who is aided by the Salvation Army's program.

== Critical reception ==
The song received a favorable review from Thom Jurek of Allmusic, who wrote that "as the power chords and mandolin entwine around his reaching vocals and cascading acoustic guitar, we come to understand that he can understand that he can sing this way because he's been one of these children."

== Music video ==
The music video was directed by Peter Zavadil and premiered in November 2004. Due to the song having somewhat of a theme with Christmas (though it is not officially considered a traditional Christmas song) the video is only played during the Christmas season, when many holiday music videos are normally shown.

== Chart performance ==
The song charted for three weeks from unsolicited airplay on the U.S. Billboard Hot Country Singles & Tracks chart in December 2003–January 2004, peaking at number 40. Upon being released as a single, it re-entered at number 57 in November 2004 and peaked at number 18 in January 2005, tying the record for the highest-charting seasonal title of the SoundScan era, which was set by Jeff Foxworthy's "Redneck 12 Days of Christmas".

Chart (2003–2004)	Peak position
US Country Songs (Billboard)	40
Chart (2004–2005)	Peak position
US Hot Country Songs (Billboard)	18
US Billboard Bubbling Under Hot 100	8
