= Jimmy Wayne =

American singer-songwriter

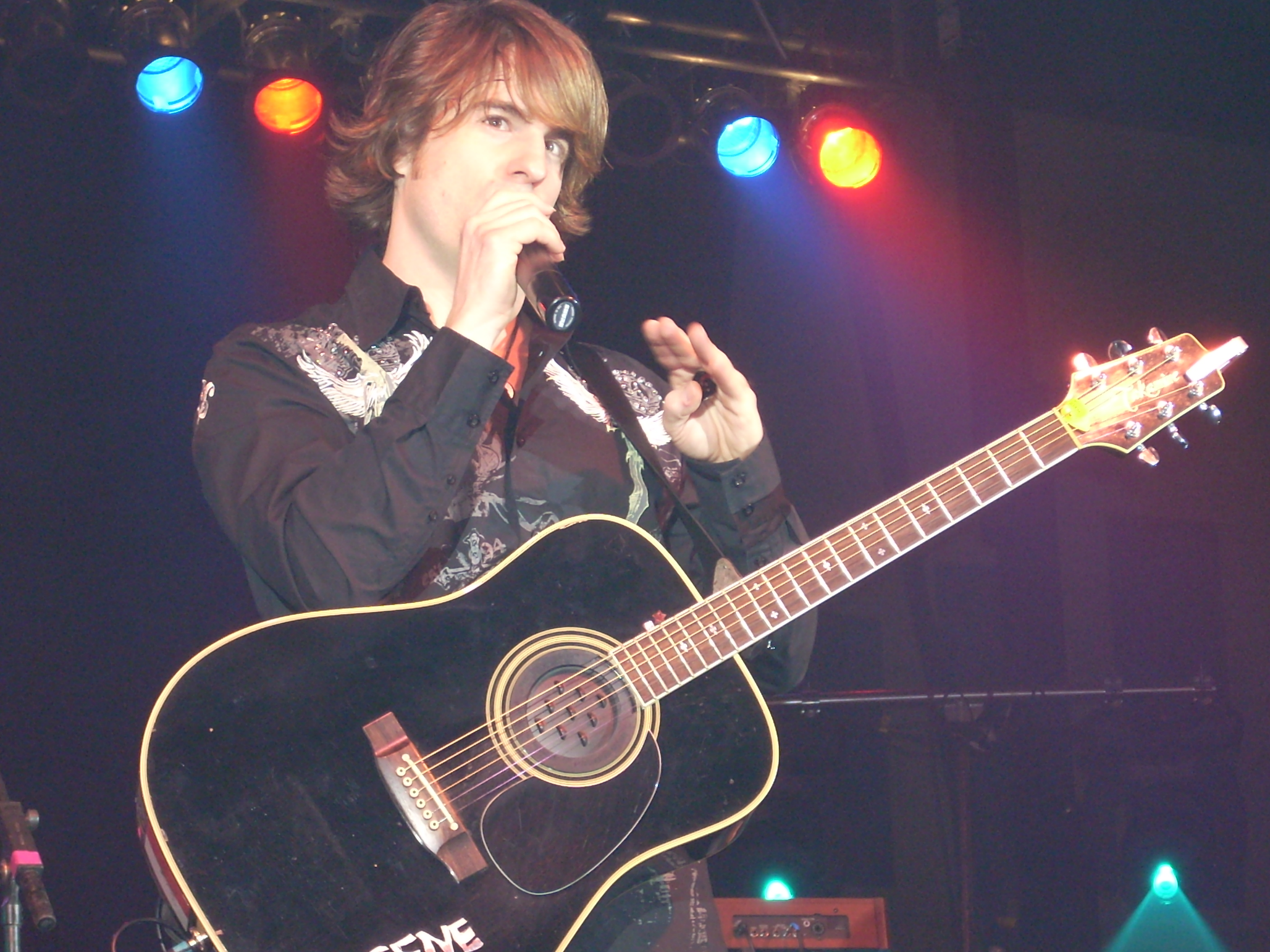
- Wayne in Madison, Wisconsin, October 25, 2008

Background information
- Born: Jimmy Wayne Barber; October 23, 1972 (age 53); Kings Mountain, North Carolina, U.S.
- Origin: Nashville, Tennessee, U.S.
- Genres: Country
- Occupation(s): Singer-songwriter, author
- Instrument(s): Vocals, guitar
- Years active: 1999–present
- Labels: DreamWorks Nashville; Big Machine Records; Valory Music Group
- Website: jimmywayne.com

Jimmy Wayne Barber (born October 23, 1972) is an American country music singer and songwriter. He released his self-titled debut album in 2003 on the DreamWorks Records label. Four singles were released from it, including "Stay Gone" and "I Love You This Much", which both reached Top Ten on the Billboard country charts. A second album, Do You Believe Me Now, was released in August 2008 via Big Machine Records subsidiary Valory Music Group, and its title track became his first Number One hit in late 2008. Sara Smile followed in 2009.

== Early life ==
Jimmy Wayne was born on October 23, 1972, in Kings Mountain, North Carolina, and grew up in Bessemer City. His biological father abandoned him, and he and his sister were raised in and out of foster homes or were left with other people when their mother would leave them or was in prison. She served four months in prison in 1985 when Wayne was 12. After entering a group home, Wayne ran away and lived with his mother for a brief time before living on the streets and with his sister, Patricia, for a short while. He was invited to move in with an elderly couple, Russell and Bea Costner, (just down the road from where his mother was living), after being hired to mow their lawn. After finishing high school and earning a degree in Criminal Justice, he worked as a guard at the Gaston Correctional Facility, where he worked as a corrections officer for four years before moving to Nashville, Tennessee, to pursue his musical interests.

== Musical career ==
In Nashville, Wayne worked as a songwriter for Acuff-Rose Music, collaborating with Dean Dillon, Sanger D. Shafer and others while practicing his guitar and songwriting skills. One of his first cuts as a songwriter was "Put Your Hand in Mine," released by Tracy Byrd in late 1999 from the album It's About Time. By 2001, Wayne had signed to a recording contract with DreamWorks Records' Nashville division.

=== Jimmy Wayne ===
Wayne released his debut single, "Stay Gone," in 2003. This song was inspired by his sister, Patricia, who explained her marital troubles to him by saying "everything would be better if her husband would just stay gone," according to CMT. This song went on to peak at No. 3 on the U.S. Billboard Hot Country Singles & Tracks (now Hot Country Songs) charts that year. It was also the first release from his self-titled debut album, produced by Chris Lindsey and James Stroud. "I Love You This Much," the next single, went on to peak at No. 6, followed by "You Are" and "Paper Angels," both at No. 18. The album also included the song "Blue and Brown," which Wayne wrote about a foster brother who ended up a prison inmate at the correctional facility Wayne worked. "Paper Angels", written about the Salvation Army's Angel Tree program, earned him a William Booth Award from the organization.

=== Big Machine and Valory (2006–2009) ===
After DreamWorks closed in 2005, Wayne was transferred to Big Machine Records. His first release for the label was "That's All I'll Ever Need," which he co-wrote with Mark Nesler and Tony Martin. This song was slated to be the lead-off single to a second album with a projected release date of early 2007.

Wayne later moved to Big Machine's sister label, Valory Music Group. His first single for Valory, "Do You Believe Me Now," entered the country charts in April 2008 and became his third Top Ten in August 2008. A second studio album, titled Do You Believe Me Now, was released on August 26. For the week of September 13, 2008, the title track became his first and only Number One hit on the Hot Country Songs chart. "I Will" was released in October 2008 as the second single from Do You Believe Me Now, and it peaked at No. 18. The next single, "I'll Be That", debuted at No. 56 in May 2009, reaching a peak of No. 46.

=== Sara Smile (2009–2010) ===
In September 2009, Wayne released a cover version of Hall & Oates' 1976 single "Sara Smile", with backing vocals from the 70's and 80's pop duo themselves. This cover is the lead-off single to his second album of the same name for Valory, released on November 23. The song has become Wayne's seventh Top 40 country single, as well as Hall & Oates' first Top 40 country single. The album's second single is "Just Knowing You Love Me," a duet with Whitney Duncan, which debuted and peaked at No. 59 on the Billboard Hot Country Songs chart.

Wayne joined Brad Paisley and Dierks Bentley on the American Saturday Night tour in mid-2009.

Wayne was dropped by Big Machine Records/Valory Music Company in May 2010 midway through his walk halfway across America to raise awareness for the 30,000 youth aging out of foster care every year in the U.S.

== Meet Me Halfway ==
On January 1, 2010, Wayne set out on a 1,660-mile (2,670 km) walk from Nashville, Tennessee, to Phoenix, Arizona, to raise awareness to the plight of the 30,000 children who age out of foster care every year in America, into homelessness homeless youth aging out foster system. Called the "Meet Me Halfway" campaign, he walked 25 miles (40 km) a day, only taking days off the walk for scheduled concerts and to go to the California State Capitol to speak in favor of a bill that would increase the age kids age out of the foster system from 18 to 21.

He successfully arrived in Phoenix on August 1, 2010, after suffering a broken foot four days prior, having successfully walked 1,700 miles over seven months. Even after completing his walk, Wayne continues to advocate for foster children. He has been a spokesperson for CASA (Court Appointed Special Advocates), a national network of volunteers who represent the best interests of abused and neglected children in the courtroom and other settings. and says his goal is to have the age that youth "age out" of foster care raised from 18 to 21 across all 50 states and to bring awareness to the cause of foster youth who are aging out of the system.

== Writing ==
In 2012, he co-wrote the novel Paper Angels, a Christmas story about a child who receives help from the Salvation Army's Angel Tree program and the man who picked his name. He wrote Walk to Beautiful: The Power of Love and a Homeless Kid Who Found the Way with Ken Abraham. The autobiography, published in 2014, details his life story which inspired the "Meet Me Halfway" campaign. In 2017, he wrote and published Ruby The Foster Dog, a children's book, published by Broadstreet Kids in November 2017. The book chronicles Wayne's adopting a dog during his walk halfway across America. The story is told from the dog's perspective. Simultaneously, Wayne released Ruby Toons, a 13-song album of songs reflecting themes in Ruby The Foster Dog.

== Discography ==
=== Studio albums ===
Title	Album details	Peak chart positions	
Title	Album details	US Country	US
Jimmy Wayne	Release date: June 24, 2003; Label: DreamWorks Nashville; Formats: CD	7	64
Do You Believe Me Now	Release date: August 26, 2008; Label: Valory Music Group; Formats: CD, music download	4	27
Sara Smile	Release date: November 23, 2009; Label: Valory Music Group; Formats: CD, music download	32	—
"—" denotes releases that did not chart

=== Singles ===
Year	Single	Peak chart positions				Album
Year	Single	US Country	US	US AC	CAN	Album
2003	"Stay Gone"	3	32	—	—	Jimmy Wayne
2003	"I Love You This Much"	6	53	—	—	Jimmy Wayne
2004	"You Are"	18	— (Note: "You Are" and "Paper Angels" did not enter the Hot 100, but both peaked at number 8 on the Bubbling Under Hot 100 Singles charts.)	—	—	Jimmy Wayne
2004	"Paper Angels"	18	—	—	—	Jimmy Wayne
2006	"That's All I'll Ever Need"	50	—	—	—	—
2007	"I'll Never Leave You"	—	—	—	—	—
2008	"Do You Believe Me Now"	1	36	29	64	Do You Believe Me Now
2008	"I Will"	18	— (Note: "I Will" did not enter the Hot 100, but peaked at number 2 on the Bubbling Under Hot 100 Singles charts.)	—	—	Do You Believe Me Now
2009	"I'll Be That"	46	—	—	—	Do You Believe Me Now
2009	"Sara Smile" (with Daryl Hall and John Oates)	31	—	—	—	Sara Smile
2010	"Just Knowing You Love Me" (with Whitney Duncan)	59	—	—	—	Sara Smile
"—" denotes releases that did not chart

=== Other charted songs ===
Year	Single	Peak chart positions	Album
Year	Single	US Country	Album
2003	"Paper Angels"	40 (Note: "Paper Angels" originally charted from unsolicited airplay received in 2003, reaching number 40; it was officially re-released in 2004 and reached a new peak of number 18.)	Jimmy Wayne

=== Music videos ===
Year	Video	Director
2003	"Stay Gone"	Trey Fanjoy
2004	"I Love You This Much"	Trey Fanjoy
2004	"Paper Angels"	Peter Zavadil
2008	"Do You Believe Me Now"	Deaton-Flanigen Productions
2008	"I Will"	Deaton-Flanigen Productions
2009	"I'll Be That"	Todd Cassetty
2009	"Sara Smile"	Tracie Goudie
