= Little Big Town discography =

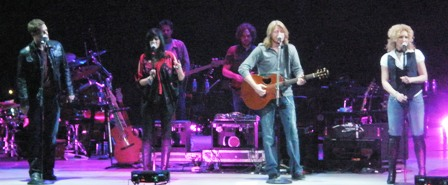
- Little Big Town performing live on February 28, 2008. (L–R: Jimi Westbrook, Karen Fairchild, Phillip Sweet, Kimberly Schlapman)
- Studio albums: 12
- Compilation albums: 1
- Singles: 35
- Music videos: 36

American country music group Little Big Town has released twelve studio albums and 27 singles.

Little Big Town released their self-titled debut album on Monument Nashville in 2002, though they only managed one Top 40 hit on the US Billboard Hot Country Songs chart. They returned in 2005 with The Road to Here, which was released on Equity Music Group. It produced four Top 20 hits, including "Boondocks" and "Bring It on Home", both of which reached the Top 10. They followed it with A Place to Land, though the lead single, "I'm with the Band", was unsuccessful and the group was left without a label shortly after the album's release when Equity folded. Little Big Town was quickly re-signed by Capitol Nashville, who re-released A Place to Land and promoted two more singles from it. In 2010, Little Big Town scored their first Top 10 hit in four years with "Little White Church", the lead single to their fourth studio album, The Reason Why. Their fifth studio album, Tornado, was released on September 11, 2012, and lead single "Pontoon" became their first number one hit. The second single, the title track, reached number 2 on the Country Airplay chart in 2013.

== Studio albums ==
Title	Album details	Peak chart positions										Certifications	Sales
Title	Album details	US	US Country	US Heat.	US Indie	AUS	CAN	NZ Heat	SCO	UK	UK Country	Certifications	Sales
Little Big Town	Release date: May 21, 2002; Label: Monument Nashville; Formats: Cassette, CD	—	40	43	—	—	—	—	—	—	—		
The Road to Here	Release date: October 4, 2005; Label: Equity Music Group; Formats: CD, digital download	51	12	—	1	—	—	—	—	—	—	RIAA: Platinum	
A Place to Land (Note: A Place to Land was re-issued in late 2008 by Capitol Records Nashville with four bonus tracks.)	Release date: November 6, 2007; Label: Equity Music Group; Formats: CD, digital download	24	10	—	3	—	—	—	—	—	—		
The Reason Why	Release date: August 24, 2010; Label: Capitol Nashville; Formats: CD, digital download, LP	5	1	—	—	—	—	—	—	—	—		
Tornado	Release date: September 11, 2012; Label: Capitol Nashville; Formats: CD, digital download, LP	2	1	—	—	—	16	—	—	—	—	RIAA: 2× Platinum; MC: Gold	US: 1,025,000
Pain Killer	Release date: October 21, 2014; Label: Capitol Nashville; Formats: CD, digital download, LP	7	3	—	—	—	49	—	—	143	2	RIAA: Platinum	US: 511,300
Wanderlust	Release date: June 10, 2016; Label: Capitol Nashville; Formats: CD, Digital download, LP	103	—	—	—	—	—	—	—	—	6		
The Breaker	Release date: February 24, 2017; Label: Capitol Nashville; Formats: CD, digital download, LP	4	1	—	—	26	15	10	23	65	1	RIAA: Gold	US: 210,000
Nightfall	Release date: January 17, 2020; Label: Capitol Nashville; Formats: CD, digital download, LP	13	1	—	—	88	65	—	40	—	1		US: 43,800
Mr. Sun	Release date: September 16, 2022; Label: Capitol Nashville; Formats: CD, digital download, LP	56	10	—	—	—	—	—	—	—	—		
The Christmas Record	Release date: October 4, 2024; Label: Capitol Nashville; Formats: CD, digital download, LP	—	—	—	—	—	—	—	—	—	—		
It's a Dying Art	Release date: August 28, 2026; Label: MCA; Formats: CD, digital download, LP	—	—	—	—	—	—	—	—	—	8		
"—" denotes a recording that did not chart or was not released in that territory

== Compilation albums ==
Title	Album details	Peak chart positions
Title	Album details	US Country
Four Album Collection (Note: Four Album Collection includes The Road to Here, A Place to Land, The Reason Why, and Tornado.)	Released: October 21, 2014; Label: Capitol Nashville; Formats: CD, digital download	—
Greatest Hits	Released: August 9, 2024; Label: Capitol Nashville; Formats: CD, digital download, LP	49

== Extended plays ==
Title	EP details
Scattered, Smothered, and Covered	Release date: October 30, 2025; Label: Capitol Nashville; Format: digital download

== Singles ==
=== As lead artist ===
Title	Year	Peak chart positions							Sales	Certifications	Album
Title	Year	US	US Country	US Country Airplay	US AC	US Adult	CAN	CAN Country	Sales	Certifications	Album
"Don't Waste My Time"	2002	—	33		—	—	—	—			Little Big Town
"Everything Changes"	2002	—	42		—	—	—	—			Little Big Town
"Boondocks"	2005	46	9		—	—	—	15		RIAA: 3× Platinum	The Road to Here
"Bring It On Home"	2006	58	4		—	—	—	13			The Road to Here
"Good as Gone"	2006	—	18		—	—	—	48			The Road to Here
"A Little More You"	2007	— (Note: "A Little More You" did not enter the Hot 100, but peaked at number 1 on Bubbling Under Hot 100 Singles.)	20		—	—	—	—			The Road to Here
"I'm with the Band"	2007	—	32		—	—	—	—			A Place to Land
"Fine Line"	2008	—	31		—	—	—	—			A Place to Land
"Good Lord Willing" (Note: "Good Lord Willing" is found only on the 2008 re-issue of A Place to Land.)	2008	—	43		—	—	—	—			A Place to Land
"Little White Church"	2010	59	6		—	—	—	38		RIAA: Platinum	The Reason Why
"Kiss Goodbye"	2010	—	42		—	—	—	—			The Reason Why
"The Reason Why"	2011	—	42		—	—	—	—			The Reason Why
"Pontoon"	2012	22	1		—	—	39	1	US: 2,655,000	RIAA: 6× Platinum; MC: Platinum	Tornado
"Tornado"	2012	51	6	2	—	—	60	4	US: 693,000	RIAA: Platinum; MC: Gold	Tornado
"Your Side of the Bed"	2013	96	29	27	—	—	—	—	US: 200,000	RIAA: Gold	Tornado
"Sober"	2013	— (Note: "Sober" did not enter the Hot 100, but peaked at number 2 on Bubbling Under Hot 100 Singles.)	27	31	—	—	—	35		RIAA: Gold	Tornado
"Day Drinking"	2014	40	4	2	—	—	50	1	US: 671,000	RIAA: 2× Platinum	Pain Killer
"Girl Crush"	2014	18	1	3	29	23	29	11	US: 2,550,000	RIAA: 7× Platinum; BPI: Silver; RMNZ: Gold	Pain Killer
"Pain Killer"	2015	—	49	38	—	—	—	35			Pain Killer
"One of Those Days"	2016	—	— (Note: "One of Those Days" did not enter Hot Country Songs or Country Airplay, but peaked at number 34 on Country Digital Song Sales.)		—	—	—	—			Wanderlust
"Better Man"	2016	34	1	1	—	—	56	1	US: 772,000	RIAA: 3× Platinum; MC: Gold	The Breaker
"Happy People"	2017	—	40	46	—	—	—	—	US: 40,000		The Breaker
"When Someone Stops Loving You"	2017	—	36	37	—	—	—	—	US: 68,000	RIAA: Gold	The Breaker
"Summer Fever"	2018	—	32	29	—	—	—	40			Non-album single
"The Daughters"	2019	—	29	—	—	—	—	—			Nightfall
"Over Drinking"	2019	—	—	49	—	—	—	—			Nightfall
"Wine, Beer, Whiskey"	2020	100	23	32	—	—	—	46		RIAA: 2× Platinum; MC: Gold	Nightfall
"Never Love You Again" (with Cheat Codes and Bryn Christopher)	2021	—	—	—	—	—	—	—			One Night in Nashville
"Hell Yeah"	2022	91	22	37	—	—	—	49		RIAA: Gold	Mr. Sun
"Hey There Sunshine"	2026	—	—	—	—	—	—	—			It's a Dying Art
"—" denotes a recording that did not chart or was not released in that territory

=== As featured artist ===
Title	Year	Peak chart positions							Album
Title	Year	US	US Country	US Country Airplay	AUS	CAN	CAN Country	SCO	Album
"A Ride Back Home" (John Mellencamp featuring Karen Fairchild)	2009	—	—	—	—	—	—	—	Life, Death, Love and Freedom
"Smokin' and Drinkin'" (Miranda Lambert featuring Little Big Town)	2015	—	32	33	—	—	46	—	Platinum
"Home Alone Tonight" (Luke Bryan featuring Karen Fairchild)	2015	38	3	1	—	55	1	—	Kill the Lights
"Take Me Down" (Vince Gill featuring Little Big Town)	2016	—	—	60	—	—	—	—	Down to My Last Bad Habit
"Forever Country" (part of Artists of Then, Now & Forever)	2016	21	1	32	26	25	34	29	Non-album singles
"Call Your Mama" (Seth Ennis featuring Little Big Town)	2018	—	—	—	—	—	—	—	Non-album singles
"What the Stars See" (Cassadee Pope featuring Karen Fairchild and Lindsay Ell)	2021	—	—	—	—	—	—	—	Thrive
"Butterflies" (Emily Weisband featuring Karen Fairchild)	2021	—	—	—	—	—	—	—	Non-album single
"Fillin' My Cup" (Hailey Whitters featuring Little Big Town)	2021	—	—	—	—	—	—	—	The Dream: Living the Dream

== Other singles ==
=== Promotional singles ===
Single	Year	Album
"Why, Oh Why"	2010	The Reason Why
"All the Way Down"	2010	The Reason Why
"We Went to the Beach"	2017	The Breaker
"Rocket Man"	2018	Restoration: The Songs of Elton John and Bernie Taupin
"Don't Threaten Me with a Good Time"	2019	Center Point Road
"Sugar Coat"	2019	Nightfall
"Nightfall"	2019	Nightfall
"Better Love"	2022	Mr Sun
"Shut Up Train" (Collab Version) (featuring Kelsea Ballerini)	2024	Greatest Hits

=== Other charted songs ===
Title	Year	Peak chart positions						Album
Title	Year	US	US Country	US Country Airplay	US Christ	CAN	CAN Country	Album
"Go Tell It on the Mountain"	2006	—	35		—	—	—	Non-album single
"Life in a Northern Town" (with Sugarland and Jake Owen)	2008	43	28		—	53	30	Love on the Inside / A Place to Land (re-issue)
"Have Yourself a Merry Little Christmas"	2012	—	—	49	—	—	—	Non-album single
"Deep River Woman" (with Lionel Richie)	2012	—	—	60	—	—	—	Tuskegee
"Silent Night" (with Michael W. Smith)	2015	—	—	—	48	—	—	The Spirit of Christmas
"Next to You"	2020	—	40	—	—	—	—	Nightfall
"—" denotes a recording that did not chart or was not released in that territory

== Other appearances ==
Year	Song	Artist	Album
2008	"Life in a Northern Town"	Sugarland and Jake Owen	Love on the Inside
2010	"Little White Church"	Little Big Town	Now That's What I Call Country Volume 3
2012	"Deep River Woman"	Lionel Richie	Tuskegee
2013	"Pontoon"	Little Big Town	Now That's What I Call Country Volume 6
2014	"When They're Gone (Lyle County)"	David Nail	I'm a Fire
2014	"Smokin' and Drinkin'"	Miranda Lambert	Platinum
2014	"Silent Night"	Michael W. Smith	The Spirit of Christmas
2015	"Day Drinking"	Little Big Town	2015 Grammy Nominees
2015	"Home Alone Tonight" (Karen Fairchild only)	Luke Bryan	Kill the Lights
2016	"Girl Crush"	Little Big Town	2016 Grammy Nominees
2016	"Take Me Down"	Vince Gill	Down to My Last Bad Habit
2018	"Rocket Man"	Various	Restoration
2019	"Don't Threaten Me with a Good Time"	Thomas Rhett	Center Point Road
2019	"The Thing That Wrecks You"	Lady Antebellum	Ocean
2020	"Whenever I Call You Friend" (Phillip Sweet only)	Sara Evans	Copy That
2020	"More Hearts Than Mine" (Karen Fairchild and Kimberley Schlapman only)	Ingrid Andress	Lady Like
2021	"Lonely Days"	Barry Gibb	Greenfields
2021	"How Deep Is Your Love"	Barry Gibb	Greenfields

== Music videos ==
All of Little Big Town's singles have featured music videos (except "The Reason Why"). The video for "Life in a Northern Town" was filmed live in concert.

Year	Video	Director
2002	"Don't Waste My Time"	Trey Fanjoy
2002	"Everything Changes"	Trey Fanjoy
2005	"Boondocks"	Roger Pistole
2006	"Bring It On Home"	Kristin Barlowe
2006	"Good as Gone"	Chris Hicky
2007	"A Little More You"	Roger Pistole
2007	"I'm with the Band"	Charles Mehling
2008	"Life in a Northern Town" (with Sugarland and Jake Owen)	Becky Fluke
2008	"Fine Line"	Charles Mehling
2008	"Good Lord Willing"	Becky Fluke
2009	"A Ride Back Home" (with John Mellencamp) (Karen Fairchild only)	Jamie Anderson
2010	"Little White Church"	Kristin Barlowe
2010	"Kiss Goodbye"	David McClister
2011	"Shut Up Train"	Becky Fluke
2012	"Pontoon"	Declan Whitebloom
2012	"Tornado"	Shane Drake
2013	"Your Side of the Bed"	Becky Fluke
2014	"Sober"	Reid Long
2014	"Day Drinking"	Declan Whitebloom
2015	"Girl Crush"	Karla & Matthew Welch
2015	"Smokin' and Drinkin'" (live) (with Miranda Lambert)	Paul Miller
2015	"Pain Killer"	Roger Pistole
2016	"Forever Country" (Artists of Then, Now & Forever)	Joseph Kahn
2016	"Better Man"	Reid Long & Becky Fluke
2017	"Happy People"	Reid Long & Becky Fluke
2017	"When Someone Stops Loving You"	Karla & Matthew Welch
2018	"Rocket Man"	TK McKamy
2018	"Summer Fever"	Michael Monaco
2018	"Call Your Mama" (with Seth Ennis)	Jeffrey C. Phillips
2019	"The Daughters"	Dano Cerny
2019	"Over Drinking"	Stephen and Alexa Kinigopoulos
2019	"Sugar Coat"	Stephen and Alexa Kinigopoulos
2020	"Wine, Beer, Whiskey"	Stephen and Alexa Kinigopoulos
2022	"Hell Yeah"	Blair Getz Mezibov
2022	"Three Whiskeys and the Truth"	Stephen and Alexa Kinigopoulos
2022	"Rich Man"	Running Bear
