= Good as Gone =

Single by Little Big Town

from the album The Road to Here
- Released: September 25, 2006
- Genre: Country
- Length: 4:12
- Label: Equity
- Songwriters: Karen Fairchild; Kimberly Schlapman; Phillip Sweet; Jimi Westbrook; Wayne Kirkpatrick
- Producers: Wayne Kirkpatrick; Little Big Town

Little Big Town singles chronology
"Bring It On Home" (2006)	"Good as Gone" (2006)	"A Little More You" (2007)

"Good as Gone" is a song co-written recorded by American country music group Little Big Town. It was released in September 2006 as the third single from their album The Road to Here. The song was written by group members Karen Fairchild, Kimberly Schlapman, Phillip Sweet and Jimi Westbrook with Wayne Kirkpatrick.

== Critical reception ==
The song received a favorable review from Deborah Evans Price of Billboard, who wrote that "this energetic, uptempo number showcases the group's stellar harmonies as well as its songwriting prowess."

== Music video ==
The music video was directed by Chris Hicky and premiered in September 2006.

== Chart performance ==
The song debuted at number 58 on the U.S. Billboard Hot Country Songs chart for the week of September 30, 2006.

Chart (2006–2007)	Peak position
US Hot Country Songs (Billboard)	18
