= Pain Killer Tour =

2014–15 concert tour by Little Big Town

- Tour by Little Big Town
- Promotional poster for the tour
- Associated album: Pain Killer
- Start date: November 8, 2014
- End date: November 21, 2015
- Legs: 5
- No. of shows: 54

Little Big Town concert chronology
- Tornado Tour (2012); Pain Killer Tour (2014-15); The Breakers Tour (2017-18)

The Pain Killer Tour was the third headlining tour by American country music band Little Big Town. The tour was in support of their sixth studio album Painkiller (2014), and began on November 8, 2014, in Youngstown, Ohio. It concluded on November 21, 2015, in Spokane, Washington. Little Big Town consists of Karen Fairchild, Jimi Westbrook, Kimberly Schalpman and Philip Sweet.

== Background ==
Little Big Town first announced the tour in August 2014. Band member Karen Fairchild says, "We are so excited to share Pain Killer and get on the road for this tour", "Kimberly, Phillip, Jimi and I are thrilled to have such amazing openers in Brett and Brothers...we're big fans." The second leg was announced on December 15, 2015. The second leg of the tour was announced in December 2014. In May 2015, dates for the fall 2015 leg were announced.

== Opening acts ==
1st leg

- Brett Eldredge
- Brothers Osborne

2nd leg

- Chris Stapleton

Europe leg

- The Shires

3rd leg

- Chris Stapleton
- David Nail
- Ashley Monroe

4th leg

- The Band Perry
- Cam
- The Big Fire
- David Nail
- The Shires
- Drake White
- Holly Williams

== Setlist ==
North America Leg 1

November 8-December 13, 2014

1. "Day Drinking"
2. "Quit Breaking Up With Me"
3. "Front Porch Thing"
4. "Bring It on Home"
5. "Tumble and Fall"
6. "Pain Killer"
7. "Girl Crush"
8. "Faster Gun"
9. "Little White Church"
10. "Sober"
11. "I'm With the Band"
12. "Good People"
13. "Front Porch Thing"
14. "Liza Jane" (Vince Gill cover, performed with Brett Eldredge & Brothers Osborne)
15. "Your Side of the Bed"
16. "Stay All Night"
17. "Save Your Sin"
18. "Things You Don't Think About"
19. "The Chain" (Fleetwood Mac cover)
20. "Tornado"
21. "Pontoon"

Encore

22. "Turn the Lights On"
23. "Boondocks"
- "Santa Claus Is Back in Town" (Elvis Presley cover, performed in Rockford, Illinois)
Europe

Songs not performed in the same order every night

1. "Turn the Lights On"
2. "Day Drinking"
3. "Quit Breaking Up with Me"
4. "Front Porch Thing"
5. "On Fire Tonight"
6. "Bring It on Home"
7. "Tumble and Fall"
8. "Good People"
9. "I'm With the Band"
10. "Pain Killer"
11. "Girl Crush"
12. "Faster Gun"
13. "Leavin' In Your Eyes"
14. "Little White Church"
15. "Sober"
16. "Live Forever"
17. "Things You Don't Think About"
18. "The Chain" (Fleetwood Mac cover)
19. "Stay All Night"
20. "Save Your Sin"
21. "Tornado"
22. "Pontoon"

Encore

23. "Boondocks"
North America Leg 2

March 5–28, 2015

1. "Day Drinking"
2. "Quit Breaking Up With Me"
3. "Front Porch Thing"
4. "Bring It on Home"
5. "Tumble and Fall"
6. "Pain Killer"
7. "Girl Crush"
8. "Faster Gun"
9. "Little White Church"
10. "Sober"
11. "I'm With the Band"
12. "Good People"
13. "Night Owl"
14. "Jolene" (Dolly Parton cover)
15. "Save Your Sin"
16. "Stay All Night"
17. "The Chain" (Fleetwood Mac cover)
18. "Tornado"
19. "Pontoon"

Encore

20. "Turn the Lights Out"
21. "Boondocks"
22. "The Beginning"

== Tour dates ==
Date	City	Country	Venue	Opening acts
North America Leg 1
November 8, 2014	Youngstown	United States	Covelli Centre	Brett Eldredge; Brothers Osborne
November 9, 2014	Highland Heights	United States	The Bank of Kentucky Center	Brett Eldredge; Brothers Osborne
November 13, 2014	Roanoke	United States	Salem Civic Center	Brett Eldredge; Brothers Osborne
November 14, 2014	Knoxville	United States	Knoxville Civic Auditorium and Coliseum	Brett Eldredge; Brothers Osborne
November 15, 2014	Atlanta	United States	Fox Theatre	Brett Eldredge; Brothers Osborne
November 20, 2014	Broomfield	United States	1stBank Center	Brett Eldredge; Brothers Osborne
November 21, 2014	Park City	United States	Hartman Arena	Brett Eldredge; Brothers Osborne
November 22, 2014	Grand Prairie	United States	Verizon Theatre	Brett Eldredge; Brothers Osborne
December 4, 2014	Detroit	United States	Masonic Temple	Brett Eldredge; Brothers Osborne
December 5, 2014	Rosemont	United States	Rosemont Theatre	Brett Eldredge; Brothers Osborne
December 6, 2014	Mount Pleasant	United States	Soaring Eagle Casino & Resort	Brett Eldredge; Brothers Osborne
December 12, 2014	Rochester	United States	Mayo Civic Center	Brett Eldredge; Brothers Osborne
December 13, 2014	Rockford	United States	BMO Harris Bank Center	Brett Eldredge; Brothers Osborne
Europe
February 10, 2015	London	England	O_{2} Shepherd's Bush Empire	The Shires
February 11, 2015	Manchester	England	The Ritz	The Shires
North America Leg 2
March 5, 2015	Savannah	United States	Johnny Mercer Theatre	Chris Stapleton
March 6, 2015	Birmingham	United States	BJCC Concert Hall	Chris Stapleton
March 8, 2015	Chattanooga	United States	Soldiers and Sailors Memorial Auditorium	Chris Stapleton
March 12, 2015	Evansville	United States	Aiken Theatre	Chris Stapleton
March 13, 2015	Louisville	United States	The Louisville Palace	Chris Stapleton
March 14, 2015	Muncie	United States	Emens Auditorium	Chris Stapleton
March 19, 2015	Davenport	United States	Adler Theatre	Chris Stapleton
March 20, 2015	St. Louis	United States	Fabulous Fox Theatre	Chris Stapleton
March 26, 2015	Duluth	United States	AMSOIL Arena	Chris Stapleton
March 27, 2015	Sioux City	United States	Orpheum Theatre	Chris Stapleton
March 28, 2015	Enid	United States	Enid Event Center	Chris Stapleton
North America Leg 3
June 23, 2015	Paso Robles	United States	Vina Robles Amphitheatre	David Nail; Ashley Monroe
June 24, 2015 ^{[A]}	Del Mar	United States	Del Mar Fairgrounds	Chris Stapleton
June 26, 2015	Las Vegas	United States	The Joint	David Nail; Ashley Monroe
June 27, 2015	Albuquerque	United States	Sandia Casino Amphitheater	Chris Stapleton
July 10, 2015	Council Bluffs	United States	Stir Concert Cove	Chris Stapleton; David Nail; Ashley Monroe
July 11, 2015	Hinckley	United States	Grand Casino Hinckley Amphitheater	Chris Stapleton
August 1, 2015	St. Leonard	United States	St. Leonard Fire Volunteer Fire Department	David Nail; Ashley Monroe
August 14, 2015	Verona	United States	Turning Stone Resort & Casino Event Center	David Nail
August 30, 2015	Little Rock	United States	First Security Amphitheatre	—N/a
September 2, 2015 ^{[B]}	Allentown	United States	Great Allentown Fair	Ashley Monroe
September 4, 2015	Boston	United States	Blue Hills Bank Pavilion	David Nail
North America Leg 4
October 8, 2015	Bemidiji	United States	Sanford Center	Drake White; Cam; The Big Fire
October 9, 2015	Ames	United States	Stephens Auditorium	Drake White; Cam; The Big Fire
October 10, 2015	Milwaukee	United States	Riverside Theater	Drake White; Cam; The Big Fire
October 15, 2015	Greensboro	United States	Greensboro Coliseum	Drake White; The Big Fire
October 16, 2015	Greenville	United States	Bon Secours Wellness Arena	Drake White; The Big Fire
October 17, 2015	St. Augustine	United States	St. Augustine Amphitheatre	Drake White; The Big Fire
October 22, 2015	Bismarck	United States	Bismarck Events Center	Drake White; The Big Fire
October 23, 2015	Rapid City	United States	Barnett Arena	Drake White; The Big Fire
October 24, 2015	Brookings	United States	Swiftel Arena	Drake White; The Big Fire
October 30, 2015	Bloomington	United States	U.S. Cellular Coliseum	Drake White; The Big Fire
November 12, 2015	Missoula	United States	Adams Center	Drake White; The Big Fire
November 13, 2015	Boise	United States	Taco Bell Arena	The Shires
November 14, 2015	Portland	United States	Keller Auditorium	Holly Williams
November 17, 2015	Kelowna	Canada	Prospera Place	The Shires
November 19, 2015	Abbotsford	Canada	Abbotsford Centre	The Shires
November 20, 2015	Seattle	United States	Paramount Theatre	
November 21, 2015	Spokane	United States	INB Performing Arts Center	

List of fairs
^{A} This concert is a part of the Del Mar Fair.
^{B} This concert is a part of the Great Allentown Fair.

=== Box office ===
Venue	City	Attendance	Revenue
Roanoke Civic Center	Roanoke	3,469	—N/a
Bank of New Hampshire Pavilion	Gilford	6,513 / 7,611	$224,166
