= It's a Dying Art =

Studio album by Little Big Town
- Released: August 28, 2026
- Recorded: 2025–2026
- Length: 48:56
- Label: MCA Nashville
- Producers: Karen Fairchild; Gena Johnson

Little Big Town chronology
The Christmas Record (2024)	It's a Dying Art (2026)

Singles from It's a Dying Art
- 1. "Hey There Sunshine" Released: May 15, 2026

It's a Dying Art is the twelfth studio album by American country music quartet Little Big Town. It was released on August 28, 2026, by MCA Nashville. It was their first release under the label, and is their first album of non-holiday music since Mr. Sun (2022). The album was produced by Gena Johnson and band member Karen Fairchild and was preceded by the single "Hey There Sunshine". It includes collaborations with Ashley Monroe, Jason Isbell, and Kelsea Ballerini, and is the first time a Little Big Town album has included featured artists.

== Background ==
Little Big Town released their tenth album, The Christmas Record, a collection of holiday covers and original Christmas songs, on October 4, 2024.

The album was announced on May 28, 2026. Of the title, Karen Fairchild stated, "we were thinking about relationships that everyone in the room had and how hard you have to work to keep enduring love going. Those things seem to be a dying art these days," with Kimberley Schlapman and Jimi Westbrook adding that they were inspired by loss of human connection in light of society's reliance on technology and concerns around artificial intelligence in music.

Karen Fairchild and Gena Johnson first met while co-producing Consequences of the Crown, the 2024 album by Shelby Lynne and developed a strong working relationship during the making of that album. Fairchild stated that Little Big Town were motivated to tap into something human for It's A Dying Art and that she felt Johnson was well-suited to capturing the nuances of the band's voices and harmonies. Of the project's direction, Fairchild noted that the band "would talk about things that we thought were really impactful moments on prior Little Big Town records, and the reasons why those things worked". Of her collaboration with Johnson, Fairchild explained, "I knew that the band was gonna fall in love with Gena ’cause she’s such a light, and she’s such a force, and so incredibly gifted and knowledgeable. I just knew that was gonna be a good fit. Production is about a viewpoint, and an opinion, and it’s about nitty-gritty details. I love that stuff, and it just so happened that I would be in the studio late nights with Gena. I’m so proud of the way this record sounds, the way it looks and the way it turned out. It really does celebrate real music made by real people. It’s not a perfect body of work by any means, but we wouldn’t want it that way. I think the flaws are where the beauty lies."

The band stated that they hadn't originally intended to make a follow-up album so quickly following the release of both The Christmas Record and their 25th anniversary Greatest Hits album in 2024, with Fairchild expressing that they were struggling with burnout and were "just writing to write and not really thinking about a record in the beginning", and Schlapman adding that they "didn't want to make a commitment" to making a new album at the time. As a collection of songs began to accumulate, the band booked a handful of recording sessions with Johnson which Philip Sweet described as "an appetizer" which offered a "fresh perspective" and encouraged them to continue booking more sessions and recording what would eventually become It's A Dying Art. Westbrook noted that this made the project different from the band's previous eleven albums as "we didn’t have as a whole a group of songs" in mind from the album at the beginning and that "working with Gena behind the board and the vocal sounds that she gets was so inspiring and a definitely a catalyst for the spirit of this record".

== Track listing ==
It's a Dying Art track listing
No.	Title	Writer(s)	Length
1.	"Intro"	Karen Fairchild; Shelby Lynne; Ashley Monroe	0:28
2.	"Sucker for a Sad Song" (with Ashley Monroe)	Fairchild; Lynne; Monroe	5:45
3.	"The Door" (with Jason Isbell)	Clint Daniels; Ken Hart; Waylon Payne	2:41
4.	"Dying Art"	Fairchild; Ashley Ray; Jonnie Simpson; Madi Yanofsky	5:42
5.	"Hey There Sunshine"	Hillary Lindsey; Jon Nite; Gordie Sampson	3:56
6.	"Over and Over"	Fairchild; Ray; Simpson; Yanofsky	4:38
7.	"The Idea"	Tofer Brown; Lauren Hungate; Liz Rose	3:27
8.	"We Could Have It All"	Fairchild; Monroe; Jimi Westbrook	3:56
9.	"Crickets"	Adam Hood; Philip Sweet; Westbrook	4:08
10.	"Closing Time" (with Kelsea Ballerini)	Kelsea Ballerini; Jessie Jo Dillon; Fairchild; Lindsey; Alysa Vanderheym	2:38
11.	"Long Way to Your Heart"	Fairchild; Lindsey; Lori McKenna; Rose	4:25
12.	"It's Coming Around"	Madi Diaz; Fairchild; Sean McConnell	3:25
13.	"Jet Plane"	Joe Ginsberg; Ray; Westbrook	3:49
Total length:			48:56

== Personnel ==
Credits are adapted from Tidal.

=== Little Big Town ===
- Karen Fairchild – vocals, production (all tracks); handclaps (track 2)
- Kimberly Schlapman – vocals (all tracks), handclaps (2)
- Phillip Sweet – vocals (all tracks), handclaps (2), acoustic guitar (13)
- Jimi Westbrook – vocals (all tracks), handclaps (2)

=== Additional contributors ===
- Gena Johnson – production, engineering, mixing, digital editing
- Joanna Finley – engineering assistance
- Pete Lyman – mastering
- Daniel Bacigalupi – mastering assistance
- Alyson McAnally – production coordination
- Audley Freed – electric guitar (2, 5, 8, 9, 12, 13), acoustic guitar (4, 5, 13)
- Tim Galloway – acoustic guitar (2, 4)
- JT Cure – bass guitar (2, 4)
- Billy Justineau – Hammond B3, Wurlitzer electric piano (2); piano (5)
- Chad Gamble – drums, percussion (2)
- Ashley Monroe – vocals, handclaps (2)
- Jason Isbell – acoustic guitar, slide guitar (3)
- Fred Eltringham – drums, percussion (4, 6, 8–12); handclaps (6), congas (12)
- Eleonore Denig – string arrangement, viola, violin (5)
- Cara Fox – string arrangement, cello (5)
- Todd Lombardo – acoustic guitar (6–12), guitar (12)
- Jen Gunderman – piano (6, 8, 11), Mellotron (8); Clavinet, synthesizer (9); Hammond B3, Wurlitzer electric piano (10, 12); celesta (11)
- Andrew Petroff – bass guitar (6, 8–12)
- Kelsea Ballerini – vocals (10)

== Charts ==
Chart performance for It's a Dying Art
Chart (2026)	Peak position
Scottish Albums (Official Charts)	97
UK Album Downloads (Official Charts)	50
UK Americana Albums (Official Charts)	17
UK Country Albums (Official Charts)	8
US Top Album Sales (Billboard)	26
