= A Little More You =

Single by Little Big Town

from the album The Road to Here
- Released: February 19, 2007
- Genre: Country
- Length: 4:25
- Label: Equity
- Songwriters: Karen Fairchild; Kimberly Schlapman; Phillip Sweet; Jimi Westbrook; Wayne Kirkpatrick
- Producers: Wayne Kirkpatrick; Little Big Town

Little Big Town singles chronology
"Good as Gone" (2006)	"A Little More You" (2007)	"I'm with the Band" (2007)

"A Little More You" is a song co-written and recorded by American country music group Little Big Town. It was released in February 2007 as the fourth single from their album The Road to Here. The song was written by group members Karen Fairchild, Kimberly Schlapman, Phillip Sweet and Jimi Westbrook with Wayne Kirkpatrick.

== Critical reception ==
Kevin John Coyne of Country Universe gave the song a 'B' grade, writing that it "sounds much cleaner" than their previous singles and "the harmonies are given a chance to really shine."

== Music video ==
The music video was directed by Roger Pistole and premiered in April 2007. It was filmed in Guanacaste, Costa Rica. It features the quartet performing the song in a jungle setting, and various young people hanging out in the same understory, as well as swimming, jumping off a rope, and hanging out by a river at night along with the band.

== Chart performance ==
The song debuted at number 53 on the U.S. Billboard Hot Country Songs chart for the week of March 3, 2007.

Chart (2007)	Peak position
US Hot Country Songs (Billboard)	20
US Bubbling Under Hot 100 (Billboard)	1
