= Lord willing =

"Lord willing" is a traditional English phrase related to a verse in the Epistle of James:

James 4:15 "You should say, "If the Lord wills, we shall live and do this or that.""

Lord Willing may also refer to:

- Lord Willin', album by Virginia hip-hop duo Clipse
- "Lord Willing", song by Manchild
- "Good Lord Willing", song by Little Big Town from A Place to Land
- "If the Good Lord's Willing and the Creek Don't Rise", song by Jerry Reed, sung by Johnny Cash
- "Amukiriki (The Lord Willing)", single by Les Paul & Mary Ford (1955)

== See also ==
- God willing (disambiguation)
- Deo volente
- Inshallah
