= Boondocks (song) =

Song co-written and recorded by American country music group Little Big Town

Single by Little Big Town

from the album The Road to Here
- Released: May 2, 2005
- Recorded: 2005
- Genre: Country
- Length: 4:32 (album version); 3:59 (radio single)
- Label: Equity
- Songwriters: Karen Fairchild; Kimberly Schlapman; Phillip Sweet; Jimi Westbrook; Wayne Kirkpatrick
- Producers: Wayne Kirkpatrick; Little Big Town

Little Big Town singles chronology
"Everything Changes" (2002)	"Boondocks" (2005)	"Bring It On Home" (2006)

Music video
- "Boondocks" at CMT.com

"Boondocks" is a song co-written and recorded by American country music group Little Big Town. It was released in May 2005 as the first single from their second studio album The Road to Here. It became their first Top 10 hit on the U.S. Billboard Hot Country Songs charts. It was written by Karen Fairchild, Kimberly Schlapman, Phillip Sweet, Jimi Westbrook and Wayne Kirkpatrick. The song is one of the band's most enduring and popular hits and they often perform it at the end of their concerts.

== Background and writing ==
Originally, the song was titled "Waiting For the Sun to Go Down". According to Karen Fairchild, one of the group's members, "When we wrote it, it just wasn't there... We kind of set it aside for a few days and then Wayne [Kirkpatrick, one of the song's co-writers] came back." The group later decided on turning the song into a Southern anthem, at which point Kirkpatrick suggested "I'm born and raised in the boondocks." (The line "waiting for the sun to go down" was transferred to "Bones", another song on the band's album.)

== Content ==
"Boondocks" is an up-tempo song whose main theme is of rural pride ("I feel no shame, I'm proud of where I came from / I was born and raised in the boondocks"). In the song, all four of the group's members trade off lead and harmony vocals, with all four members singing in various combinations throughout.

== Music video ==
A music video, directed by Roger Pistole, was released for the song. The music video was filmed in Watertown, Tennessee.

== Chart performance ==
"Boondocks" debuted at #59 on the U.S. Billboard Hot Country Songs for the week of June 4, 2005; it eventually peaked at #9. On the Billboard Hot 100, the single peaked at #46, becoming their first single to appear on the chart.

Chart (2005–2006)	Peak position
US Billboard Hot 100	46
US Hot Country Songs (Billboard)	9

== Certifications ==
Region	Certification	Certified units/sales
United States (RIAA)	2× Platinum	2,000,000^{‡}
^{‡} Sales+streaming figures based on certification alone.
