= God willing =

God willing is a phrase that could mean:

- "If the Lord wills", an expression found in James 4 in the Christian Bible.
- Deo volente, Latin phrase signed at the end of a letter wishing for the safe arrival of the letter
- Insha'Allah, Arabic phrase used when referring to future events
- God Willing (2006 film), 2006 Swedish film
- God Willing (2015 film), 2015 Italian film
- God Willing (soundtrack), soundtrack to the 2006 Swedish film
- God Will'n, mixtape by American rapper Juelz Santana
- "God Willing", a song by Lowgold from Keep Music Miserable
- "God Willing", a song by Pet Shop Boys from Fundamental
