= Little White Church =

Single by Little Big Town

from the album The Reason Why
- Released: March 8, 2010
- Genre: Country
- Length: 3:06
- Label: Capitol Nashville
- Songwriters: Karen Fairchild; Wayne Kirkpatrick; Kimberly Schlapman; Phillip Sweet; Jimi Westbrook
- Producers: Wayne Kirkpatrick; Little Big Town

Little Big Town singles chronology
"Good Lord Willing" (2008)	"Little White Church" (2010)	"Kiss Goodbye" (2010)

Music video
- "Little White Church" at CMT.com

"Little White Church" is a song co-written and recorded by American country music band Little Big Town, written by the band along with Wayne Kirkpatrick. It was released in March 2010 as the lead-off single from their album The Reason Why, released on August 24, 2010.

== Content ==
"Little White Church" is an up-tempo country song, backed primarily by electric guitar, with a hand-clap during the pre-chorus. The song's female narrator confronts her love interest, telling him that he's not welcome anymore unless he "take[s her] down to the little white church" and marries her. Band member Karen Fairchild performs lead vocals for the song.

== Critical reception ==
Juli Thanki of Engine 145 gave the song a thumbs up, describing it as something that stands out "when so many singles on the radio sound the same." She also noted that in a "time of year when an infectious, upbeat hit ushers in spring after a dreary winter," this song "fits the bill perfectly." Kevin John Coyne of Country Universe gave the song an A− rating, favoring the groups' harmonies and the instrumentation. He concluded that with "a few more records like Laura Bell Bundy’s and this one, and country radio just might get interesting again." Bobby Peacock of Roughstock spoke positively of the song, favoring "the song's energetic performance and uncluttered production," although he felt the song's lyrics were "a bit simplistic in parts." Slant Magazine included the song in its "Best of 2010: Singles" chart, ranking the song at number fourteen, calling it "distinctive and seductive; one of the few bright spots on country radio this year."

== Music video ==
The music video, which was directed by Kristin Barlowe, premiered on CMT on June 1, 2010. The video begins with Karen Fairchild getting dressed up for her wedding before leaving her house and beginning to walk down a country road. She is soon joined by the rest of Little Big Town, and the group proceeds to the church. While she is on the way to the little white church, Fairchild's mother gags her fiance and ties him up. When the group arrives at the church, no one has seen her groom, and they exit the church. The group is then shown performing on stage with vintage microphones at an outdoor festival, while Fairchild's mother lifts up the trunk of a car, revealing the groom tied up inside, before handing off the keys to the band and allowing them to drive away.

== Chart performance ==
"Little White Church" debuted at number 48 on the U.S. Billboard Hot Country Songs chart for the week of March 20, 2010. It became the group's first Top 10 single since "Bring It On Home" in 2006, reaching a peak of number 6 for the week of October 9, 2010.

Chart (2010)	Peak position
US Hot Country Songs (Billboard)	6
US Billboard Hot 100	59

=== Year-end charts ===
Chart (2010)	Position
US Country Songs (Billboard)	23

== Certifications ==
Region	Certification	Certified units/sales
United States (RIAA)	Platinum	1,000,000^{‡}
^{‡} Sales+streaming figures based on certification alone.
