= Don't Waste My Time (Little Big Town song) =

Single by Little Big Town

from the album Little Big Town
- Released: February 11, 2002
- Genre: Country
- Length: 2:50
- Label: Monument
- Songwriters: Karen Fairchild; Kimberly Schlapman; Phillip Sweet; Jimi Westbrook; Irene Kelley; Clay Mills
- Producers: Little Big Town; Blake Chancey

Little Big Town singles chronology
"Don't Waste My Time" (2002)	"Everything Changes" (2002)

"Don't Waste My Time" is the debut song recorded by American country music group Little Big Town. It was released in February 2002 as the first single from the album Little Big Town. The song reached #33 on the Billboard Hot Country Singles & Tracks chart. The song was written by all four members of the group, along with Irene Kelley and Clay Mills.

== Chart performance ==
Chart (2002)	Peak position
US Hot Country Songs (Billboard)	33
