= The Reason Why =

Studio album by Little Big Town
- Released: August 24, 2010
- Genre: Country
- Length: 45:55
- Label: Capitol Nashville
- Producers: Wayne Kirkpatrick; Little Big Town

Little Big Town chronology
A Place to Land (2007)	The Reason Why (2010)	Tornado (2012)

Singles from The Reason Why
- 1. "Little White Church" Released: March 8, 2010; 2. "Kiss Goodbye" Released: October 18, 2010; 3. "The Reason Why" Released: March 7, 2011

The Reason Why is the fourth studio album by American country music group Little Big Town. It was released on August 24, 2010, through Capitol Records Nashville. "Little White Church," which was released in March 2010 as the album's lead-off single, has since become a Top 10 hit on the U.S. Billboard Hot Country Songs chart.

== Content ==
The album's title track was released as a digital single on July 27, 2010, to begin an iTunes countdown to the album release on August 24, 2010. Three further digital singles — "Kiss Goodbye," "Why, Oh Why," and "All the Way Down" — were released weekly leading up until the album release. "Little White Church," the album's first single release to radio, was a Top 10 on the Hot Country Songs charts, with a peak of number 6. "Rain on a Tin Roof," written by Chris Stapleton and Trent Willmon, previously appeared on Julie Roberts's 2004 self-titled debut album. "Kiss Goodbye" and the title track were released as the album's second and third singles, respectively; both reached a peak of number 42 on the Hot Country Songs chart.

== Critical reception ==
Professional ratings
Review scores
Source	Rating
Mojo Radio	(8.7/10)
American Twang	3.5/5 stars
Allmusic	4/5 stars
Country Weekly	3.5/5 stars
Slant	4/5 stars

The Reason Why received primarily positive reviews from music critics. Giving it four stars out of five, Jonathan Keefe of Slant Magazine thought that it was the band's most consistent album, praising the vocal harmonies as well as the cuts on which Karen Fairchild sang lead. He also thought that the band's sound was less derivative of Fleetwood Mac on this album than on previous works. Jessica Phillips of Country Weekly rated it three-and-a-half stars out of five, saying that the group had "renewed energy" on it, also highlighting Fairchild's lead vocals. Both Keefe and Phillips compared "Little White Church" favorably to Little Big Town's 2005 single "Boondocks." Thom Jurek of Allmusic also thought that the album showed a growth in sound over the band's two albums for Equity Music Group, giving it four stars out of five. Jim Malec of American Twang thought the group’s vocal arrangements were "overbearing and gimmicky," claiming that the album often "sounds like the soundtrack to a Broadway musical." However, he complimented the group member's individual voices, in particular Karen Fairchild's.

== Track listing ==
No.	Title	Writer(s)	Lead vocals	Length
1.	"The Reason Why"	Karen Fairchild, Kimberly Schlapman, Phillip Sweet, Jimi Westbrook, Wayne Kirkpatrick	Fairchild, Westbrook	4:52
2.	"Runaway Train"	Westbrook	Westbrook	3:45
3.	"Kiss Goodbye"	Hillary Lindsey; Gordie Sampson; Steve McEwan	Sweet	4:02
4.	"Shut Up Train"	Lindsey; Chris Tompkins; Luke Laird	Fairchild	3:48
5.	"Why, Oh Why"	Fairchild; Schlapman; Westbrook; Jonathan Singleton; Chris Stapleton	Schlapman	3:45
6.	"Little White Church"	Fairchild; Schlapman; Westbrook; Sweet; Kirkpatrick	Fairchild	3:06
7.	"You Can't Have Everything"	Fairchild; Schlapman; Westbrook; Sweet; Kirkpatrick	Schlapman	3:28
8.	"All the Way Down"	Fairchild; Schlapman; Westbrook; Sweet; Kirkpatrick	Fairchild	3:08
9.	"All Over Again"	Fairchild; Schlapman; Westbrook; Sweet; Kirkpatrick	Sweet	4:08
10.	"Rain on a Tin Roof"	Stapleton; Trent Willmon	Westbrook	4:24
11.	"Life Rolls On"	Fairchild; Schlapman; Westbrook; Sweet; Kirkpatrick	Westbrook; Sweet	3:10
12.	"Lean Into It"	Fairchild; Schlapman; Westbrook; Sweet; Kirkpatrick	Sweet	4:19
Total length:				45:55

== Personnel ==
=== Little Big Town ===
- Karen Fairchild - vocals, tambourine
- Kimberly Schlapman - vocals, tambourine
- Phillip Sweet - vocals, piano, electric guitar
- Jimi Westbrook - vocals, acoustic guitar

=== Additional musicians ===
- J.T. Corenflos - 12-string electric guitar, electric guitar
- Steve Dale - bass guitar
- Dan Dugmore - pedal steel guitar
- Shannon Forrest - drums, tambourine
- Greg Hagan - electric guitar
- Jedd Hughes - acoustic guitar, electric guitar, mandolin
- Jay Joyce - electric guitar
- Gordon Kennedy - electric guitar
- Wayne Kirkpatrick - banjar, 12-string acoustic guitar, acoustic guitar, tenor guitar, hi-string guitar, national steel guitar, piano, shaker
- Phil Madeira - Hammond B-3 organ
- Chris McHugh - drums
- Jeffery Roach - keyboards
- Caleb Sherman - steel guitar
- Adam Shoenfeld - electric slide guitar, electric guitar
- Steve Sinatra - drums
- Jimmie Lee Sloas - bass guitar

== Chart performance ==
=== Album ===
The Reason Why debuted at number 5 on the U.S. Billboard 200 and became their first number 1 record on the U.S. Billboard Country Albums charts, with first week sales of 41,939. As of the chart date January 8, 2011, the album has sold 150,298 copies in the U.S.

=== Weekly charts ===
Chart (2010)	Peak position
US Billboard 200	5
US Top Country Albums (Billboard)	1

=== Year-end charts ===
Chart (2010)	Position
US Top Country Albums (Billboard)	50
Chart (2011)	Position
US Top Country Albums (Billboard)	70
