= Georgia Governor's Honors Program =

Summer educational program in the state of Georgia

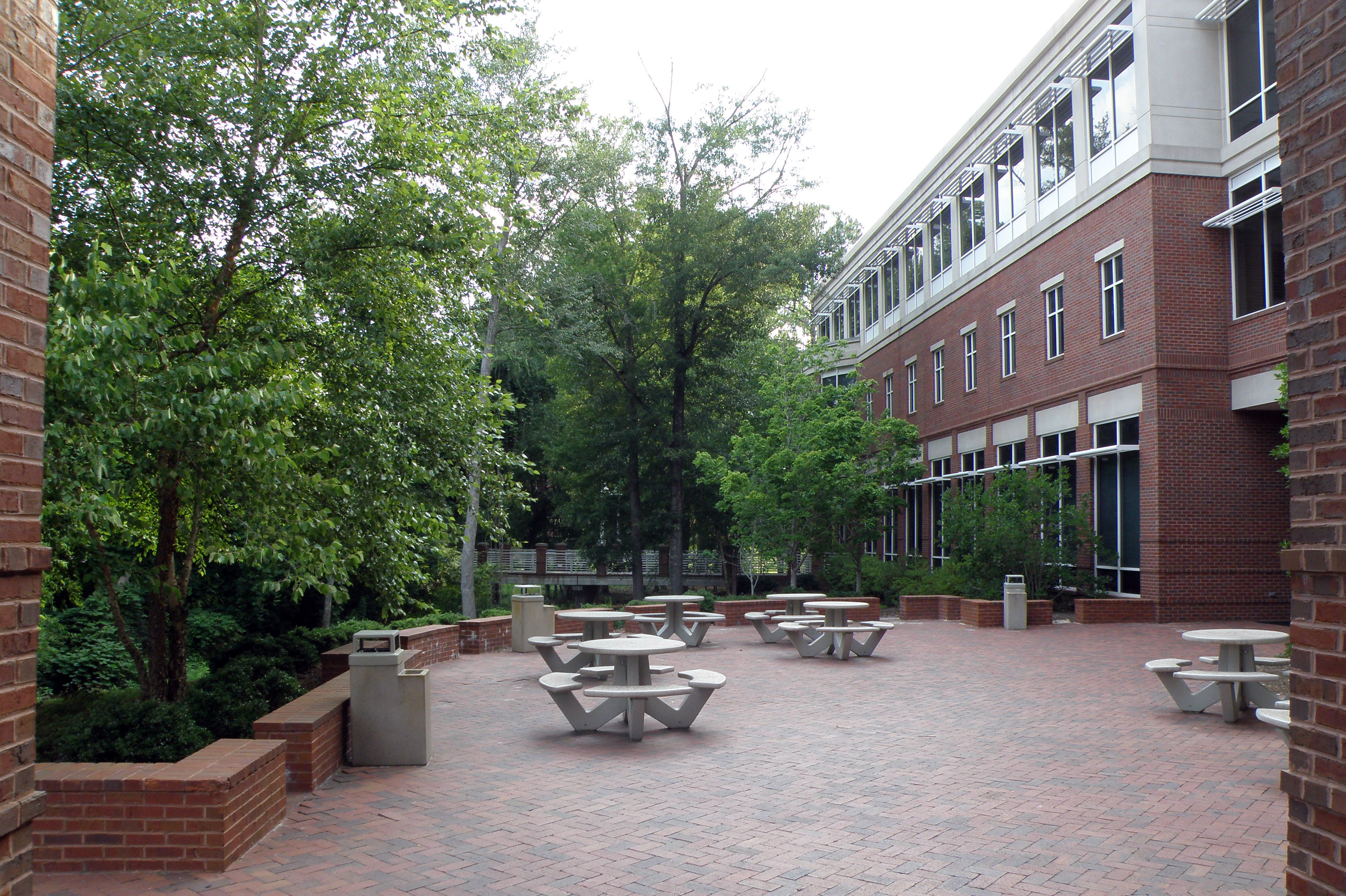
Georgia Southern University's Coca-Cola Plaza behind COBA

The Georgia Governor's Honors Program (commonly referred to as "GHP") is a summer educational program in the state of Georgia, in the United States. It is a four-week (formerly six-week prior to 2011, and originally eight-week) summer instructional program for intellectually gifted and artistically talented high school students of Georgia.

Rising juniors and seniors in Georgia's public and private high schools may be nominated for the free program by their teachers. The program's entire cost is covered by the state of Georgia. The Governor's Honors Program began in 1964 with 400 participants and was hosted at Wesleyan College. It first took place at Valdosta State University from 1980 through 2016 (sometimes cohosted at North Georgia College in Dahlonega), then was relocated to Berry College in Rome, Georgia from 2017 through 2022, and is now hosted at Georgia Southern University.

There is no cost to attend GHP for students. Tuition, room, and board are covered under appropriations made by the Georgia General Assembly. However, students are asked to bring basic school supplies (binders, notebook paper, notebooks, pens, etc.) for class. GHP is an ungraded summer program. Students are not required to take any exit exams or standardized tests regarding major courses of study. Credits are not issued for completion of the program. Students that complete the entire four weeks of study receive a certificate of completion.

== Nomination ==
Students are nominated in a specific instructional area in which their abilities, aptitudes, and interest lie. Each school system or private school is assigned a nomination quota based on the average daily attendance of its 10th and 11th grades. Transcripts of grades and records, nomination forms, endorsements and other pertinent information are submitted to substantiate the nominations. Selected nominees then submit written essays and/or videos of their work. Each district or county has a different nomination process. From there, selected applicants are sent to statewide screening interviews/auditions.

The written evidence and data gathered in the student interview/audition are used to rank nominees and select finalists.

The overall acceptance rate of the program in 2017 was around 21%. However, this does not include the large number of students who were eliminated in school and county rounds or were not nominated.

In 2017, 58% of GHP students were from metro area public schools, 32% of students were from non-metro area public schools, and 10% of students were from private schools or were home schooled.

== Instruction ==
Major instructional areas are communicative arts (English), Spanish, French, Latin, German, Mandarin Chinese, mathematics, science (biology, chemistry, and physics), agricultural science, social studies, visual arts, theatre performance, theatre design, music (woodwinds, piano, brass, strings, vocal, and percussion), dance, and engineering (design, electromechanical, and software). Staff in four support areas (Counseling, Fitness, Computers, and Library/Media) also work to assist the student body.

In 2017, the program hosted 450 students in academic major areas and 217 students in fine arts major areas. Among that student population were 72 world language majors, 75 communicative arts majors, 78 social studies majors, 225 STEM (Science, Technology, Engineering, and Mathematics) majors, 32 dance majors, 35 theatre majors, 46 visual arts majors, and 104 music majors.

Students may choose an elective in the first week of the program. The electives are commonly known as minors and include all the major areas of study along with others including Journalism, Counseling, Education, Ballroom dancing, Gender Studies, and Songwriting.

Each student receives 4.5 hours of major subject time on Mondays to Saturdays and 2 hours of elective subject time on Mondays to Fridays. Other time is free for meals, research, performances, practice, or seminars (see below).

GHP instructors are chosen according to their experience and recommendations. The student to teacher ratio is mandated to be at or very close to 15:1. In 2017, the student to faculty ratio was 13:1.

== Seminars ==
Residential Advisors and faculty host seminars outside of instructional time, ranging from learning Hebrew, learning how to make impromptu presentations, or making friendship bracelets.

== Notable alumni ==
The following are notable alumni of the Georgia Governor's Honors Program, listed with their GHP major, year of attendance, and notable accomplishments:

Name	GHP Major	Year	Notable Accomplishments
Brad Strickland	Mathematics	1964	Novelist and writer, university professor
Lane Davies	Drama	1967	stage, film, and TV actor—best known as Mason Capwell from "Santa Barbara"
Joseph Searle	Music	1968	educator; GHP director, 1996-2010
Dale Lyles	Visual Arts	1970	educator; GHP asst. program director for instruction, 1997–2009; GHP director, 2011-2013
Wayne Knight	Theatre	1971	stage, film, and TV actor
Wendi Bryan Carpenter	Science	1973	31st woman designated as a Naval aviator; 1st woman Navy pilot promoted to rank of Rear Admiral; 10th President of SUNY Maritime College
Randy Evans	Mathematics	1975	Advisor to Newt Gingrich
Christopher David Sarzen	Music	1977	Concert Pianist, Physician
Linda Griffith	English	1977	biological engineer
Jeff Greenstein	Science	1979	television writer and producer
Robert Duncan McNeill	Theatre	1980	Actor "All My Children" and "Star Trek Voyager"
Carl Sweat	Social Studies	1981	President and General Manager, FUZE Division of The Coca-Cola Company, SVP Global Beverage, Starbucks; Awarded Gold Effie for Advertising Effectiveness by American Marketing Association
Wycliffe Gordon	Music	1983	Prolific jazz trombonist
Zahra Karinshak	Social Studies	1984	Lawyer; Georgia State Senator; 1st Iranian American elected to Georgia legislature
Carrie Preston	Theatre	1984	actor, star of ["Elsbeth"]
Kimberly Schlapman	Voice	1986	Singer and co-founder of Little Big Town; multi Grammy winner; cooking show host; author
Michael Hester	Comm Arts	1987	educator; 3-time coach of debate national champions; board member of JADE (Jamaican Assoc for Debating & Empowerment)
Hunter Bell	Theatre	1988	Author and star of broadway musical [Title of Show]
Antoine Kearney	Voice	1989	Baritone, 2013 Executive, Higher Education Services
Carla Wong McMillian	Social Studies	1990	Court of Appeals of Georgia; 1st Asian American elected statewide in Georgia
Jack McBrayer	Theatre	1990	film and TV actor
Joe Gebbia	Visual Arts	1998	billionaire; Cofounder of Airbnb
Jamie Barton	Voice	1999	Mezzo-soprano, 2013 BBC Cardiff Singer of the World competition winner
Donald Glover	Theatre	2000	TV actor/writer, rapper (as Childish Gambino), comedian
Matt Moore	Mathematics	2000	Chairman of the South Carolina Republican Party
Geoff Knorr	Music	2002	Composer and Recording Engineer
Tyler Harper	Agriscience and Biotechnology	2003	Georgia's Commissioner of Agriculture, elected in 2022. Former Georgia state senator (2013-2023).
Eve Carson	Social Studies	2003	Student Body President at UNC-Chapel Hill, murder victim
Carl Clemons-Hopkins	Voice	2004	Actor (Hacks (TV series)) and 2021 Primetime Emmy Awards nominee for Outstanding Supporting Actor in a Comedy
Alec Mau	Communicative Arts	2013	Broadcast Meteorologist
