= Little Big Town =

American country group

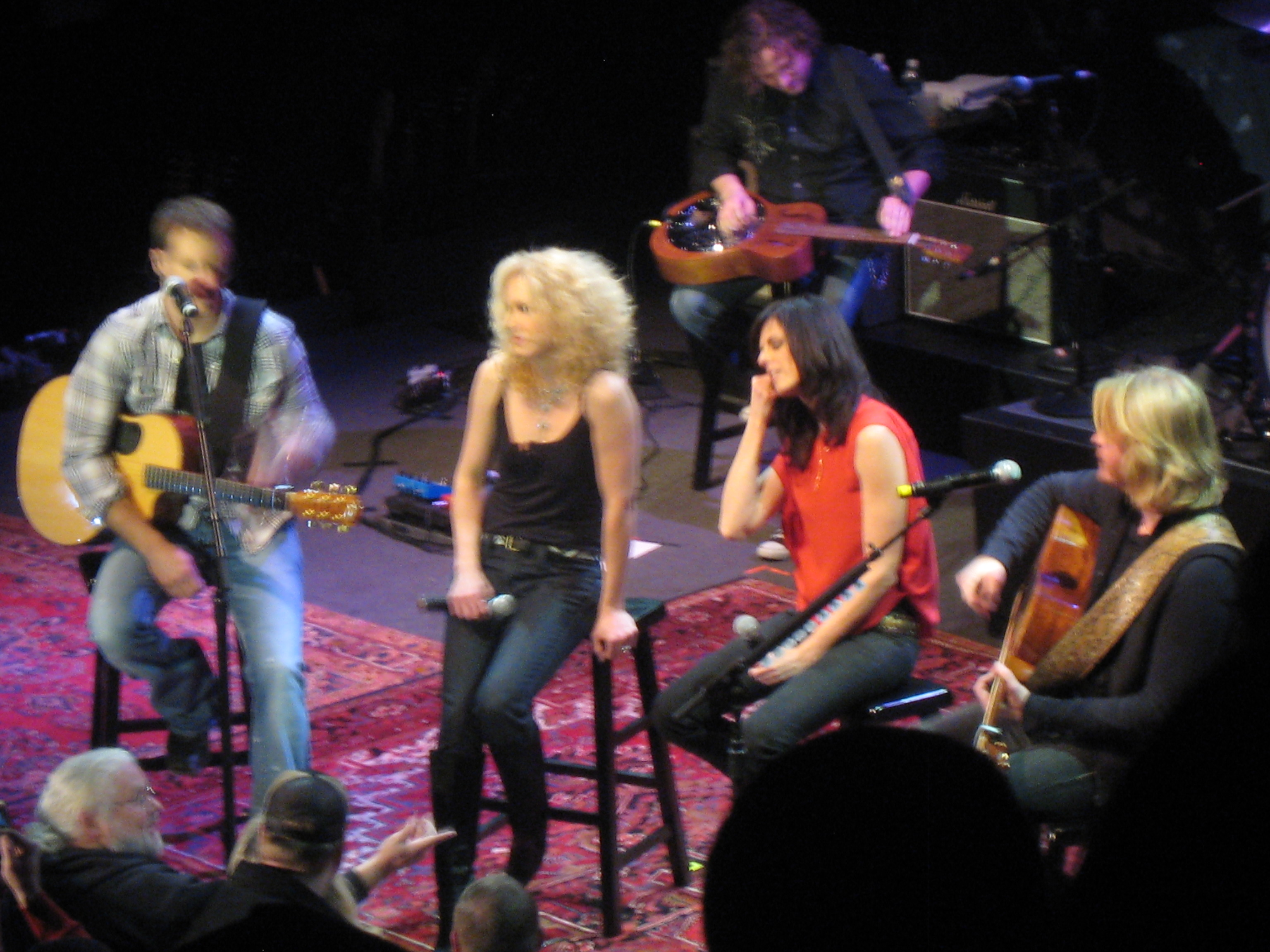
- Little Big Town performing in 2009

Background information
- Origin: Nashville, Tennessee, U.S.
- Genres: Country
- Works: Little Big Town discography
- Years active: 1998–present
- Labels: Mercury Nashville; Monument; Equity; Capitol Nashville
- Members: Karen Fairchild; Kimberly Schlapman; Phillip Sweet; Jimi Westbrook
- Website: littlebigtown.com

Little Big Town is an American country music vocal group from Nashville, Tennessee. Founded in 1998, the group has had the same four members since its founding: Karen Fairchild, Kimberly Schlapman (formerly Kimberly Roads), Phillip Sweet, and Jimi Westbrook. Fairchild and Westbrook have been married to each other since 2006. Little Big Town's musical style relies heavily on four-part vocal harmonies, with all four members alternating as lead vocalists.

After a recording deal with the Mercury Nashville Records label which produced no singles or albums, Little Big Town released its debut album Little Big Town on Monument Records in 2002. It produced two minor country chart singles before the group left the label. In 2005, the group signed to Equity Music Group, an independent record label owned by Clint Black. Their second album, The Road to Here, was released that year, and received a platinum certification from the Recording Industry Association of America (RIAA) and spawned their breakout single, "Boondocks." A Place to Land, their third album, was released via Equity, then re-released via Capitol Nashville after Equity closed in 2008. Seven more albums followed for Capitol: The Reason Why (2010), Tornado (2012), Pain Killer (2014), The Breaker (2017), Nightfall (2020), Mr. Sun (2022) and The Christmas Record (2024), four of which have reached number one on the Top Country Albums chart.

Their albums accounted for 24 singles on Hot Country Songs and Country Airplay, including the No. 1 singles "Pontoon", and "Better Man" along with the top 10 hits "Boondocks", "Bring It On Home", "Little White Church", "Tornado", "Day Drinking", and "Girl Crush".

== Early years ==
Fairchild and Schlapman met at Samford University in 1987, where they both sang in the school's vocal ensembles. In the mid-1990s, Fairchild sang with the Christian vocal group Truth and was featured as a lead singer in a few of their songs. She formed a duo called KarenLeigh with Leigh Cappillino, a member of Truth who joined the group Point of Grace. KarenLeigh produced the singles, "Save It for a Rainy Day" and "This Love Has". Fairchild and Schlapman both later moved to Nashville, Tennessee to pursue solo singing careers, where they reunited and decided to form a vocal group. Westbrook joined Schlapman and Fairchild in 1998, followed by Sweet.

== Career ==
=== 1998–2005: Little Big Town ===
Little Big Town's first record deal was with Mercury Nashville Records. The band was dropped from the label's roster without releasing a single or album. In 2001, they sang backing vocals on Collin Raye's album Can't Back Down, while Sweet and Roads co-wrote the song "Back Where I Belong" on Sherrié Austin's 2001 album Followin' a Feelin'.

In 2002, the band signed with Monument Records Nashville. The band released its first album, Little Big Town, in 2002. The album produced the singles "Don't Waste My Time" and "Everything Changes", which peaked at 33 and 42, respectively, on the Billboard Hot Country Songs chart. Little Big Town was left without a label when Monument Records dissolved its Nashville branch. After Westbrook's father died, and Fairchild and Sweet got divorces, the band members got outside jobs while they continued to tour.

=== 2005-2009: The Road to Here and A Place to Land ===
In 2005, Little Big Town was signed to Equity Music Group, a label started and partially owned by country music singer Clint Black. Their third single, "Boondocks", was released in June, peaking at No. 9 on the country charts in January 2006. It served as the first of four singles from the group's second album, The Road to Here, which was released on October 4, 2005. "Bring It On Home", the second single from the album, became Little Big Town's first top 5 hit on Hot Country Songs. It was followed by "Good as Gone" and "A Little More You", both of which were top 20 hits. By the end of 2006, The Road to Here had been certified Platinum in the United States. Unlike their first album, the group's members co-wrote the majority of the songs on The Road to Here along with Wayne Kirkpatrick, who also produced it. In 2007, the group sang backing vocals on John Mellencamp's Freedom's Road album.

Little Big Town released A Place to Land, their third studio album and second with Equity, on November 6, 2007. Its lead-off single, "I'm with the Band", peaked at number 32 on the country chart. On April 23, 2008, Little Big Town announced it was leaving Equity for Capitol Nashville. Shortly afterward, they charted with Sugarland and Jake Owen on a live cover of The Dream Academy's "Life in a Northern Town". Taken from Sugarland's 2007 tour, it reached number 28 on the country chart based on unsolicited airplay. In October 2008, Capitol re-released A Place to Land, which added four new songs, and the label promoted two further singles from the album, "Fine Line" and "Good Lord Willing".

In the fall of 2008, Little Big Town opened up for Carrie Underwood on her Carnival Ride Tour. They began their first headlining tour in January 2009 in Jacksonville, Florida and continued through April.

Fairchild recorded a duet with Mellencamp on his 2008 album, Life, Death, Love and Freedom. The song, "A Ride Back Home", was released as the album's third single and was accompanied by a music video. Fairchild also duetted with Mellencamp on "My Sweet Love" and appears in its music video.

Little Big Town was nominated for Vocal Group of the Year for the fourth year in a row at the 2009 CMA Awards.

=== 2010–2013: The Reason Why, commercial success, and Tornado ===
In March 2010, the group released a new single titled "Little White Church", as the lead-off single to their fourth studio album and first completely new album on Capitol Nashville, The Reason Why, which was released on August 24, 2010. "Little White Church" peaked at No. 6 on the country chart. The album produced two additional singles in "Kiss Goodbye" and the title track, but both failed to reach the top 40 of Hot Country Songs.

The album's title track was released as a digital single on July 27, 2010, to begin an iTunes countdown to the album release on August 24, 2010. Three further digital singles – "Kiss Goodbye", "Why, Oh Why", and "All the Way Down" – were released weekly leading up until the album release. Also, in promotion of The Reason Why, Little Big Town went on tour as an opening act for Sugarland on The Incredible Machine Tour, as well their own The Reason Why Tour.

Little Big Town's fifth studio album, Tornado, was released on September 11, 2012. It was also their first album to be produced by Jay Joyce. "Pontoon" was released as the album's lead single on April 30, 2012, and became their first number one hit on Hot Country Songs in September 2012. It was their first single to receive a Platinum certification. The title track was released as the album's second single on October 1, 2012. It reached No. 2 on the Country Airplay chart in 2013. At the 55th Grammy Awards, "Pontoon" won the Grammy Award for Best Country Duo/Group Performance. The album was certified gold by the RIAA in December 2012.

The band joined Rascal Flatts on their Changed Tour, along with Eli Young Band and Edens Edge, for dates spanning Summer 2012. They played at the C2C: Country to Country festival in London on March 16, 2013.

On August 31, 2013 the album's third single, "Your Side of the Bed" peaked at #29 on the Country Airplay charts.

The band sang background vocals on Ashley Monroe's 2013 single, "You Got Me", featured on her 2013 release, Like a Rose. Fairchild co-wrote the song with Monroe. However, it failed to appear on any major Billboard Music Charts.

The album's fourth single, "Sober" peaked at #27 on the Hot Country Songs chart on November 23, 2013.

=== 2014-2016: Pain Killer and Grand Ole Opry invitation ===
Little Big Town performed harmony vocals on David Nail's 2014 album, I'm a Fire, on the song "When They're Gone (Lyle County)", co-written by Brett Eldredge. They were featured on Miranda Lambert's 2014 album, Platinum, on "Smokin' and Drinkin'", a song which the band had considered recording. It debuted on Billboard's Country Airplay chart at No. 38 after their performance at the CMA Awards in 2014 and was released as a single in 2015.

The band began recording their sixth studio album, Pain Killer, in early 2014. The lead single, "Day Drinking", was released digitally June 3, and was sent to country radio on June 9. It debuted on the Country Airplay chart at No. 32, their highest-ever debut at the time, and went on to peak at No. 2 on Country Airplay. It hit No. 1 on the Canada Country chart, becoming their second No. 1 single and first as songwriters. Pain Killer's track listing was announced on July 14, and the album was released on October 21.

On October 3, 2014, Reba McEntire invited the group to join the Grand Ole Opry. They accepted and were inducted by Vince Gill on October 17.

The second single from the album, "Girl Crush", was released December 15, 2014. Some radio stations were reported to have pulled "Girl Crush" from their playlists, in response to concerns from listeners who interpreted the song's lyrics to be about lesbianism. The label created a commercial in which the band discussed the song and its meaning. Billboard consulted radio program directors on its panel and found one who detailed a specific complaint from a listener. The song became Little Big Town's second No. 1 on a Billboard chart in May 2015 and their highest showing on the Billboard Hot 100 after gaining exposure on "The Voice" and the 50th Annual ACM Awards. The album's third single and the title track, "Pain Killer", released to country radio on August 24, 2015.

On September 9, 2015, the group was nominated for five CMA Awards: Vocal Group of the Year, Album of the Year for Pain Killer, Single of the Year for "Girl Crush", Music Video of the Year for "Girl Crush" and Musical Event of the Year for their collaboration on the Miranda Lambert single "Smokin' and Drinkin'". They tied Eric Church for most nominations that year. The songwriters of "Girl Crush" were recognized with a Song of the Year win.

For the 58th Annual Grammy Awards Pain Killer was nominated for Best Country Album, "Girl Crush" was nominated for Best Country Duo/Group Performance, Song of the Year and Best Country Song. Little Big Town received nominations for Best Country Album and Best Country Duo/Group Performance.

On January 24, 2016, the band sang the National Anthem before the Arizona/Carolina NFC Championship Game. On July 4 of that year, they performed with the Boston Pops at their annual Independence Day concert.

=== 2016–2017: Wanderlust, The Breaker, and Ryman residency ===
In February 2016, they appeared on "Take Me Down", a track on Down to My Last Bad Habit, the fourteenth album by Vince Gill.

In March 2016, Little Big Town returned to the UK as part of the C2C: Country to Country tour, becoming one of four acts at the time (the others being Brantley Gilbert, Sam Hunt and Carrie Underwood) to perform at the festival twice. They headlined the launch party in 2015 where they announced the full line-up, revealing they would be supporting Underwood along with Hunt and Maddie & Tae.

On May 24, 2016, the band announced their seventh studio album titled Wanderlust. The album contains eight tracks produced by Pharrell Williams and was released on June 10, 2016. Fairchild describes the album as, "It's not a country album and it's not like anything we've ever done. It's fun to be spontaneous and put it out there to the fans, because we want to, and not to overthink it, but just because it has brought us a lot of joy, and we think it will for them as well. So why not? We're going with our gut and putting it out there. It's just music, you know?" Fairchild stated that they are also working on a country record with Jay Joyce. In July, they appeared on the 2000–2005 episode of ABC's Greatest Hits where they performed covers by Alicia Keys, Oasis and Sheryl Crow. They were also selected as one of 30 artists to perform on "Forever Country", a mash-up track of "Take Me Home, Country Roads", "On the Road Again" and "I Will Always Love You", which celebrates 50 years of the CMA Awards.

The band released "Better Man", which was written by singer-songwriter Taylor Swift, on October 20, 2016, as the lead single to their upcoming seventh studio album, The Breaker, that was released on February 24, 2017. Initially masking the song's writer, the band revealed that Swift wrote the song. The song's music video, directed by Reid Long and Becky Fluke, was released November 1, 2016. The band would follow up with singles "Happy People", their worst-charting single to date, and "When Someone Stops Loving You", a minor top 40 hit.

The band announced they would be the first act in history to have a residency at the Ryman Auditorium in Nashville. Little Big Town announced a six-date UK tour supported by Seth Ennis beginning on September 28 and concluding in London on October 5 before revealing that Kacey Musgraves and Midland would support them on the American leg of The Breakers Tour beginning in February 2018. On October 5 during their show at the Royal Albert Hall, the band revealed that they would be headlining the 2018 C2C: Country to Country festival, making history as the first act to play the event three times.

=== 2018–2022: Nightfall and Mr. Sun ===
"Summer Fever" was released as a stand-alone single on June 6, 2018. It debuted (and peaked) at number 29 on Country Airplay, becoming the band's highest debut to date. The song also peaked within the top 40 of Hot Country Songs and Canada Country charts.

The group then released "The Daughters" on April 5, 2019 as the first single from their ninth album Nightfall, which the band produced themselves. It was released on January 17, 2020. "The Daughters" debuted at number 29 on Hot Country Songs but was not promoted to radio and thus failed to chart on Country Airplay. On September 8, 2019, Little Big Town released "Over Drinking", the second single from Nightfall. The band embarked on a 30-date theatre tour of the same name with supporting act Caitlyn Smith, beginning with a show at New York City's Carnegie Hall the day before the album release.

On April 11, 2022, the band released the song "Hell Yeah". On July 19, the band announced their tenth studio album, Mr. Sun, which was released on September 16.

=== 2023–Present: Sugarland collaboration and The Christmas Record ===
In 2023, the group toured lightly, headlining the 10-date Friends of Mine tour, and opening for George Strait on his 2023 tour.

In March 2024, the group announced the UK leg of the Friends of Mine tour. Also in March, the group announced on social media that they would be collaborating with "lifelong friends" Sugarland at the 2024 CMT Music Awards. They performed Phil Collins' "Take Me Home", which was released as single the same day. The two groups will be co-headlining the Take Me Home Tour from October 24 to December 13, 2024.

They announced on CMT Hot 20 Countdown on March 30, that they were in the process of recording a Christmas album, with an expected 2024 release. The Christmas Record was released on October 4, 2024.

== Discography ==
- Little Big Town (2002)
- The Road to Here (2005)
- A Place to Land (2007)
- The Reason Why (2010)
- Tornado (2012)
- Pain Killer (2014)
- Wanderlust (2016)
- The Breaker (2017)
- Nightfall (2020)
- Mr. Sun (2022)
- The Christmas Record (2024)
- It's A Dying Art (2026)

== Tours ==
=== Headlining ===
- The Reason Why Tour (2011)
- Tornado Tour (2013)
- Pain Killer Tour (2014–2015)
- The Breakers Tour (2017–2018)
- Nightfall (2020)
- Nightfall Returns (2021) (rescheduled dates from the Nightfall tour, due to the COVID-19 pandemic)
- Friends of Mine Tour (2023-2024)
- Summer Tour '25 (2025)

=== Co-headlining ===
- The Bandwagon Tour with Miranda Lambert (2018, 2022)
- Take Me Home Tour with Sugarland (2024)

=== Supporting ===
- Still Alive in 06 with Keith Urban (2006)
- CMT on Tour: Change for Change Tour with Sugarland and Jake Owen (2007)
- George Strait 2008 Arena Tour with George Strait (2008)
- The Waking Up Laughing Tour with Martina McBride (2007–08) (Legs 1 and 3)
- Carnival Ride Tour with Carrie Underwood (2008) (Fall leg)
- A Place to Land Tour with Zac Brown Band and Ashton Shepherd
- The Incredible Machine Tour 2010 with Sugarland and Randy Montana (2010) (Fall leg)
- The Incredible Machine Tour 2011 with Sugarland, Matt Nathanson and Casey James (2011) (Spring leg)
- Revolution Continues Tour with Miranda Lambert (2011) (Few dates)
- Changed Tour with Rascal Flatts, Eli Young Band and Edens Edge (2012)
- Light the Fuse Tour with Keith Urban and Dustin Lynch (2013)
- Kill the Lights Tour with Luke Bryan and Dustin Lynch (2015–16)
- 50th Anniversary Tour with Eagles (2022)

== Personal lives ==
Schlapman was born and raised in Cornelia, Georgia, and attended Demorest Baptist Church. She is the oldest of three children, with a younger sister and brother. Her mother, Barbara, was a kindergarten and second grade teacher and church organ player. Her father, Tolbert, worked for the telephone company. She started taking piano lessons at age 8, and became her church's piano player at age 11 when their regular pianist left for another church. She attended Habersham Central High School, where she was very involved in extracurricular activities and was the vice president of her senior class. Between her junior and senior years of high school, she was selected to attend the Georgia Governor's Honors Program at Valdosta State University for vocal music. She received a music scholarship to Samford University. While at Samford, she met Steven Roads, a law student, and they were married in 1990. They moved to Knoxville for his job, and Schlapman transferred to the University of Tennessee where she earned a degree in family and human development. They struggled with infertility and were unable to get pregnant. Roads died from a heart attack at home in April 2005 at the age of 41, while Little Big Town was on a radio tour in Indianapolis. On November 28, 2006, Schlapman married Stephen Schlapman, who was previously Little Big Town's stage manager. They eloped in Las Vegas six months earlier. She gave birth to a daughter, Daisy Pearl Schlapman, on July 27, 2007. They had multiple miscarriages and were unable to have another child despite artificial insemination and in vitro fertilization. The couple adopted a daughter, Dolly Grace Schlapman, on December 31, 2016. Schlapman's mother has Parkinson's disease.

Fairchild was born in Gary, Indiana and lived in Griffith, Indiana and Schererville, Indiana for the first 13.5 years of her life. She has an older sister and a younger brother. Her father, Butch, is from Oneida, Tennessee, and worked in sales for building parts after initially starting as a JCPenney shoe salesman. Her mother, Brenda, is from Geraldine, Alabama. Her parents were high school sweethearts, and moved to Indiana for her father's work before Fairchild was born. They later moved to Marietta, Georgia, where Fairchild graduated from Lassiter High School. She was very athletic, including being the quarterback of her high school's powder puff football team and played on the softball team. She rushed Alpha Delta Pi while at Samford University and earned a degree in elementary education. She grew up very religious, though now considers herself spiritual rather than religious. She divorced her first husband, Mark Childers, in 2002. Fairchild and Westbrook married on May 31, 2006. She gave birth to a son, Elijah Dylan Westbrook, on March 5, 2010.

Sweet was born in Pocahontas, Arkansas, and raised in Cherokee Village, Arkansas. He attended the First Baptist Church of Hardy, and graduated from Highland High School in 1992. He was previously divorced. Sweet married Rebecca Arthur on March 30, 2007, after meeting when she worked as an intern at Little Big Town's record label. They welcomed a daughter, Penelopi Jane Sweet, on December 27, 2007.

Westbrook was born in Jacksonville, Arkansas and raised in Sumiton, Alabama. He also lived in Tuscaloosa for four years beginning when he was four years old. He is the youngest of five siblings, with one older brother and three sisters.

== Musical stylings ==
Little Big Town's musical stylings are defined by four-part vocal harmonies. Unlike most vocal groups, Little Big Town does not feature a definitive lead vocalist. Instead, their songs are either led by any one of the four members, or by all four in varying combinations (such as on "Boondocks" and "Life in a Northern Town").

== Awards and nominations ==
=== Academy of Country Music Awards (ACM) ===
Year	Nominated work / recipient	Category	Result
2006	Little Big Town	Top New Vocal Duo/Group	Nominated
2006	Little Big Town	Top Vocal Group	Nominated
2007	Little Big Town	Top New Vocal Duo/Group	Won
2007	Little Big Town	Top Vocal Group	Nominated
2008	Little Big Town	Top Vocal Group	Nominated
2009	"Life in a Northern Town"(with Sugarland and Jake Owen)	Vocal Event of the Year	Nominated
2009	Little Big Town	Top Vocal Group	Nominated
2010	Little Big Town	Top Vocal Group	Nominated
2011	Little Big Town	Top Vocal Group	Nominated
2013	"Pontoon"	Single of the Year	Nominated
2013	Tornado	Album of the Year	Nominated
2013	"Tornado"	Music Video of the Year	Won
2013	Little Big Town	Vocal Group of the Year	Won
2014	Little Big Town	Vocal Group of the Year	Nominated
2015	Little Big Town	Vocal Group of the Year	Won
2015	Pain Killer	Album of the Year	Nominated
2016	Little Big Town	Vocal Group of the Year	Won
2016	"Girl Crush"	Single Record of the Year	Nominated
2016	"Girl Crush"	Song of the Year	Nominated
2016	"Girl Crush"	Video of the Year	Nominated
2016	Smokin' and Drinkin'	Vocal Event of the Year (shared with Miranda Lambert)	Won
2016	Little Big Town	Crystal Milestone Award	Won
2017	Little Big Town	Vocal Group of the Year	Won
2018	Little Big Town	Vocal Group of the Year	Nominated
2018	The Breaker	Album of the Year	Nominated
2018	"Better Man"	Single of the Year	Nominated
2019	Little Big Town	Vocal Group of the Year	Nominated
2020	Little Big Town	Vocal Group of the Year	Nominated
2021	Little Big Town	Vocal Group of the Year	Nominated

=== American Country Awards (ACA) ===
Year	Nominated work / recipient	Category	Result
2010	"Little White Church"	Music Video: Duo or Group	Nominated
2010	"Little White Church"	Single of the Year: Duo or Group	Nominated
2012	"Pontoon"	Music Video of the Year: Group or Collaboration	Won
2013	"Tornado"	Music Video of the Year: Group or Collaboration	Nominated
2013	"Tornado"	Single of the Year: Duo or Group	Nominated
2013	"Tornado"	Great American Country – Music Video of the Year	Nominated
2013	Little Big Town	Artist of the Year: Duo or Group	Nominated

=== American Country Countdown Awards (ACC) ===
Year	Nominated work / recipient	Category	Result
2016	"Girl Crush"	Digital Song of the Year	Won

=== American Music Awards (AMA) ===
Year	Nominated work / recipient	Category	Result
2015	Little Big Town	Favorite Duo or Group - Country	Nominated
2017	Little Big Town	Favorite Duo or Group - Country	Won

=== Billboard Music Awards ===
Year	Nominated work / recipient	Category	Result
2016	"Girl Crush"	Top Country Song	Nominated
2016	Little Big Town	Billboard Chart Achievement Award	Nominated
2017	"Better Man"	Top Country Song	Nominated

=== British Country Music Association Awards ===
Year	Nominated work	Category	Result
2016	Themselves	International Act of the Year	Nominated

=== Country Music Association Awards (CMA) ===
Year	Nominated work / recipient	Category	Result
2006	Little Big Town	Horizon Award	Nominated
2006	Little Big Town	Vocal Group of the Year	Nominated
2007	Little Big Town	Horizon Award	Nominated
2007	Little Big Town	Vocal Group of the Year	Nominated
2008	Little Big Town	Vocal Group of the Year	Nominated
2008	"Life in a Northern Town"(with Sugarland and Jake Owen)	Musical Event of the Year	Nominated
2009	Little Big Town	Vocal Group of the Year	Nominated
2010	Little Big Town	Vocal Group of the Year	Nominated
2011	Little Big Town	Vocal Group of the Year	Nominated
2012	Little Big Town	Vocal Group of the Year	Won
2012	"Pontoon"	Single of the Year	Won
2012	"Pontoon"	Music Video of the Year	Nominated
2013	Tornado	Album of the Year	Nominated
2013	"Tornado"	Music Video of the Year	Nominated
2013	Little Big Town	Vocal Group of the Year	Won
2014	Little Big Town	Vocal Group of the Year	Won
2015	Little Big Town	Vocal Group of the Year	Won
2015	"Girl Crush"	Single of the Year	Won
2015	"Girl Crush"	Music Video of the Year	Nominated
2015	Pain Killer	Album of the Year	Nominated
2015	"Smokin' and Drinkin'" (with Miranda Lambert)	Musical Event of the Year	Nominated
2016	Little Big Town	Vocal Group of the Year	Won
2017	Little Big Town	Vocal Group of the Year	Won
2017	"Better Man"	Single of the Year	Nominated
2017	"Better Man"	Music Video of the Year	Nominated
2017	The Breaker	Album of the Year	Nominated
2018	Little Big Town	International Artist Achievement Award	Won
2018	Little Big Town	Vocal Group of the Year	Nominated
2019	Little Big Town	Vocal Group of the Year	Nominated
2020	Little Big Town	Vocal Group of the Year	Nominated

=== CMT Artists of the Year ===
Year	Nominated work / recipient	Category	Result
2015	Little Big Town	Artist of the Year	Won
2018	Karen Fairchild and Kimberly Schlapman	Artist of the Year	Won

=== CMT Music Awards ===
Year	Nominated work	Category	Result
2006	"Boondocks"	Duo/Group Video of the Year	Nominated
2007	"Good as Gone"	Group Video of the Year	Nominated
2009	"Life in a Northern Town"^{[A]}	Collaborative Video of the Year	Nominated
2009	"Life in a Northern Town"^{[A]}	CMT Performance of the Year	Nominated
2011	"Little White Church"	Group Video of the Year	Nominated
2012	"Fix You" from Music Builds	CMT Performance of the Year	Nominated
2013	"Tornado"	Video of the Year	Nominated
2013	"Pontoon"	Group Video of the Year	Nominated
2014	"Your Side of the Bed"	Group Video of the Year	Nominated
2015	"Day Drinking"	Group Video of the Year	Nominated
2016	"Girl Crush"	Group/Duo Video of the Year	Won
2016	"Girl Crush"	Video of the Year	Nominated
2017	"Better Man"	Video of the Year	Nominated
2017	"Better Man"	Group Video of the Year	Won
2018	"When Someone Stops Loving You"	Group Video of the Year	Won
2018	"Stand Up for Something"^{[B]}	Performance of the Year	Nominated
2018	"I Won't Back Down"^{[C]}	Performance of the Year	Nominated
2019	"I Can't Make You Love Me/Help Me Make It Through the Night^{[D]}	Performance of the Year	Nominated
2019	"Summer Fever"	Group Video of the Year	Nominated
2020	"Wine, Beer, Whiskey (Live Cut)"	Group Video of the Year	Nominated
2021	"Wine, Beer, Whiskey"	Duo/Group Video of the Year	Won

A. with Sugarland and Jake Owen
B. with Andra Day, Common, Lee Ann Womack and Danielle Bradbery
C. with Jason Aldean, Keith Urban and Chris Stapleton
D. with Gladys Knight

=== Daytime Emmy Awards ===
Year	Nominated work	Category	Result
2013	"Good Afternoon"	Outstanding Original Song	Won

=== Grammy Awards ===
Year	Nominated work	Category	Result
2007	The Road to Here	Best Country Album	Nominated
2007	"Boondocks"	Best Country Vocal Performance by a Duo/Group	Nominated
2009	"Life in a Northern Town"(with Sugarland and Jake Owen)	Best Country Collaboration with Vocals	Nominated
2011	"Little White Church"	Best Country Performance by a Duo/Group with Vocals	Nominated
2013	"Pontoon"	Best Country Duo/Group Performance	Won
2014	"Your Side of the Bed"	Best Country Duo/Group Performance	Nominated
2015	"Day Drinking"	Best Country Duo/Group Performance	Nominated
2016	"Girl Crush"	Best Country Duo/Group Performance	Won
2016	Pain Killer	Best Country Album	Nominated
2018	The Breaker	Best Country Album	Nominated
2018	"Better Man"	Best Country Duo/Group Performance	Won
2018	Little Big Town	On the Hill Award	Won
2019	"When Someone Stops Loving You"	Best Country Duo/Group Performance	Nominated
2020	"The Daughters"	Best Country Duo/Group Performance	Nominated
2021	"Sugar Coat"	Best Country Duo/Group Performance	Nominated
2021	Nightfall	Best Country Album	Nominated

Note: "Girl Crush" was also nominated for Song of the Year and Best Country Song in 2016 (winning the latter), but in this category the award goes to the composer(s) of the song, not to the performing artist(s). The song was written and composed by Lori McKenna, Hillary Lindsey, and Liz Rose

Note: "Better Man" was also nominated for Best Country Song in 2018, but in this category the award goes to the composer(s) of the song, not to the performing artist(s). The song was written and composed by Taylor Swift

Note: "When Someone Stops Loving You" was also nominated for Best Country Song in 2019, but in this category the award goes to the composer(s) of the song, not to the performing artist(s). The song was written and composed by Hillary Lindsey, Chase McGill, and Lori McKenna

=== People's Choice Awards ===
Year	Nominated work	Category	Result
2016	Little Big Town	Favorite Country Group	Nominated
2017	Little Big Town	Favorite Country Group	Won

=== Teen Choice Awards ===
Year	Nominated work	Category	Result
2011	Little Big Town	Choice Country Group	Nominated
2013	Little Big Town	Choice Country Group	Nominated

== Television appearances ==
Year	Series	Role	Notes
2006	CMT Crossroads	Themselves	(with Lindsey Buckingham)
2013-15	CMA Music Festival: Country's Night To Rock	Themselves/Host	
2014	The Voice	Themselves / Adviser	Season 7 Battle Round with Team Blake
2016	The Voice	Themselves	Season 10 finale performance result
2016	Greatest Hits	Themselves	
2017	Sesame Street	Themselves	Season 47, Episode 17
2017	The Voice	Themselves	Season 12 finale performance result with Lauren Duski
2018–19	CMT Music Awards	Themselves/Host	
2019	The Voice	Themselves	Season 17 final performance with Jake Hoot
2020	The Disney Family Singalong	Themselves	Performing "A Spoonful of Sugar" with their respective children
2022	Monarch	Themselves	Episode: "There Can Only Be One Queen"
2025	The Voice	Themselves/Advisors	Season 27 for Team Kelsea
