= Blake Wise =

American singer-songwriter

- Born: c. 1989; Nebo, North Carolina
- Genres: Country
- Instrument: Vocals
- Years active: 2008–present
- Labels: Equity Music Group; Broken Bow

Blake Wise is an American country music singer from Nebo, North Carolina. He is signed to the independent Broken Bow Records, for which he has released three singles: "Cornfields," "I've Got This Feeling" and "Can't Live Without."

== Biography ==
Wise learned to play guitar at age four and began touring with his father at age thirteen. Two years later, a record label manager encouraged Wise to move to Nashville, Tennessee once Wise had turned eighteen.

Wise signed to Equity Music Group in 2008 at age nineteen. The label closed soon afterward, and he signed to Broken Bow Records in September 2009. Broken Bow released his single "Cornfields" in mid-2010, followed by "I've Got This Feeling" later in the year. This song debuted at number 59 on the Billboard Hot Country Songs chart dated for the week ending December 11, 2010. A third single, "Can't Live Without," was released in September 2011.

== Discography ==
=== Singles ===
Year	Single	Peak positions
Year	Single	US Country
2010	"Cornfields"	—
2010	"I've Got This Feeling"	54
2011	"Can't Live Without"	—
"—" denotes releases that did not chart

=== Music videos ===
Year	Video	Director
2011	"Can't Live Without"	John Fucile
