= Little Big Town (album) =

Studio album by Little Big Town
- Released: May 21, 2002
- Genre: Country
- Length: 37:23
- Label: Monument
- Producers: Blake Chancey; Paul Worley; Little Big Town

Little Big Town chronology
Little Big Town (2002)	The Road to Here (2005)

Singles from Little Big Town
- 1. "Don't Waste My Time" Released: February 11, 2002; 2. "Everything Changes" Released: June 24, 2002

Professional ratings
Review scores
Source	Rating
Allmusic	2.5/5 stars

Little Big Town is the self-titled debut studio album by American country music group Little Big Town. It was released on May 21, 2002, through Monument Records. The album produced two singles on the Hot Country Songs charts: "Don't Waste My Time" and "Everything Changes", which reached number 33 and number 42, respectively. "Stay" was re-recorded for the group's second album, The Road to Here.

The group co-produced the album with Blake Chancey, with further production from Paul Worley on tracks 1, 4, and 10.

== Track listing ==
No.	Title	Writer(s)	Length
1.	"Pontiac"	Karen Fairchild; Kimberly Roads; Phillip Sweet; Jimi Westbrook; Wayne Kirkpatrick	3:43
2.	"Everything Changes"	Fairchild; Roads; Sweet; Westbrook; Tommy Lee James; Jennifer Kimball	3:44
3.	"Don't Waste My Time"	Fairchild; Roads; Sweet; Westbrook; Irene Kelley; Clay Mills	2:50
4.	"Still"	Fairchild; Roads; Sweet; Westbrook; T. L. James	3:27
5.	"Never Felt Love"	Fairchild; Roads; Sweet; Westbrook; D. Vincent Williams	3:46
6.	"Tryin'"	Brett James; Troy Verges	4:03
7.	"Stay"	Fairchild; Road; Sweet; Westbrook; Jason Deere	3:27
8.	"Somewhere Far Away"	Helen Darling; Mark Selby	4:03
9.	"A Thousand Years"	Brad Crisler; B. James	3:52
10.	"From This Dream"	Kevin Fisher; B. James	4:28
Total length:			37:23

== Personnel ==
Little Big Town

- Karen Fairchild – vocals
- Kimberly Roads – vocals
- Phillip Sweet – vocals, acoustic guitar
- Jimi Westbrook – vocals

Additional Musicians

- Gary Burnette – electric guitar
- Matt Chamberlain – drums
- Mark Childers – bass guitar
- Dave Cleveland – 12-string guitar, acoustic guitar, mandolin
- Dan Dugmore – dobro, electric guitar, steel guitar
- Tony Harrell – keyboards, Hammond organ, Wurlitzer
- Aubrey Haynie – fiddle, mandolin
- David Huff – drums, electric guitar, percussion, programming
- Kirk "Jelly Roll" Johnson – harmonica
- Jerry McPherson – electric guitar
- Steve Nathan – keyboards
- Craig Nelson – bass guitar, string bass
- Billy Panda – acoustic guitar
- Darrell Scott – bouzouki, 12-string guitar, acoustic guitar
- Jimmie Lee Sloas – bass guitar
- Paul Worley – acoustic guitar, electric guitar, slide guitar
- Jonathan Yudkin – cello, mandolin, viola, violin

== Chart performance ==
Weekly chart performance for Little Big Town
Chart (2002)	Peak position
US Heatseekers Albums (Billboard)	43
US Top Country Albums (Billboard)	40
