= The Road to Here =

Studio album by Little Big Town
- Released: October 4, 2005
- Genre: Country
- Length: 52:20
- Label: Equity
- Producers: Wayne Kirkpatrick; Little Big Town

Little Big Town chronology
Little Big Town (2002)	The Road to Here (2005)	A Place to Land (2007)

Singles from The Road to Here
- 1. "Boondocks" Released: May 5, 2005; 2. "Bring It On Home" Released: January 30, 2006; 3. "Good as Gone" Released: September 25, 2006; 4. "A Little More You" Released: February 19, 2007

Professional ratings
Review scores
Source	Rating
Allmusic	4/5 stars
Stylus Magazine	A−

The Road to Here is the second studio album by American country music group Little Big Town. The album was released on October 4, 2005, by Equity Records and has been certified Platinum by the RIAA. The album was nominated for Best Country Album and "Boondocks" was nominated for Best Country Performance by a Duo or Group with Vocals at the 49th Annual Grammy Awards.

== Content ==
Singles released from the album include "Boondocks", "Bring It On Home", "Good as Gone", and "A Little More You", all of which charted in the Top 20 on the Hot Country Songs charts. "Bring It On Home" was the highest, at number 4, and "Boondocks" reached number 9 in addition to achieving a gold certification as a single. Besides these songs, an acoustic rendition of "Stay", a song from the group's self-titled debut, is included. According to the liner notes, Kimberly Roads was inspired to write "Lost" after her husband died.

== Track listing ==
All tracks are written by Karen Fairchild, Kimberly Roads, Phillip Sweet, Jimi Westbrook, and Wayne Kirkpatrick except as noted.

No.	Title	Writer(s)	Lead vocals	Length
1.	"Good as Gone"		Fairchild	4:12
2.	"Boondocks"		Fairchild; Roads; Sweet; Westbrook	4:32
3.	"Bones"		Fairchild; Roads; Sweet; Westbrook	3:46
4.	"Bring It On Home"	Greg Bieck; Tyler Hayes Bieck; Kirkpatrick	Sweet	4:20
5.	"Wounded"		Roads	3:39
6.	"A Little More You"		Westbrook	4:25
7.	"Live with Lonesome"	Julian Bunetta; Kirkpatrick	Fairchild	3:47
8.	"Mean Streak"		Roads	4:33
9.	"Looking for a Reason"	Thad Beaty; Kirkpatrick; Shelly Fairchild	Fairchild	3:05
10.	"Lost"		Westbrook	4:38
11.	"Welcome to the Family"	Kirkpatrick; Jim Collins	Sweet; Westbrook	4:10
12.	"Fine with Me"		Westbrook	3:26
13.	"Stay" (acoustic version)	K. Fairchild; Roads; Sweet; Westbrook; Jason Deere	Roads; Fairchild	3:47
Total length:				52:20

== Personnel ==
As listed in liner notes.

=== Little Big Town ===
- Karen Fairchild – vocals
- Kimberly Roads – vocals
- Philip Sweet – vocals
- Jimi Westbrook – vocals

=== Additional musicians ===
- Ron Block – banjo (tracks 1, 2, 5, 11), acoustic guitar (tracks 1, 5, 7)
- Mark Childers – bass guitar (tracks 2, 7)
- Jerry Douglas – Dobro (track 2)
- Dan Dugmore – Dobro (tracks 4, 10), steel guitar (tracks 4, 8)
- Gordon Kennedy – electric guitar (tracks 2, 3, 4, 6, 8, 9, 11, 12)
- Wayne Kirkpatrick – acoustic guitar (all tracks except 9), National guitar (tracks 1, 3, 6, 9, 12), octave mandolin (tracks 2, 5), dulcimer (track 3), piano (track 4), banjitar (tracks 6, 9, 12), mando-guitar (track 8), "pencil guitar" (track 8), Hammond B4 Organ (track 10), programming (track 10), mandolin (tracks 12, 13)
- Chris McHugh – drums (all tracks except 13)
- Jimmie Lee Sloas – bass guitar (all tracks except 2, 7, 9, 13)
- Adam Steffey – mandolin (track 1)
- Jackie Street – bass guitar (track 9)
- Jonathan Yudkin – mandolin (tracks 7, 11), fiddle (track 7), Celtic harp (track 7)

=== Technical ===
- Kristin Barlowe – photography
- "JB" – engineering, mixing (track 3 only)
- Wayne Kirkpatrick – producer
- Little Big Town – producer
- Glenn Spinner – engineering
- Aaron Swehart – engineering
- David Zaffiro – mixing (except track 3)

== Chart performance ==
=== Weekly charts ===
Chart (2005–06)	Peak position
US Billboard 200	51
US Top Country Albums (Billboard)	12
US Independent Albums (Billboard)	1

=== Year-end charts ===
Chart (2006)	Position
US Billboard 200	75
US Top Country Albums (Billboard)	22

Chart (2007)	Position
US Billboard 200	167
US Top Country Albums (Billboard)	33

== Certifications ==
Region	Certification
United States (RIAA)	Platinum
