= God Willing (soundtrack) =

God Willing (Om Gud vill)

Soundtrack album by Nathan Larson
- Released: July 14, 2006
- Recorded: 2006
- Genre: Soundtrack
- Length: 12:39
- Label: Playground

God Willing is the soundtrack to Amir Chamdin's film God Willing set in 1975 Stockholm. The original Swedish title is Om Gud vill. The soundtrack was composed by Nathan Larson, who previously scored such films as Dirty Pretty Things and Boys Don't Cry.

This 5-track EP includes two songs featuring Nina Persson of The Cardigans who plays Finnish tango singer Juli in the film. She is also the wife of Nathan Larson.

== Track listing ==
1. "God Willing Theme" - Nathan Larson
2. "Oriental Love (Itämaista Rakkautta)" - Juli and the Monoliths
3. "Aatini El-Naya" - Nathan Larson
4. "Dead Leaves and the Dirty Ground" - Nina Persson & Nathan Larson
5. "God Willing End Title" - Nathan Larson
