= Bring It On Home (Little Big Town song) =

Single by Little Big Town

from the album The Road to Here
- Released: January 30, 2006
- Genre: Country
- Length: 4:20
- Label: Equity
- Songwriters: Greg Bieck; Tyler Hayes Bieck; Wayne Kirkpatrick
- Producers: Wayne Kirkpatrick; Little Big Town

Little Big Town singles chronology
"Boondocks" (2005)	"Bring It On Home" (2006)	"Good as Gone" (2006)

"Bring It On Home" is a song written by Greg Bieck, Tyler Hayes Bieck and Wayne Kirkpatrick and recorded by American country music group Little Big Town. It was released in January 2006 as the second single from their album The Road to Here. This was the band's highest charting single until "Pontoon" hit number 1.

== Content ==
"Bring It On Home" is a mid-tempo ballad where the male narrator promises to offer support to his lover at the end of a stressful day.

== Critical reception ==
Deborah Evans Price, of Billboard magazine reviewed the song favorably saying that the song "boasts a warm, soothing melody and tender lyric." She goes on to say that "gorgeous harmonies turn a well-written song into an amazing experience."

== Music video ==
A music video, directed by Kristin Barlowe, was released along with the song. The video peaked at number 1 on CMT's Top Twenty Countdown for two consecutive weeks in June 2006.

== Chart performance ==
Chart (2006)	Peak position
US Billboard Hot 100	58
US Hot Country Songs (Billboard)	4

=== Year-end charts ===
Chart (2006)	Position
US Country Songs (Billboard)	11
