= The Christmas Record =

Studio album by Little Big Town
- Released: October 12, 2024
- Recorded: 2023
- Genres: Christmas; country
- Length: 37:00
- Label: Capitol Nashville
- Producer: Dave Cobb

Little Big Town chronology
Mr. Sun (2022)	The Christmas Record (2024)	It's a Dying Art (2026)

Singles from The Christmas Record
- 1. "Christmas Night with You" Released: September 13, 2024

The Christmas Record is the eleventh studio album and first Christmas record by American country music group Little Big Town. It was released on October 4, 2024, through Capitol Nashville and was produced by Dave Cobb. The albums features cover versions of Christmas songs, as well as five original songs, including a new version of "Have Yourself a Merry Little Christmas" different from the version they released in 2011.

== Background and recording ==
In March 2024, while appearing on CMT Hot 20 Little Big Town announced that they were in the process of recording a Christmas album. In September 2024, they officially announced the album and its lead single, "Christmas Night with You".

The album was recorded in 2023, and most of it was recorded in Savannah, Georgia.

== Release and promotion ==
The album was released by Capitol Nashville on October 4, 2024. To help promote the album, Little Big Town hosted NBC's Christmas at the Opry on December 16, 2024.

== Track listing ==
The Christmas Record track listing
No.	Title	Writer(s)	Lead vocals	Length
1.	"Glow"	Karen Fairchild; Ashley Monroe; Connie Harrington	Fairchild	3:21
2.	"Santa Claus Is Back in Town"	Jerry Leiber; Mike Stoller	Jimi Westbrook	2:16
3.	"If We Make It Through December"	Merle Haggard	Fairchild	3:01
4.	"Someday at Christmas"	Ron Miller; Bryan Wells	Phillip Sweet; Westbrook; Fairchild; Kimberly Schlapman	2:51
5.	"Christmas Night with You"	Fairchild; Tofer Brown; Ashley Ray	Fairchild	3:39
6.	"Believe in Christmas"	Fairchild; Monroe; Harrington	Schlapman; Westbrook; Sweet; Fairchild	3:54
7.	"Have Yourself a Merry Little Christmas"	Hugh Martin; Ralph Blane	Fairchild	3:42
8.	"Tennessee Christmas"	Amy Grant; Gary Chapman	Schlapman	3:51
9.	"Christmas Time Is Here"	Vince Guaraldi; Lee Mendelson	Fairchild	3:04
10.	"Evergreen"	Fairchild; Westbrook; Schlapman; Sweet; Dave Cobb	Fairchild; Schlapman	3:41
11.	"Holiday"	Fairchild; Westbrook; Schlapman; Sweet	Fairchild	3:35

== Personnel ==
Little Big Town

- Karen Fairchild – vocals (all tracks)
- Kimberly Schlapman – vocals (all tracks)
- Philip Sweet – vocals (all tracks)
- Jimi Westbrook – vocals (all tracks)

Technical

- Dave Cobb – producer

== Charts ==
Chart performance for The Christmas Record
Chart (2024)	Peak position
US Top Holiday Albums (Billboard)	23
