= Mr. Sun =

Studio album by Little Big Town
- Released: September 16, 2022
- Genre: Country; country pop
- Length: 57:36
- Label: Capitol Nashville
- Producer: Little Big Town

Little Big Town chronology
Nightfall (2020)	Mr. Sun (2022)	The Christmas Record (2024)

Singles from Mr. Sun
- 1. "Hell Yeah" Released: April 11, 2022

Mr. Sun is the tenth studio album by American country music group Little Big Town. It was released on September 16, 2022, through Capitol Nashville and is a follow-up to their 2020 release Nightfall. It was self-produced by the band and features the single "Hell Yeah".

== Background ==
The band announced the album in July 2022. The creation of the album is nearly perfectly divided with seven of the sixteen songs written and recorded in sessions for the previous album, Nightfall, the rest of which from sessions taking place during the COVID-19 pandemic. During the pandemic, it was the first time in twenty years that the band did not tour. It was during this time that they found the inspiration to write for this album.

Jimi Westbrook wrote "Rich Man", which he described as the "most heartfelt, personal, and special" song he's ever written. He began writing the song around the year 2009, and finished it in late 2021.

== Critical reception ==
Professional ratings
Review scores
Source	Rating
AllMusic	4/5 stars

Stephen Thomas Erlewine of All Music wrote that the album "is filled with sweetness, hope, and light, a record built for comfort, not speed. Consider the overwhelming sweetness as the band's way of processing the upheaval generated by the COVID-19 pandemic. I stead of wallowing in sorrow, they bask in the sunshine; even the slower ballads act as a balm, serving up smoothing melodies instead of sadness."

Catherine Walthall of American Songwriter praised the album saying, "Mr. Sun is a bright, upbeat album heavily inspired by the groovy music from the '70s. It's an album perfectly suited for yacht rock hang-outs or rollerblading meet-ups. Inside the record, notes reminiscent of the Bee Gees, Fleetwood Mac, and the Eagles ring out, but they're all tailored to Little Big Town's country expertise. Songs like "Gold" and "Heaven Had A Dance Floor" possess a particularly disco-definite sound."

Nicole Piering for Country Swag calls "Little Big Town at its absolute best" with Mr. Sun.

Zackary Kephart of The Musical Divide had mixed reviews for the album. He felt that the album was an "oddly disjointed attempt at both expanding the more mature sonic and lyrical foundation they set on their previous albums and throwing a few slick, ultra-polished cuts in along the way for good measure." Though he did say that "there's also a richness present in a lot of the organic warmth that can still feel unique to this band's core, especially when it can match writing that's only grown more mature and nuanced with each passing album."

== Promotion ==
On September 14, 2022, Little Big Town appeared on The Tonight Show Starring Jimmy Fallon, and performed "Hell Yeah" and "Rich Man". They also appeared on The Today Show on September 16, 2022.

== Singles ==
"Hell Yeah", the lead single was released on April 11, 2022.

== Track listing ==
Mr. Sun track listing '*' - denotes that the song was written and recorded during the Nightfall sessions.
No.	Title	Writer(s)	Lead vocals	Length
1.	"All Summer"	Karen Fairchild; Sarah Buxton; Madi Diaz; Ashley Ray; Savana Santos; Alysa Vanderheym	Karen Fairchild	2:51
2.	"Better Love"	Fairchild; Jimi Westbrook; Tofer Brown; Audra Mae	Fairchild	3:02
3.	"Hell Yeah*"	Westbrook; Phillip Sweet; Corey Crowder; Tyler Hubbard	Phillip Sweet	2:55
4.	"Mr. Sun"	Buxton; Daniel Tashian	Jimi Westbrook	4:22
5.	"Three Whiskeys and the Truth"	Fairchild; Kimberly Schlapman; Hillary Lindsey; Lori McKenna; Liz Rose	Fairchild	3:53
6.	"One More Song*"	Brown; Sean McConnell	Fairchild; Westbrook	3:38
7.	"Heaven Had a Dance Floor*"	Fairchild; Westbrook; Sweet; Cary Barlowe; Jesse Frasure	Kimberly Schlapman	3:26
8.	"Gold*"	Fairchild; Westbrook; Trent Dabbs; Luke Dick	Fairchild	3:13
9.	"Rich Man"	Westbrook	Westbrook	3:30
10.	"God Fearing Gypsies"	Fairchild; Ray; Nicolette Hayford	Westbrook	3:56
11.	"Different Without You*"	Crowder; Jared Mullins; Steven Lee Olsen; Jordan Schmidt	Sweet	3:11
12.	"Whiskey Colored Eyes*"	Fairchild; Schlapman; Westbrook; Sweet; Shane McAnally; Josh Osborne	Westbrook	4:21
13.	"Song Back"	Fairchild; Westbrook; Todd Clark; Sara Haze; Jason Saenz	Fairchild	3:08
14.	"Something Strong"	Fairchild; Schlapman; Lindsey; McKenna; Rose	Fairchild	3:34
15.	"Last Day on Earth"	Fairchild; Dabbs; Tommy English	Fairchild; Schlapman; Sweet; Westbrook	3:57
16.	"Friends of Mine*"	Fairchild; Schlapman; Westbrook; Sweet; Foy Vance	Sweet	4:32
Total length:				57:36

== Personnel ==
Little Big Town

- Karen Fairchild – vocals (all tracks), tambourine (13), production (all tracks), art direction
- Kimberly Schlapman – vocals (all tracks), production (all tracks)
- Philip Sweet – vocals (all tracks), keyboards (11), 12-string acoustic guitar (12), acoustic guitar (15), production (all tracks)
- Jimi Westbrook – vocals (all tracks), production (all tracks)

Additional musicians

- Tim Galloway – acoustic guitar (1–10, 12, 14), electric guitar (1, 2, 5–10, 12–16), percussion (5), mandolin (8, 15), banjo (15)
- John Thomasson – bass
- Hubert Payne – drums (all tracks), percussion (1–5, 7–16), production (1)
- Akil Thompson – electric guitar (1, 3, 4, 8, 11–13, 16), keyboards (1–7, 10–16), Hammond B3 (2–4, 6, 10, 12, 13, 16), acoustic guitar (7, 12, 16), percussion (11, 16)
- Evan Weatherford – electric guitar (1, 3–8, 10–16), acoustic guitar (11)
- Alysa Vanderheym – percussion, production, synthesizer (1),
- Josh Reynolds – programming (1, 14)
- Daniel Tashian – electric guitar (7)
- Luke Dick – clavichord, percussion (8)
- Jedd Hughes – electric guitar (11)
- Todd Clark – electric guitar, keyboards, percussion (13)

Technical

- Emily Lazar – mastering
- Chris Allgood – mastering
- Rob Kinelski – mixing, engineering
- Alysa Vanderheym – additional production (1)
- Luke Dick – additional production (8)
- Todd Clark – additional production, recording (13)
- Josh Reynolds – recording (all tracks), vocal engineering (1, 5, 6, 9, 11, 13)
- Jason Hall – editing (12)
- Casey Cuayo – engineering assistance
- Eli Heisler – engineering assistance
- Zaq Reynolds – engineering assistance (1, 3, 4, 6, 7, 10–12, 15, 16)
- Joe Trentacosti – engineering assistance (2, 4, 5, 8, 9, 13, 14)
- Nico Salgado – engineering assistance (9)
- Jacob Butler – engineering assistance (13, 16)

Design

- Mary Hooper – art direction, design
- Ashley Kohorst – art direction, design
- Kelly Jarrell – art direction
- Kera Jackson – art production
- Blair Getz Mezibov – photography

== Charts ==
Chart performance for Mr. Sun
Chart (2022)	Peak position
Australian Digital Albums (ARIA)	24
Scottish Albums (OCC)	57
UK Country Albums (OCC)	5
US Billboard 200	56
US Top Country Albums (Billboard)	10
