= God Willing (2006 film) =

- Directed by: Amir Chamdin
- Written by: Amir Chamdin
- Starring: Nina Persson; Amir Chamdin
- Music by: Nathan Larson
- Release date: 10 February 2006
- Running time: 87 min
- Country: Sweden
- Language: Swedish

God Willing (Swedish: Om Gud vill) is a 2006 Swedish romance film directed by Amir Chamdin. The soundtrack for this film composed by Nathan Larson contains two songs by Nina Persson.

== Cast ==
- Nina Persson - Juli
- Amir Chamdin - Juan
- Janne "Loffe" Carlsson - David
- Hassan Brijany - Giuseppe
- Georgi Staykov - Joro
- Sunil Munshi - Jean-Claude
- Alexander Karim - Mohammed
