= Wanderlust (Little Big Town album) =

Studio album by Little Big Town
- Released: June 10, 2016
- Recorded: 2016
- Genres: Country pop; psychedelic pop; R&B; folk; sunshine pop; disco
- Length: 25:53
- Label: Capitol Nashville
- Producers: Pharrell Williams (exec.); Chad Hugo; Justin Timberlake

Little Big Town chronology
Pain Killer (2014)	Wanderlust (2016)	The Breaker (2017)

Singles from Wanderlust
- 1. "One of Those Days" Released: May 24, 2016

Wanderlust is the seventh studio album by American country music group Little Big Town. It was released on June 10, 2016, through Capitol Nashville.

== Background and composition ==
Little Big Town announced on May 24, 2016, that they would be releasing a new album. For the album the group collaborated with songwriter-producer, Pharrell Williams. The album came about after the group had a writing session with Williams in January 2016 that "turned into multiple writing sessions, as well as back and forth trips from Nashville to Los Angeles." They then wanted to share the music when they "realized it was too special not to share" with fans.

Karen Fairchild said, "It's not a country album [...] And it's not like anything we've ever done. It's fun to be spontaneous and put it out there to the fans, because we want to, and not to overthink it, but just because it has brought us a lot of joy, and we think it will for them as well. So why not? We're going with our gut and putting it out there. It's just music, you know?" Fairchild also stated that the band were working on a country album with Jay Joyce.

According to Pharrell Williams, singer Justin Timberlake also played a small role on the record by singing on "C'mon", the second song on the album. "We were in the same studio at the same time," Pharrell explained to Entertainment Tonight. "So we had Justin in one room, Little Big Town in another room. Quite naturally, people are going to visit each other, and Justin ended up singing on one of the songs."

== Singles ==
"One of Those Days" was released on May 24, 2016, as the lead single from the album.

== Track listing ==
Adapted from iTunes.
All tracks written by Karen Fairchild, Kimberly Schlapman, Jimi Westbrook, Phillip Sweet, and Pharrell Williams, unless otherwise noted.

No.	Title	Writer(s)	Lead vocals	Length
1.	"One Dance"		Fairchild	3:18
2.	"C'mon"	Williams; Justin Timberlake	Westbrook; Fairchild	2:59
3.	"One of Those Days"		Westbrook	3:39
4.	"Work"		Fairchild; Schlapman; Westbrook; Sweet	2:56
5.	"Skinny Dippin'"		Fairchild; Schlapman; Westbrook; Sweet	3:19
6.	"Willpower"		Fairchild	3:21
7.	"Miracle"	Fairchild; Schlapman; Westbrook; Sweet; Williams; Chad Hugo	Fairchild; Schlapman; Westbrook; Sweet	3:38
8.	"The Boat"		Sweet	2:43
Total length:				25:53

=== Notes ===
- "C'mon" features vocals from Justin Timberlake and Pharrell Williams.

== Charts ==
Chart (2016)	Peak position
UK Country Albums (Official Charts)	6
US Billboard 200	103

== Release history ==
List of release dates, showing region, formats, label, editions and references
Region	Date	Format(s)	Label	Edition(s)	Ref
Australia	June 10, 2016	digital download	Universal Music	Standard	
Canada	June 10, 2016	digital download	Universal Music	Standard	
United States	June 10, 2016	digital download	Capitol Nashville	Standard	
