= Gena Johnson =

Gena Johnson is an American music producer and audio engineer. She is a multi-nominee—and the first female nominee—for the Academy of Country Music Awards Audio Engineer of the Year and has won two Grammy Awards.

== Early life ==
She was introduced to audio recording through her grandfather's reel-to-reel recorder and "knew I wanted to do something behind the scenes in music." She sang in church and began classical voice lessons when she was 12. Her grandfather would record her singing and their conversations.

== Career ==
Johnson graduated from Minnesota State University, Mankato in 2012 with a Music Industry degree and moved to Nashville in 2013. After arriving in Nashville, she worked as an intern at recording studio Welcome to 1979 where she "fixed tape machines and consoles." She described her early analog experiences (the studio wasn't using a digital audio workstation) as helping her learn to troubleshoot quickly and "learning how the gear worked to be able to fix technical issues that could arise during sessions." Johnson also worked with Michael Wagener, who had produced music by Metallica and Ozzy Osbourne, as well as with Ben Folds and Dave Cobb at RCA Studio A.

Johnson has worked with artists including John Prine, Kacey Musgraves, Ashley Monroe, Chris Stapleton, Jason Isbell, Kathleen Edwards, and Brandi Carlile and The Highwomen. Her first number one was Lee Brice's "I Don't Dance (album)" in 2014 and she engineered John Prine's last vocal session, for "I Remember Everything", which earned two posthumous Grammy Awards.

== Professional awards ==
Johnson has been nominated for Academy of Country Music (ACM) Awards Audio Engineer of the Year in 2021, 2022, and 2023. She was the first female engineer to ever be nominated. She has won two Grammy awards, for Best Americana Album (Jason Isbell and the 400 Unit's "Weathervanes") and for Best Country Album (Chris Stapleton's "Starting Over").
