= A Place to Land (Little Big Town album) =

Studio album by Little Big Town
- Released: November 6, 2007
- Genre: Country
- Length: 50:53
- Labels: Equity; Capitol Nashville (re-release)
- Producer: Wayne Kirkpatrick

Little Big Town chronology
The Road to Here (2005)	A Place to Land (2007)	The Reason Why (2010)

Singles from A Place to Land
- 1. "I'm with the Band" Released: September 8, 2007; 2. "Fine Line" Released: July 14, 2008; 3. "Good Lord Willing" Released: December 1, 2008

Cover of Capitol Records re-issue

Professional ratings
Review scores
Source	Rating
Allmusic	4/5 stars
Entertainment Weekly	A−
Slant	3.5/5 stars

A Place to Land is the third studio album by American country music group Little Big Town. Released on November 6, 2007, as their second album on the independent Equity Music Group label, it features the single "I'm with the Band", which peaked at number 32 on the Billboard Hot Country Songs charts in late 2007.

In 2008, the group left Equity Music Group for Capitol Records Nashville, which acquired the rights to the album. Capitol re-released the album on October 14, 2008, with four extra tracks, including one digital exclusive. One addition to the re-issue is a live cover of The Dream Academy's "Life in a Northern Town", which Little Big Town performed with Jake Owen and Sugarland in late 2007. This live rendition, though not released as a single, charted at number 28 on the country charts and number 43 on the Billboard Hot 100 in mid-2008. Following this live rendition were the singles "Fine Line" (which peaked at number 31) and "Good Lord Willing" (which peaked at number 43).

== Track listing ==
All songs written by Little Big Town and Wayne Kirkpatrick except where noted.

No.	Title	Writer(s)	Lead vocals	Length
1.	"Fine Line"		Fairchild	4:01
2.	"I'm with the Band"		Karen Fairchild; Kimberly Roads; Philip Sweet; Jimi Westbrook	4:24
3.	"That's Where I'll Be"		Westbrook	4:51
4.	"Evangeline"		Roads	4:33
5.	"Vapor"		Sweet	4:13
6.	"Novocaine"		Fairchild; Roads; Sweet; Westbrook	4:10
7.	"Only What You Make of It"		Fairchild	5:09
8.	"A Place to Land"		Roads	3:12
9.	"Firebird Fly"	Jon Mabe; Jon Randall; Jessi Alexander	Sweet	3:15
10.	"To Know Love"		Westbrook	4:17
11.	"Lonely Enough"	Alexander; Randall; Darrell Brown	Fairchild	4:22
12.	"Fury"		Westbrook	4:26
Total length:				50:53

Reissue Bonus Tracks
No.	Title	Writer(s)	Lead vocals	Length
13.	"Good Lord Willing"		Fairchild; Roads; Sweet; Westbrook	4:33
14.	"Love Profound"	Kirkpatrick	Fairchild, Roads	3:57
15.	"You're Gonna Love Me"		Westbrook	4:24
16.	"Life in a Northern Town" (live recording featuring Sugarland and Jake Owen)	Gilbert Gabriel; Nick Laird-Clowes	Fairchild; Roads; Sweet; Westbrook; Owen; Kristian Bush; Jennifer Nettles	4:15
17.	"Four Leaf Clover" (Digital Download only)	Abra Moore	Fairchild	3:22
Total length:				71:24

== Chart performance ==
=== Weekly charts ===
Chart (2007)	Peak position
US Billboard 200	24
US Top Country Albums (Billboard)	10
US Independent Albums (Billboard)	3

=== Year-end charts ===
Chart (2008)	Position
US Top Country Albums (Billboard)	47
US Independent Albums (Billboard)	32
