= Mixed-gender band =

Musical group exclusively composed of both male and female musicians

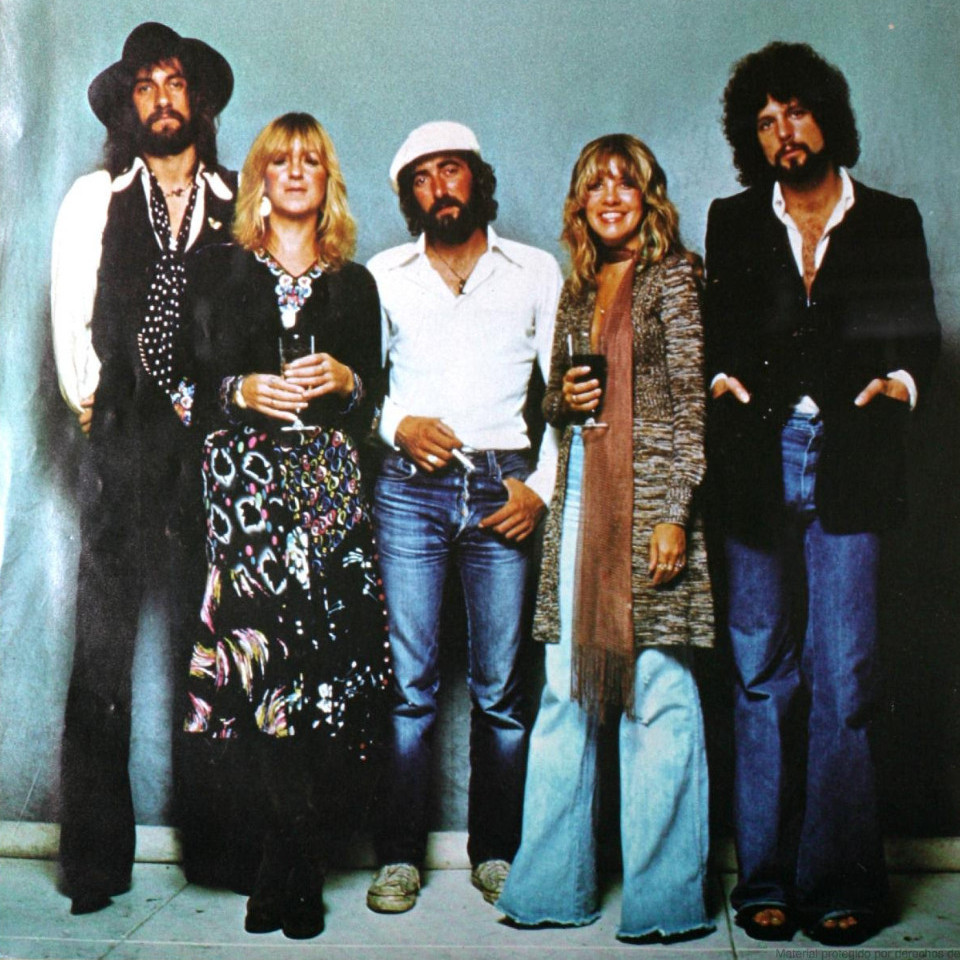
For most of its existence, Fleetwood Mac was composed of two female and three male members

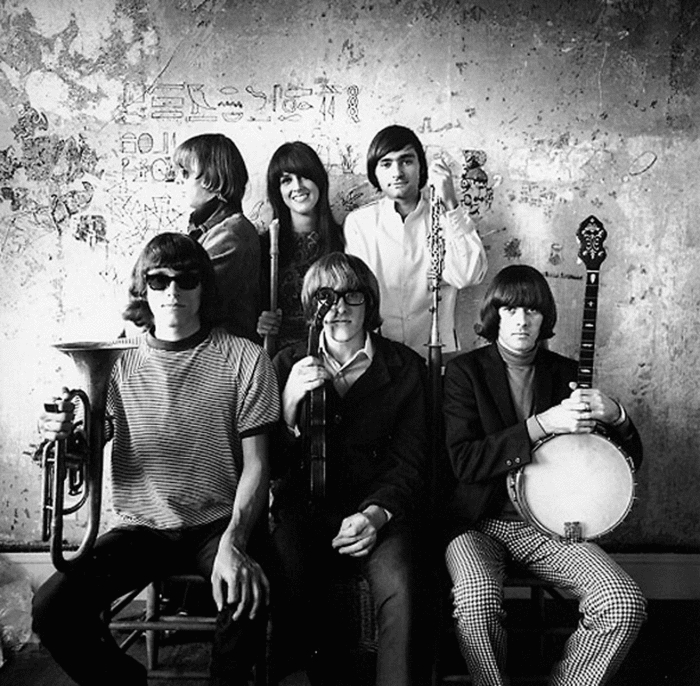
The band Jefferson Airplane, fronted by Grace Slick, as a prototypical example of a band with one female member as the lead singer

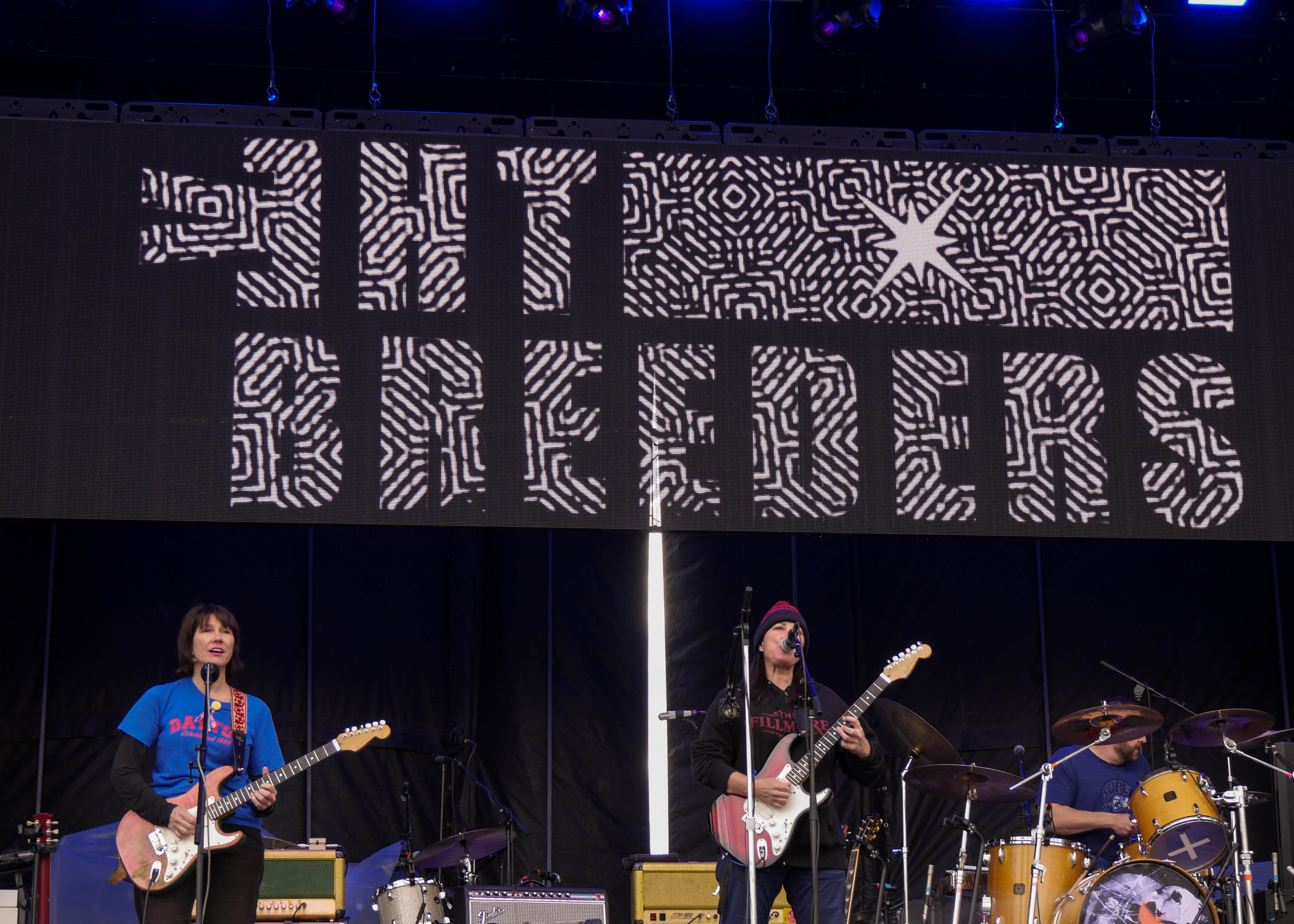
The Breeders are an unusual example of a band with multiple female instrumentalists and one male instrumentalist

A mixed-gender band is a musical group in popular music that is composed of both male and female musicians, including instrumentalists, and is not entirely limited to vocalists, the latter being a co-ed group. Historically, such arrangements have been rare, with a substantial majority of bands being all male. This has been attributed to both social pressures making males more likely to take up musical instruments typical of a band such as guitars and drums, and the history of forming bands as an exercise in male bonding. The most common format for mixed-gender bands is a lineup of male instrumentalists with one female member as lead vocalist. A smaller number of mixed-gender bands feature multiple female members, or female members performing primarily as instrumentalists.

== History and reception ==
All-male bands are the most common in many rock and pop scenes, with all-female bands being substantially less common, and historically often viewed as a novelty rather than as serious musicians. Mixed-gender bands occupy a numerical middle-ground between them, with one source noting that "few bands in rock history have achieved a gender balance in the mix of musicians". In the 1960s pop music scene, "[s]inging was sometimes an acceptable pastime for a girl, but playing an instrument...simply wasn't done". "The rebellion of rock music was largely a male rebellion; the women—often, in the 1950s and '60s, girls in their teens—in rock usually sang songs as personæ utterly dependent on their macho boyfriends...". Philip Auslander says that "Although there were many women in rock by the late 1960s, most performed only as singers, a traditionally feminine position in popular music". Though some women played instruments in American all-female garage rock bands, none of these bands achieved more than regional success. So they "did not provide viable templates for women's on-going participation in rock". When singer and bass guitarist Suzi Quatro emerged in 1973, "no other prominent female musician worked in rock simultaneously as a singer, instrumentalist, songwriter, and bandleader". According to Auslander, she was "kicking down the male door in rock and roll and proving that a female musician ... and this is a point I am extremely concerned about ... could play as well if not better than the boys".

In relation to the gender composition of heavy-metal bands in particular, it has been said that "[h]eavy metal performers are almost exclusively male" "...[a]t least until the mid-1980s" apart from "...exceptions such as Girlschool". However, "...now [in the 2010s] maybe more than ever–strong metal women have put up their dukes and got down to it", "carv[ing] out a considerable place for [them]selves."

As of 2014, it was noted that "few women have ever been allowed entrée into the male rock band and certainly not on equal footing with the male players". In 2017, The Guardian noted that a substantial majority of popular music bands (as opposed to solo performers) were still composed of an all-male lineup, and that in examining 370 performances in the country on a typical day "of the 82 mixed-gender acts, just under three-quarters contain no more than one woman in the line-up". With the proliferation of all-male and all-female bands, it has been suggested that society may "tend to overlook bands made up of mixed gendered members", but that "there have been numerous mixed gendered bands who have made immense impact in the music industry".

Some bands have had female members for only a short portion of their existence, such as the Beastie Boys, for whom Kate Schellenbach was the drummer until 1984, when she was fired due to her not fitting into the band's new dynamic as it shifted from punk music to hip hop. The Smashing Pumpkins went through a succession of female bass players—D'arcy Wretzky, Melissa Auf der Maur, Nicole Fiorentino, and Ginger Pooley.

As of 2024, the best-selling mixed-gender band of all time is ABBA, followed by Fleetwood Mac, both featuring multiple male and female performers in their lineups.

== Common configurations ==
The most common configuration of a mixed-gender band is one with several male musicians and one female lead singer. The history of rock has been described as including "a myriad of collectives in which a strong female voice provides the group's identity while being supported by male backing musicians". While some female musicians "have negotiated gender as vocalists in a band, other women vocalists have constructed their identities as solo artists for whom bands are accompaniment". Jason Lipshutz and Hannah Dailey, in a piece for Billboard wrote that there is "something magical about watching a female artist lead the charge with a group of guys standing behind her onstage".

Women as instrumentalists without lead singing roles in mixed-gender bands are substantially less common. "While the women out front grappled with their various presentations and representations, the women in the band, the instrumentalists, grappled with invisibility and marginalization within their own bands. Professional women instrumentalists are particularly uncommon in rock genres such as heavy metal, for which "playing in a band is largely a male homosocial activity, that is, learning to play in a band is largely a peer-based... experience, shaped by existing sex-segregated friendship networks. Rock music "...is often defined as a form of male rebellion vis-à-vis female bedroom culture". In popular music, a gendered "distinction between public (male) and private (female) participation" in music has existed. "[S]everal scholars have argued that men exclude women from bands or from the bands' rehearsals, recordings, performances, and other social activities", with women being considered "passive and private consumers of allegedly slick, prefabricated – hence, inferior – pop music..., excluding them from participating as high-status rock musicians." One of the reasons that mixed-gender bands rarely exist is that "bands operate as tight-knit units in which homosocial solidarity – social bonds between people of the same sex... – plays a crucial role".

== Notable examples ==
Notable mixed-gender bands include:

=== Duos ===
- Ashford & Simpson
- Blood Red Shoes
- Beach House
- Best Coast
- The Carpenters
- Dear Rouge
- The Dresden Dolls
- Eurythmics
- The Ghost of a Saber Tooth Tiger
- Karmin
- The Kills
- Madisen Ward and the Mama Bear
- Magdalena Bay
- Roxette
- She & Him
- Sleigh Bells
- The Ting Tings
- The White Stripes

=== Trios ===
- Band of Skulls
- Big Thief
- Boris
- Built to Spill
- Cocteau Twins
- Lady A
- Lisa Lisa and Cult Jam
- London Grammar
- N-Dubz
- Paramore
- Rush (post–2025)
- Saint Etienne
- Sick Puppies
- That dog.
- The Band Perry
- The Dream Academy
- The Human League
- Yeah Yeah Yeahs

=== Quartets ===
- A Perfect Circle
- ABBA
- Ace of Base
- Against Me!
- Alabama Shakes
- The B-52s
- Bikini Kill
- Black Eyed Peas
- Black Flag (1983–1985)
- Black Lips
- Blondie
- The Breeders
- Chic
- Coal Chamber
- The Corrs
- The Cranberries
- Crystal Castles
- Dance Hall Crashers
- The Dandy Warhols
- The Dead Weather
- Death Valley Girls
- Echosmith
- Evanescence
- Fitz and the Tantrums
- Five Iron Frenzy
- Florence and the Machine
- Flyleaf
- Frankie and the Witch Fingers
- Garbage
- Guano Apes
- Halestorm
- Heartless Bastards
- Hole
- Hunx and His Punx
- Hurray for the Riff Raff
- Illuminati Hotties
- In This Moment
- The Interrupters
- Katrina and the Waves
- Lush
- Måneskin
- Metric
- Miami Sound Machine
- Mindless Self Indulgence
- My Bloody Valentine
- New Order
- The New Pornographers
- The Naked Brothers Band
- No Doubt
- Pale Waves
- The Pixies
- Pom Pom Squad
- The Pretenders
- The Pretty Reckless
- Pulp
- Said the Whale
- Scandal
- Screaming Females
- Shannon and the Clams
- Silversun Pickups
- Siouxsie and the Banshees
- Slow Pulp
- The Smashing Pumpkins
- Sonic Youth
- Starbenders
- Superchick
- Talking Heads
- Tonight Alive
- The Velvet Underground
- X
- X-Ray Spex
- Yumi Zouma
- Zazen Boys

=== Five or more performers ===
- Amaranthe
- Arcade Fire
- Arch Enemy
- Black Country, New Road
- DragonForce (since 2022)
- Fleetwood Mac
- Franz Ferdinand
- Guns N' Roses (post–2016)
- The Hamilton Face Band
- Hardline (since 2011)
- Heart
- Incubus (since 2024)
- Jefferson Airplane
- Jefferson Starship
- The Julie Ruin
- Linkin Park
- MisterWives
- Mostly Autumn
- New Power Generation
- New Years Day
- Nightwish
- Of Monsters and Men
- The Polyphonic Spree
- Quarterflash
- The Revolution
- Rita Lee & Tutti Frutti
- S Club 7
- Selena Gomez & the Scene
- Slowdive
- Sly and the Family Stone
- Steps
- Tedeschi Trucks Band
- Tom Tom Club
- Wet Leg
- Within Temptation

=== Fictional ===
- The Archies, from Archie Comics
- Big Fun, from Heathers
- Blue Wells from Fuuka
- The Clash at Demonhead, from Scott Pilgrim vs. the World
- Daisy Jones & the Six
- Downtown Sasquatch, from Degrassi: The Next Generation
- The Fallen Moon from Fuuka
- Gorillaz
- Hep Alien, from Gilmore Girls
- The Heights
- Jabberjaw and the Neptunes, from Jabberjaw
- Jesse and the Rippers, from Full House
- Lemonade Mouth
- The Partridge Family
- Sex Bob-Omb, from Scott Pilgrim vs. the World
- The Stingers, from Jem
- Zack Attack, from Saved by the Bell
