= Kimberly Schlapman =

American country music singer (born 1969)

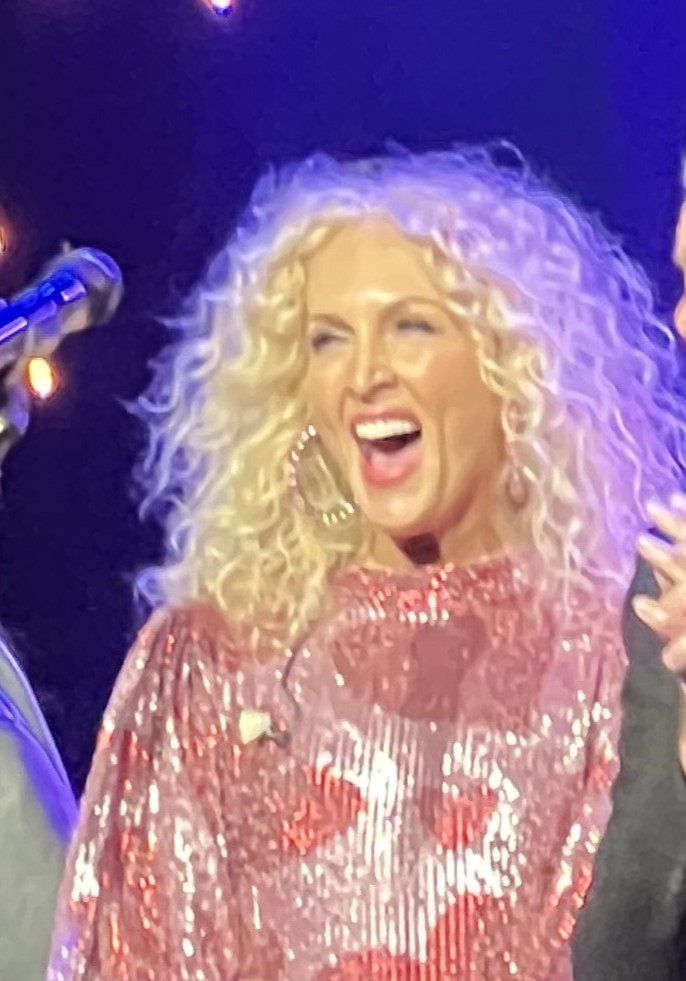
- Schlapman in 2024

Background information
- Also known as: Kimberly Roads
- Born: Kimberly A. Bramlett; October 15, 1969 (age 57); Toccoa, Georgia, US
- Origin: Cornelia, Georgia, US
- Genre: Country
- Occupations: Singer; songwriter; record producer; author
- Instruments: Vocals; tambourine
- Years active: 1998–present
- Labels: Mercury Nashville; Monument; Equity; Capitol Nashville
- Member of: Little Big Town
- Spouses: Steven Wayne Roads (m. 1990; deceased 2005) Stephen Schlapman (m. 2006)
- Website: www.kimberlyschlapman.com

Kimberly Bramlett Schlapman (born October 15, 1969), also formerly known as Kimberly Roads, is an American country music singer and songwriter. She is known as one of the founding members of Little Big Town.

== Early life ==
Kimberly A. Bramlett was born in Toccoa, Georgia on October 15, 1969, and raised in Cornelia, Georgia. She has a younger sister, Paula, and a younger brother, Joshua.

Her mother, Barbara, was a kindergarten and second grade teacher at Demorest Elementary School, each for 15 years, which Schlapman also attended. Her father, Tolbert, worked for the telephone company. She came from a very musical family; her mother was the church organ player at Demorest Baptist Church, and her father sang and played multiple instruments. She started taking piano lessons at age 8, and became her church's piano player at age 11 when their regular pianist left for another church. She began dreaming of a singing career at age 12.

She attended Habersham Central High School, and graduated in 1987. During high school, she was very involved in extracurricular activities, including volunteering as a candy striper at the Habersham County Medical Center, member of Youth Against Cancer, the Fellowship of Christian Athletes, the Student Advisory Board for Community Bank and Trust, the Key Club, the Y Club, and the Student Council. She also served as her senior class vice president, and was a member of her school's chorus group and concert choir. She was selected to sing in the Georgia All-State Chorus for five consecutive years, and performed in the Habersham Community Theater and other special events in the community. Between her junior and senior years of high school, she was selected as one of six sopranos to attend the Georgia Governor's Honors Program at Valdosta State University for vocal music. She received a music scholarship to Samford University, where she studied music. She was also a member of the Phi Mu Fraternity Alpha Gamma chapter.

While at Samford, she met Steven Roads, a law student, and they were married in 1990. Roads got a job as general counsel of the UT Medical Center after their wedding, and the couple moved to Knoxville. Schlapman transferred to the University of Tennessee, where she earned a degree in family and human development. The couple moved to Nashville in late 1995 to pursue Schlapman's music career. Schlapman worked as a waitress during this time.

== Little Big Town ==
Schlapman met Karen Fairchild during their first week at Samford University on a bus to choir camp, bonding over both being from Georgia and mutual friends. They became close friends, even after Schlapman moved to Knoxville, and continued to sing together every summer at the Methodist Conference Center in Lake Junalaska, North Carolina. Fairchild had moved to Nashville in 1994 to pursue a music career. After reuniting in Nashville, the two decided to form a mixed-gender quartet in 1998.

== Other ventures ==
Schlapman was the host of her own cooking show, Kimberly's Simply Southern, for three seasons from 2012-2015. She is the author of a cookbook, Oh Gussie!, released in 2015, and a children's Christmas book, A Dolly for Christmas, released in 2020 about her family's adoption story.

== Personal life ==
In 1990, Schlapman married Steven Roads, a law student whom she met while at Samford University. They struggled with infertility, and were unable to get pregnant. Schlapman was told that due to endometriosis, pregnancy was unlikely. Roads died from a heart attack at home in April 2005 at the age of 41, while Little Big Town was on a radio tour in Indianapolis.

She married Stephen Schlapman, who she calls "Schlap", on November 28, 2006. He was previously Little Big Town's stage manager. They eloped in Las Vegas six months earlier. She became pregnant with their daughter on their honeymoon, which Schlapman credits as a wedding gift from her late husband from heaven. She gave birth to Daisy Pearl Schlapman on July 27, 2007, almost four weeks early while on tour in Phoenix. They tried for further biological children starting in 2009, but resulted in a miscarriage. In 2011, they began fertility treatments, including medication, artificial insemination and in vitro fertilization, but remained unsuccessful. They began the adoption process in 2016, and welcomed a daughter, Dolly Grace Schlapman, to their family on December 31, 2016 through private adoption.

== Discography ==
Little Big Town studio albums

- Little Big Town (2002)
- The Road to Here (2005)
- A Place to Land (2007)
- The Reason Why (2010)
- Tornado (2012)
- Pain Killer (2014)
- Wanderlust (2016)
- The Breaker (2017)
- Nightfall (2020)
- Mr. Sun (2022)
- The Christmas Record (2024)
