= Karen Fairchild =

American singer-songwriter (born 1969)

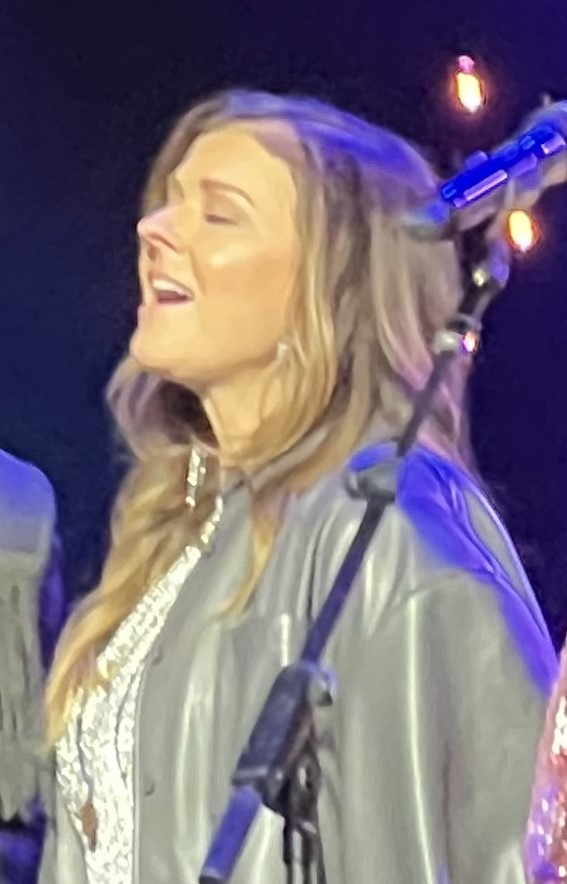
- Fairchild in 2024

Background information
- Also known as: Karen Childers
- Born: Karen Renee Fairchild; September 28, 1969 (age 56); Gary, Indiana, US
- Origin: Marietta, Georgia, US
- Genres: Country; Christian rock
- Occupations: Singer; songwriter; record producer; manager
- Instruments: Vocals; tambourine
- Years active: 1995–present
- Labels: Integrity; Mercury Nashville; Monument; Equity; Capitol Nashville
- Member of: Little Big Town
- Formerly of: Truth; KarenLeigh
- Spouses: Mark Childers (div. 2002) Jimi Westbrook (m. 2006)
- Website: karenfairchild.com

Karen Renee Fairchild (born September 28, 1969) is an American country music singer and songwriter. She is known as one of the founding members of Little Big Town.

== Early life ==
Karen Renee Fairchild was born on September 28, 1969, in Gary, Indiana, and lived in Griffith and Schererville for the first 13.5 years of her life. She has an older sister, Kelley, and a younger brother, Kent.

Her father, Butch, is from Oneida, Tennessee, and worked in sales. Her mother, Brenda, is from Geraldine, Alabama. Her parents were high school sweethearts, and moved to Indiana for her father's work before Fairchild was born. They later moved to Marietta, Georgia, where Fairchild graduated from Lassiter High School.

== Little Big Town ==
Fairchild met Kimberly Schlapman during their first week at Samford University on a bus to choir camp, bonding over both being from Georgia and mutual friends. They became close friends, even after Schlapman moved to Knoxville, and continued to sing together every summer at the Methodist Conference Center in Lake Junalaska, North Carolina. Fairchild moved to Nashville in 1994 to pursue a music career. After reuniting in Nashville when Schlapman also moved in 1995, the two decided to form a mixed-gender quartet in 1998.

== Discography ==
KarenLeigh studio albums

- KarenLeigh (1995)

Little Big Town studio albums

- Little Big Town (2002)
- The Road to Here (2005)
- A Place to Land (2007)
- The Reason Why (2010)
- Tornado (2012)
- Pain Killer (2014)
- Wanderlust (2016)
- The Breaker (2017)
- Nightfall (2020)
- Mr. Sun (2022)
- The Christmas Record (2024)

=== Featured singles ===
Year	Title	Peak chart positions					Album
Year	Title	US	US Country Songs	US Country Airplay	CAN	CAN Country	Album
2015	"Home Alone Tonight" (Luke Bryan with Karen Fairchild)	38	3	1	55	1	Kill the Lights
