= Wayne Kirkpatrick =

American songwriter and musician

- Born: Obed Wayne Kirkpatrick Jr. Baton Rouge, Louisiana, U.S.
- Genres: Country; Pop; Christian
- Education: Baton Rouge Magnet High School
- Known for: "Change the World"; Something Rotten! (2015); Mrs. Doubtfire (2020)
- Relatives: Karey Kirkpatrick (brother)
- Awards: GMA Dove Producer of the Year (1993)

Obed Wayne Kirkpatrick Jr. is an American songwriter and musician born in Greenville, MS, who now lives in Nashville, Tennessee. He graduated from Baton Rouge Magnet High School in 1979. His younger brother is American screenwriter and director Karey Kirkpatrick.

Kirkpatrick is known for providing background vocals, playing guitar, playing keyboards or writing songs for other artists. Writing in Contemporary Christian, Country, and Pop styles, his songs have been recorded by Little Big Town, Faith Hill, Garth Brooks, Babyface, Amy Grant, Rich Mullins, Joe Cocker, Kathy Mattea, Martina McBride, Wynonna Judd, Trisha Yearwood, Bonnie Raitt, Susan Ashton, Michael W. Smith, Jill Phillips, Michael Crawford, Peter Frampton, Casting Crowns and Eric Clapton, whose version of Kirkpatrick's "Change the World" won the Grammy Award for Song of the Year.

At the 24th GMA Dove Awards, Kirkpatrick received the award for Producer of the Year.

In 2005, Kirkpatrick started to produce Little Big Town alongside the group starting with their second album The Road to Here and also the next two A Place to Land and The Reason Why. He also co-wrote most of the songs on all three albums with the group.

Also in 2005, The Road to Here came out for Little Big Town. Kirkpatrick has writing credit on 12 of the 13 songs. He has solo writing credits on one song, "Looking for the Reason", with the rest written with him and part/all of the group or with other songwriters. He co-wrote with group members on their highest-charting song "Bring It On Home", which made it to No. 4 on Hot Country 100 songs chart. Kirkpatrick also wrote Little Big Town's 'signature' song, "Boondocks", which they use as the closing song at every show.

In 2007, Little Big Town and Kirkpatrick went back into the studio to make a new record, A Place to Land. He co-wrote 12 of the 16 tracks on the Deluxe Edition, including the first song that Little Big Town sang together called "Love Profound".

In 2010, the newest record from Little Big Town, The Reason Why, was released which Kirkpatrick co-produced. The record debuted at No. 1, a first for Little Big Town. He co-wrote 7 of the 12 songs with the group, including the hit "Little White Church".

Kirkpatrick has said that Karen Fairchild, Jimi Westbrook, Kimberly Schlapman and Philip Sweet have made him feel like the fifth member of the band.

In 2000, Kirkpatrick released a solo project entitled The Maple Room that included "Wrapped Up in You", a song that would later become a hit for Garth Brooks, and "My Armageddon", which was originally slated for Brooks' Garth Brooks in ... The Life of Chris Gaines project. Kirkpatrick served as a primary songwriter on that album, along with Gordon Kennedy and Tommy Sims.

Later in 2000, he teamed up with Kennedy and several other songwriters (Phil Madeira and Billy Sprague) to record Coming From Somewhere Else, which was a CD of their own music that had previously been recorded by other artists, including "Change the World".

Around 2010, Wayne and his brother Karey began working on the musical Something Rotten!. In 2015, they were nominated for a Tony Award for Best Original Score (Music and/or Lyrics) Written for the Theatre (along with many other awards), while Karey was also nominated for a Tony Award for Best Book of a Musical with British author John O'Farrell.

In 2018, it was announced that Wayne and his brother Karey were working together on the score for the musical adaptation of Mrs. Doubtfire, based on the film of the same name. The show previewed on Broadway in 2020 and closed in 2022.

In September 2023, Kirkpatrick and songwriter and musician Don Chaffer were announced to be working on a musical based on the Bluebird Café in Nashville.
