= Equity Music Group =

American record label

- Founded: 2003
- Founder: Clint Black
- Defunct: 2008
- Status: Inactive
- Distributor: E1 Entertainment
- Country of origin: United States
- Location: Nashville, Tennessee
- Official website: equitymusicgroup.com

Equity Music Group was an American country music record label founded in 2003 by singer Clint Black. The label was distributed by Koch Entertainment (now E1 Entertainment).

The name "Equity" was chosen to represent the equality between the artist and the label. According to Equity, "The artists will own what they create and get paid from the first scanned sale. In turn, the label has a vested interest in other aspects of the artist's career." The label closed in December 2008 due to financial difficulties.

== Artist roster ==
The following acts were signed to Equity Music Group:

- Clint Black
- Laura Bryna
- Carolina Rain
- Kevin Fowler
- Carolyn Dawn Johnson
- Shannon Lawson
- Little Big Town
- Mark Wills
- Blake Wise
