= Heartland (2026 film) =

Thriller film by Shana Feste

- Release poster
- Directed by: Shana Feste
- Screenplay by: Shana Feste
- Produced by: Peter Chernin; Jenno Topping; Randall Poster; Jason Owen
- Starring: Jessica Chastain; Garrett Hedlund; Carter Faith; Ross Lynch; Paul Sparks; Jennifer Nettles; John Hawkes
- Cinematography: Khalid Mohtaseb
- Edited by: Dominic LaPerriere
- Music by: Danny Bensi; Saunder Jurriaans
- Production companies: Chernin Entertainment; Sandbox Studios
- Distributed by: Netflix
- Release date: November 13, 2026
- Running time: 114 minutes
- Country: United States
- Language: English

Heartland is a 2026 American mystery thriller film written and directed by Shana Feste, and starring Jessica Chastain as a former country singer who returns to Nashville in search of her missing niece. Garrett Hedlund, Carter Faith, Ross Lynch, Paul Sparks, Jennifer Nettles, and John Hawkes also star. It was released on Netflix on November 13, 2026 and received mixed reviews from critics.

== Plot ==
Misty Jones, a former country singer who lives an isolated existence with her dogs in Georgia, is contacted by her brother Donny, with whom she has a strained relationship. Donny asks her to use her connections in Nashville to find out what has happened to his daughter Charlie, a rising country pop star who he hasn't heard from for several days. Misty reluctantly agrees and drives to her former home, forcing her to reflect on her troubled career. She reconnects with her friend Buck, who introduces her to Roy Combs, a record label owner who discovered Charlie, and tells her Charlie had been acting out. She files a missing persons report, but the police state that Charlie has a habit of going missing for days at a time before showing up unharmed.

Misty goes on Roger Lane's talk show to speak about Charlie's disappearance, where he reveals that Misty is actually her biological mother. At Charlie's house, Misty finds blood on the bedroom carpet, a piece of paper with some numbers written on it, and a song Charlie was working on that Misty is convinced explains what happened to her. She confronts Charlie's manager Kelly for overworking and exploiting her. Seeing his truck on CCTV footage the night she disappeared, Misty confronts Charlie's boyfriend Jace, but he denies any wrongdoing, is also convinced she is missing of her own accord and reveals that their relationship is a PR stunt. He also chastises Misty for not being part of Charlie's life. Misty confesses to Donny and the police that Charlie visited her a month prior to her disappearance but that she turned her away. Roy admits that Misty's music helped him get through his struggles with gambling, and Misty explains that she felt Donny could give Charlie a better life due to her alcoholism and her desire to focus on her career, which subsequently cratered and caused her to leave Nashville.

An armed intruder tries to attack Roy and Misty, but escapes, with Roy suspecting it is Jared Granger, a man who was previously charged with stalking Charlie. Misty investigates the home of Jared's grandmother and is attacked by Jared, who denies doing anything to Charlie before being shot by Roy. Charlie's blood is found on a sweatshirt in Jared's shed, and the police tell Misty they are now considering that Charlie may have been murdered, though Misty angrily disputes this.

After realizing the numbers she found in Charlie's house link to a football bet, Misty goes to Roy's home and finds the truck that picked Charlie up when she went missing. Misty tells the police that Roy is responsible, but they brush her off.

When she returns home, she finds Charlie, who explains that she faked her own death to escape the pressures of fame, and confesses that Roy tried to blackmail with nude photographs that he forced her to let him take when she was younger in exchange for advancing her career. Charlie states that the police talked her out of going public with the information, and that he tried to kill her to stop her ruining his reputation. She adds that Roy took out an insurance policy on her so that he will profit from her death and will be able to save his house from foreclosure.

Charlie begs Misty to take her away from Nashville, but she instead takes her to the home of Winnie, her former musical rival, to hide out. Buck admits to Misty that he was aware of Roy's actions and attempts to kill her on Roy's orders, but she escapes. Winnie publicly reveals that Misty took the blame for her husband's domestic abuse, which caused her career downturn, and invites her to sing with her as a way to lure out Roy. Winnie then drags Roy onto the stage, allowing Misty time to find evidence of his guilt. Misty shoots out the tire on Roy's car, severely injuring him, cuts off his finger, and recovers his laptop, which she gives to Charlie, imploring her to come forward about the sexual exploitation so Roy can be sent to prison. Misty then visits her ex-husband Clark, and the two make peace with their decision to give up Charlie.

Misty is subsequently arrested for attempted murder. Charlie goes onto Roger's show to share her story, supported by Donny, and states that she and several other artists are pressing charges against Roy. When she is released, Misty attends Charlie's performance at the Bluebird Café.

== Cast ==
- Jessica Chastain as Misty Jones, a former country singer whose career was derailed by alcoholism and her confrontational behaviour
  - Isabelle Kusman as young Misty
- Garrett Hedlund as Roy Combs, the owner of Live Forever records
- Carter Faith as Charlie Heart, an up-and-coming singer who goes missing
- Ross Lynch as Jace Jacobs, Charlie's boyfriend and a popular singer
- Paul Sparks as Donny, Misty's brother
- Jennifer Nettles as Winnie Jo Lean, a country singer and Misty's former rival
- John Hawkes as Clark Allen West, a songwriter/producer Misty's ex-husband
  - David Rysdahl as young Clark
- Hill Harper as Detective Kinsey
- Norbert Leo Butz as Detective White
- Wynn Everett as Kelly Lovell, Charlie's manager
- Ben Dickey as Buck, Misty's friend who plays in local honky tonks
- Tracy Lawrence as Roger Lane, a Nashville talk show host
- Jayson Warner Smith as Owen, Winnie Jo Lean's manager
- J.P. Edwards as Jared Granger, Charlie's stalker

Additionally, singer-songwriter Jim Lauderdale makes a cameo appearance as Winnie Jo Lean's bandleader.

== Production ==
In September 2025, it was announced that Shana Feste would write and direct Heartland, with Jessica Chastain, John Hawkes and Carter Faith set to star; Netflix would distribute. In October 2025, Garrett Hedlund, Jennifer Nettles, Ross Lynch and Ben Dickey joined the cast. The film is named after the Hailey Whitters song of the same name which appears on her 2020 studio album The Dream and was written by Whitters, Nicolle Galyon, and Forest Whitehead. A cover by Chastain and Nettles is included in the film and features on the soundtrack.

Principal photography began on September 29, 2025, at Shadowbox Studios in Atlanta, under the working title HTLD.

== Music ==
Heartland's soundtrack was overseen by music supervisor Randall Poster and was released via Netflix Music simultaneously with the film on November 13. "Heartland" was released as the lead single a week earlier on November 5. It features fifteen tracks, a mixture of covers and original songs, recorded by the cast as well as by established country artists that were produced by Tofer Brown, Kristian Bush, David Ferguson, Stewart Lerman, Frank Liddell and Eric Masse.

Heartland (Soundtrack from the Netflix Film) track listing
No.	Title	Writer(s)	Performer(s)	Length
1.	"Heartland"	Nicolle Galyon; Hailey Whitters; Forest Whitehead	Jessica Chastain; Jennifer Nettles	3:53
2.	"Heartbreak Country"	Sam Ellis; Ava Suppelsa; Emily Weisband	Ross Lynch	3:45
3.	"Still the Sparrow Sings"	Tofer Brown; Carter Faith; Hillary Lindsey	Carter Faith	4:20
4.	"You're Gonna Burn For That"	Sarah Johns; James Melton; Phil O'Donnell	Nettles	3:09
5.	"Family Ties"	Charles Wesley Godwin	Chastain	4:41
6.	"Ready & Waiting"	Don Schlitz	Carly Pearce	3:55
7.	"Tall Tall Trees"	George Jones; Roger Miller	Channing Wilson	2:34
8.	"The Night We Met"	Devin Dawson; Chris LaCorte; Jordan Minton	Lynch; Faith	3:11
9.	"Too Late For Coffee, Too Early For Beer"	Hawkes; Armando Saenz	John Hawkes; Margo Price	5:02
10.	"A-11"	Hank Cochran	Eddy Dunlap	2:21
11.	"Die With A Secret"	Pete Good; Faith; Emily Falvey	Faith	3:11
12.	"Shut Up and Ride"	Jessi Alexander; Faith; Alyssa Vanderheym	Faith; Skyler Day; Sarah Helbringer	3:02
13.	"Honeycomb"	Trannie Anderson; Jonathan Smith	Faith; Anderson	3:13
14.	"Texas Land"	Roger Cook; Hawkes; David Ferguson; Nikki Lorenzo	Ferguson	2:17
15.	"Shouldn't Have Called"	Clara Park; Steven Schmitt; Emily Wyant	Chastain; Hawkes	2:52
Total length:				51:33

== Release ==
Heartland was released on Netflix on November 13, 2026.

== Reception ==
On the review aggregator website Rotten Tomatoes, 53% of 34 critics' reviews are positive, with an average rating of 5.1/10. Metacritic, which uses a weighted average, assigns the film a score of 53 out of 100, based on 12 critics, indicating "mixed or average" reviews.
