= The Kitchen Tapes =

The Kitchen Tapes may refer to:

- The Kitchen Tapes (Lori McKenna album), a 2003 demo album by Lori McKenna
- The Kitchen Tapes (The Raincoats album), a 1983 live album by The Raincoats
- The Kitchen Tape, a 1992 demo album by Weezer
