= The Tree (album) =

Studio album by Lori McKenna
- Released: July 20, 2018
- Recorded: 2017–18
- Genre: Americana; country folk
- Length: 35:22
- Label: CN
- Producer: Dave Cobb

Lori McKenna chronology
The Bird and the Rifle (2016)	The Tree (2018)	The Balladeer (2020)

Professional ratings
Aggregate scores
Source	Rating
Metacritic	84/100
Review scores
Source	Rating
Exclaim!	8/10
The Guardian	4/5 stars
Paste	8.3/10
PopMatters	8/10

The Tree is the tenth studio album by American singer-songwriter Lori McKenna, released on July 20, 2018, through CN Records. The album was made available to stream in its entirety on July 13, 2018, as part of NPR Music's First Listen series.

== Background ==
McKenna's son Christopher played mellotron alongside Cobb on the track "The Lot Behind St Mary's".

"Happy People" was previously covered by Little Big Town for their 2017 album The Breaker. Cobb played a 12-string Rickenbacker on the track as a tribute to Tom Petty, who died shortly before they recorded it.

Speaking to Boston Globe, McKenna referred to "People Get Old" as the "anchor" of the record but that she felt it was inappropriate for the title of the album, deciding on "The Tree" after recognising how much that song said about family. She explained "I've always been obsessed with trees, weirdly, since I was little. So that was the perfect title in my brain and then, “People Get Old” being inspired by my dad, it just seemed fitting to have this be a record about aging and watching your kids go off and watching your parents age. If you had your kids young enough like I did, you have a point in life where your kids are leaving the house at the same time that your parents start showing signs of needing more help" and added that co-writing the title track with, Natalie Hemby and Aaron Raitiere was a "joyous" experience and that "We wanted it to be about how your family is there for you; even during the times of your life where you are not authentically yourself, you haven’t figured yourself out, that family structure in some silent way is still there for you while you’re figuring it all out. And whether you stay, or you go somewhere else and stay away, or you come back, it’s there for you".

Comparing to her first record with Cobb, The Bird and the Rifle, McKenna said "I think this record is similar in a lot of ways, sonically and band-wise. It’s not as lush, but it sounds a lot like it. I’m not a really diverse writer, so I feel like the songs all run into one another even though the stories change and my goal is to try to get the songs tighter lyrically. I think it’s very similar to the last record. You know, this isn’t a dance record. I haven’t made my dance record yet."

== Critical reception ==
According to the review aggregator Metacritic, The Tree received "universal acclaim" based on a weighted average score of 84 out of 100 from 6 critic scores. Marlo Ashley of Exclaim! said that "Lori McKenna's poetic stanzas are picturesque and her messages are spiritually sacred and sincere", calling her songwriting captivating and fascinating. Michael Hann wrote for The Guardian that Dave Cobb's production and McKenna's lyrics complemented each other well, concluding The Tree to be an "album for grown-ups, contemplative and wise".

== Commercial performance ==
The album debuted at No. 39 on Top Country Albums, and No. 3 on Americana/Folk Album Sales with 4,000 sold, which is her best on the chart. It has sold 5,100 copies as of August 2018.

== Track listing ==
No.	Title	Writer(s)	Length
1.	"A Mother Never Rests"	Barry Dean, Lori McKenna	2:45
2.	"The Fixer"	McKenna	3:28
3.	"People Get Old"	McKenna	3:42
4.	"Young and Angry Again"	Dean, Luke Laird, McKenna	3:37
5.	"The Tree"	Natalie Hemby, McKenna, Aaron Raitiere	3:23
6.	"You Won't Even Know I'm Gone"	McKenna	2:17
7.	"Happy People"	McKenna, Hailey Whitters	3:27
8.	"You Can't Break a Woman"	Hillary Lindsey, McKenna, Liz Rose	3:13
9.	"The Lot Behind St. Mary's"	McKenna	3:30
10.	"The Way Back Home"	Laird, McKenna	3:02
11.	"Like Patsy Would"	Lindsey, McKenna, Rose	2:58
Total length:			35:22

Track length data retrieved from liner notes image on Discogs.

== Personnel ==
- Dave Cobb – producer, guitar, Mellotron
- Anderson East – lead guitar, sequencing
- Natalie Hemby – background vocals
- Hillary Lindsey – background vocals
- Christopher McKenna – Mellotron
- Lori McKenna – lead vocals, backing vocals, acoustic guitar
- Kristen Rogers – background vocals

== Charts ==
Chart (2018)	Peak position
UK Americana Albums (OCC)	8
UK Independent Albums (OCC)	33
US Billboard 200	1
US Top Country Albums (Billboard)	39
US Americana/Folk Albums (Billboard)	9
US Heatseekers Albums (Billboard)	1
US Independent Albums (Billboard)	4
