= Raised =

Studio album by Hailey Whitters
- Released: March 18, 2022
- Genre: Country
- Length: 46:32
- Label: Big Loud; Pigasus
- Producer: Jake Gear; Hailey Whitters

Hailey Whitters chronology
The Dream (2020)	Raised (2022)	I'm in Love (2023)

Singles from Raised
- 1. "Everything She Ain't" Released: June 1, 2022

Raised is the third studio album by American country artist Hailey Whitters. It was released on March 18, 2022, via a partnership between Big Loud and her own imprint, Pigasus.

== Background ==
Heavily inspired by her Midwestern upbringing in Iowa, Whitters has writing credits on all the tracks on Raised, with the exception of "Everybody Oughta", and the album's instrumental intro track ("Ad Astra Per Alas Porci") and its reprise as the album closer. She co-produced the 17-song project with Jake Gear. Whitters felt like her previous album, The Dream, drew largely from her experience in Nashville, Tennessee, but wanted to take things back to her roots with Raised and called it a "celebration of the heartland". She described the song "Heartland" from her previous album as being the "mustard seed" that led to her reminiscing on her hometown and childhood memories. On Raised, Whitters said "these songs are airy, breathe, and organically feel good because there's so much 'rootsiness' in them. That's who I am as a country fan, and that's what I'm bringing to this record".

Its lead single, "Everything She Ain't", was released on June 1, 2022, as Whitters' debut single to country radio.

The album includes a collaboration with American Aquarium on "Middle of America". "Ad Astra Per Alas Porci", the instrumental intro track, lends its name from a Latin phrase meaning "to the stars on the wings of a pig", which serves as an homage to Whitters' imprint Pigasus, a portmanteau of pig and Pegasus.

== Track listing ==
Raised track listing
No.	Title	Writer(s)	Length
1.	"Ad Astra Per Alas Porci"	Jordan Lehning; Pedro Palomino	1:20
2.	"Raised"	Nicolle Galyon; Hailey Whitters; Forest Glen Whitehead	3:19
3.	"Everything She Ain't"	Bryan Simpson; Ryan Tyndell; Whitters	2:31
4.	"Big Family"	Cameron Bedell; Galyon; Whitters	3:29
5.	"Middle of America" (featuring American Aquarium)	Jake Gear; Bobby Pinson; Whitters	3:11
6.	"Plain Jane"	Cary Barlowe; Hillary Lindsey; Whitters	3:28
7.	"College Town"	Galyon; Ashley Gorley; Luke Laird; Shane McAnally; Jimmy Robbins; Whitters	3:08
8.	"Interlude"	Palomino; Whitters	0:51
9.	"Boys Back Home"	Brandy Clark; Jessie Jo Dillon; Whitters	3:16
10.	"Everybody Oughta"	Matt Roy; Craig Wiseman	3:42
11.	"Pretty Boy"	Scooter Carusoe; Tom Douglas; Whitters	2:51
12.	"The Neon"	Rodney Clawson; Lori McKenna; Whitters	3:34
13.	"The Grassman"	Aaron Raitiere; Whitters	0:20
14.	"Our Grass Is Legal"	Whitters	4:12
15.	"Beer Tastes Better"	McKenna; Whitters	3:20
16.	"In a Field Somewhere"	Jeff Hyde; Simpson; Whitters	3:31
17.	"Ad Astra Per Alas Porci (Reprise)"	Lehning; Palomino	0:20
Total length:			46:32
