= Bittertown =

Studio album by Lori McKenna
- Released: May 11, 2004
- Studio: Signature Sounds
- Genres: Folk; country
- Labels: Signature Sounds; Warner Bros.
- Producer: Lorne Entress

Lori McKenna chronology
The Kitchen Tapes (2003)	Bittertown (2004)	Unglamorous (2007)

Professional ratings
Review scores
Source	Rating
AllMusic	4/5 stars

Bittertown is the fourth studio album by American singer-songwriter Lori McKenna. The album was first released May 11, 2004 by Signature Sounds, and re-released in 2005 on Warner Bros. Records following strong positive responses from musicians and critics. Bittertown propelled McKenna to music industry prominence as a singer and songwriter whose honest songs about parenting and marriage were acclaimed by country singer Faith Hill, and whose lyrics about working class town life drew comparisons to Bruce Springsteen.

== Recording ==
Preceding Bittertown, the 2003 album The Kitchen Tapes was recorded by McKenna on a MiniDisc device while sitting at her kitchen table. McKenna later recalled her lack of recording experience, saying in 2007: "We went in to make Bittertown with Lorne (Entress), who produced it, and he played drums and a zillion other instruments, and Kevin Barry who played bass and guitar, and it was sort of just the three of us. It was sort of a long studio experience, but it was necessary for it to take that long because I was just learning." The album was recorded at a small Northampton, Massachusetts studio, Signature Sounds Recordings. Signature co-founder Jim Olson was eager to record McKenna, who he recognized as a singular talent after listening to her first albums. Olson remarked about recording Bittertown:

This was more hard-edged, more honest. She was almost the female Springsteen -- and it was very exciting to hear, because there she was sitting at her kitchen table with the songs just pouring out of her. This was something different....She was looking back at this full life from the perspective of a mature person. The songs were really, really good, and the demos were just as moving: just Lori and her guitar and that voice. You'd be an idiot not to hear it.

== Breakthrough ==
An initial review in the weekly Miami New Times found McKenna on Bittertown "using riveting melodies to etch an indelible impression" as writer Lee Zimmerman raved about the album: "Insightful and compelling, Bittertown is home to dashed fortunes and troubled memories. McKenna’s tangled tales provide a postcard from the edge." Also impressed by her work, Boston folk music veteran Mary Gauthier began touting McKenna to music executives, eventually visiting the office of Melanie Howard, who had taken over the business of her husband Nashville songwriter and publisher Harlan Howard after his death in 2002. After listening to a few tracks from Bittertown provided by Gauthier and speaking with McKenna on the phone, Howard passed the songs to music executive Missi Gallimore. Gallimore and husband producer Byron Gallimore had dinner with Tim McGraw and his wife Faith Hill that evening, and Hill was moved enough by the songs to immediately change plans for her upcoming album Fireflies so she could record some of the songs on Bittertown for her own album.

For Fireflies, Hill recorded the title song "Fireflies", found on McKenna's 2001 album Pieces of Me, along with "Stealing Kisses", "If You Ask", and the digital bonus track "Lone Star", all from Bittertown. Hill wrote comments about each song on Fireflies on her website, saying about "If You Ask"

That’s the first one of Lori McKenna’s songs that I heard. I said, 'I’ve never heard writing like this.' It was like a dagger in my heart -- the pain and anguish and the power of her storytelling. That song hit me right in my soul. It was so honest. It’s a peek into a very serious subject matter and I’d never heard the subject of living with an alcoholic written about in that way.

Hill further explained her reasons for recording four of McKenna's songs: "For a woman who never really left her hometown, McKenna's songwriting transcends regionalism. Her songs find the common ground in contemporary America's post-industrial landscape." Hill took McKenna under her guidance, and invited her to a planned appearance on The Oprah Winfrey Show in October 2005, as well as having McKenna appear as opening act on the upcoming Soul2Soul II Tour with Tim McGraw, which eventually broke the record for highest grossing country tour. After working with McGraw and Hill, Warner Bros. subsequently signed McKenna to a recording contract and reissued Bittertown on their major label, and McGraw was hired to produce McKenna's 2007 effort, Unglamorous.

In addition to the songs from Bittertown recorded by Faith Hill, "Bible Song" was covered by country singer Sara Evans for her album Real Fine Place. Writing prior to a charity concert for an adoption agency in 2013 which McKenna headlined on Martha's Vineyard, critic Holly Gleason said Bittertown "put the lower middle-class housewife in the company of the nation’s best songwriters as she drew comparisons to Springsteen for her close-to-the-bone narratives, all small details and broken hearts."

== Return to Bittertown ==
In July 2019, McKenna released a 7-inch single album named Return to Bittertown, consisting of “Stealing Kisses” and “Bible Song” which she had re-recorded to commemorate the 15th Anniversary of the release of Bittertown. McKenna also embarked on a tour (Return to Bittertown Tour) to promote this album. In a press release issued prior to the tour, McKenna defined Bittertown as the album release that “changed my life”.

== Track listing ==
All songs written by Lori McKenna

No.	Title	Length
1.	"Bible Song"	3:48
2.	"Mr. Sunshine"	4:03
3.	"One Man"	4:17
4.	"Pour"	3:50
5.	"Lone Star"	4:10
6.	"Stealing Kisses"	4:24
7.	"If You Ask"	4:29
8.	"Monday Afternoon"	3:04
9.	"The Ledge"	3:40
10.	"My Sweetheart"	4:05
11.	"Cowardly Lion"	3:34
12.	"Silver Bus"	4:00
13.	"One Kiss Goodnight"	4:19
Total length:		53:43

== Personnel ==
As listed in the CD booklet:

Musicians

- Lori McKenna – vocals, acoustic guitar (all tracks except 6, 10), resonator guitar (10)
- Kevin Barry – bass (1, 4, 5, 8, 9, 11–13), lap steel (1, 4, 8, 10, 13), mandoguitar (1, 8), mandolin (1), 6 and 12 string electric guitars (2), resonator guitar (7), electric guitar(s) (8, 9, 11–13), piano (10), slide guitar (12)
- Lorne Entress – drums (1, 2, 4, 5, 8, 9, 11–13), high strung guitar (1, 3, 10), synth bass (2), vocals (2, 7), percussion (2, 4, 8, 10, 13), reed organ (3, 7, 10), celestaphone (3, 12), wurlitzer piano (4), keys (5), acoustic guitar (5, 6), bass drum (10), orchestra bells (10)
- Dave Limina – hammond organ (1, 2, 5, 9)
- Duke Levine – electric guitar (1)
- Buddy Miller – vocals (1)
- Meghan Toohey – electric guitar(s) (2, 5), acoustic guitar (5)
- Brian McKenna – electric guitar (2)
- Mark Erelli – acoustic slide guitar (3), vocals (8)
- Chris Trapper – vocals (3)
- Shane Koss – rhythm programming (4, 13)
- Joe Barbato – wurlitzer piano (5, 11, 12)
- Chris Haynes – piano (6)

Production

- Lorne Entress – producer
- Huck Bennert – engineer, mixing
- Mark Donahue – mastering
- Chris Rival – additional recording
- Mark Thayer – additional recording
- Duke Levine – additional recording
- Meghan Dewar – art direction (with Gabriel Unger), design
