= The Balladeer (album) =

Studio album by Lori McKenna
- Released: July 24, 2020
- Length: 37:37
- Label: CN Records
- Producer: Dave Cobb

Lori McKenna chronology
The Tree (2018)	The Balladeer (2020)	1988 (2023)

The Balladeer is the eleventh studio album by American singer-songwriter Lori McKenna. It was released on July 24, 2020, through CN Records and distributed by Thirty Tigers. It was preceded by the release of the lead single "When You're My Age" on May 1, 2020.

== Background ==
The Balladeer was described by McKenna as the "most personal album" of her career. Of the ten tracks featured on it, seven of them she wrote solo while the remaining three were co-written with frequent collaborators Hillary Lindsey and Liz Rose, all of whom are collectively known as the Love Junkies. In an interview with WGBH's Boston Public Radio, McKenna said the following about how the album received its name from what would eventually be the title track: "It's funny, I've heard that term so many times over the years, [...] It struck me one night—that's what I do! [...] The story isn't about me [or] the song itself—but I loved the idea of that being the name of the record."

== Singles ==
On May 1, 2020, the lead single "When You're My Age" was released alongside its music video. Featuring background vocals from Lindsey and Rose, Rolling Stone described it as an "intensely moving piano ballad".

== Critical reception ==
Professional ratings
Aggregate scores
Source	Rating
Metacritic	83/100
Review scores
Source	Rating
AllMusic	4/5 stars
And It Don't Stop	A

Upon its release, The Balladeer received positive acclaim from music critics. At Metacritic, which assigns a normalized rating out of 100 to reviews from critics, the album has an average score of 83 out of 100, which indicates "universal acclaim" based on 5 reviews.

Writing for Americana Highways, John Michael Antonio praised McKenna for "[using] her prodigious lyrical skills and keen storytelling ability to craft [the album's] ten songs" and noting "This Town Is a Woman" along with the album's "heartbreaking and tender" title song "The Balladeer", "Good Fight", "When You're My Age", and "Till You're Grown" as highlights. Ben Salmon of Paste Magazine gave the album an 8.5 rating, further describing it as McKenna's "most upbeat album in recent history" and "lighter and brighter" than her previous two albums The Tree (2018) and The Bird and the Rifle (2016). He further highlighted songs such as "Stuck in High School" and "Til You're Grown", both of which he likened to the material of the Indigo Girls and Brandi Carlile respectively.

Reviewing in his "Consumer Guide" column, Robert Christgau hailed it as "the most consistently top-notch album of her late-blooming career". While highlighting "the unassumingly twisty 'This Town Is a Woman' and the bigamously two-timing 'Two Birds'" for utilizing her past best work's "modest metaphorical complexity", he argued that McKenna often succeeds simply "by returning to familiar themes like her mother's death and marriage's set-tos", leaving listeners convinced that "the corny title of 'When You're My Age' deserves the utopian wish it sets up: 'I hope the world is kinder than it seems to be right now.'"

== Track listing ==
All tracks are written by Lori McKenna.

No.	Title	Length
1.	"This Town Is a Woman" (featuring Karen Fairchild and Kimberly Schlapman)	3:18
2.	"The Balladeer"	3:52
3.	"Marie"	3:33
4.	"The Dream"	4:30
5.	"Uphill"	3:01
6.	"Good Fight"	3:18
7.	"Stuck in High School"	3:12
8.	"When You're My Age" (featuring Hillary Lindsey and Liz Rose)	5:11
9.	"Two Birds"	3:29
10.	"Till You're Grown"	4:13
Total length:		37:37

== Personnel ==
Credits for The Balladeer adapted from Tidal.

- Lori McKenna - lead vocals, acoustic guitar
- Dave Cobb - producer, acoustic guitar, electric guitar, mixing
- Hillary Lindsey - background vocals
- Liz Rose - background vocals
- Karen Fairchild - background vocals (1)
- Kimberly Schlapman - background vocals (1)
- Kristen Rogers - background vocals
- Brian Allen - bass
- Chris Powell - drums
- Philip Towns - harmonium, mellotron, percussion, piano, wurlitzer
- Toby Hulbert - engineer, mixing
- Josh Reynolds - assistant engineer
- Phillip Smith - assistant engineer
- Becky Flute - photography
- Rachel Briggs - design

== Chart performance ==
Chart (2020)	Peak position
US Americana/Folk Albums (Billboard)	25
US Heatseekers Albums (Billboard)	20
