= 1988 (disambiguation) =

1988 was a year in the 20th century.

1988 may also refer to:

- 1988 (number)
- 1988 (Archie Roach album), 2009
- 1988 (Blueprint album), 2005
- 1988 (Knxwledge album), 2020
- 1988 (Lori McKenna album), 2023
- 1988, a 2016 album by Noah
- "1988", a 1998 song by 28 Days from 28 Days
- "1988", a TV episode of La Brea
