= Happy People (Little Big Town song) =

Single by Little Big Town

from the album The Breaker
- Released: April 3, 2017
- Genre: Country pop
- Length: 2:47
- Label: Capitol Nashville
- Songwriters: Lori McKenna; Hailey Whitters
- Producer: Jay Joyce

Little Big Town singles chronology
"Better Man" (2016)	"Happy People" (2017)	"When Someone Stops Loving You" (2017)

"Happy People" is a song recorded by American country group Little Big Town from their eighth studio album, The Breaker (2017). The song was released digitally February 3, 2017, as the album's first promotional single and was released to country radio as the album's second official single on April 3, 2017. "Happy People" was written by Lori McKenna and Hailey Whitters. McKenna later included her own rendition of the song on her 2018 album, The Tree and Whitters recorded a version for her 2020 album, The Dream.

== Content ==
"Happy People" features positive lyrics that encourage kindness and self-actualization. The song is backed by a "driving percussion rhythm" and incorporates influences of pop and folk genres. Perri Blumberg of Rolling Stone wrote that the optimistic lyrics of "Happy People" serve as a thematic counterpoint to previous single, "Better Man". Karen Fairchild sings lead vocals on the song, with harmonies provided by the remaining group members.

== Promotion ==
Little Big Town first performed "Happy People" on The Today Show on February 24, 2017. The group also performed the song at the 2016 ACM Awards on April 2, 2017, which Billboard called "one of the most memorable performances" of the night.

== Critical reception ==
In a review of The Breaker, Annie Reuter of Sounds Like Nashville wrote that the "standout" song "immediately pulls the listener in with its slick beats and memorable lyrics." Glenn Gamboa of Newsday wrote that "Happy People" sounds "more like Rumours-era Fleetwood Mac than the bro country that currently fills country radio," and that its lyrics are "surprisingly poignant."

== Commercial performance ==
"Happy People" debuted at number 56 on the Country Airplay chart dated April 22, 2017. The song debuted at number 47 on the Hot Country Songs chart dated February 25, 2017 from digital downloads. Following its release as a single, it re-entered at number 49 on the chart dated April 15, 2017, and reached a peak of number 40, while it peaked at number 46 on the Country Airplay chart, becoming their lowest-peaking single to date.

== Charts ==
Chart (2017)	Peak position
US Country Airplay (Billboard)	46
US Hot Country Songs (Billboard)	40
