= Humble and Kind =

Single by Tim McGraw

from the album Damn Country Music
- Released: January 20, 2016
- Genre: Country
- Length: 4:20
- Label: Big Machine
- Songwriter: Lori McKenna
- Producers: Byron Gallimore; Tim McGraw

Tim McGraw singles chronology
"Lovin' Lately" (2016)	"Humble and Kind" (2016)	"How I'll Always Be" (2016)

"Humble and Kind" is a song written by Lori McKenna and first released by American country music singer Tim McGraw on January 20, 2016, as the second single from his fourteenth studio album, Damn Country Music. McKenna later recorded her rendition of the song for her eighth studio album, The Bird and the Rifle, released in July 2016. Among several other wins and nominations, the song won the award for Best Country Song at the 59th Annual Grammy Awards, "Video of the Year" at the 2016 CMT Music Awards, "Song of the Year" at 2016 CMA Awards and "Country Song of the Year" at 2016 American Music Awards. It has been certified platinum and reached the number one position on the country music charts in both Canada and the United States.

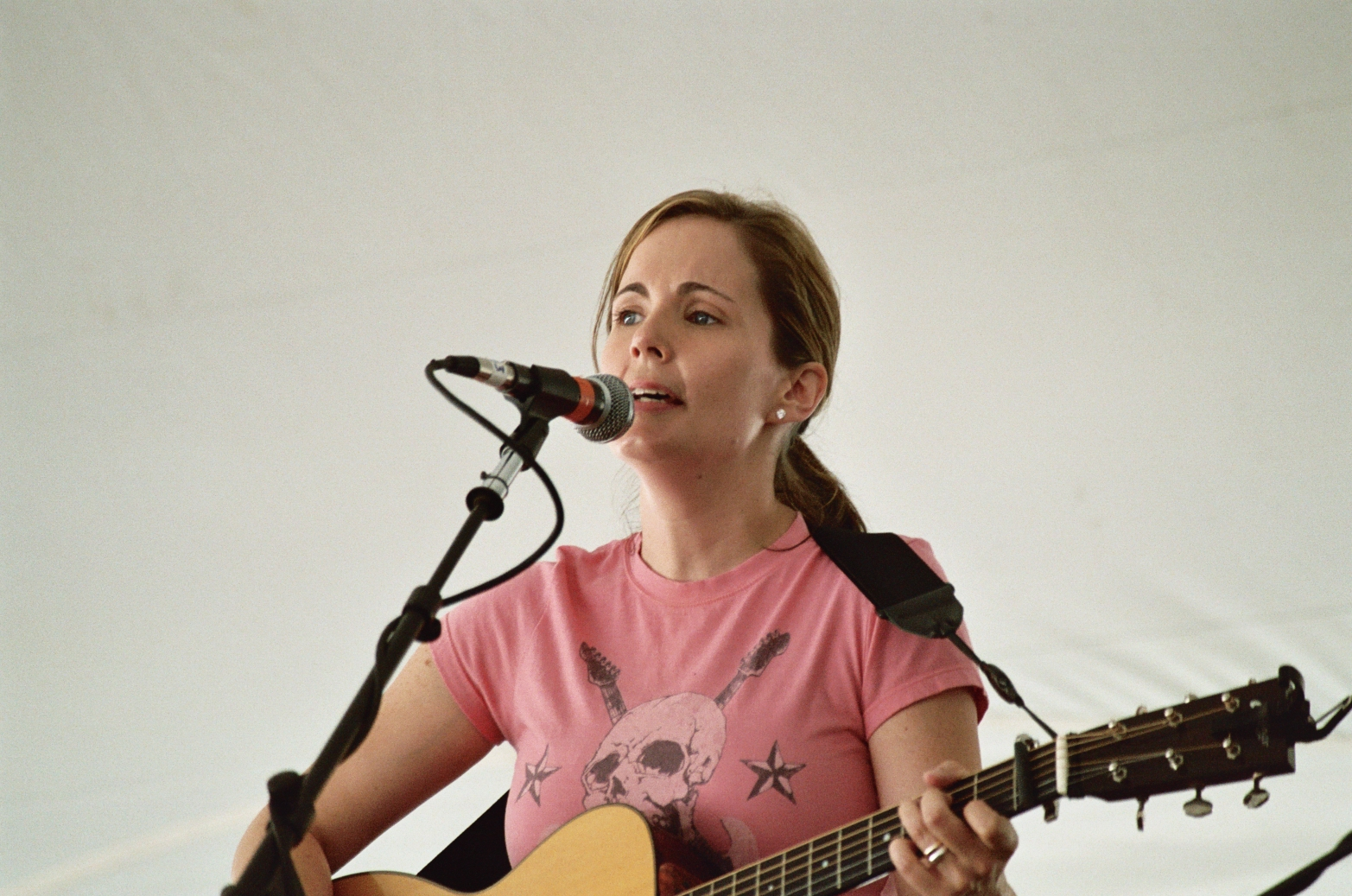
Lori McKenna, the writer of "Humble and Kind".

The song was written by Lori McKenna. In an interview with CMT published in July 2016, McKenna revealed the song was written for her husband and their five kids and is her list of all the things she wanted to make sure she'd told them.

McGraw and frequent collaborator Byron Gallimore co-produced the song.

== Lori McKenna version ==
On July 8, 2016, Lori McKenna released her rendition of "Humble and Kind" as a single from her album, The Bird and the Rifle, released on July 29, 2016.

== Music video ==
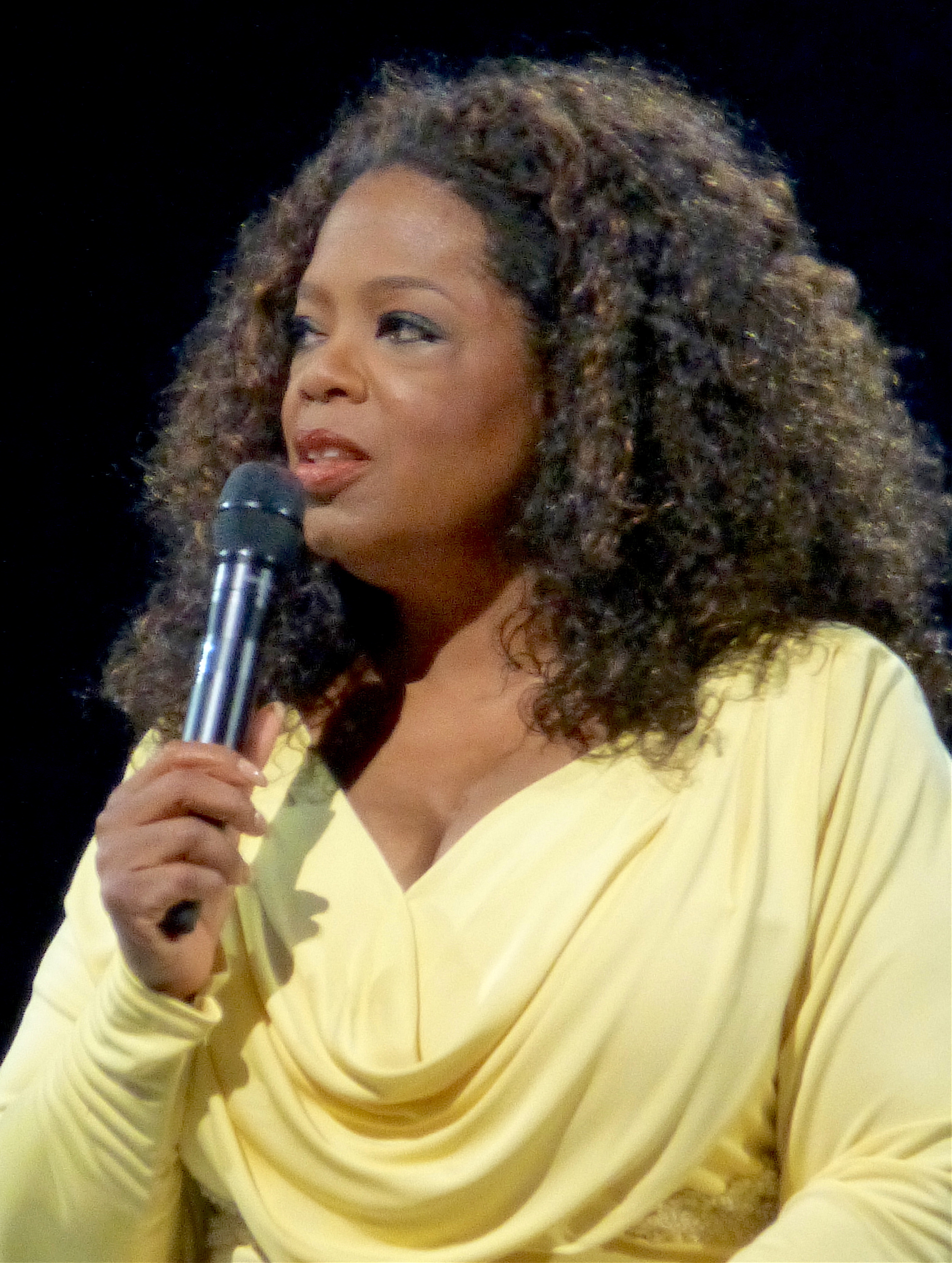
Oprah Winfrey provided footage for the song's music video.

McGraw released the video to the song on his Facebook page on January 21, 2016. At the time of the video release, the song was expected to be released as the second single from the album in early February. The video was the result of a brainstorm McGraw had while running on a treadmill and seeing a 30-second trailer for Oprah Winfrey's Belief series. After taking some initiative, McGraw got Winfrey to make available footage for the video. The video, which was directed by Wes Edwards, featured scenes from around the world from Winfrey's fall 2015 documentary series. The video won the top honor, "Video of the Year", at the 2016 CMT Music Awards.

== Promotion ==
The song and video of "Humble and Kind" has its own website intended to gather related stories about acts of kindness that have been shared with the hashtag #stayhumbleandkind. The day after the music video was released, Winfrey tweeted her approval of the video, saying "TIM, I love this song. Every word feels true." McGraw performed the song on the April 3, 2016 ACM Awards.

== Book ==
A bound edition of "Humble and Kind" was released on May 17, 2016, in conjunction with graduation season by Hachette Books. In addition to the lyrics and illustrations, the book edition features an introduction by McGraw and an epilogue by McKenna. McGraw pledged his book proceeds to the Neighbor's Keeper Fund of the Community Foundation of Middle Tennessee.

== Critical response ==
Chris Parton of Country Weekly described "Humble and Kind"'s video as "the touching, lump-in-your-throat" kind. Stephen L. Betts of Rolling Stone described the video as one that takes "universal scenes of faith and life and combines them with an understated performance from McGraw, captured by a 360-degree turntable lighting rig". According to Christina Vinson of Townsquare Media's blog site, The Boot, the video, which presents a song from the perspective of "a parent sending their child into the world", will resonate across a wide-ranging audience. McGraw, who has three daughters with his wife Faith Hill had just sent his oldest daughter off to college in the fall before the song was released.

=== Accolades ===
Year	Association	Category	Result
2016	CMT Music Awards	Video of the Year	Won
2016	CMA Awards	Song of the Year	Won
2016	American Music Awards	Favorite Country Song	Won
2017	Grammy Awards	Best Country Song	Won
2017	ACM Awards	Video of the Year	Nominated
2017	ACM Awards	Single Record of the Year	Nominated
2017	ACM Awards	Song of the Year	Nominated

== Commercial performance ==
"Humble and Kind" first entered Billboard's Hot Country Songs chart at No. 45 for chart dated February 6, 2016. In late March, the song became McGraw's fifty-second Top 10 country hit. Tim McGraw performed the song at the 2016 ACM Awards, which pushed its sales to 64,000 for the week, as well as the song's ranking to No. 1 on the Hot Country Songs, his 26th No. 1 on the chart. The single was certified Platinum by the Recording Industry Association of America on September 20, 2016. To date, this is McGraw’s most recent number one hit. The song reached its million sales mark in December 2016, and has sold 1,380,000 copies in the US as of November 2019.

== Charts and certifications ==
=== Weekly charts ===
Chart (2016)	Peak position
Canada Hot 100 (Billboard)	37
Canada Country (Billboard)	1
US Billboard Hot 100	30
US Adult Contemporary (Billboard)	13
US Country Airplay (Billboard)	1
US Hot Country Songs (Billboard)	1

=== Year-end charts ===
Chart (2016)	Position
US Billboard Hot 100	96
US Adult Contemporary (Billboard)	34
US Country Airplay (Billboard)	19
US Hot Country Songs (Billboard)	3

=== Certifications ===
Region	Certification	Certified units/sales
Australia (ARIA)	Platinum	70,000^{‡}
Canada (Music Canada)	2× Platinum	160,000^{‡}
United States (RIAA)	4× Platinum	4,000,000
^{‡} Sales+streaming figures based on certification alone.
