= The Kitchen Tapes (Lori McKenna album) =

Studio album by Lori McKenna
- Released: 2003
- Recorded: 2001
- Genre: Folk
- Label: Gyrox
- Producer: Gabriel Unger; Lori McKenna

Lori McKenna chronology
Pieces of Me (2001)	The Kitchen Tapes (2003)	Bittertown (2004)

The Kitchen Tapes is the third album by singer-songwriter Lori McKenna. The album title refers to its recording at McKenna's kitchen table in Stoughton, Massachusetts. McKenna recorded the album in one take in about an hour using a MiniDisc recorder and inexpensive microphone.

== Background ==
Prior to signing a recording contract, Lori McKenna released multiple albums independently on her own Gyrox label. Following the successful independent release of Paper Wings and Halo, which sold nearly 10,000 copies, McKenna released Pieces of Me and The Kitchen Tapes. She recorded the second title on her own, as described in the booklet distributed with the CD:

Most of these songs were recorded in one take on March 17th 2001 in Stoughton, Massachusetts by Lori at her kitchen table from 11:45am-12:57pm with a Sony Minidisc MZ-R37SP player with one Sony ECM-MS907 pocket microphone.

== Recording ==
Writing in liner notes for the album, McKenna describes the realization of it as a "happy accident". The recordings were meant to be purely archival, McKenna did not intend to release them publicly: "I got out my minidisc recorder, a cheap little microphone, and my notebook, filled with a writing binge I went on just after finishing my last album, and then I started to play," and "At the time, I was sure these recordings would stay in this house with me." McKenna goes on to say that she quickly recorded the songs in rough form to avoid forgetting chords and melodies, that she decided to distribute the songs so listeners would learn to appreciate the creative process, and that she likes to think there is beauty in the imperfections captured.

== Track listing ==
All songs written by Lori McKenna except 9 "Fake Plastic Trees" by Colin Greenwood / Jonny Greenwood / Ed O'Brien / Phil Selway / Thom Yorke

No.	Title	Length
1.	"Falter"	4:56
2.	"How to Be Righteous"	4:21
3.	"Bible Song"	4:19
4.	"Jealousy"	4:19
5.	"Beautiful Man"	5:28
6.	"Unfinished Song #57"	3:30
7.	"Dance with the Ladies"	4:32
8.	"The Other Boys"	4:44
9.	"Fake Plastic Trees"	5:00
10.	"You Better"	4:16
11.	"Feeding the Angels"	4:55
12.	"Afternoons"	10:55
Total length:		61:15

== Personnel ==
as listed in the CD booklet

Musicians

- Lori McKenna - acoustic guitar, vocals

Production

- Lori McKenna - producer, recording
- Gabriel Unger - producer
- Keith Richardson - mastering
