= The Dream (Hailey Whitters album) =

Studio album by Hailey Whitters
- Released: February 28, 2020
- Genre: Country
- Length: 43:29
- Label: Pigasus
- Producer: Hailey Whitters

Hailey Whitters chronology
Black Sheep (2015)	The Dream (2020)	Raised (2022)

Singles from The Dream
- 1. "The Days" Released: March 22, 2019

Professional ratings
Review scores
Source	Rating
American Songwriter	4.5/5 stars
Paste	8.3/10

The Dream is the second studio album by American country artist Hailey Whitters. It was released on February 28, 2020, under her own label, Pigasus Records. A deluxe re-issue of the album, titled The Dream: Living the Dream, was released on February 26, 2021.

== Accolades ==
Accolades for The Dream
Publication	Accolade	Rank	Ref.
Paste	Paste's 25 Best Albums of 2020 – Mid-Year	22	
Rolling Stone	Rolling Stone's Best Country and Americana Albums of 2020	6	

== Commercial performance ==
The album sold 300 copies in the US in its first week.

== Track listing ==
The Dream track listing
No.	Title	Writer(s)	Length
1.	"Ten Year Town"	Hailey Whitters; Brandy Clark	3:18
2.	"The Days"	Whitters; Hillary Lindsey; Ben West	3:14
3.	"Red Wine & Blue"	Whitters; Clark; Jessie Jo Dillon	4:18
4.	"Dream, Girl"	Whitters; Dustin Christensen	3:19
5.	"Loose Strings"	Brent Cobb; Erik Dylan; Phillip White	3:05
6.	"Heartland"	Whitters; Nicolle Galyon; Forest Whitehead	3:31
7.	"Janice at the Hotel Bar"	Whitters; Lori McKenna	4:35
8.	"Happy People"	Whitters; McKenna	3:03
9.	"The Devil Always Made Me Think Twice"	Al Anderson; Chris Stapleton	4:11
10.	"All the Cool Girls"	Whitters; Dillon; Brett Tyler	3:37
11.	"The Faker"	Whitters; Lindsey; Waylon Payne	3:49
12.	"Living the Dream"	Whitters; McKenna	3:24
Total length:			43:29

The Dream: Living the Dream deluxe tracks
No.	Title	Writer(s)	Length
13.	"Fillin' My Cup" (featuring Little Big Town)	Whitters; Galyon; Lindsey	3:11
14.	"Glad to Be Here" (featuring Brent Cobb)	Cobb; Neil Medley; Brent Rupard	4:33
15.	"How to Break a Heart" (featuring Hillary Lindsey and Lori McKenna)	Whitters; Lindsey; McKenna	3:24
16.	"How Far Can It Go?" (featuring Trisha Yearwood)	Whitters; Galyon; Lindsey	2:55
17.	"The Ride" (featuring Jordan Davis)	Whitters; Lindsey; West	3:27
Total length:			1:00:01
