= Massachusetts (Lori McKenna album) =

Studio album by Lori McKenna
- Released: 23 April 2013
- Genre: Folk music
- Label: Signature Sounds

Lori McKenna chronology
Lorraine (2011)	Massachusetts (2013)	Numbered Doors (2014)

Massachusetts is the seventh studio album from folk music singer Lori McKenna. The album reached No. 18 on the Billboard Folk Albums chart.

== Track listing ==
1. Salt
2. My Love Follows You Where You Go
3. Susanna
4. Smaller and Smaller
5. Make Every Word Hurt
6. Shake
7. How Romantic is That
8. Shouting
9. Better With Time
10. Take Me With You When You Go
11. Love Can Put It Back Together
12. Grown Up Now

With “Grown Up Now” being about the life of McKenna’s first child (Brian) who is also a songwriter.

== Charts ==
Chart (2013)	Peak position
US Top Heatseekers	11
US Folk Albums	18
