= Lorraine (album) =

Studio album by Lori McKenna
- Released: 25 January 2011
- Genre: Folk music
- Label: Signature Sounds

Lori McKenna chronology
Unglamorous (2007)	Lorraine (2011)	Massachusetts (2013)

Lorraine is the sixth album from American folk music singer Lori McKenna. Released January 25, 2011, on Signature Sounds, the album reached No. 6 on the Billboard Folk Albums chart.

The title of the album refers to McKenna’s mother Lorraine who died when McKenna was six years old.

== Reception ==
Professional ratings
Aggregate scores
Source	Rating
Metacritic	73/100
Review scores
Source	Rating
AllMusic	4/5 stars
Slant Magazine	3/5 stars
The Daily Telegraph	3/5 stars

Lorraine received positive reviews from critics. On Metacritic, the album holds a score of 73/100 based on 6 reviews, indicating "generally favorable reviews". Writing in The Boston Globe, Sarah Rodman declared the album was "a stunner - even by McKenna’s reliably high standards. It is filled with the intimately detailed songs she writes about motherhood, home, family, love, and loss that have made her an in-demand writer in Nashville ever since Faith Hill and Tim McGraw brought her into its spotlight."

== Track listing ==
Songs by Lori McKenna, except where noted.

1. "The Luxury of Knowing" - 3:50
2. "The Most" (Lori McKenna, Barry Dean) - 3:06
3. "If He Tried" - 3:25
4. "Lorraine" - 4:13
5. "You Get a Love Song" - 3:50
6. "Rocket Science" (McKenna, Dean, Tom Douglas) - 4:19
7. "Buy This Town" - 4:02
8. "All I Ever Do" (McKenna, Natalie Hemby) - 4:28
9. "That's How You Know" (McKenna, Andrew Dorff) - 3:54
10. "Sweet Disposition" - 3:57
11. "American Revolver" (McKenna, Dean) - 4:05
12. "Ladders and Parachutes" (McKenna, Dorff) - 4:05
13. "Still Down Here" (McKenna, Dean) - 4:03

== Personnel ==
- Chris Carmichael - strings
- Kim Carnes – background vocals
- John Catchings – cello
- Perry Coleman – background vocals
- J.T. Corenflos – electric guitar
- Eric Darken – drums, percussion
- Barry Dean – keyboards, background vocals
- Will Denton – drums, percussion
- Mike Durham – electric guitar
- Vicki Hampton – background vocals
- Jaime Hanna – background vocals
- Sean McConnell – background vocals
- Pat McGrath – acoustic guitar
- Lori McKenna – acoustic guitar, lead vocals, background vocals
- Pat McLaughlin – mandolin
- Jeff Roach – drums, keyboards, percussion
- Jonathan Singleton – background vocals
- Jimmie Lee Sloas – bass guitar
- Walt Wilkins – background vocals
- Craig Young – bass guitar

== Charts ==
Chart (2011)	Peak position
US Folk Albums	6
US Top Heatseekers	5
US Independent Albums	30
