= Unglamorous =

Studio album by Lori McKenna
- Released: August 14, 2007
- Studio: Ocean Way, Nashville
- Genre: Country, folk music
- Length: 46:54
- Label: Warner Bros., StyleSonic Records
- Producer: Tim McGraw & Byron Gallimore

Lori McKenna chronology
Bittertown (2004)	Unglamorous (2007)	Lorraine (2011)

Unglamorous is the first major label album from country/folk singer Lori McKenna. After three songs written by McKenna appeared on Faith Hill's 2005 album, Fireflies, Warner Bros. Records re-released McKenna's 2004 album Bittertown (her fourth independent release). Unglamorous, however, is the first album of McKenna's recorded specifically for a major label. The album was released August 14, 2007, on StyleSonic Records through Warner Bros. Records.

Hill's husband, Tim McGraw co-produces the album and each of them contributes vocals to one of the tracks. Other notable guest appearances are made by Kelly Willis, Darrell Scott, Bryan Sutton and Buddy Miller.

== Songs ==
All of the songs were written or co-written by McKenna. She describes her songs as a collision of autobiography, observation and a vivid imagination. As a 38-year-old mother of five and married 19 years to the same man, McKenna has a lot of life experience to draw upon.

"I only can write about what I know or conversations I've had with people who have the same type of life that I do," McKenna says in Billboard, "I live in the same town I grew up in. I only have a sixth grade vocabulary, and I only know three chords. This is who I am, and I don't really have time to take a piano class or anything."

The opening cut, "I Know You", makes a reference to poet, D. H. Lawrence.

The first single release from the album was the title track, "Unglamorous".

== Reception ==
Professional ratings
Review scores
Source	Rating
AllMusic	3/5 stars
Rolling Stone	3/5 stars

Unglamorous was widely reviewed with a generally favorable reception. An analysis of reviews by Metacritic assigned the album a score of 80 out of 100 placing the album just below the top rated albums of 2007. Writing for Billboard, critic Ken Tucker suggests the album may be "one of [2007's] best country albums."

A number of reviews expressed concern that the more slick Nashville production was not the best setting for McKenna's songs, and Rolling Stone describes the sound at times as falling into "unglamorous midtempo muck." Other writers felt that the production, while evidently high-end, still served the musical direction of the album. According to The Boston Globe, "The subtle twang that crept into the smart folk and finely wrought Americana on McKenna's four previous albums has been shined up and sharpened, but the endeavor still feels natural."

== Tour ==
McKenna toured as an opening act for Faith Hill and Tim McGraw on the first five weeks of their Soul2Soul 2007 Tour in June and July 2007 to help promote the album. This 18 show run in the United States and Canada introduced McKenna's music to 260,000 Hill and McGraw fans.

McKenna also appeared with Hill on Oprah. She performed on ABC's Good Morning America on the day the album was released and was also featured on Nightline. People and Oprah Winfrey's O: The Oprah Magazine also featured pieces covering McKenna.

McKenna tours with the support of a Boston band (musicians that do not appear on this recording) that includes Mark Erelli, Paul Kochanski, Russell Chudnofsky, and John Sands. She has since toured as an opener for country singer Trisha Yearwood.

== Track listing ==
No.	Title	Writer(s)	Length
1.	"I Know You"	McKenna	3:57
2.	"Unglamorous"	McKenna, Liz Rose	4:12
3.	"Your Next Lover"	McKenna	4:28
4.	"I'm Not Crazy"	McKenna	4:18
5.	"Falter"	McKenna	4:49
6.	"Witness to Your Life"	McKenna	3:31
7.	"Drinkin' Problem"	McKenna, Mark D. Sanders	4:00
8.	"How to Survive"	McKenna, Rose	4:37
9.	"Written Permission"	McKenna	4:08
10.	"Confetti"	McKenna	4:01
11.	"Leaving This Life"	McKenna, Sanders	4:53
Total length:			46:54

== Credits ==
=== Musicians ===
- Lori McKenna – vocals and acoustic guitar
- Tom Bukovac – acoustic & electric guitars
- Dan Dugmore – Dobro, steel guitar
- Stuart Duncan – fiddle, mandolin
- Shannon Forrest – drums
- Byron Gallimore – synthesizer & electric guitar
- Tony Harrell – organ, synthesizer, piano, harmonium, Wurlitzer
- Darrell Scott – acoustic guitar, mandolin
- Bryan Sutton – acoustic guitar, mandolin
- Glenn Worf – bass
- String arrangements on "Your Next Lover", "Falter" & "Leaving This Life" by Kristin Wilkinson
  - Kristin Wilkinson – viola
  - David Angell – violin
  - David Davidson – Violin
  - John Catchings – cello
- Background vocals:
  - Greg Barnhill – "I Know You", "Unglamorous", "Your Next Lover", "Written Permission" & "Confetti"
  - Bekka Bramlett – "Unglamorous"
  - Byron Gallimore – "Written Permission"
  - Faith Hill – "Falter"
  - Tim McGraw – "Drinkin' Problem"
  - Buddy Miller – "How to Survive"
  - Kelly Willis – "I'm Not Crazy" & "Leaving this Life"

=== Production ===
- Produced by Tim McGraw & Byron Gallimore
- Recorded by Julian King at Ocean Way, Nashville, Tennessee
- Assistant engineers – David Bryant, PJ French, and Todd Shall
- Additional editing and Pro Tools – Erik Lutkins, Sara Lesher & Jesse Chrisman at Essential Sound, Nashville
- Kelly Willis' background vocals:
  - Recorded at Premium Recording
  - Engineer Kevin Symanski
- "Confetti" and "I Know You"
  - Mixed by Julian King at Ocean Way, Nashville
  - Mix assistants – Leslie Richter, David Bryant
- "I'm Not Crazy" and "Drinkin' Problem"
  - Mixed by Erik Lutkins at Essential sound, Nashville
  - Mix assistant – Sara Lesher
- "Leaving This Life", "Unglamorous", "Your Next Lover", "Falter", "Witness to Your Life", "How to Survive", and "Written Permission"
  - Mixed by Byron Gallimore at Essential Sound, Nashville
  - Mix assistants – Erik Lutkins, sara Lesher and Jesse Chrisman
- Mastered by Adam Ayan at Gateway Mastering

=== Artwork ===
- Art direction & design – Stephen Walker
- Art production – Aaron Horwitz
- Photography – Andrew Southam, Michael "Mick" Wilson & Nancy Giroux

=== Management ===
Management – Brian Avnet, Amos Newman, & Michael Gorffaine

== Chart performance ==
Chart (2007)	Peak position
US Billboard 200	109
US Top Current Album Sales (Billboard)	109
US Top Country Albums (Billboard)	19
US Heatseekers Albums (Billboard)	1
