= Carter Faith =

American country musician

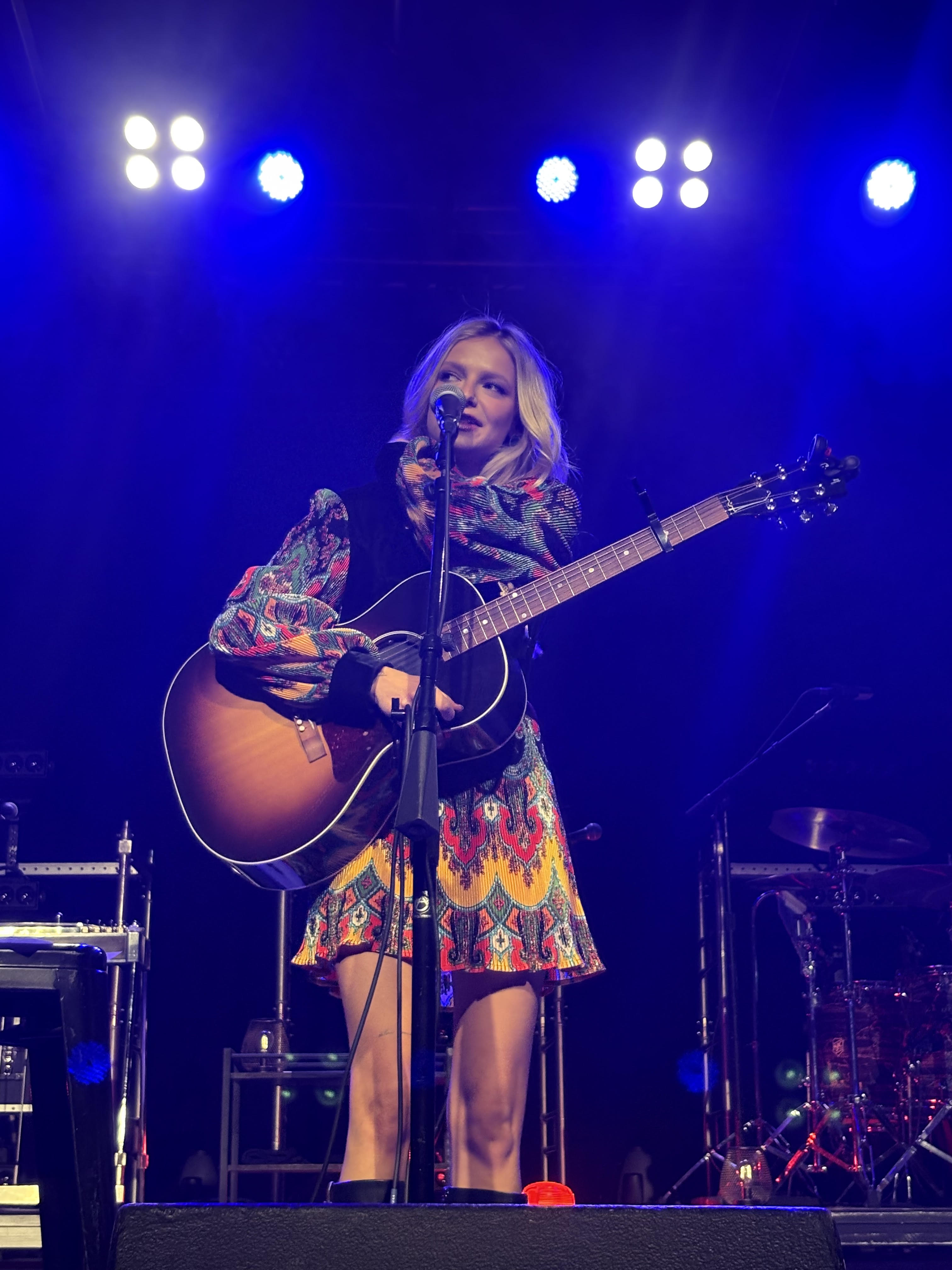

Background information
- Born: Carter Faith Jones; June 14, 2000 (age 26)
- Genre: Country
- Occupation: Singer-songwriter
- Instruments: Vocals; Piano; Guitar
- Years active: 2018–present
- Label: MCA Nashville
- Website: www.carterfaith.com

TikTok information
- Page: carterfaith
- Followers: 40 thousand
- Last updated: September 23, 2023

Carter Faith Jones (born June 14, 2000), known professionally as Carter Faith, is an American country music singer, songwriter and actress. Her debut album, Cherry Valley, was released on October 3, 2025.

== Biography ==
Faith is a native of Davidson, North Carolina. She has an older sister and a younger brother, Griffin Jones, who is also a musical artist; he uses the stage name Grifdorf. Her father is a lawyer who represented Peter Angelos, former majority owner of the Baltimore Orioles.

Although she grew up in a non-musical family, at a young age, she was inspired by her grandfather's country music cassette tapes. She taught herself piano and guitar and at age 16, she began writing lyrics, inspired by the end of a relationship. She attended Grammy Camp in Nashville where she performed at the Bluebird Café and was a featured performer in the 2016 Thanksgiving Day Parade in Charlotte. In June 2018, she graduated from Cannon School. In the fall of 2018, she enrolled in a songwriting program at Belmont University. In September 2018, she sang The Star-Spangled Banner at Oriole Park at Camden Yards. In 2019, she signed with Pound It Out Loud Entertainment. Faith's first song titled "Leaving Tennessee" debuted in July 2020, and was followed by "Sinners in a Small Town" and "Easy Pill" later that year. In October 2020, she signed an artist development deal with Altadena, a record company founded by busbee. "The Dusk Session", which included acoustic versions of "Easy Pill" and "Leaving Tennessee", was released in April 2021. In July 2021, she made her first performance at the Ryman Auditorium. On August 20, 2021, she released her debut EP Let Love Be Love. In September 2021, she was the opening act for The Avett Brothers at Oriole Park at Camden Yards. She graduated from Belmont University in December 2021.

In March 2022, she signed a publishing deal with Universal Music Group Nashville. Also in March 2022, she was named Country Rookie of the Month by Billboard. In June 2022, she made her debut at the Grand Ole Opry. In November 2022, she released the single "Already Crazy", which she co-wrote with Tofer Brown and Lauren Hungate.

Faith's debut album, Cherry Valley, was released via MCA Nashville on October 3, 2025. It received acclaim from critics, and was nominated for the Academy of Country Music Award for Album of the Year at the 61st Academy of Country Music Awards, making Faith the first artist in over ten years to be nominated for the award with their debut album (following Chris Stapleton's Traveller in 2015).

In September 2025, it was announced that Faith had been cast in the upcoming Netflix thriller film Heartland alongside Jessica Chastain and John Hawkes.

== Influences ==
Faith cites Tammy Wynette, Patsy Cline, Dusty Springfield, Lana Del Rey, Kacey Musgraves, Taylor Swift, Gram Parsons, Eric Church, Dolly Parton, and Fleetwood Mac as influences on her sound and songwriting.

== Personal life ==
Faith is based in Nashville and is a part of the Song Suffragettes.

== Discography ==
=== Studio albums ===
List of albums, showing relevant details
Title	Album details
Cherry Valley	Release date: October 3, 2025; Label: MCA Nashville; Format: LP, CD, streaming

=== Extended plays ===
List of EPs, showing relevant details
Title	EP details
Let Love Be Love	Release date: August 20, 2021; Label: Altadena/Pound It Out Loud; Format: streaming
Man	Release date: October 27, 2023; Label: Suburban Heartbreak; Format: streaming
The Aftermath	Release date: October 11, 2024; Label: Capitol Records Nashville; Format: streaming

=== Charting singles ===
Title	Year	Peak chart positions					Album
Title	Year	US Country	US Country Airplay	CAN Country	UK Country	SWE Heat.	Album
"Betty"	2025	—	—	18	6	—	Cherry Valley
"That's When You Know" (with Kygo)	2026	—	—	—	—	7	TBA
"Nothin' Better to Do" (with Wyatt Flores)	2026	49	47	—	—	—	Cherry Valley Forever

== Tours ==
=== Opening act ===
- Ingrid Andress (2023)
- Ella Langley – Still Hungover (2025)
- Post Malone — Big Ass Stadium Tour 2 (2026)

== Awards and nominations ==
Year	Association	Category	Nominated work	Result	Ref.
2026	Academy of Country Music Awards	Album of the Year	Cherry Valley	Nominated	
2026	Country Music Association Awards	New Artist of the Year	Herself	Nominated	
2027	Grammy Awards	Best Contemporary Country Album	Cherry Valley	Pending	
