= Corn Queen =

Studio album by Hailey Whitters
- Released: June 6, 2025
- Genre: Country
- Label: Big Loud; Pigasus
- Producer: Jake Gear

Hailey Whitters chronology
I'm in Love (2023)	Corn Queen (2025)

Corn Queen is the fourth studio album by American country artist Hailey Whitters. It was released on June 6, 2025, via a partnership between Big Loud and her own imprint, Pigasus.

== Background ==
Whitters wrote or co-wrote all but two of the 16 songs on Corn Queen, and Whitters' husband and longtime collaborator, Jake Gear, produced the album. The album's title is inspired by a nickname Whitters received from her fans, which derives from her upbringing in Iowa. Reflecting on the duality of the title, Whitters said: "Corn is this simple, humble crop, and 'queen' implies royalty passed down through blood. I come from a long line of blue-collar farmers and construction workers. I've been out here for over a decade brushing my teeth in truck stop bathrooms, sleeping on hotel floors, driving myself from gig to gig. It's not glamorous, but I'm proud of it. I like the idea of a queen with little grit and elbow grease." Its cover artwork features a bust of Whitters made out of butter.

Corn Queen was announced on April 4, 2025, and preceded by the release of four promotional singles — "Casseroles", "Prodigal Daughter", "High on the Hog", and "High on a Heartbreak". It features collaborations with Molly Tuttle, Charles Wesley Godwin, and The Wilder Blue.

== Track listing ==
Corn Queen track listing
No.	Title	Writer(s)	Length
1.	"High on the Hog"	Hailey Whitters	3:44
2.	"Prodigal Daughter" (featuring Molly Tuttle)	Whitters; Paul Sikes; Bryan Simpson	3:26
3.	"Shotgun Wedding Baby"	Whitters; Brad Warren; Brett Warren; Caroline Watkins	3:00
4.	"Helluva Heart"	Whitters; Trannie Anderson; Sikes	3:19
5.	"High on a Heartbreak"	Whitters; Jessie Jo Dillon; David Garcia; Hillary Lindsey	3:44
6.	"It'll Do"	Whitters; Chris LaCorte; Lindsey; Jon Nite	4:00
7.	"Hearsay"	Whitters; Anderson; Sikes	3:09
8.	"Anything Like Me"	Whitters; Anderson; Sikes	3:30
9.	"I Don't Want You" (featuring Charles Wesley Godwin)	Whitters; Nite; Gordie Sampson	3:19
10.	"The Nail"	Whitters; Simpson; Ryan Tyndell	3:52
11.	"Casseroles"	Tom Douglas; Lindsey; James Slater	3:40
12.	"Wagon"	Anderson; Ben Hayslip; Seth Mosley	3:34
13.	"Wholesome"	Whitters; Luke Dick	0:20
14.	"White Limousine"	Whitters; Dillon; Jesse Frasure	4:12
15.	"Corn Queen"	Whitters; Bobby Pinson	3:20
16.	"DanceMor" (featuring The Wilder Blue)	Whitters; Nicolle Galyon; Shane McAnally; Josh Osborne	3:31
