= When Someone Stops Loving You =

Single by Little Big Town

from the album The Breaker
- Released: June 26, 2017
- Genre: Country
- Length: 3:49
- Label: Capitol Nashville
- Songwriter(s): Hillary Lindsey; Chase McGill; Lori McKenna
- Producer(s): Jay Joyce

Little Big Town singles chronology
"Happy People" (2017)	"When Someone Stops Loving You" (2017)	"Summer Fever" (2018)

"When Someone Stops Loving You" is a song written by Hillary Lindsey, Chase McGill and Lori McKenna, and recorded by American country music group Little Big Town from their eighth studio album The Breaker. The song was released to country radio as the album's third single on June 26, 2017.

== Content ==
The song is about the shattering pain resulting from a love gone wrong. However, instead of focusing on the heartbreak, the song talks about how the world is still spinning while you are struggling to get through the day. Despite the fact that everything seems to stop for the person experiencing the end of a relationship, everyone else is carrying on just like nothing has changed.

== Charts ==
Chart (2017)	Peak position
US Country Airplay (Billboard)	37
US Hot Country Songs (Billboard)	36
