= Numbered Doors =

Studio album by Lori McKenna
- Released: September 23, 2014
- Recorded: March 2014
- Genre: Country, folk
- Length: 37:11
- Label: Hoodie Songs

Lori McKenna chronology
Massachusetts (2013)	Numbered Doors (2014)	The Bird and the Rifle (2016)

Professional ratings
Review scores
Source	Rating
Robert Christgau	(2-star Honorable Mention)
Country Standard Time	(favorable)
No Depression	(favorable)
The Telegraph	5/5 stars

Numbered Doors is the eighth studio album by the folk singer Lori McKenna, released on September 23, 2014. Rolling Stone named it the 16th best country album of 2014.

== Track listing ==
No.	Title	Writer(s)	Length
1.	"The Time I've Wasted"	Lori McKenna, Jesse Walker, Liz Rose	3:33
2.	"Numbered Doors"	McKenna	3:44
3.	"Stranger in His Kiss"	McKenna, Dean Fields	4:34
4.	"God Never Made One of Us to Be Alone"	McKenna	4:30
5.	"All a Woman Wants"	McKenna	3:17
6.	"Rose of Jericho"	McKenna, Drew Kennedy	3:39
7.	"Love to Be Cruel for" (featuring Mark Erelli)	McKenna, Ben Fields	3:34
8.	"Good Marriage"	McKenna	3:37
9.	"Three Kids No Husband"	McKenna, Brandy Clark	3:19
10.	"Starlight"	McKenna, Hillary Lindsey, Liz Rose	3:24
Total length:			37:11
