= Better Man (Little Big Town song) =

2016 single by Little Big Town

Single by Little Big Town

from the album The Breaker
- Released: October 20, 2016
- Genre: Country
- Length: 4:21
- Label: Capitol Nashville
- Songwriter: Taylor Swift
- Producer: Jay Joyce

Little Big Town singles chronology
"One of Those Days" (2016)	"Better Man" (2016)	"Happy People" (2017)

Music video
- "Better Man" on YouTube

"Better Man" is a song by the American country music group Little Big Town. It was released on October 20, 2016, as the lead single from the group's eighth studio album, The Breaker (2017). The song was written by Taylor Swift, who initially intended to include it on her fourth studio album, Red (2012), but it did not make the final track listing. In 2016, Swift pitched the song to Little Big Town, believing the group's vocal harmonies suited it. Produced by Jay Joyce, "Better Man" is a country ballad about wishing that an ex-lover had been a more deserving partner.

Little Big Town first performed the song live at the 50th Annual Country Music Association Awards on November 2, 2016, and later included it in the set lists of their 2018 and 2024 tours. In the United States, the single peaked at number 34 on the Billboard Hot 100 and reached number one on both the Hot Country Songs and Country Airplay charts. It won Song of the Year at the 51st Annual Country Music Association Awards in 2017 and received the award for Best Country Duo/Group Performance, as well as a nomination for Best Country Song (for Swift), at the 60th Annual Grammy Awards in 2018.

Swift performed her own version of "Better Man" at several concerts in 2017 and 2018. Following a 2019 dispute over the ownership of her back catalog, she recorded a solo rendition titled "Better Man (Taylor's Version) (From the Vault)" for her 2021 re-recorded album, Red (Taylor's Version). The track was produced by Swift and Aaron Dessner and peaked at number 46 on the Billboard Global 200.

== Background and release ==
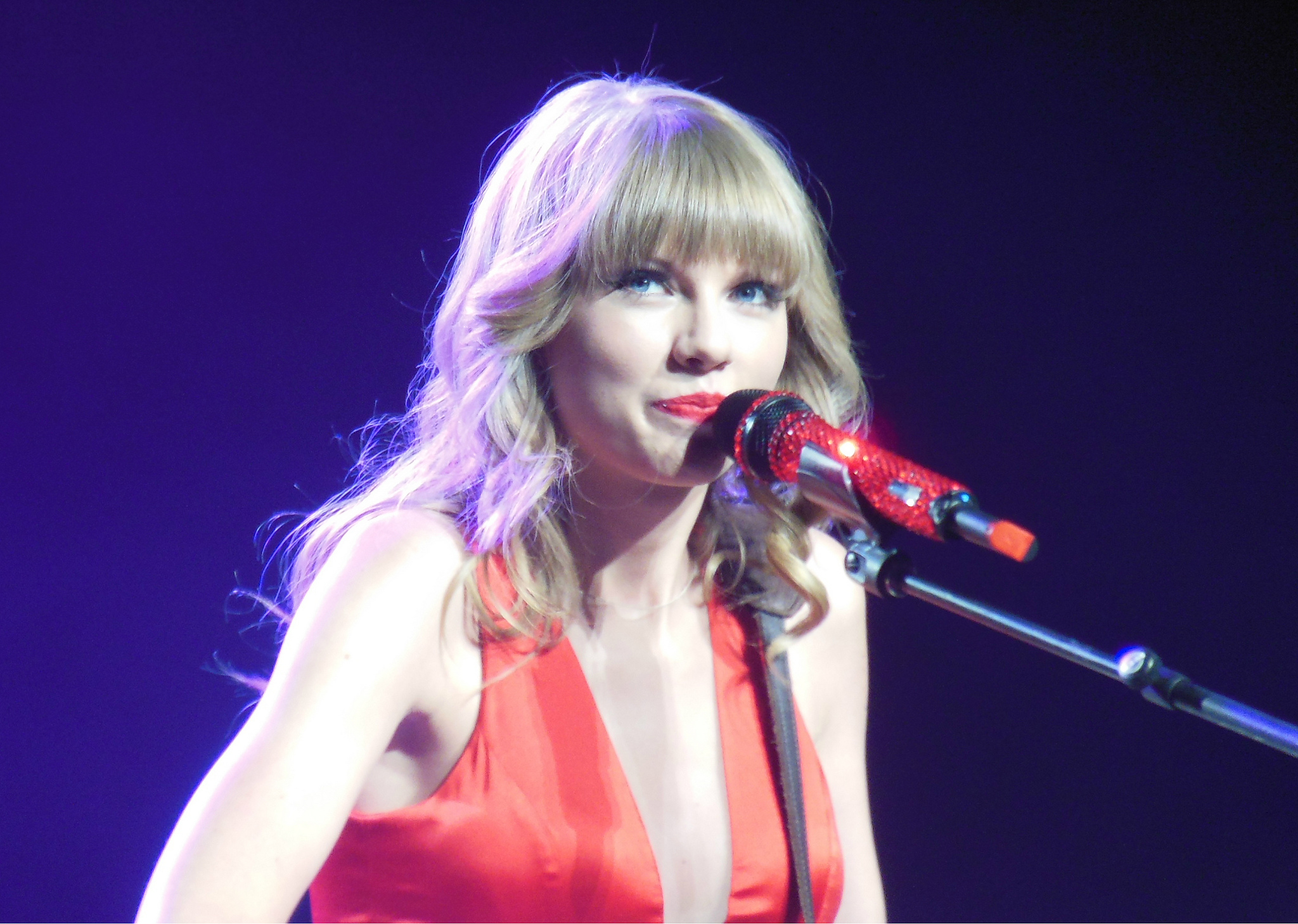
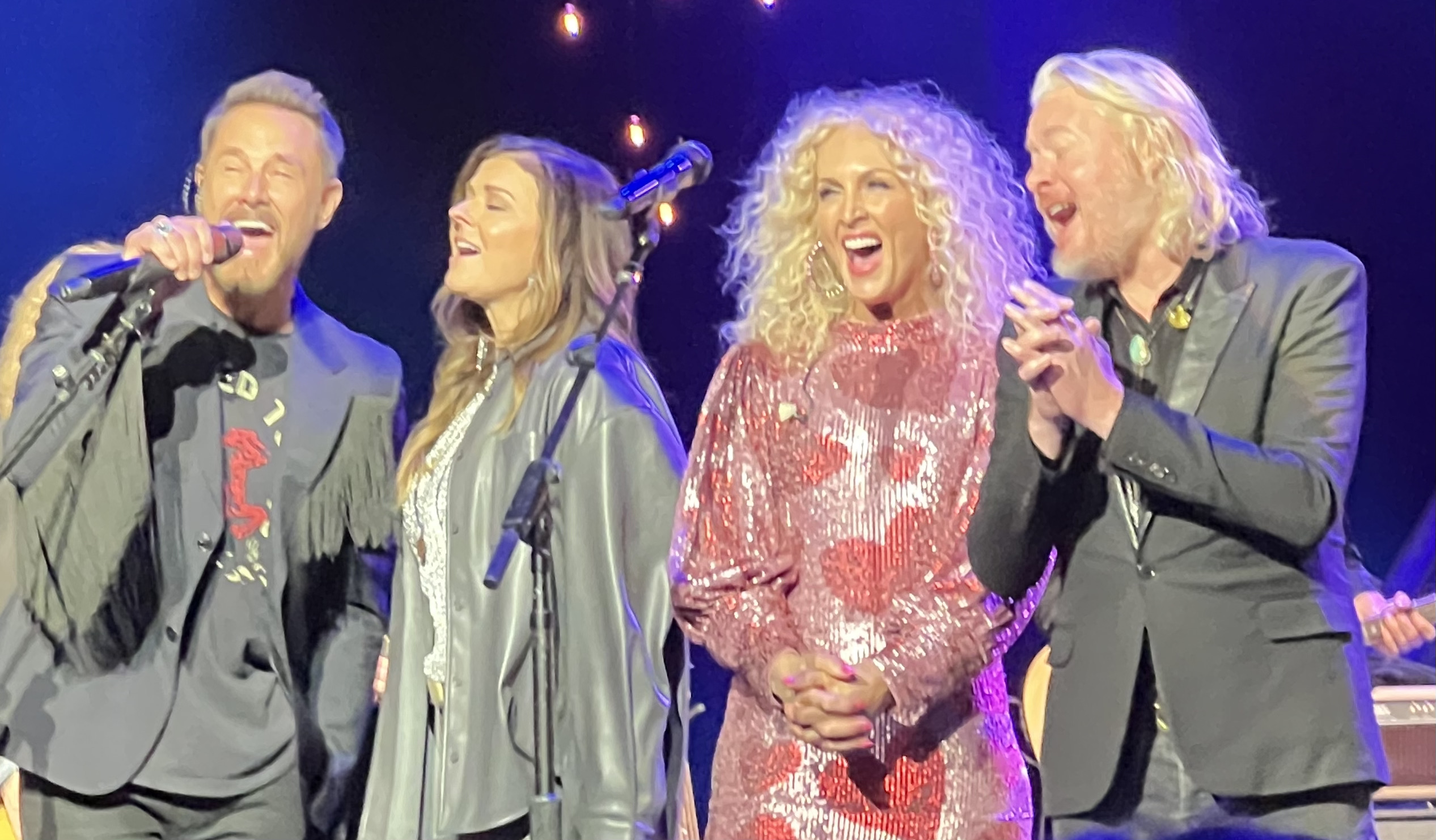
Taylor Swift (left) wrote "Better Man" for her 2012 album Red but ultimately left it out. She offered the track to Little Big Town (right) in 2016 because of the group's vocal harmonies.

Taylor Swift wrote "Better Man" intending to include it in her fourth studio album, Red (2012). She left it out of the final track listing because she wrote "too many songs [she] loved" during that time period, having to exclude some tracks out. According to her, she decided to include "All Too Well" in place of "Better Man".

Swift's original demo of "Better Man", recorded in 2012 for Red, leaked on October 12, 2021. One month before the release of Red (Taylor's Version). Though it didn't make the cut for Red when it was originally released, she always hoped that the song would materialize. One day, she thought of the country music group Little Big Town, and she believed their vocal harmonies suited the song; she and the group had been friends since her high-school days in Nashville, Tennessee. Swift sent an email to Little Big Town's Phillip Sweet informing him of the song, and he played it to the other members, who were fond of the lyrics, finding them powerful.

The group originally kept Swift's identity anonymous when telling their label of the song, saying that it was offered to them by a "young girl from Nashville". It was only two weeks after "Better Man" was released that both the group and Swift confirmed that she was the songwriter. It was the first time Swift had pitched a song of hers to another artist, and Little Big Town initially kept her identity anonymous for fears that it would influence their fans' perceptions of the track, and because Swift wanted "Better Man" to stand on its own merits as an artistic work. "Better Man" was released for streaming and download on October 20, 2016, via Capitol Nashville, as the lead single from the group's album The Breaker (2017).

== Composition ==
Produced by Jay Joyce, "Better Man" a country ballad that is 4 minutes and 21 seconds long. Its pop-oriented, acoustic guitar-driven arrangement incorporates a drum loop, pinging guitar effects, and occasional keyboard tones. The song is in a slow tempo of 72 beats per minute, written with a 4/4 time signature. It is in the key of F major, with a chord pattern of F-C-B♭-B♭_{2}-B♭. Karen Fairchild's lead vocal spans from F_{3} to B♭_{4}. For Swift's recording, she takes the pitch down to the originally planned key of E major, with the E–B–A–A^{2}–A chord progression and vocals from E_{3} to A_{4}, and is 36 seconds longer by an extended final chorus.

The lyrics are about a painful breakup that leaves the narrator ruminating on an ex-partner, assuming that their broken relationship would have turned out great if the ex-partner were not a terrible man. Although the narrator admits that the relationship had its good moments, she expresses her emotional scars ("I just wish I could forget when it was magic") and resorts to escaping the relationship due to the ex-partner's abusive nature. According to Little Big Town, the track could resonate with many people who had to face tough decisions about moving on from difficult situations, "no matter how hard that is, you just know down in your heart that it's time to do that."

== Music video and live performances ==
An accompanying music video was directed by Becky Fluke and Reid Long and premiered on November 1, 2016. Set in a rural household, the video depicts three generations of single parents whose partners ultimately leave them. The cycle is presumably broken at the end, when Philip Sweet's character has a baby girl and makes an effort to be a better role model.

Little Big Town performed "Better Man" live for the first time at the 50th Annual Country Music Association Awards on November 2, 2016. In 2018, they sang the track again at the 60th Annual Grammy Awards on January 27 and at the Grammys on the Hill on April 18. The group included it in two of their tours' set lists: Breakers Tour in 2018 and Take Me Home Tour in 2024.

== Critical reception ==
Kevin John Coyne of Country Universe rated the song "A", saying that "it's a concept that is grounded in so much truth that I'm amazed I've never heard it approached this way before" and "the writers do a great job of capturing both why [the song's narrator] stayed so long and why she had to leave, and all of the conflicting feelings that go along with that." Taste of Country writer Billy Dukes also praised the song, saying that "This song isn't as jarring as some of the quartet's most recent hits. In fact, the mistreatment of women is only vaguely alluded to — there's no one line that burns the hair off the back of your neck. Jay Joyce's arrangement is soft but not stark. It's among his more mainstream productions. Still, it's clear Fairchild's protagonist is reeling from a love that went very, very wrong." Taste of Country ranked it the 42nd best country song of the 2010s.

The song sold 6,000 copies on its first day of release, entering the Billboard Hot Country Songs chart at number 41. It sold 20,000 the following week, rising to number 20 in the chart. In its third week it sold a further 47,000 copies and climbed to number six. On the Hot Country Songs chart dated February 11, 2017, "Better Man" reached number one, earning the group their third number-one. It spent two weeks at the top before being dethroned by Sam Hunt's "Body Like A Back Road". The song was certified platinum in the United States by the RIAA on August 23, 2017. The song has sold 772,000 copies in the United States as of February 2018.

=== Accolades ===
Year	Association	Category	Result
2017	Billboard Music Awards	Top Country Song	Nominated
2017	CMT Music Awards	Group Video of the Year	Won
2017	CMT Music Awards	Video of the Year	Nominated
2017	CMA Awards	Single of the Year	Nominated
2017	CMA Awards	Song of the Year	Won
2017	CMA Awards	Music Video of the Year	Nominated
2018	Grammy Awards	Best Country Duo/Group Performance	Won
2018	Grammy Awards	Best Country Song	Nominated
2018	ACM Awards	Single Record of the Year	Nominated

== Credits and personnel ==
Credits adapted from Tidal

- Little Big Town – vocals
- Taylor Swift – songwriter
- Jay Joyce – producer, programmer, bass, drums, guitar, keyboards, percussion, mixer
- Jaxon Hargrove – assistant recording engineer
- Jimmy Mansfield – assistant recording engineer
- Jason Hall – engineer
- Richard Dodd – mastering engineer

== Charts ==
=== Weekly charts ===
Weekly chart performance
Chart (2016–2017)	Peak position
Canada Hot 100 (Billboard)	56
Canada Country (Billboard)	1
US Billboard Hot 100	34
US Country Airplay (Billboard)	1
US Hot Country Songs (Billboard)	1

=== Year-end charts ===
Year-end chart performance
Chart (2017)	Position
Canada Country (Billboard)	8
US Country Airplay (Billboard)	34
US Hot Country Songs (Billboard)	10

=== Decade-end charts ===
Decade-end chart performance
Chart (2010–2019)	Position
US Hot Country Songs (Billboard)	29

== Certifications ==
Certifications for "Better Man"
Region	Certification	Certified units/sales
Canada (Music Canada)	Gold	40,000^{‡}
United States (RIAA)	3× Platinum	3,000,000^{‡}
^{‡} Sales+streaming figures based on certification alone.

== Other versions ==
Swift performed "Better Man" at Club Nomadic in Houston as part of the DirecTV special, Super Saturday Night on February 4, 2017. She also performed it on March 31, 2018, at the Bluebird Café in Nashville, Tennessee, and on August 25, 2018, at her Reputation Stadium Tour stop at Nissan Stadium in Nashville. Swift performed "Better Man" as a surprise song on May 19, 2023, at the first Eras Tour show in Foxborough, Massachusetts. It was also a surprise song on July 19, 2024, on the last of three nights in Gelsenkirchen, Germany as part of a mashup with her 2020 song "It's Time to Go".

On February 15, 2017, Chase Bryant recorded a cover version of the song, changing the song's narrative from second person to first. Bryant's rendition was described favorably by both Billboard and Rolling Stone for the change in the song's perspective, as well as the harmonies provided by Runaway June.

== "Better Man (Taylor's Version)" ==
"Better Man (Taylor's Version) (From the Vault)"

Song by Taylor Swift

from the album Red (Taylor's Version)
- Released: November 12, 2021
- Studio: Long Pond (New York)
- Genre: Country pop
- Length: 4:57
- Label: Republic
- Songwriter: Taylor Swift
- Producers: Taylor Swift; Aaron Dessner

Lyric video
- "Better Man (Taylor's Version)" on YouTube

Swift recorded "Better Man", subtitled "(Taylor's Version) (From the Vault)", for her second re-recorded album, Red (Taylor's Version), released on November 12, 2021, through Republic Records. The re-recorded "Better Man" was produced by Swift and Aaron Dessner. A country pop ballad, it is driven by a six-string acoustic guitar and mandolin, and features lap steel guitar and a string section played by the London Contemporary Orchestra, conducted by Robert Ames and arranged by Bryce Dessner.

=== Personnel ===
Credits adapted from the liner notes of Red (Taylor's Version)

Technical

- Taylor Swift – writer, producer
- Aaron Dessner – recording, producer, engineering, drum machine programming
- Derek Garten – background vocals recording
- Jonathan Low – recording, engineering
- Jeremy Murphy – strings recording
- Christopher Rowe – lead vocals recording
- Robert Ames – conducting
- Bryce Dessner – orchestrator
- Galya Bisengalieva – London Contemporary Orchestra (LCO) leader
- Amy Hinds – LCO manager
- Meg Monteith – LCO recording projects manager
- Talia Morey – copyist

Musicians

- Taylor Swift – lead vocals
- Aaron Dessner – acoustic guitar, bass guitar, keyboards, piano, synthesizer
- Josh Kaufman – acoustic guitar, electric guitar, lap steel guitar, mandolin
- Jonny Byers – cello
- Oliver Coates – cello
- Max Ruisi – cello
- Dave Brown – double bass
- James Krivchenia – drums, percussion
- Stephanie Edmundson – viola
- Clifton Harrison – viola
- Matthew Kettle – viola
- Zoe Matthews – viola
- Zara Benyounes – first violin
- Galya Bisengalieva – first violin
- Antonia Kesel – first violin
- Natalie Klouda – first violin
- Anna Ovsyanikova – first violin
- Charlotte Reid – first violin
- Anna de Bruin – second violin
- Guy Button – second violin
- Charis Jenson – second violin
- Nicole Crespo O'Donoghue
- Nicole Stokes – second violin
- Eloisa‐Fleur Thom – second violin
- Caitlin Evanson – background vocals
- Liz Huett – background vocals

=== Charts ===
Chart performance for "Better Man (Taylor's Version)"
Chart (2021)	Peak position
Canada Hot 100 (Billboard)	36
Global 200 (Billboard)	46
UK Audio Streaming (Official Charts)	98
US Billboard Hot 100	51
US Hot Country Songs (Billboard)	13

=== Certification ===
Certification for "Better Man (Taylor's Version)"
Region	Certification	Certified units/sales
Australia (ARIA)	Gold	35,000^{‡}
^{‡} Sales+streaming figures based on certification alone.
