= Everything She Ain't =

Single by Hailey Whitters

from the album Raised
- Released: June 1, 2022
- Genre: Country
- Length: 2:32
- Label: Big Loud
- Songwriters: Hailey Whitters; Ryan Tyndell; Bryan Simpson
- Producer: Jake Gear

Hailey Whitters singles chronology
"Everything She Ain't" (2022)	"I'm in Love" (2023)

"Everything She Ain't" is a song by American country music artist Hailey Whitters. It was released on June 1, 2022 as her debut single and the lead single from her third studio album Raised.

== Content and history ==
Whitters wrote the song with Ryan Tyndell and Bryan Simpson. The three wrote the song in March 2021. Originally, they were working on a different song when Whitters came up with the lyric "I'm everything she is and everything she ain't". The other two began adding lines and developed the song into "a putdown of the male character's current girlfriend". The recording features Tyndell singing harmony vocals. Producer Jake Gear, who is Whitters's husband, added steel guitar, fiddle, and banjo, as well as a güiro. The song was sent to country radio in June 2022 as the lead single to Whitters's third studio album Raised.

== Chart performance ==
=== Weekly charts ===
Weekly chart performance for "Everything She Ain't"
Chart (2022–2023)	Peak position
Canada (Canadian Hot 100)	73
Canada Country (Billboard)	2
US Billboard Hot 100	94
US Country Airplay (Billboard)	17
US Hot Country Songs (Billboard)	24

=== Year-end charts ===
2022 year-end chart performance for "Everything She Ain't"
Chart (2022)	Position
US Hot Country Songs (Billboard)	97

2023 year-end chart performance for "Everything She Ain't"
Chart (2023)	Position
US Country Airplay (Billboard)	40
US Hot Country Songs (Billboard)	37

== Certifications ==
Certifications for "Everything She Ain't"
Region	Certification	Certified units/sales
Canada (Music Canada)	Platinum	80,000^{‡}
United States (RIAA)	Platinum	1,000,000^{‡}
^{‡} Sales+streaming figures based on certification alone.
