= 1988 (Lori McKenna album) =

2023 studio album by Lori McKenna

Studio album by Lori McKenna
- Released: July 21, 2023
- Studio: Georgia Mae (Savannah, GA)
- Length: 36:51
- Label: CN Records
- Producer: Dave Cobb

Lori McKenna chronology
The Balladeer (2020)	1988 (2023)

1988 is the twelfth studio album by American singer-songwriter Lori McKenna. It was released on July 21, 2023, through CN Records and distributed by Thirty Tigers. It was preceded by the release of the lead single "Killing Me" on May 12, 2023. The album is named for the year McKenna and her husband Gene McKenna were married.

== Track listing ==
No.	Title	Writer(s)	Length
1.	"The Old Woman In Me"	Lori McKenna	3:52
2.	"Happy Children"	Lori McKenna, Chris McKenna	4:11
3.	"Killing Me" (featuring Hillary Lindsey)	Lori McKenna, Hillary Lindsey, Luke Laird	2:47
4.	"Days Are Honey"	Lori McKenna, Barry Dean, Luke Laird	3:00
5.	"1988"	Lori McKenna, Brian McKenna	3:57
6.	"Growing Up"	Lori McKenna	4:07
7.	"Wonder Drug"	Lori McKenna	3:53
8.	"The Town In Your Heart"	Lori McKenna, Jessie Jo Dillon, Dustin Christensen	3:53
9.	"Letting People Down"	Lori McKenna	2:56
10.	"The Tunnel"	Lori McKenna, Ben West, Stephen Wilson Jr.	4:15
Total length:			36:51

1988 (Deluxe), version released November 10, 2023, bonus tracks
No.	Title	Length
11.	"1988" (acoustic)
12.	"Killing Me" (featuring Hillary Lindsey) (acoustic)
13.	"Wonder Drug" (acoustic)
14.	"Happy Children" (acoustic)
15.	"The Town In Your Heart" (featuring Hillary Lindsey) (acoustic)

== Personnel ==
Credits for 1988 adapted from Allmusic.

- Lori McKenna - lead vocals, acoustic guitar
- Dave Cobb - producer, acoustic guitar, electric guitar, keyboards, mixing
- Hillary Lindsey - background vocals
- Kristen Rogers - background vocals
- Brian Allen - bass
- Chris Powell - drums, percussion
- Michael Webb - keyboards
- Brandon Bell - recording engineer, mixing
- Phillip Smith - assistant engineer
- Becky Fluke - photography
- Sidney Clawson - illustrations
- Rachel Briggs - design
