= Paper Wings and Halo =

Studio album by Lori McKenna
- Released: 1998
- Recorded: 1997–1998
- Venue: Club Passim • The Blackthorne Tavern • Fox Run Concerts
- Studio: Humming Lake: Brookline, New Hampshire
- Genres: Folk, country
- Labels: Gyrox, Catalyst Disc
- Producer: Seth Connelly

Lori McKenna chronology
Paper Wings and Halo (1998)	Pieces of Me (2001)

Alternative cover
- Original cover Gyrox release 1998

Paper Wings and Halo is the debut album by singer-songwriter Lori McKenna. The album was originally self-released by McKenna in 1998 under the Gyrox label, and was reissued June 25, 2002, by Signature Sounds under the Catalyst Disc label.

== Background ==
As Massachusetts mother Lori McKenna raised three children, and developed a hobby of writing songs to sing to them, she eventually became comfortable singing in front of friends and family who partied together some nights. In 1996 her sister-in-law Andrea thought the songs McKenna composed and her singing were exceptional, and encouraged her to try to sing professionally. Andrea decided to demand that McKenna come with her and others to The Old Vienna Kaffeehaus where McKenna had thought she might like to try an open mic night. The small folk club located in Westborough had a hand in launching music careers and was favored by well-known acts. After a well-received show, as McKenna was leaving the parking lot club operator Robert Haigh chased her down and stopped her to tell her he was impressed. Haigh asked McKenna to return and feature her songs in future sessions at the club. McKenna performed more shows there and at other venues when Haigh advised her that with $5000 she could record an album and release a CD. McKenna was making money which helped the struggling family pay bills and so determined to follow up on Haigh's advice. "Ruby's Shoes" was written by McKenna when her son was working on a school project about Ruby Bridges. The song has been used in education contexts to illustrate part of the civil rights legacy of Bridges.

== Recording ==
According to McKenna, credit for the recording of the self-released CD goes to Robert Haigh, who acted as her unofficial manager for a year and worked to line up a producer and studio for her. While most of the album was recorded at producer Seth Connelly's Humming Lake Studios in New Hampshire, two of the tracks were recorded from live performances.

== Reception ==
The CD was a major success, selling nearly 10,000 copies and landing on a "Top 10" review at the end of the year by The Boston Globe. At the annual Boston Music Awards of 1999, McKenna was honored as the best "New Contemporary Folk Act" of the year. McKenna was also noticed by Jim Olson of Signature Sounds Recordings who remarked that “there was definitely a buzz about her on the Boston coffee circuit. I liked the album a lot, but it wasn’t really until I saw her perform that I got it. She has a real charm and magnetism to her that attracted me as much as the music.” Olson signed McKenna to record a follow up album, and Signature reissued Paper Wings and Halo in 2002 with a different cover and three additional live recordings as bonus tracks. The songs were recorded at Fox Run Concerts, with one song off the original CD, the final track "Borrow Me", dropped to make room for the live songs.

== Track listing ==
All songs by Lori McKenna, except where noted.

1. "As I Am" - 3:25
2. "What's One More Time" - 4:04
3. "Paper Wings and Halo" - 4:34
4. "Ruby's Shoes" - 4:23
5. "Would You Love Me Then" - 4:38
6. "Hardly Speaking a Word" - 4:54
7. "It's Easy When You Smile" - 3:28
8. "Paying the Price" (Bob Giroux) - 5:18
9. "Swallows Me Whole" - 4:13 (recorded live at Club Passim, Cambridge)
10. "Don't Tell Her" - 5:03
11. "Holy Water" - 3:24 (recorded live at The Blackthorne Tavern, Easton)
12. "Never Be Back" - 4:29
13. "Borrow Me" - 5:10

2002 re-issue bonus tracks

13. "Not in This Life" - 4:23 (replaces "Borrow Me")
14. "Josephine" - 4:48
15. "Paper Wings and Halo" - 5:38
- Recorded live at Fox Run Concerts, Sudbury

== Personnel ==
as listed in the CD booklet, 2002 release

Musicians

- Lori McKenna - acoustic guitar, vocals, background vocals
- Seth Connelly - electric guitar, fretless bass, mandolin, keyboard, percussion
- Richard Giroux - background vocals
- Kris Delmhorst - cello, backing vocals
- Bob Giroux - piano, background vocals
- Susan Connelly - windchimes
- Meghan Toohey - electric guitar (15), backing vocals (15)

Production

- Seth Connelly - producer, recording (all but 9, 11, 13-15) , mixing (all but 13-15)
- Steve Friedman - recording (9, 11)
- Neale Eckstein - recording (13-15), mixing (13-15)
- Benjamin Eckstein - recording (13-15), mixing (13-15)
- Henk Kooistra - mastering, editing (all but 13-15)
- Dana White - mastering (13-15)
