= Pieces of Me (Lori McKenna album) =

Studio album by Lori McKenna
- Released: November 20, 2001
- Genre: Folk
- Label: Catalyst Disc, Signature Sounds
- Producer: Crit Harmon

Lori McKenna chronology
Paper Wings and Halo (1998)	Pieces of Me (2001)	The Kitchen Tapes (2003)

Professional ratings
Review scores
Source	Rating
Allmusic	4/5 stars
Country Music International	favorable
Dirty Linen	favorable
Harp	favorable
Sing Out!	favorable

Pieces of Me is the second album by singer-songwriter Lori McKenna. The album received favorable reviews.

She is supported on the album by a number of Boston area musicians. The bass playing of Mike Rivard and drumming of Billy Beard are particularly noteworthy. Ellis Paul, Richard Shindell and Kris Delmhorst all make appearances as vocalists.

== Track listing ==
All songs by Lori McKenna

1. "Mars" – 4:50
2. "Never Die Young" – 4:42
3. "God Will Thank You" – 3:32
4. "This Fire" – 4:30
5. "Fireflies" – 4:17
6. "Girl Like Me" – 3:33
7. "Instead" – 4:42
8. "Pink Sweater" – 4:17
9. "Deserving Song" – 4:15
10. "Pieces of Me" – 4:31
11. "You Are Loved" – 4:25
