= The Breaker (album) =

Studio album by Little Big Town
- Released: February 24, 2017
- Recorded: 2016
- Studio: St. Charles (Nashville, Tennessee)
- Genre: Country pop
- Length: 41:49
- Label: Capitol Nashville
- Producer: Jay Joyce

Little Big Town chronology
Wanderlust (2016)	The Breaker (2017)	Nightfall (2020)

Singles from The Breaker
- 1. "Better Man" Released: October 20, 2016; 2. "Happy People" Released: April 3, 2017; 3. "When Someone Stops Loving You" Released: June 26, 2017

The Breaker is the eighth studio album by American country music group Little Big Town. It was released on February 24, 2017, through Capitol Nashville. Reviews for the album were positive. The Breaker debuted atop the Top Country Albums chart and number four on the Billboard 200. The album also charted in countries like New Zealand, Canada and Australia. It spawned three singles: "Better Man", "Happy People" and "When Someone Stops Loving You". After giving several performances in Nashville's Ryman Auditorium that started on the album's release date, the group embarked on a worldwide tour to promote the record.

== Background ==
During a press conference at the Ryman Auditorium in November 2016, Little Big Town announced the album's title.

Singer-songwriter Taylor Swift single-handedly wrote the album's lead single, "Better Man", about the ending of a past relationship with a significant other. Swift claimed that she thought of Little Big Town and their trademark harmony vocals and subsequently sent the song to the group.

== Promotion ==
To help promote The Breaker, Little Big Town had a residency at the Ryman Auditorium, titled Little Big Town at the Mother Church, and began it the day of the album's release. The band originally announced six performances at the auditorium between February and September before announcing three additional shows with plans to announce more throughout the year. They also announced a six date UK tour.

"Happy People" was released as the first promotional single on February 3, 2017. "We Went to the Beach" was released as the second promotional single on February 10, 2017. "When Someone Stops Loving You" was released as the third and final promotional single on February 17, 2017.

To promote the album, Little Big Town embarked on The Breakers Tour which began on September 28, 2017, in the UK and concluded on May 5, 2018, in Atlanta. Opening acts included Seth Ennis, Kacey Musgraves and Midland. The band will also headline the C2C: Country to Country festival as part of the tour, where they will be joined by Midland, Margo Price and Emmylou Harris.

== Singles ==
"Better Man", the lead single from The Breaker, was released on October 20, 2016, and has sold 437,000 copies in the US as of February 2017. It peaked at number 1 on the US Billboard Hot Country Songs and Country Airplay charts. The song was written by Taylor Swift.

"Happy People" was released to country radio on April 3, 2017, as the second official single. It reached a peak of number 46 on the Country Airplay chart, becoming their lowest-peaking single to date.

"When Someone Stops Loving You" was released to radio on June 26, 2017, as the third official single.

== Critical reception ==
Professional ratings
Aggregate scores
Source	Rating
Metacritic	78/100
Review scores
Source	Rating
AllMusic	4/5 stars
Entertainment Weekly	A−
Paste	7.7/10
Rolling Stone	3/5 stars

The Breaker received widespread critical acclaim. At Metacritic, which assigns a normalized rating out of 100 to reviews from mainstream critics, the album has an average score of 78 based on 4 reviews, indicating "generally favorable reviews".

AllMusic's Stephen Thomas Erlewine rated the album four out of five stars and states, "Little Big Town cherish the gentler moments, and this ease with sensitivity turns The Breaker into something of a quiet triumph: it's intended as a balm, and it succeeds." Chuck Arnold of Entertainment Weekly gave the record an "A−" grade saying, "Although the rest of The Breaker may not be blessed with the T-Swizzle magic, there are some more strong contenders for your next breakup playlist." Rolling Stone writer Jonathan Bernstein praised the album for putting the spotlight back on the group's "unmatched ability to transform subtle Nashville lyricism into major pop drama", concluding that, "[A]t the top of their game, Little Big Town are taking an unlikely path: respectable, mid-career album artist."

=== Accolades ===
Publication	Rank	List
The Boot	3	5 Best Country Albums of 2017 So Far
TIME	N/A	10 Best Albums of 2017 So Far

== Commercial performance ==
The Breaker debuted at number one on Billboard's Top Country Albums chart and number four on the all-genre Billboard 200 with 51,000 album-equivalent units, of which 44,000 were pure album sales. It marks the group's third number one album on the Top Country Albums chart. The album sold 16,600 copies the second week. As of June 2018 the album has sold 171,400 copies in the United States.

== Track listing ==
All tracks are produced by Jay Joyce.

No.	Title	Writer(s)	Lead vocals	Length
1.	"Happy People"	Lori McKenna; Hailey Whitters	Karen Fairchild	2:47
2.	"Night on Our Side"	Phillip Sweet; Jimi Westbrook; Joyce; Jeremy Spillman; Ryan Tyndell	Jimi Westbrook	3:55
3.	"Lost in California"	McKenna; Hillary Lindsey; Liz Rose	Fairchild	4:47
4.	"Free"	McKenna; Barry Dean; Natalie Hemby; Luke Laird	Fairchild	3:28
5.	"Drivin' Around"	Kameron Alexander; David Embree; Audra Mae; Todd Spadafore	Fairchild	3:15
6.	"We Went to the Beach"	Matt Jenkins; Chase McGill; Laura Veltz	Phillip Sweet	3:07
7.	"Better Man"	Taylor Swift	Fairchild	4:23
8.	"Rollin'"	Sweet; Westbrook; Hemby	Westbrook	2:37
9.	"Don't Die Young, Don't Get Old"	Karen Fairchild; Kimberly Schlapman; Lindsey; McKenna; Liz Rose	Fairchild	3:15
10.	"Beat Up Bible"	Lindsey; Cary Barlowe; Shane Stevens	Kimberly Schlapman	3:35
11.	"When Someone Stops Loving You"	Lindsey; McGill; McKenna	Westbrook	3:49
12.	"The Breaker"	Connie Harrington; TJ Osborne	Sweet	2:51
Total length:				41:49

== Personnel ==
Adapted from The Breaker liner notes.

Little Big Town

- Karen Fairchild – vocals
- Kimberly Schlapman – vocals
- Phillip Sweet – vocals, keyboards
- Jimi Westbrook – vocals

Additional musicians

- Jay Joyce – keyboards, programming, electric guitar, bass guitar, drums, percussion
- Jedd Hughes – guitars
- John Osborne – guitars
- Evan Weatherford – guitars
- John Thomasson – bass guitar
- Hubert Payne – drums, percussion

Production

- Jay Joyce – producer, recording, mixing
- Jason Hall – recording, mixing
- Jaxon Hargrove – recording assistant, mix assistant
- Jimmy Mansfield – recording assistant, mix assistant
- Richard Dodd – mastering at RichardDodd.com (Nashville, Tennessee)

== Awards ==
Year	Association	Category	Result
2017	CMA Awards	Album of the Year	Nominated
2018	Grammy Awards	Best Country Album	Nominated
2018	ACM Awards	Album of the Year	Nominated

== Charts ==
=== Weekly charts ===
Chart (2017)	Peak position
Australian Albums (ARIA)	26
Canadian Albums (Billboard)	15
New Zealand Heatseekers Albums (RMNZ)	10
Scottish Albums (Official Charts)	23
UK Albums (Official Charts)	65
UK Country Albums (Official Charts)	1
US Billboard 200	4
US Top Country Albums (Billboard)	1

=== Year-end charts ===
Chart (2017)	Position
US Billboard 200	199
US Top Country Albums (Billboard)	26

== Certifications ==
Region	Certification	Certified units/sales
United States (RIAA)	Gold	500,000^{‡}
^{‡} Sales+streaming figures based on certification alone.
