= The Bird and the Rifle =

Studio album by Lori McKenna
- Released: September 29, 2016
- Studios: Low Country Sound (Nashville, Tennessee)
- Length: 36:56
- Label: CN Records
- Producer: Dave Cobb

Lori McKenna chronology
Numbered Doors (2014)	The Bird and the Rifle (2016)	The Tree (2018)

The Bird and the Rifle is the ninth studio album by American singer-songwriter Lori McKenna, released on July 29, 2016, through CN Records. It includes the song "Humble and Kind", which was written by McKenna and first recorded by Tim McGraw for his 2015 album Damn Country Music. Despite the album's limited commercial success (it never charted on the Billboard 200), it earned critical acclaim and was nominated for Best Americana Album at the 59th Annual Grammy Awards.

== Background ==
In an interview with The Guardian, McKenna said that "there were more stories and characters on the last record, I felt like this record could be one character in different places in their life and relationships". Despite the album's focus on relationship breakdown, McKenna herself has not experienced it but says that "everybody, to one extent or another, knows the feeling". Of the title track, McKenna states that "people think it's a sad song, or they'll have to ask why I have a gun thing going on" but she reasons that "most people have felt that in a relationship".

The title of the record came from Haley's 21st Birthday, a sixth-season episode of Modern Family where two of the characters briefly debated getting matching bird and rifle tattoos. Of this, McKenna noted "you never know where song ideas are gonna come from", mentioning that she was ironing with the television on in the background when the idea originated.

The album was recorded live, the signature method of producer Dave Cobb, who was introduced to McKenna by the co-owner of her production company who wanted to encourage McKenna to record a new album despite the fact she didn't see her number of releases "increasing anytime soon". Of the decision to include "Humble and Kind", McKenna and Cobb were both in agreement.

"Humble and Kind" was covered by Tim McGraw for his 2015 album Damn Country Music. McGraw's version won the American Music Award for Favourite Country Song as well as the CMT Award for Video of the Year.

== Critical reception ==
Professional ratings
Aggregate scores
Source	Rating
Metacritic	82/100
Review scores
Source	Rating
AllMusic	4/5 stars
The New York Times	Positive
Pitchfork	7.6/10
Rolling Stone	4/5 stars

The Bird and the Rifle received highly positive reviews from music critics. At Metacritic, which assigns a normalized rating out of 100 to reviews from mainstream critics, the album has an average score of 82 out of 100, which indicates "universal acclaim" based on 4 reviews.

Timothy Monger at AllMusic awarded the album four out of five stars and deemed it "another extremely strong effort for Lori McKenna, whose growing catalogue is already known for its quality." Ann Powers at NPR Music called The Bird and The Rifle "one of 2016's best releases", in part, due to "Humble and Kind", which manages to be "both widely resonant and specific". Powers also praised McKenna's voice, which she describes as "powerful but never grandiose, as if she's telling you something important but doesn't want to make a fuss." Stephen Deusner from Pitchfork celebrated the track "We Were Cool", likening McKenna to Bruce Springsteen, stating that "McKenna knows that the power of a barbed lyric or a rich character relies on a bold melody and a patient vocal, and more than anything else her vocals put these songs across and make these stories relatable". Similarly, Jon Pareles of The New York Times also praised McKenna's voice as a "taut, lived in soprano that can take on a flutter or a rasp close to the country of earlier generations" and pointing out that the strength in her songwriting is the "mundane yet illuminating detail."

Publication	Work	Rank	List	Ref
American Songwriter	Humble and Kind	1	Top 50 Songs of 2016	
The Boot	Humble and Kind	1	Top 10 Country Music Songs of 2016	
Entertainment Weekly	The Bird and The Rifle	10	Best Country Albums of 2016	
Nashville Scene	The Bird and The Rifle	6	2017 Country Critics Poll - Top 30 Albums	
Nashville Scene	Wreck You	17	2017 Country Critics Poll - Top 25 Songs	
No Depression	The Bird and The Rifle	50	50 Best Albums of 2016	
NPR	The Bird and The Rifle	34	50 Best Albums of 2016	
Rolling Stone	The Bird and The Rifle	8	40 Best Country Albums of 2016	
Rolling Stone Country	Humble and Kind	10	25 Best Country Songs of 2016	
Rolling Stone Country	The Bird and The Rifle	8	40 Best Country Albums of 2016	
Sounds Like Nashville	The Bird and The Rifle	10	16 Best Country Albums of 2016	
Stereogum	The Bird and The Rifle	2	The 20 Best Country Albums of 2016	

=== Accolades ===
McKenna became the first solo woman since Jennifer Nettles in 2008 to win the Song of the Year award at the Country Music Association Awards and only the fifth solo female overall to win (following Nettles, Kimberly Perry, Gretchen Peters and K.T. Oslin). Furthermore, McKenna is the only woman to win the CMA award back-to-back for different songs (following 2015's Girl Crush) and only the fourth songwriter overall to do so (after Paul Overstreet, Don Schlitz and Vince Gill). "Humble and Kind" won the award for Best Country Song at the 59th Annual Grammy Awards, while the album was nominated for Best Americana Album, and "Wreck You" for Best American Roots Performance and Best American Roots Song.

Year	Award	Category	Nominated work	Result
2016	CMA Awards	Song of the Year	"Humble and Kind"	Won
2017	Grammy Awards	Best Country Song	"Humble and Kind"	Won
2017	Grammy Awards	Best Americana Album	The Bird and The Rifle	Nominated
2017	Grammy Awards	Best American Roots Song (with Felix McTeigue)	"Wreck You"	Nominated
2017	Grammy Awards	Best American Roots Performance	"Wreck You"	Nominated
2017	Americana Music Honors & Awards	Song of the Year	"Wreck You"	Nominated

== Track listing ==
No.	Title	Writer(s)	Length
1.	"Wreck You"	Lori McKenna, Felix McTeigue	3:18
2.	"The Bird and the Rifle"	McKenna, Caitlyn Smith, Troy Verges	4:24
3.	"Giving Up on Your Hometown"	McKenna	4:15
4.	"Halfway Home"	McKenna, Barry Dean	4:19
5.	"Humble and Kind"	McKenna	4:03
6.	"We Were Cool"	McKenna	3:22
7.	"Old Men Young Women"	McKenna, Dean, Luke Laird	3:42
8.	"All These Things"	McKenna, Liz Rose	3:05
9.	"Always Want You"	McKenna, Rose, Hillary Lindsey	4:06
10.	"If Whiskey Were a Woman"	McKenna	3:22
Total length:			36:56

== Personnel ==
Credits adapted from AllMusic.

Musicians

- Brian Allen - bass guitar
- Dave Cobb - electric guitar, acoustic guitar, hi string guitar, Mellotron
- Barry Dean - background vocals
- Luke Laird - guitar
- Hillary Lindsey - background vocals
- Lori McKenna - vocals, guitar
- Christopher Powell - drums
- Kristen Rogers - background vocals
- Mike "Mojo" Webb - piano, Mellotron

Technical Personnel

- Evie Coates - illustrations
- Dave Cobb - mixing, producer
- Becky Fluke - photography
- Pete Lyman - mastering
- Matt Ross-Spang - mixing, engineer
- Shane Stern - production coordination

== Charts ==
Chart (2016)	Peak position
US Top Country Albums (Billboard)	19
US Americana/Folk Albums (Billboard)	4
US Heatseekers Albums (Billboard)	6
US Independent Albums (Billboard)	15
US Top Rock Albums (Billboard)	23

== Release history ==
Source: Amazon.com

Region	Date	Format(s)	Label
United States	July 29, 2016	CD; digital download; vinyl	CN Records
