= Hailey Whitters =

American singer-songwriter

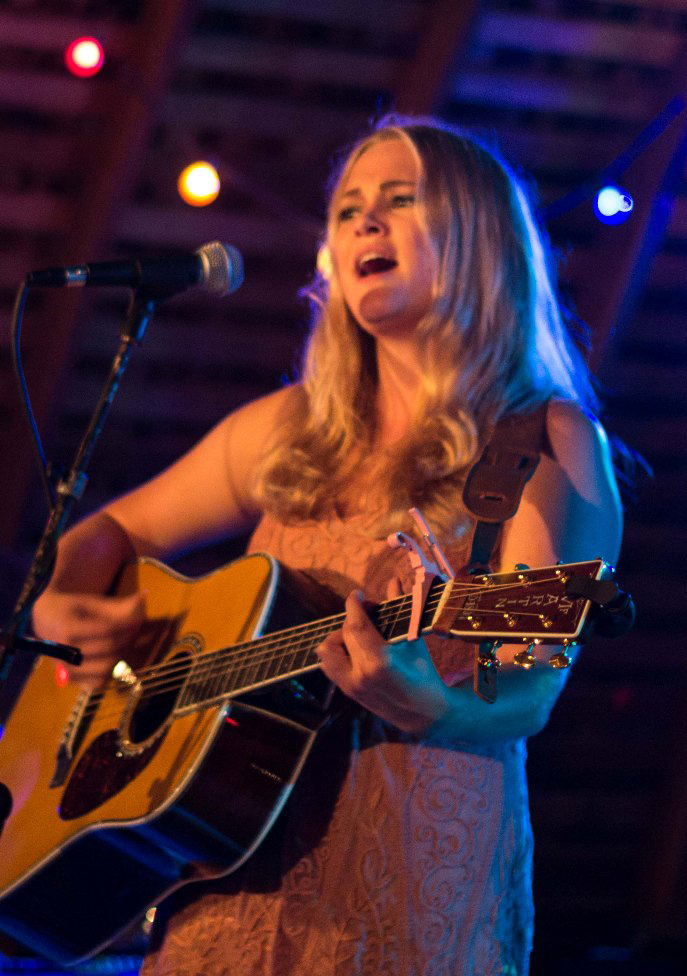
- Whitters in 2014

Background information
- Born: Hailey Faith Whitters; September 9, 1989 (age 37); Shueyville, Iowa, United States
- Genre: Country
- Occupation: Singer-songwriter
- Instruments: Vocals, guitar, banjo
- Years active: 2015–present
- Labels: Carnival; Pigasus; Big Loud; Songs & Daughters
- Website: haileywhitters.com

Hailey Faith Whitters (born September 9, 1989) is an American country music singer originally from Shueyville, Iowa. She attended Prairie High School in Cedar Rapids.

== Songwriting and music career ==
Whitters has written songs for Little Big Town and Alan Jackson, and has written with Lori McKenna. Whitters has toured with Little Big Town, opened for Luke Combs on his 2024 Growin' Up and Gettin' Old tour and also Maren Morris on her 2019 Girl: The World Tour. Whitters released her debut full-length album in 2015 titled Black Sheep. Whitters co-wrote Little Big Town's song "Happy People", from their 2017 album The Breaker. On September 13, 2019, Whitters released an extended play titled "The Days", which serves as the first half of her upcoming album, "The Dream". On January 24, 2020, Whitters released a single called "Janice at the Hotel Bar", written with her frequent collaborator Lori McKenna. In June 2020, Whitters signed with Big Loud Records’ imprint Songs & Daughters.

Whitters' third album, Living The Dream, was released on January 21, 2021. It is a reissue of The Dream with five new songs, duets with Brent Cobb, Jordan Davis, Trisha Yearwood, Little Big Town and Lori McKenna & Hillary Lindsey. Whitters' fourth album, Raised, was released on March 18, 2022 and became her first album to reach the Billboard charts, debuting at #18 on the Heatseekers Albums chart and staying on the chart for 6 weeks, later hitting a peak of #9. Raised was preceded by the release of songs "Everything She Ain't" and "The Neon". The former would go on to be released to country radio in June 2022. To support the album, Whitters embarked on The Heartland Tour as well as supported Jon Pardi's Ain't Always The Cowboy Tour during the summer of 2022.

Whitters announced her fifth album, Corn Queen, on April 4, 2025. It was released on June 6, 2025 and was preceded by the promotional singles "Casseroles", "Prodigal Daughter" (with Molly Tuttle), "High on the Hog", and "High on a Heartbreak".

== Discography ==
=== Studio albums ===
List of studio albums, with selected details, chart positions and sales
| Title | Album details | Peak chart positions | | Sales |
| Title | Album details | US Heat. | US Current | Sales |
|---|---|---|---|---|
| Black Sheep | Release date: October 2, 2015; Label: Carnival Recording Company; Format: CD, digital download | — | — | |
| The Dream | Release date: February 28, 2020; Label: Pigasus; Format: CD, digital download, LP | — | — | US: 300 |
| Raised | Release date: March 18, 2022; Label: Pigasus, Big Loud; Format: CD, digital download, LP | 9 | 90 | |
| Corn Queen | Release date: June 6, 2025; Label: Pigasus, Big Loud; Format: CD, digital download, LP | — | — | |

=== Extended plays ===
List of EPs, with selected details
| Title | EP details |
|---|---|
| I'm in Love | Release date: July 28, 2023; Label: Pigasus, Big Loud; Format: Digital download |

=== Singles ===
==== As lead artist ====
List of singles, with selected chart positions
| Title | Year | Peak chart positions | | | | | Certifications | Album |
| Title | Year | US | US Country Songs | US Country Airplay | CAN | CAN Country | Certifications | Album |
|---|---|---|---|---|---|---|---|---|
| "Everything She Ain't" | 2022 | 94 | 24 | 17 | 73 | 2 | RIAA: Platinum | Raised |
| "I'm in Love" | 2023 | — | — | 47 | — | — | | I'm in Love |
| "Casseroles" | 2025 | — | — | — | — | 50 | | Corn Queen |

==== As featured artist ====
List of singles as featured artist
| Title | Year | Peak chart positions | | Album |
| Title | Year | US Country Airplay | CAN Country | Album |
|---|---|---|---|---|
| "Roulette on the Heart" (Conner Smith with Hailey Whitters) | 2024 | 58 | — | Smoky Mountains |
| "Drinkin' Buddies" (Lee Brice with Nate Smith and Hailey Whitters) | 2024 | 26 | 59 | Sunriser |

== Awards and nominations ==
| Year | Organization | Award | Nominee/Work | Result |
|---|---|---|---|---|
| 2021 | CMT Music Awards | Breakthrough Video of the Year | "Fillin' My Cup" | Nominated |
| 2022 | Grammy Awards | Song of the Year | "A Beautiful Noise" | Nominated |
| 2023 | Academy of Country Music Awards | New Female Artist of the Year | Hailey Whitters | Won |
| 2023 | Country Music Association Awards | New Artist of the Year | Hailey Whitters | Nominated |

== In popular culture ==
On September 5th, 2025 the local business Big Grove Brewery released a beer called Corn Queen in recognition of Whitters' fourth album and her connection to the greater Iowa City area. "Working with Big Grove on Corn Queen has been such a fun experience. This beer celebrates my roots, and the joy of sharing good music with good people. We’ve created something that truly represents Iowa – a beer that fans can enjoy while celebrating the music and the heart of the Midwest,” said Whitters.
