= Lori McKenna =

American singer-songwriter (born 1968)

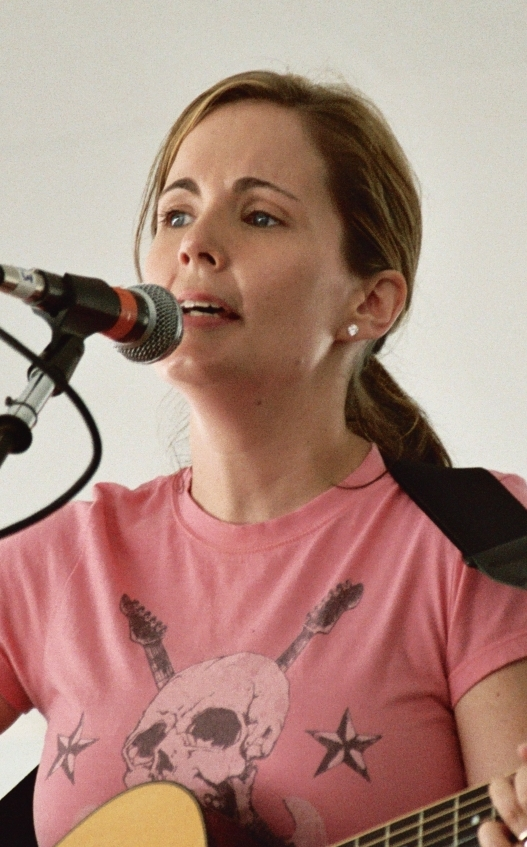
- McKenna in 2006

Background information
- Born: Lorraine Giroux; December 22, 1968 (age 57); Stoughton, Massachusetts, U.S.
- Genres: Country; folk; Americana
- Occupation: Singer-songwriter
- Instruments: Vocals; guitar
- Years active: 1998–present
- Labels: Warner Bros.; Signature Sounds; Universal; Creative Nation
- Website: lorimckenna.com

Lorraine McKenna (née Giroux; born December 22, 1968) is an American folk, Americana, and country music singer-songwriter. In 2016, she was nominated for the Grammy Award for Song of the Year and won Best Country Song for co-writing the hit single "Girl Crush" performed by Little Big Town. In 2017, she again won Best Country Song at the 59th Annual Grammy Awards for writing "Humble and Kind" performed by Tim McGraw. McKenna along with Lady Gaga, Natalie Hemby and Hillary Lindsey wrote the second single off the soundtrack to the 2018 film A Star Is Born called "Always Remember Us This Way." McKenna performed backing vocals along with Lindsey and Hemby, and the song received a nomination for Song of the Year at the 62nd Annual Grammy Awards.

== Early and personal life ==
McKenna was born and raised in Stoughton, Massachusetts, where she still lives today. Her mother died when she was seven years old, a theme often touched on in her music. She met her husband, Gene McKenna, in third grade and married him at age 19. As of 2017, she has five children and has been married for more than 30 years.

McKenna first started writing lullabies to her children. Her brother, who first introduced her to the guitar, encouraged her to attend an open-mic night at the Old Vienna Kaffeehause in Westborough, Massachusetts in 1996. The organizer heard her play and encouraged her to come back, becoming her informal manager and booking shows for her around Boston.

== Career ==
McKenna was managed by Gabriel Unger from 2000 to 2004. During this time, she released her first four albums under Signature Sounds and developed a folk music fan base in the Northeast. She won awards at the Boston Music Awards, and performed at the Sundance Film Festival.

In 2004, singer-songwriter Mary Gauthier introduced McKenna's album Bittertown to her Nashville friends. Upon hearing it, Faith Hill stalled her completed 2005 record Fireflies to replace tracks with covers of McKenna's songs. Hill and husband Tim McGraw became McKenna's champions and asked her to tour with them in 2006. Hill took McKenna to perform with her on the Oprah Winfrey Show. McGraw helped bring McKenna to Warner Bros. Nashville in 2007 and produced her album Unglamorous. Following the lackluster sales, she parted ways with Warner Bros. She then signed with Universal Music Group Publishing in 2009 and independently released her next album Lorraine in 2011.

Since then, McKenna has become "one of the industry’s most in-demand songwriters." She has written songs for artists including Sara Evans, Reba McEntire, Tim McGraw, Carrie Underwood, and Keith Urban. She wrote 10 songs that made it to the Billboard Hot Country list, including Hunter Hayes' "I Want Crazy", Faith Hill's "Stealing Kisses", Tim McGraw's "Humble and Kind"; and Little Big Town's "Your Side of the Bed", "Sober", and "Girl Crush."

Collaborating with songwriters Hillary Lindsey and Liz Rose, McKenna co-wrote the song "Girl Crush", and it became a hit for the band Little Big Town. The song received Grammy nominations for both Song of the Year and Best Country Song, winning the latter in 2016. The song was nominated for Song of the Year Song at the Academy of Country Music Awards, and won Song of the Year at the Country Music Association Awards.

The Grammy for Best Country Song in 2016 was awarded to "Humble and Kind" which was written by McKenna and recorded by Tim McGraw. McKenna wrote the song as "lullaby, guidebook, and tribute" to her five children. The song was named Song of the Year at the 2016 CMA Awards and won favorite country song at the American Music Awards the same year. In 2017, "Humble and Kind" was nominated for Song of the Year and Single Record of the Year at the ACM Awards. McKenna was named Songwriter of the Year at the ACM's that same year.

McKenna has received critical acclaim for her album The Bird and the Rifle. The album was produced by Dave Cobb and nominated for Best Americana Album at the 59th annual Grammy Awards, and the single "Wreck You" was nominated for Best American Roots Song and Best American Roots Performance. McKenna was nominated for the 2017 Americana Music Awards Artist of the Year. Her 10th studio album, The Tree, was produced by Dave Cobb and released in summer 2018 through Thirty Tiger Records.

Creative Nation, a Nashville-based company owned and operated by songwriter Luke Laird and his wife Beth, signed McKenna to a management and publishing deal in 2015. On September 25, 2018, McKenna signed a publishing deal with Creative Nation for a three-year deal. In 2020, McKenna released her eleventh album, The Balladeer, through CN Records and Thirty Tigers. Music critic Robert Christgau hailed it as "the most consistently top-notch album of her late-blooming career".

"A Beautiful Noise" is a 2020 song collaboration by McKenna with 7 other female writers - Alicia Keys, Brandi Carlile, Brandy Clark, Hillary Lindsey, Ruby Amanfu, Hailey Whitters and Linda Perry. Performed by Alicia Keys and Brandi Carlile, the song was produced with the purpose of inspiring American voters to vote in the 2020 Presidential Election. Singer-songwriter Taylor Swift released her second re-recorded album Red (Taylor's Version) in 2021, including a song called "I Bet You Think About Me" featuring Chris Stapleton. The song was written by Swift and McKenna in 2011.

The award for Best Country Song at the 63rd Annual Grammy Awards was won by "Crowded Table", sung by The Highwomen. The song was written in a collaborative effort by McKenna, Natalie Hemby and Brandi Carlile.

== Discography ==
=== Studio albums ===
Title	Album details	Peak chart positions					Sales
Title	Album details	US Country	US	US Heat	US Folk	US Indie	Sales
Paper Wings and Halo	Release date: March 24, 2000; Label: Gyrox Records / Catalyst Disc / Signature Sounds	—	—	—	—	—	
Pieces of Me	Release date: November 20, 2001; Label: Signature Sounds / Catalyst Disc	—	—	—	—	—	
The Kitchen Tapes	Release date: February 10, 2004; Label: Gyrox Records	—	—	—	—	—	
Bittertown	Release date: May 11, 2004; Label: Signature Sounds / Warner Bros. Nashville	—	—	—	—	—	
Unglamorous	Release date: August 14, 2007; Label: Warner Bros. Nashville	19	109	1	—	—	
Lorraine	Release date: January 25, 2011; Label: Signature Sounds	—	196	5	6	30	
Massachusetts	Release date: April 23, 2013; Label: 1-2-3-4-GO!	—	—	11	18	—	
Numbered Doors	Release date: September 23, 2014; Label: Hoodie Songs	—	—	25	13	—	
The Bird and the Rifle	Release date: July 29, 2016; Label: CN Records	19	—	6	4	15	US: 4,500
The Tree	Release date: July 20, 2018; Label: CN Records/ Thirty Tigers	39	—	1	9	4	US: 5,100
The Balladeer	Release date: July 24, 2020; Label: CN Records	—	—	20	25	—	
1988	Release date: July 21, 2023; Label: CN Records	—	—	—	—	—	
"—" denotes releases that did not chart

=== Songwriting ===
Year	Artist	Album	Song title	Co-Writers
2004	Carol Laula	To Let	"Broken Inside"	
2005	Faith Hill	Fireflies	"If You Ask"	
2005	Faith Hill	Fireflies	"Fireflies"	
2005	Faith Hill	Fireflies	"Stealing Kisses"	
2005	Faith Hill	Fireflies	"Lone Star"	
2005	Sara Evans	Real Fine Place	"Bible Song"	
2007	Tim McGraw	Let It Go	"I’m Workin’"	Darrell Scott
2007	Mandy Moore	Wild Hope	"Most of Me"	Mandy Moore
2007	Mandy Moore	Wild Hope	"Latest Mistake"	Mandy Moore
2007	Mandy Moore	Wild Hope	"Can't You Just Adore Her?"	Mandy Moore
2007	Mandy Moore	Wild Hope	"Swept Away"	Mandy Moore
2007	Jimmy Ryan	Fun with Music	"My Last Whiskey Song"	Jimmy Ryan
2008	Vance Gilbert	Up on Rockfield	"House of Prayer"	Vance Gilbert
2008	Jimmy Wayne	Do You Believe Me Now	"True Believer"	Liz Rose
2008	Heidi Newfield	What I Am Waiting For	"Wreck You"	Edward McTeigue
2009	Mandy Moore	Amanda Leigh	"Everblue"	Mandy Moore
2009	Alexandra Samson	Takin’ My Time	"I See Smoke"	Liz Rose
2009	Alexandra Samson	Takin’ My Time	"I Don’t Think I Deserve This"	Liz Rose
2010	Ashley Ray	Ashley Ray	"Figured it Out"	
2010	Keith Urban	Get Closer	"The Luxury of Knowing"	
2010	Melissa Ferrick	Enough About Me	"How to be Righteous"	
2011	Melissa Rae Barrie	Breakaway	"Adore Her"	Mandy Moore
2011	Steel Magnolia	Steel Magnolia	"Bullet Proof"	Chris Tompkins
2011	Sunny Sweeney	Concrete	"The Old Me"	Mark D. Sanders
2011	Alison Krauss	Paper Airplane	"My Love Follows You Where You Go"	Barry Dean; Liz Rose
2012	Ashley Monroe	Like a Rose	"The Morning After"	Ashley Monroe; Liz Rose
2012	Trent Dabbs	Southerner	"Can I Cross Your Mind"	Trent Dabbs
2012	Mindy Smith	Mindy Smith	"Devils Inside"	Mindy Smith
2012	Buffy Lawson	I’m Leaving You for Me	"Lightning in a Bottle"	Ashley Monroe; Liz Rose
2012	Meghan Sheehan	About Love	"Break Me in Two"	Liz Rose; Jesse Sheely
2012	Walt Wilkins	Plenty	"Gray Hawk"	Liz Rose; Walt Wilkins
2013	Hunter Hayes	Encore	"I Want Crazy"	Hunter Hayes, Troy Verges
2013	Little Big Town	Tornado	"Your Side of the Bed"	Karen Fairchild; Kimberly Schlapman; Phillip Sweet; Jimi Westbrook
2013	Little Big Town	Tornado	"Sober"	Hillary Lindsey; Liz Rose
2013	Drew Kennedy	Wide Listener	"Rose of Jericho"	Drew Kennedy
2013	Drew Kennedy	Wide Listener	"Sleeping Alone"	Drew Kennedy
2013	Trent Dabbs	The Way We Look at Horses	"Natural Causes"	Trent Dabbs
2013	Holly Williams	The Highway	"Without You"	Holly Williams
2014	Little Big Town	Pain Killer	"Tumble and Fall"	Karen Fairchild; Hillary Lindsey; Liz Rose; Kimberly Schlapman
2014	Little Big Town	Pain Killer	"Save Your Sin"	Hillary Lindsey; Liz Rose
2014	Caitlyn Smith	Everything to You EP	"Everything to You"	Liz Rose; Caitlyn Smith
2014	Caitlyn Smith	Everything to You EP	"Grown Woman"	Liz Rose; Caitlyn Smith
2014	Angaleena Presley	American Middle Class	"Grocery Store"	Angaleena Presley
2014	Wade Bowen	Wade Bowen	"Long Enough to be a Memory"	Wade Bowen; Ashley Ray
2014	Doc Walker	The 8th	"That’s How I Like It"	Liz Rose; Nathan Chapman
2014	Antigone Rising	Whiskey & Wine Vol. 1	"That Was the Whiskey"	Nini Camps Cathy Henderson; Kristen Henderson
2014	Antigone Rising	Whiskey & Wine Vol. 1	"Call Me Crazy"	Nini Camps Cathy Henderson; Kristen Henderson
2014	Jill Johnson	Songs for Daddy	"No Other Daddy but You"	Lisa Carver; Jill Johnson; Liz Rose
2015	Little Big Town	Pain Killer	"Girl Crush"	Hillary Lindsey; Liz Rose
2015	Antigone Rising	Whiskey & Wine Vol. 2	"Game Changer"	Nini Camps Cathy Henderson; Kristen Henderson
2015	Antigone Rising	Whiskey & Wine Vol. 2	"My Town"	Nini Camps Cathy Henderson; Kristen Henderson
2015	RaeLynn	Me EP	"God Made Girls"	Nicolle Galyon; RaeLynn; Liz Rose
2015	Amber Lawrence	–	"I Will Love You"	Phil Barton; Kylie Sackley
2015	Reba McEntire	Love Somebody	"Until They Don’t Love You"	Shane McAnally; Josh Osborne
2015	Hunter Hayes	The 21 Project	"Saint or A Sinner"	Barry Dean; Hunter Hayes
2016	Tim McGraw	Damn Country Music	"Humble and Kind"	
2016	LeAnn Rimes	Remnants	"How To Kiss A Boy"	Barry Dean
2016	Brandy Clark	Big Day in a Small Town	"Three Kids No Husband"	Brandy Clark
2016	Native Run	When I’m Taken EP	"BIC Lighter"	Barry Dean; Luke Laird
2016	David Nail	Fighter	Home	Barry Dean; David Nail
2016	Kree Harrison	This Old Thing	"The Time I’ve Wasted"	Liz Rose; Jesse Walker
2017	Little Big Town	The Breaker	"When Someone Stops Loving You"	Hillary Lindsey; Chase McGill
2017	Little Big Town	The Breaker	"Happy People"	Hailey Whitters
2017	Little Big Town	The Breaker	"Free"	Barry Dean; Natalie Hemby; Luke Laird
2017	Little Big Town	The Breaker	"Lost in California"	Hillary Lindsey; Liz Rose
2017	Little Big Town	The Breaker	"Don’t Die Young, Don’t Get Old"	Karen Fairchild; Hillary Lindsey; Kimberly Schlapman
2017	Eli Young Band	Fingerprints	"Skin & Bones"	Phil Barton; Mike Eli
2017	Jillian Jacqueline	Side A (EP)	"God Bless this Mess"	Tofer Brown; Jillian Jacqueline
2017	Tim McGraw & Faith Hill	The Rest of Our Life	"The Bed We Made"	Hillary Lindsey; Liz Rose
2017	Tim McGraw & Faith Hill	The Rest of Our Life	"Damn Good at Holding On"	Barry Dean
2017	The Cadillac Three	Legacy	"American Slang"	Jaren Johnston; Neil Mason
2017	The Cadillac Three	Legacy	"Love Me like Liquor feat. Lori McKenna"	Jaren Johnston; Neil Mason
2017	Sunny Sweeney	Trophy	"Nothing Wrong with Texas"	Sunny Sweeney
2017	Sunny Sweeney	Trophy	"Grow Old with Me"	Sunny Sweeney
2017	Natalie Stovall	–	"Wine or Whiskey"	Andrew Dorf; Jimi Westbook
2017	Brandon Rhyder	Brandon Rhyder	"They Need Each Other"	Brandon Rhyder
2017	Brandon Rhyder	Brandon Rhyder	"Shake"	
2018	Carrie Underwood	Cry Pretty	"Cry Pretty"	Hillary Lindsey; Liz Rose; Carrie Underwood
2018	Glen Phillips	Swallowed by the New	"Nobody’s Gonna Get Hurt"	Glen Phillips
2018	Jillian Jacqueline	Sad Girls	"Sad Girls"	Jillian Jacqueline; Tofer Brown
2019	Sara Bareilles	Amidst the Chaos	"Miss Simone"	Sara Bareilles
2019	Sara Bareilles	Amidst the Chaos	"Saint Honesty"	Sara Bareilles
2019	Sara Bareilles	Amidst the Chaos	"A Safe Place to Land"	Sara Bareilles
2019	Lady Gaga	A Star Is Born	"Always Remember Us This Way"	Lady Gaga; Natalie Hemby; Hillary Lindsey
2019	The Highwomen	The Highwomen	"Crowded Table"	Brandi Carlile; Natalie Hemby
2020	Mandy Moore	Silver Landings	"If That's What It Takes"	Mandy Moore; Mike Viola; Taylor Goldsmith
2020	Cam	The Otherside	"Forgetting You"	Cam; Tyler Johnson; Mitch Rowland
2020	Cam	The Otherside	"Like a Movie"	Cam; Hillary Lindsey; Liz Rose
2020	Cam	The Otherside	"Changes"	Thomas Hull; Tyler Johnson; Harry Styles
2020	Alicia Keys & Brandi Carlile	–	"A Beautiful Noise"	Alicia Keys; Brandi Carlile, Ruby Amanfu; Brandy Clark; Hillary Lindsey; Hailey Whitters and Linda Perry
2021	Taylor Swift	Red (Taylor's Version)	"I Bet You Think About Me" (featuring Chris Stapleton)	Taylor Swift
2022	Maren Morris	Humble Quest	"Hummingbird"	Maren Morris; Hillary Lindsey; and Liz Rose
2022	Thomas Rhett	Where We Started	"The Hill"	Jordan Reynolds; Emily Weisband
2024	Madi Diaz	Weird Faith	"Weird Faith"	Madi Diaz

== Awards and nominations ==
Year	Association	Category	Nominated work	Result
2015	Country Music Association Awards	Song of the Year	"Girl Crush"	Won
2016	Grammy Awards	Song of the Year	"Girl Crush"	Nominated
2016	Grammy Awards	Best Country Song	"Girl Crush"	Won
2016	Academy of Country Music Awards	Song of the Year	"Girl Crush"	Nominated
2016	Country Music Association Awards	Song of the Year	"Humble and Kind"	Won
2017	Grammy Awards	Best Country Song	"Humble and Kind"	Won
2017	Grammy Awards	Best American Roots Performance	"Wreck You"	Nominated
2017	Grammy Awards	Best American Roots Song	"Wreck You"	Nominated
2017	Grammy Awards	Best Americana Album	The Bird and the Rifle	Nominated
2017	Academy of Country Music Awards	Songwriter of the Year	Lori McKenna	Won
2017	Academy of Country Music Awards	Song of the Year	"Humble and Kind"	Nominated
2017	Americana Music Honors & Awards	Artist of the Year	Lori McKenna	Nominated
2017	Americana Music Honors & Awards	Song of the Year	"Wreck You"	Nominated
2018	Grammy Awards	Best Country Song	"When Someone Stops Loving You"	Nominated
2019	Grammy Awards	Song of the Year	"It All Comes Out in the Wash"	Nominated
2019	Grammy Awards	Best Country Song	"Always Remember Us This Way"	Nominated
2019	Americana Music Honors & Awards	Album of the Year	The Tree	Nominated
2019	Americana Music Honors & Awards	Song of the Year	"People Get Old"	Nominated
2019	Americana Music Honors & Awards	Song of the Year	"By Degrees" (with Mark Erelli, Rosanne Cash, Sheryl Crow, Anaïs Mitchell and Josh Ritter)	Nominated
2020	Grammy Awards	Best Country Song	"Crowded Table"	Won
2021	Grammy Awards	Song of the Year	"A Beautiful Noise"	Nominated
2022	Grammy Awards	Best Country Song	"I Bet You Think About Me (Taylor's Version) (From the Vault)"	Nominated
