= My Kind of Christmas (Reba McEntire album) =

Studio album by Reba McEntire
- Released: September 2, 2016
- Recorded: 2016
- Studio: Starstruck Studios (Nashville)
- Genre: Country; Christmas
- Length: 32:06
- Label: Nash Icon
- Producer: Reba McEntire; Doug Sisemore

Reba McEntire chronology
| Love Somebody (2015) | My Kind of Christmas (2016) | Sing It Now: Songs of Faith & Hope (2017) |

Singles from My Kind of Christmas
- 1. "Hard Candy Christmas" Released: November 17, 2016; 2. "I'll Be Home for Christmas" Released: November 17, 2016

Alternative cover
- Cover of the 2017 and 2018 reissues

My Kind of Christmas is the thirtieth studio album and third Christmas album by American country music singer Reba McEntire. It was released on September 2, 2016, by Nash Icon/Rockin' R Records exclusively through Cracker Barrel Old Country Store. McEntire produced the album with her musical director Doug Sisemore. The album was reissued to all retailers, as well as all digital platforms on October 13, 2017, with additional tracks and new cover art. The album was further reissued in October 2018 with one additional bonus track, the CD version of which was exclusive to Walmart stores in North America.

== Release and promotion ==
The album was announced on July 22, 2016. Following the album's exclusive release at Cracker Barrel stores on September 2, "Hard Candy Christmas" and "I'll Be Home for Christmas" were both issued as singles on November 17.

The album was reissued to all retailers, as well as digital platforms in 2017, featuring new artwork and four additional tracks and replaced her solo version of "Silent Night" with her 2013 version featuring Kelly Clarkson and Trisha Yearwood which was previously included as the ending track on Clarkson's Wrapped in Red album in 2013. To promote the album's wide retail release, McEntire hosted the annual CMA Country Christmas special on November 27.

The album was reissued a second time in 2018. This edition of the album features the same artwork and track listing as the 2017 reissue, with the addition of one new track. It was made available to all digital platforms and the CD version was sold exclusively through Walmart stores. On December 10, McEntire hosted the CMA Country Christmas special for the second year in a row.

== Commercial performance ==
The album debuted at No. 27 on the Billboard Top Country Albums chart dated September 17, 2016, with 2,100 copies sold. The album peaked at No. 1 on the Billboard Top Holiday Albums chart for the week ending October 22. The album saw further chart success when it was reissued in 2017. It reached its peak position of No. 7 on the Billboard Top Country Albums chart dated December 16, 2017. The album also peaked at No. 39 on the Billboard 200 chart dated December 30. In Canada, the album peaked at No. 62 on the Canadian Albums chart dated December 30, 2017. The album has sold 58,900 copies in the United States as of November 2017.

== Track listing ==
2016 release (Cracker Barrel exclusive)
| No. | Title | Writer(s) | Length |
|---|---|---|---|
| 1. | "Winter Wonderland" | Felix Bernard; Richard B. Smith | 2:07 |
| 2. | "The Christmas Song (Chestnuts Roasting on an Open Fire)" | Robert Wells; Mel Tormé | 3:26 |
| 3. | "Santa Claus Is Coming to Town" | John Frederick Coots; Haven Gillespie | 2:10 |
| 4. | "O Holy Night" | Placide Cappeau; Adolphe Adam | 3:39 |
| 5. | "Hard Candy Christmas" | Carol Hall | 3:50 |
| 6. | "O Come All Ye Faithful" | Frederick Oakeley; John Francis Wade | 2:58 |
| 7. | "Jingle Bell Rock" | Joe Beal; Jim Boothe | 1:52 |
| 8. | "Silent Night" | Franz Gruber; Joseph Mohr | 3:18 |
| 9. | "White Christmas" | Irving Berlin | 3:15 |
| 10. | "Jingle Bells" | James Lord Pierpont | 1:43 |
| 11. | "I'll Be Home for Christmas" | Kim Gannon; Walter Kent; Buck Ram | 3:47 |
| Total length: | | | 32:06 |

2017 reissue
| No. | Title | Writer(s) | Length |
|---|---|---|---|
| 1. | "Winter Wonderland" | Felix Bernard; Richard B. Smith | 2:04 |
| 2. | "The Christmas Song (Chestnuts Roasting on an Open Fire)" | Robert Wells; Mel Tormé | 3:23 |
| 3. | "Mary, Did You Know?" (with Vince Gill & Amy Grant) | Mark Lowry; Buddy Greene | 4:45 |
| 4. | "Jingle Bell Rock" | Joe Beal; Jim Boothe | 1:50 |
| 5. | "O Holy Night" | Placide Cappeau; Adolphe Adam | 3:37 |
| 6. | "Hard Candy Christmas" | Carol Hall | 3:48 |
| 7. | "Back to God" (with Lauren Daigle) | Randy Houser; Dallas Davidson | 4:55 |
| 8. | "Santa Claus Is Coming to Town" | John Frederick Coots; Haven Gillespie | 2:08 |
| 9. | "O Come All Ye Faithful" | Frederick Oakeley; John Francis Wade | 2:55 |
| 10. | "O Little Town of Bethlehem" (with Darius Rucker) | Phillips Brooks; Lewis Redner | 3:55 |
| 11. | "White Christmas" | Irving Berlin | 3:13 |
| 12. | "Jingle Bells" | James Lord Pierpont | 1:40 |
| 13. | "I'll Be Home for Christmas" | Kim Gannon; Walter Kent; Buck Ram | 3:46 |
| 14. | "Silent Night" (with Kelly Clarkson and Trisha Yearwood) | Franz Gruber; Joseph Mohr | 4:07 |
| Total length: | | | 46:06 |

2018 reissue bonus track
| No. | Title | Writer(s) | Length |
|---|---|---|---|
| 15. | "What Child Is This" (with The Isaacs) | William Chatterton Dix | 3:18 |
| Total length: | | | 49:24 |

== Personnel ==
Adapted from the original 2016 release liner notes.

- Chris Ashburn – recording assistant
- Brett Freedman – hair, makeup
- Terry Gordon – wardrobe
- Taylor Colson Horton – art direction
- Laurel Kittleson – production coordinator
- Nick Lane – mixing assistant
- Catherine Marx – piano, arrangements (tracks 4, 6, 8, 10)
- Reba McEntire – girl singer, producer, arrangements (tracks 4, 6, 8, 10), liner notes
- Justin McIntosh – art direction, graphic design
- Cameron Powell – photographer, art direction
- Doug Sisemore – producer, production coordinator
- Janice Soled – production coordinator
- Brianna Steinitz – production coordinator
- Todd Tidwell – recording, mixing

== Charts ==
=== Weekly charts ===
| Chart (2016–2017) | Peak position |
|---|---|
| Canadian Albums (Billboard) | 62 |
| US Billboard 200 | 39 |
| US Top Country Albums (Billboard) | 7 |
| US Top Holiday Albums (Billboard) | 1 |

=== Year-end charts ===
| Chart (2018) | Position |
|---|---|
| US Top Country Albums (Billboard) | 57 |
| Chart (2019) | Position |
| US Top Country Albums (Billboard) | 74 |

== Release history ==
| Country | Date | Format | Label | Edition(s) |
|---|---|---|---|---|
| United States | September 2, 2016 | CD, LP | Cracker Barrel, Nash Icon | Cracker Barrel edition |
| Worldwide | October 13, 2017 | CD, digital download | Rockin’ R Records, Nash Icon | 2017 reissue |
| Worldwide | December 7, 2018 | CD, digital download | Big Machine Records | 2018 reissue |
