= Sing It Now: Songs of Faith & Hope =

Studio album by Reba McEntire
- Released: February 3, 2017
- Studios: Starstruck Studios, The Hot Closet and The Grip Recording Studio (Nashville, Tennessee); Spin Productions (Brentwood, Tennessee); Mix LA (Tarzana, California)
- Genres: Christian country; gospel
- Length: 76:15
- Labels: Rockin' R; Nash Icon; Big Machine; Capitol Christian
- Producers: Jay DeMarcus; Reba McEntire; Doug Sisemore

Reba McEntire chronology
My Kind of Christmas (2016)	Sing It Now: Songs of Faith & Hope (2017)	Stronger Than the Truth (2019)

Singles from Sing It Now: Songs of Faith & Hope
- 1. "Softly and Tenderly" Released: December 16, 2016; 2. "Back to God" Released: January 20, 2017; 3. "God and My Girlfriends" Released: 2017

Sing It Now: Songs of Faith & Hope is the thirty-first studio album by American country music singer Reba McEntire. It was released on February 3, 2017, by Rockin' R Records, Nash Icon, Big Machine Records and Capitol Christian Music Group. McEntire produced the album with her musical director Doug Sisemore and Jay DeMarcus from the musical group Rascal Flatts. The album consists of two discs. The first disc is made up of traditional hymns, while the second disc contains all original songs. McEntire wrote a song on the album "I Got the Lord on My Side" with the help of her mother, Jackie McEntire.

== Background ==
While McEntire is most known for her work in country music, she has stated that she has wanted to do a gospel album since the mid-1980s. She recorded the album in the wake of her divorce from Narvel Blackstock in 2015, which she said led her faith to become stronger.

== Release and promotion ==
McEntire announced the album on December 15, 2016, during a live Facebook chat. During the chat she also announced that to promote the album she would perform a one-night-only show at the Ryman Auditorium on February 15, 2017. Following the announcement, the first single from the album, "Softly and Tenderly", featuring Kelly Clarkson and Trisha Yearwood, was released on December 16, along with the album's pre-order. In the weeks leading up to the album's release, a new song was released each Friday. "Hallelujah, Amen" was released as the first promotional single on December 23. The second promotional single, "Oh, How I Love Jesus", was released on December 30. The third promotional single, "God and My Girlfriends", was released on January 6, 2017. "Oh Happy Day" was released as the fourth promotional single on January 13. The album's second single, "Back to God", was released on January 20. The music video for the single "Back to God" was released on January 24, 2017. The fifth and final promotional single, "Sing It Now", was released on January 27. In November 2017, "God and My Girlfriends" was sent to radio as the third and final single from the album.

== Critical reception ==
Professional ratings
Review scores
Source	Rating
AllMusic	3.5/5 stars
CCM Magazine	5/5 stars

The album received mostly positive reviews from music critics. Stephen Thomas Erlewine for AllMusic said, "All of the ten new songs are very much creatures of their time -- big, glossy productions within the praise and worship mode. In contrast, the ten standards -- while still plenty polished -- are a bit rootsier. Each album is satisfying on its own, but when heard in conjunction, the range and subtle skill of McEntire impress." Andy Argyrakis of CCM Magazine gave to album 5 out of 5 stars, saying, "McEntire co-produces the entire spread alongside Rascal Flatts’ Jay DeMarcus and her band leader/musical director Doug Sisemore, resulting in a sound that straddles southern gospel, classic country, pop and contemporary Christian with a message that boldly lives up to its title on literally every single stirring occasion." My Kind of Country gave the album an A−, praising McEntire's decision to record a gospel album, "Sing It Now shows that when she puts aside commercial considerations and works with good material, she is still second to none." Today's Christian Entertainment gave the album 4.5 out of 5 stars, saying, "Complete with Reba’s signature style and sound, Sing It Now: Songs of Faith & Hope inspires with music that speaks to the hearts of listeners while keeping the attention on the love and grace of our Heavenly Father." Sounds Like Nashville proclaimed that "Sing It Now" made for a perfect segue from the standards to the newer material.

=== Awards and accolades ===
On August 9, 2017, it was announced that Sing It Now: Songs of Faith & Hope would be nominated for a GMA Dove Award for Worship Album of the Year at the 48th Annual GMA Dove Awards.

McEnitre was nominated for the Female Vocalist of the Year Award at the 51st CMA Awards on the strength of the album.

On October 17, 2017, Sing It Now: Songs of Faith & Hope won the GMA Dove Award for Bluegrass/Country/Roots Album of the Year with producers Reba McEntire, Jay DeMarcus and Doug Sisemore being the receipts at a ceremony at Allen Arena in Nashville, Tennessee.

The album also won Best Roots Gospel Album at the 60th Annual Grammy Awards.

== Commercial performance ==
The album debuted at No. 1 on the Top Country Albums chart with 52,000 copies sold in the United States its first week of release. It also debuted at No. 4 on the Billboard 200 based on 54,000 units, which include stream and track sales. It has sold 216,800 copies in the US as of April 2018.

== Track listing ==
Disc one
No.	Title	Writer(s)	Length
1.	"Jesus Loves Me"	William Batchelder Bradbury	2:06
2.	"Oh, How I Love Jesus"	Frederick Whitfield	3:19
3.	"When the Roll Is Called Up Yonder"	James Milton Black	3:29
4.	"Oh Happy Day"	Edwin Hawkins	5:42
5.	"Amazing Grace"	John Newton	3:43
6.	"I'll Fly Away"	Albert E. Brumley	3:07
7.	"In the Garden" / "Wonderful Peace" (featuring The Isaacs)	Austin C. Miles, Warren D. Cornell	4:00
8.	"Swing Low, Sweet Chariot" / "Swing Down Chariot"	Wallace Willis	4:12
9.	"How Great Thou Art"	Carl Boberg	3:39
10.	"Softly and Tenderly" (featuring Kelly Clarkson and Trisha Yearwood)	Will Lamartine Thompson	4:02
Total length:			37:14

Disc two
No.	Title	Writer(s)	Length
1.	"Sing It Now"	Michael Farren, Joseph Habedank, Tony Wood	4:04
2.	"Angels Singin'"	Jessi Alexander, Sarah Buxton, Steve Moakler	3:40
3.	"God and My Girlfriends"	Patricia Conroy, Lisa Hentrich, Marcia Ramirez	3:27
4.	"Hallelujah, Amen"	Dave Barnes, Lucie Silvas, Jeremy Spillman	3:22
5.	"There Is a God"	Chris DuBois, Ashley Gorley	3:57
6.	"I Got the Lord on My Side"	Reba McEntire, Jackie McEntire	3:26
7.	"Back to God"	Randy Houser, Dallas Davidson	4:51
8.	"Angel on My Shoulder"	Leigh Reynolds, Amber White, Philip White	3:50
9.	"From the Inside Out"	Amy Fletcher	4:22
10.	"Say a Prayer" "Jesus Loves Me" (Reprise) (Hidden track)	Michael Dulaney, Jason Sellers, Neil Thrasher; William Batchelder Bradbury	4:07
Total length:			39:01

Deluxe edition bonus tracks
No.	Title	Writer(s)	Length
11.	"I Need to Talk to You"	Linda Davis, Marcus Franklin Johnson, Tim Owens	3:57
12.	"Meanwhile Back at the Cross"	Chip Davis, Doug Johnson, Kim Williams	4:07
Total length:			47:05

== Personnel ==
Musicians

- Reba McEntire – lead vocals
- Gordon Mote – acoustic piano (1, 9, 11–16, 18, 20–22), electric piano (16)
- Doug Sisemore – keyboards (1, 9, 10, 12, 14, 16, 19, 22), organ (5), Hammond B3 organ (8, 10, 13, 14, 16, 17, 22), programming (12, 19)
- Tim Akers – keyboards (2, 4, 7), acoustic piano (10)
- Casey Brown – programming (2)
- Catherine Marx – acoustic piano (3, 8, 17, 19)
- Dave Cohen – keyboards (11, 15, 18, 20, 21)
- Charles Judge – synthesizers (11, 15, 21), strings (11, 15, 21)
- Jim Kimball – acoustic guitar (1, 5, 6, 8, 9, 12–14, 16, 17, 19, 22)
- Jeff King – electric guitar (1, 8, 9, 12–14, 16, 17, 19, 22)
- Jerry McPherson – electric guitar (2, 4, 7, 10)
- Danny Rader – acoustic guitar (2, 4, 7, 10)
- Derek Wells – electric guitar (2, 7, 11, 15, 18, 20, 21)
- Jay DeMarcus – additional guitars (2, 18, 21), additional keyboards (20)
- Rob McNelly – electric guitar (11, 15, 18, 20, 21)
- Ilya Toshinsky – acoustic guitar (11, 15, 18, 20, 21)
- Dan Dugmore – steel guitar (2, 4, 7)
- Mike Johnson – dobro (5, 6, 16), pedalboard (6), steel guitar (8, 13, 14, 17, 19, 22), lap steel guitar (12, 16)
- Travis Toy – steel guitar (11, 15, 20, 21)
- Jimmy Mattingly – mandolin (6, 13), violin (6), fiddle (16)
- Sonya Isaacs – mandolin (7)
- Mark Hill – bass (1, 8, 9, 12–14, 16, 17, 19, 22)
- Joey Canaday – bass (2, 4, 7, 10)
- Jimmie Lee Sloas – bass (11, 15, 18, 20, 21)
- Lonnie Wilson – drums (1, 9, 12–14, 16), programming (12, 14)
- Greg Morrow – drums (2, 4, 7, 10)
- Miles McPherson – drums (8, 11, 15, 17–21)
- Jenee Fleenor – fiddle (2, 7)
- Mark Douthit – saxophones (4, 18)
- Doug Moffett – saxophones (4, 18)
- Barry Green – trombone (4, 18)
- Mike Haynes – trumpet (4, 18)
- Steve Patrick – trumpet (4, 18)

Background vocals

- Tabitha Fair – backing vocals (2, 4, 18)
- Kim Keyes – backing vocals (2, 4, 18)
- Vicki Hampton – backing vocals (2, 4, 5, 8, 12, 14, 16, 18)
- Jim Kimball – backing vocals (3)
- Jimmy Stewart – backing vocals (3, 17)
- Jenifer Wrinkle Thompson – backing vocals (3, 12, 13, 17, 22)
- Bob Bailey – backing vocals (5, 8, 12, 14, 16)
- Wendy Moten – backing vocals (5, 8, 12, 14, 16)
- Alice Foran – backing vocals (6)
- Jackie McEntire – backing vocals (6)
- Reba McEntire – backing vocals (6)
- Susie McEntire – backing vocals (6)
- The Isaacs – backing vocals (7)
- Kelly Clarkson – lead and harmony vocals (10)
- Trisha Yearwood – lead and harmony vocals (10)
- Chip Davis – backing vocals (11, 15, 20, 21)
- Perry Coleman – backing vocals (13, 22)
- Cheri Oakley – backing vocals (20, 21)

Music arrangements

- Reba McEntire – arrangements (1, 3, 5, 6, 8)
- Tim Akers – arrangements (2, 4, 7), horn arrangements (4, 18)
- Jay DeMarcus – arrangements (2, 4, 7)
- Catherine Marx – arrangements (3)
- Doug Sisemore – arrangements (3, 5, 6, 8–10)

== Production ==
- Allison Jones – A&R
- Reba McEntire – producer
- Doug Sisemore – producer (1, 3, 5, 6, 8–10, 12–14, 16, 17, 19, 22), production coordinator (1, 3, 5, 6, 8–10, 12–14, 16, 17, 19, 22)
- Jay DeMarcus – producer (2, 4, 7, 11, 15, 18, 20, 21)
- Mike "Frog" Griffith – production coordinator (2, 4, 7, 11, 15, 18, 20, 21)
- Laurel Kittleson – production coordinator (2, 4, 7, 11, 15, 18, 20, 21)
- Janice Soled – production coordinator (2, 4, 7, 11, 15, 18, 20, 21)
- Brianna Steinitz – production coordinator (2, 4, 7, 11, 15, 18, 20, 21)
- Taylor Colson Horton – art direction
- Justin McIntosh – art direction, graphic design
- Cameron Powell – photography
- Terry Gordon – wardrobe
- Brett Freedman – hair, make-up
- Reba's Business, Inc. – management

Technical credits

- Adam Ayan – mastering at Gateway Mastering (Portland, Maine)
- Todd Tidwell – recording (1, 3, 5, 6, 8–10, 12–14, 16, 17, 19, 22), recording assistant (2, 4, 7, 11, 15, 18, 20, 21)
- Sean Neff – mixing (1, 3, 5, 6, 8–10, 12–14, 16, 17, 19, 22), recording (2, 4, 7, 11, 15, 18, 20, 21)
- Derek Bason – recording (2, 4, 7, 11, 15, 18, 20, 21), mixing (2, 4, 7, 11, 15, 18, 20, 21)
- Jim Kimball – recording (17, 19), mixing (19)
- Chris Lord-Alge – mixing (17)
- Chris Ashburn – recording assistant (1, 3, 5, 6, 8–10, 12–14, 16, 17, 19, 22)
- Nick Lane – mix assistant (1, 3, 5, 6, 8–10, 12–14, 16, 17, 19, 22), recording assistant (2, 4, 7, 11, 15, 18, 20, 21)
- Chris Small – mix assistant (2, 4, 7, 11, 15, 18, 20, 21)

== Charts ==
=== Weekly ===
Chart (2017)	Peak position
Australian Albums (ARIA)	187
Canadian Albums (Billboard)	23
UK Country Albums (Official Charts)	3
US Billboard 200	4
US Christian Albums (Billboard)	1
US Top Country Albums (Billboard)	1

=== Year-end ===
Chart (2017)	Rank
US Billboard 200	196
US Christian Albums (Billboard)	2
US Country Albums (Billboard)	33
