= Grammy Award for Best Contemporary Country Album =

Annual award

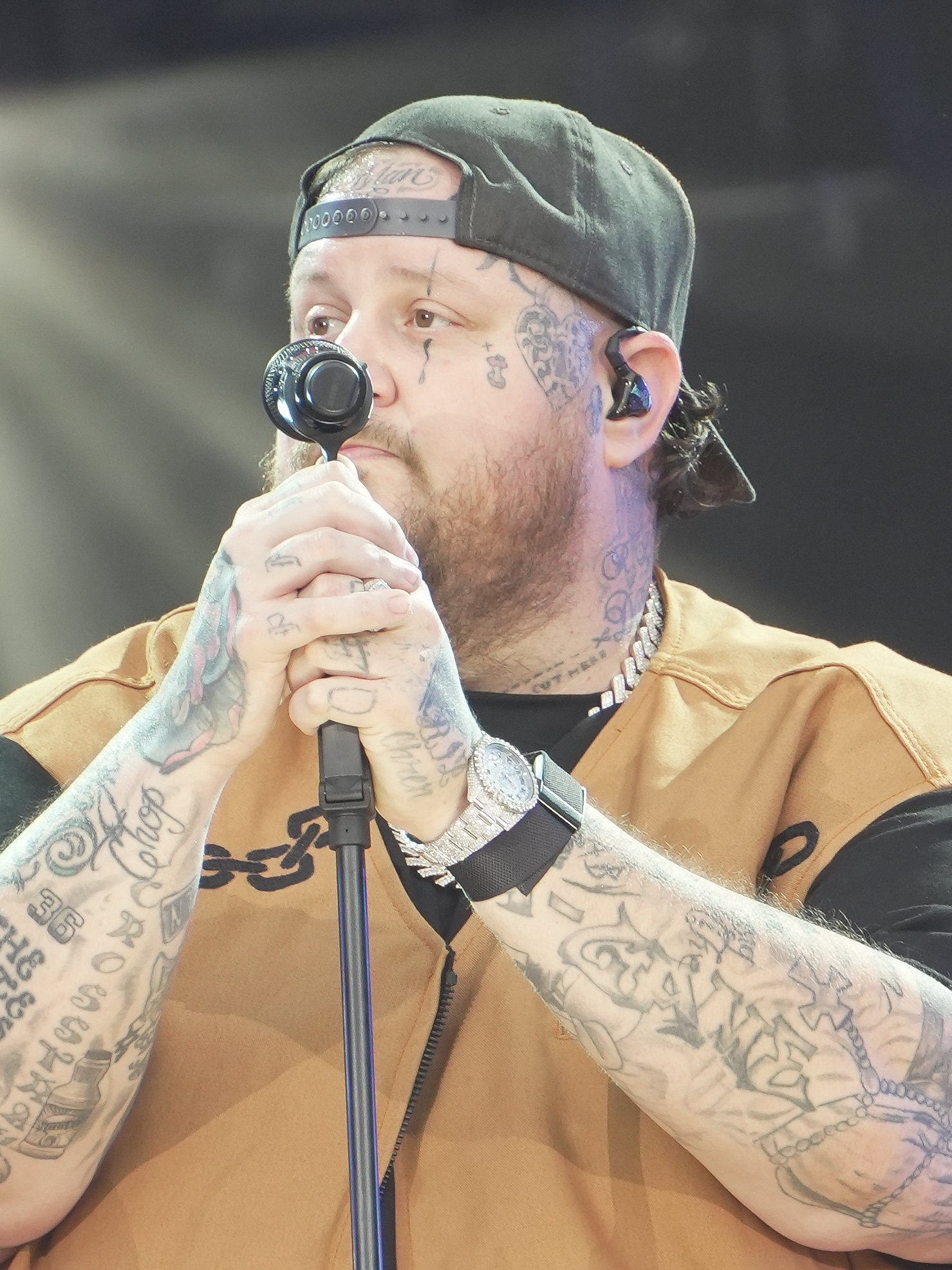
- Beautifully Broken by Jelly Roll is the most recent recipient.
- Awarded for: quality albums in the country music genre
- Country: United States
- Presented by: National Academy of Recording Arts and Sciences
- First award: 1965
- Currently held by: Jelly Roll – Beautifully Broken (2026)
- Website: grammy.com

The Grammy Award for Best Contemporary Country Album is an award presented at the Grammy Awards, a ceremony that was established in 1958 and originally called the Gramophone Awards, to recording artists for quality albums in the country music genre. Honors in several categories are presented at the ceremony annually by the National Academy of Recording Arts and Sciences of the United States to "honor artistic achievement, technical proficiency and overall excellence in the recording industry, without regard to album sales or chart position".

The award was first presented under the name of Best Country & Western Album in 1966 to Roger Miller for Dang Me/Chug-A-Lug and was discontinued the following year. In 1995 the category was revived and was presented as Best Country Album until 2025 before receiving its current denomination at the 68th Annual Grammy Awards in 2026 alongside the debut of a sister category Best Traditional Country Album.

According to the category description guide for the 68th Grammy Awards (2026), the award "recognizes contemporary country music recordings, both vocal and instrumental, which utilize a stylistic intention, song structure, lyrical content, and/or musical presentation to create a sensibility that reflects the broad spectrum of contemporary country style and culture. The intent is to recognize country music that remains reminiscent and relevant to the legacy of country music’s culture, while also engaging in more contemporary music forms."

The Chicks are the most awarded performers in this category with four wins, followed by Chris Stapleton who has three wins. Two-time award winners include Roger Miller, Lady A, Kacey Musgraves and Miranda Lambert. Canadian singer Shania Twain is the only non-American winner in this category, to date. Trisha Yearwood holds the record for most nominations, with eight. Yearwood also holds the record for most nominations without a win. The current holder of the award is Jelly Roll, who won at the 68th Grammy Awards with his tenth studio album, Beautifully Broken.

== Recipients ==
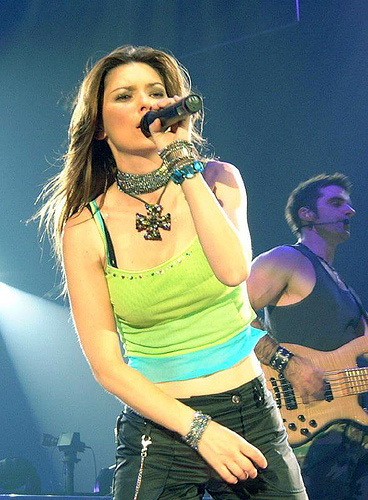
1996 winner and three-time nominee Shania Twain is the first and so far only non-American winner.

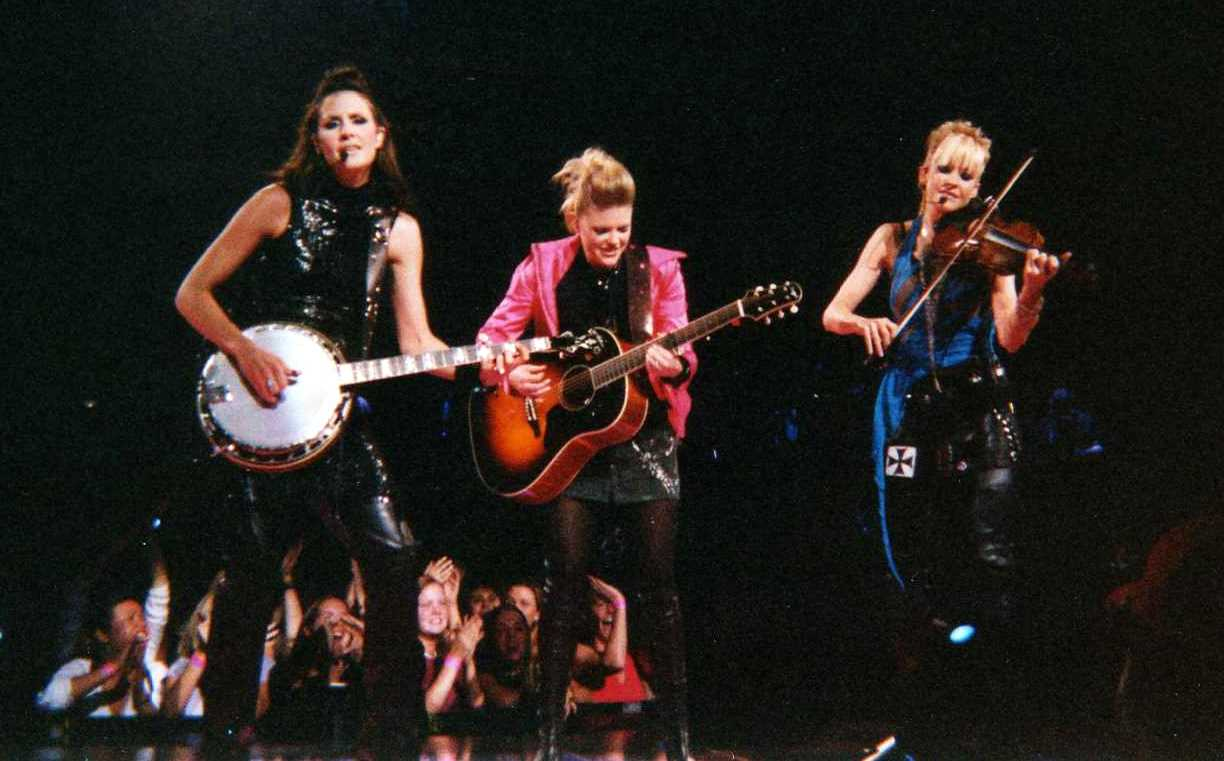
Dixie Chicks the most awarded performers with four wins.

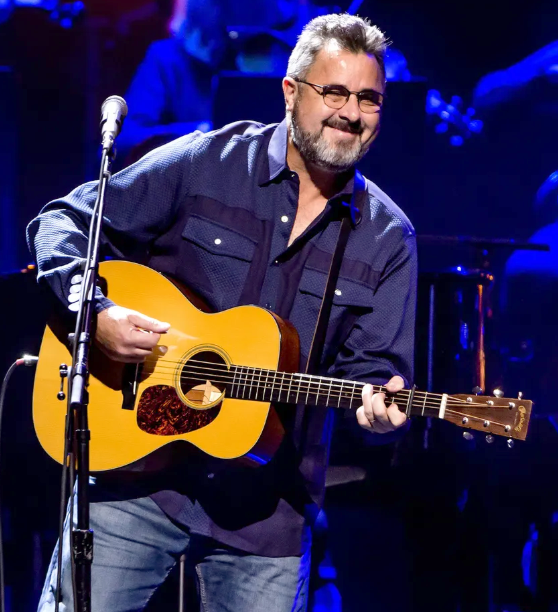
Vince Gill received the award in 2008 as has eight additional nominations in this category. He is, to date, the most awarded male country artist at the Grammys.

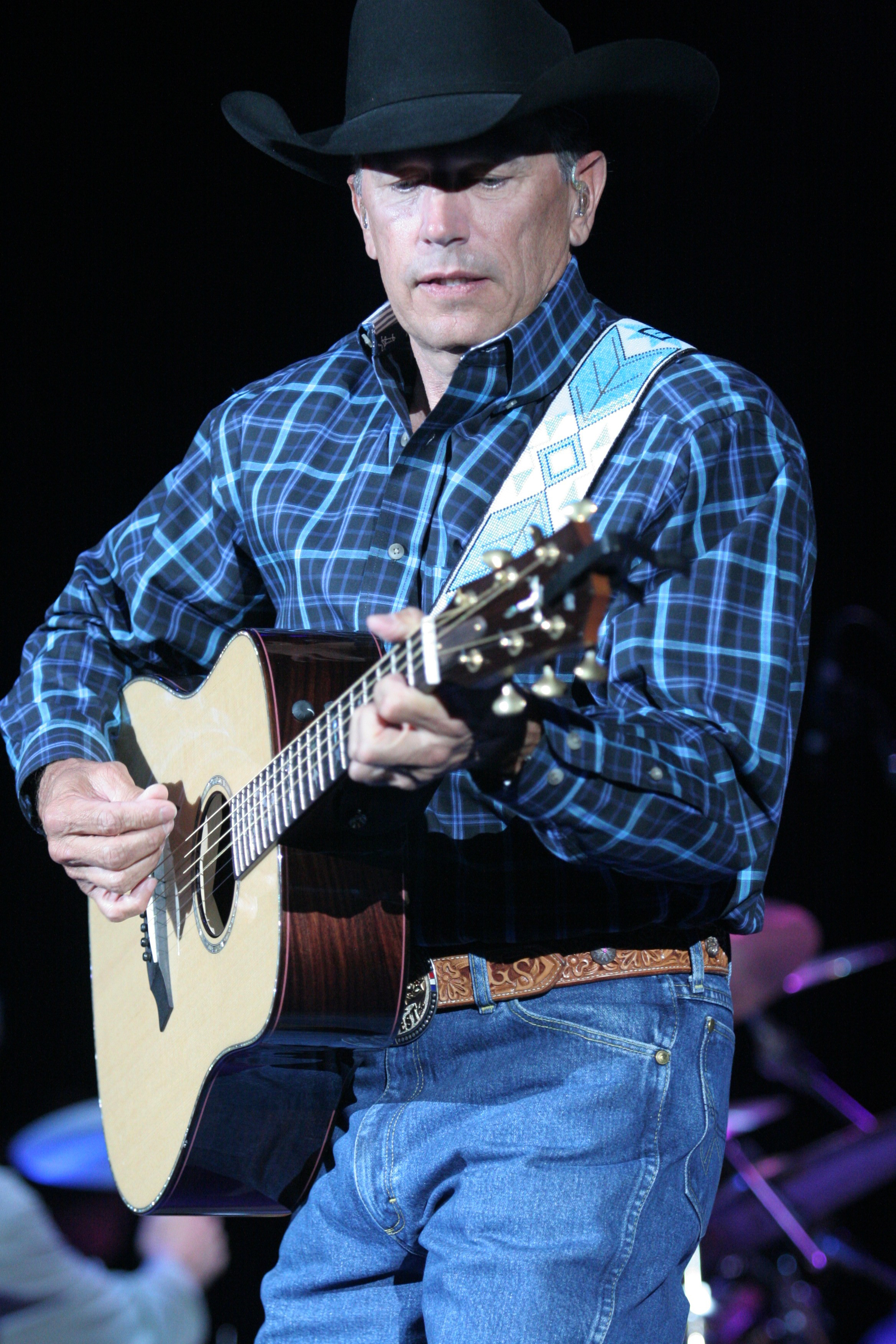
2009 winner George Strait

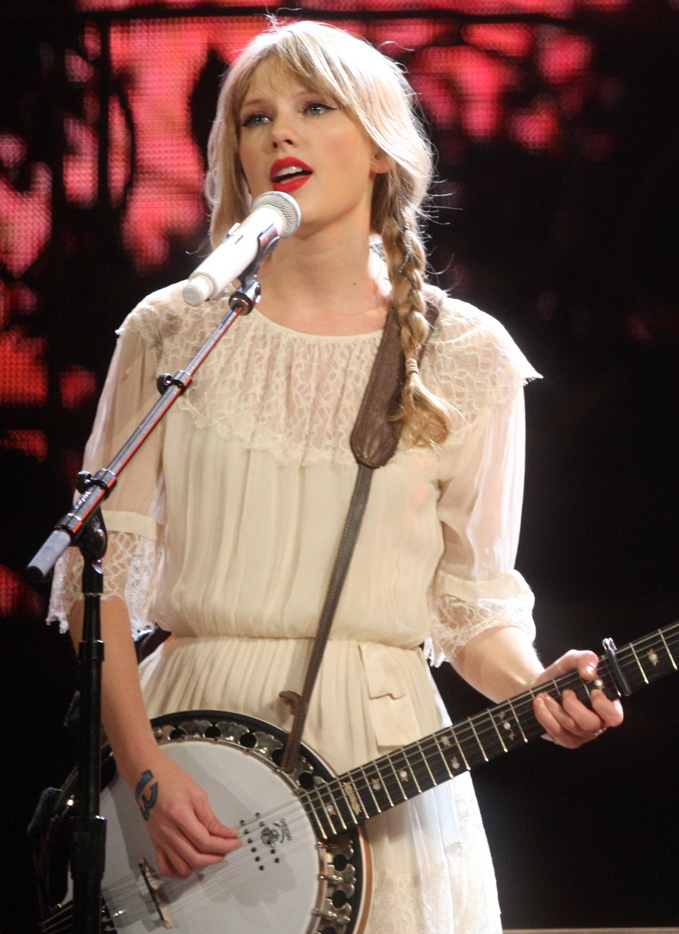
Taylor Swift received three nominations in this category. Her album, Fearless won, including Album of the Year in 2010.

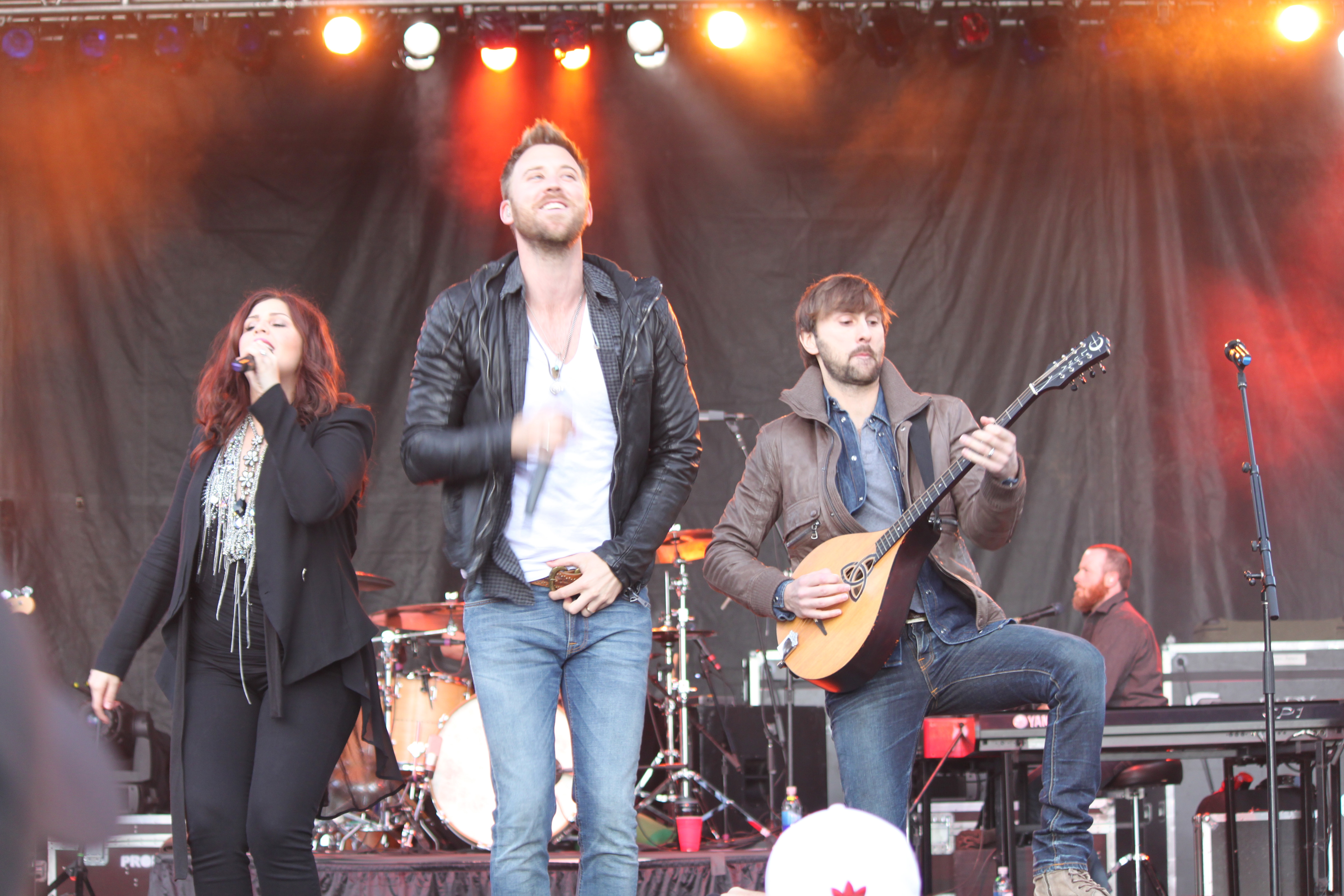
Lady Antebellum, three-time nominees and 2011 and 2012 winners

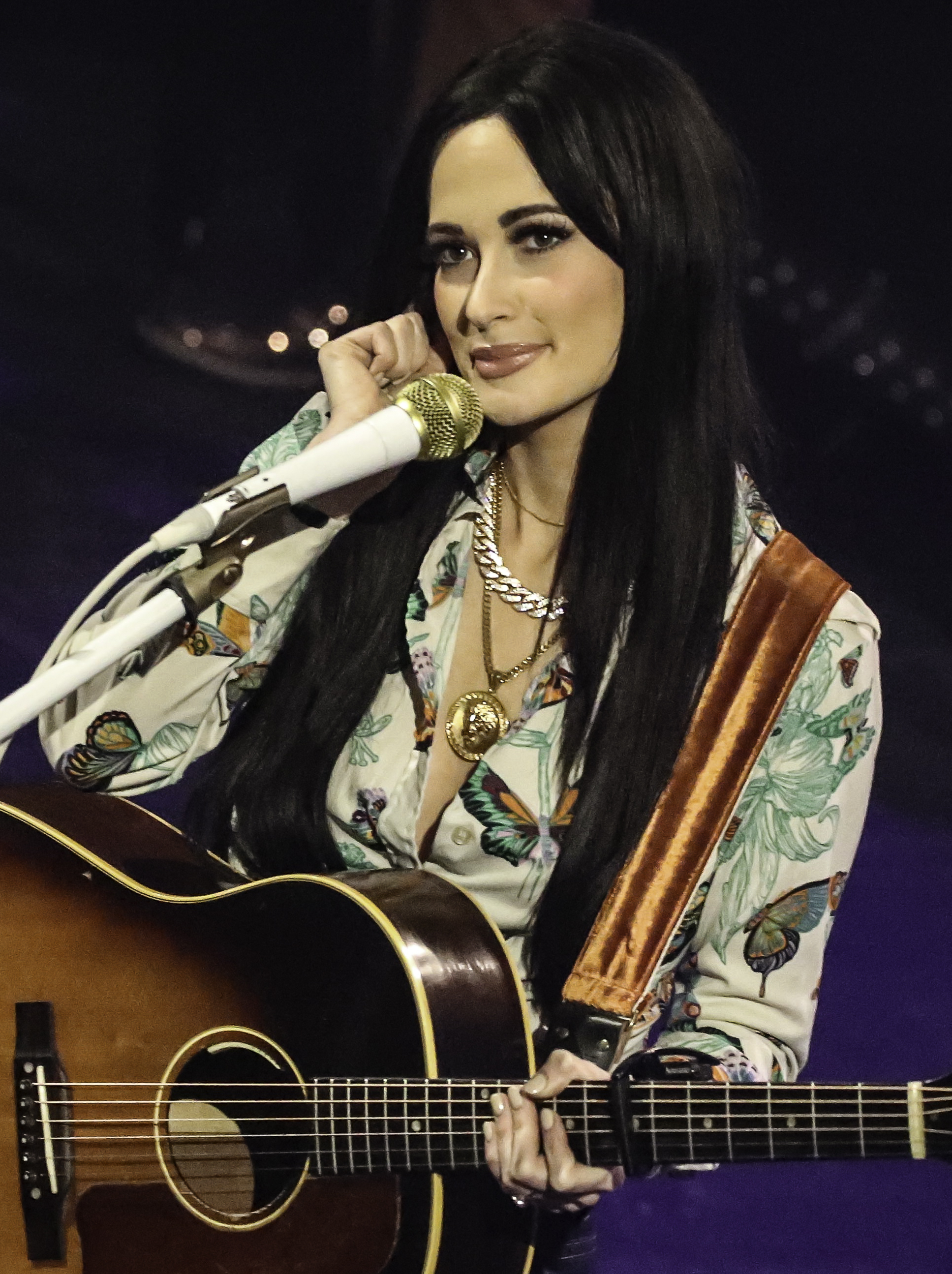
Two-time winner Kacey Musgraves. Her album Golden Hour has also won Album of the Year in 2019.

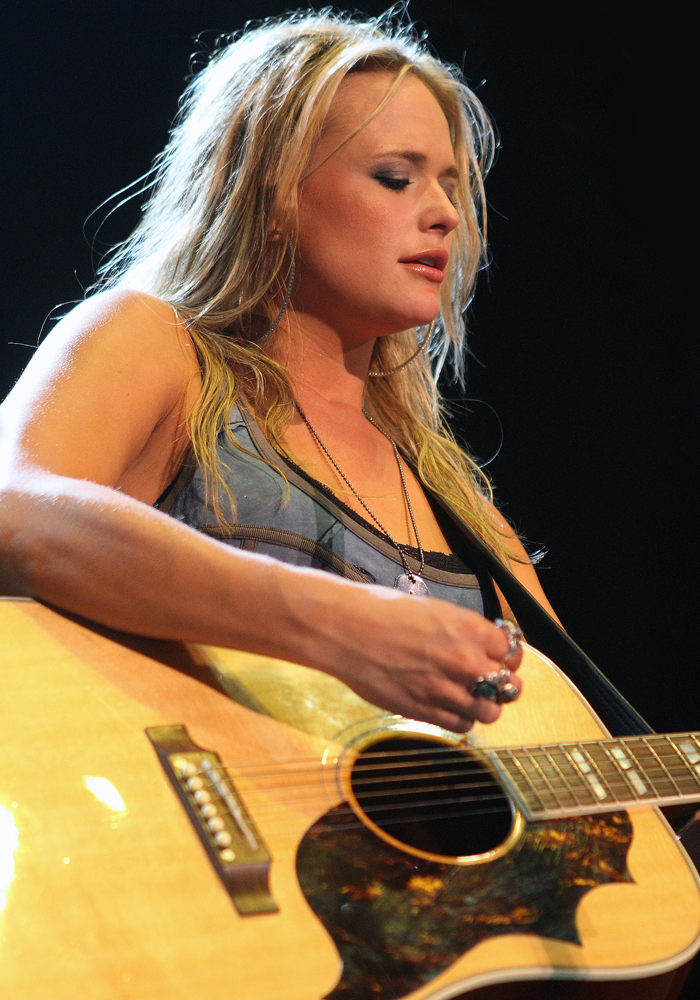
Two-time recipient Miranda Lambert

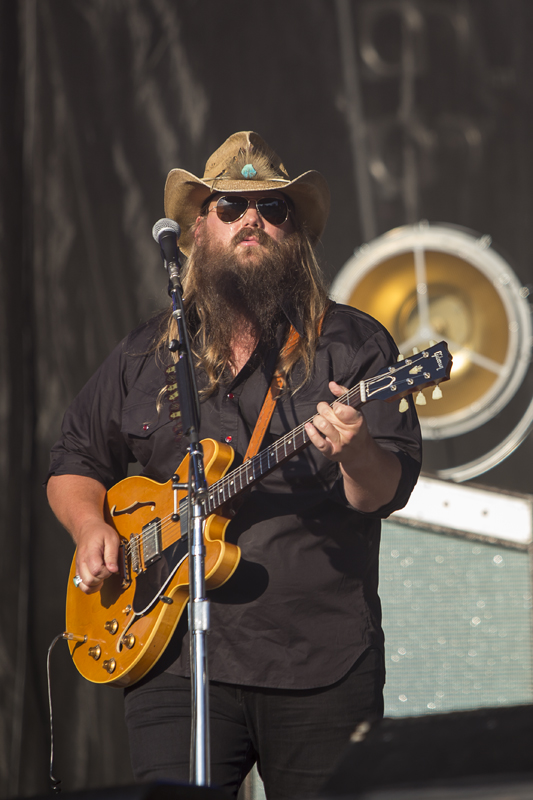
Three-time winner Chris Stapleton

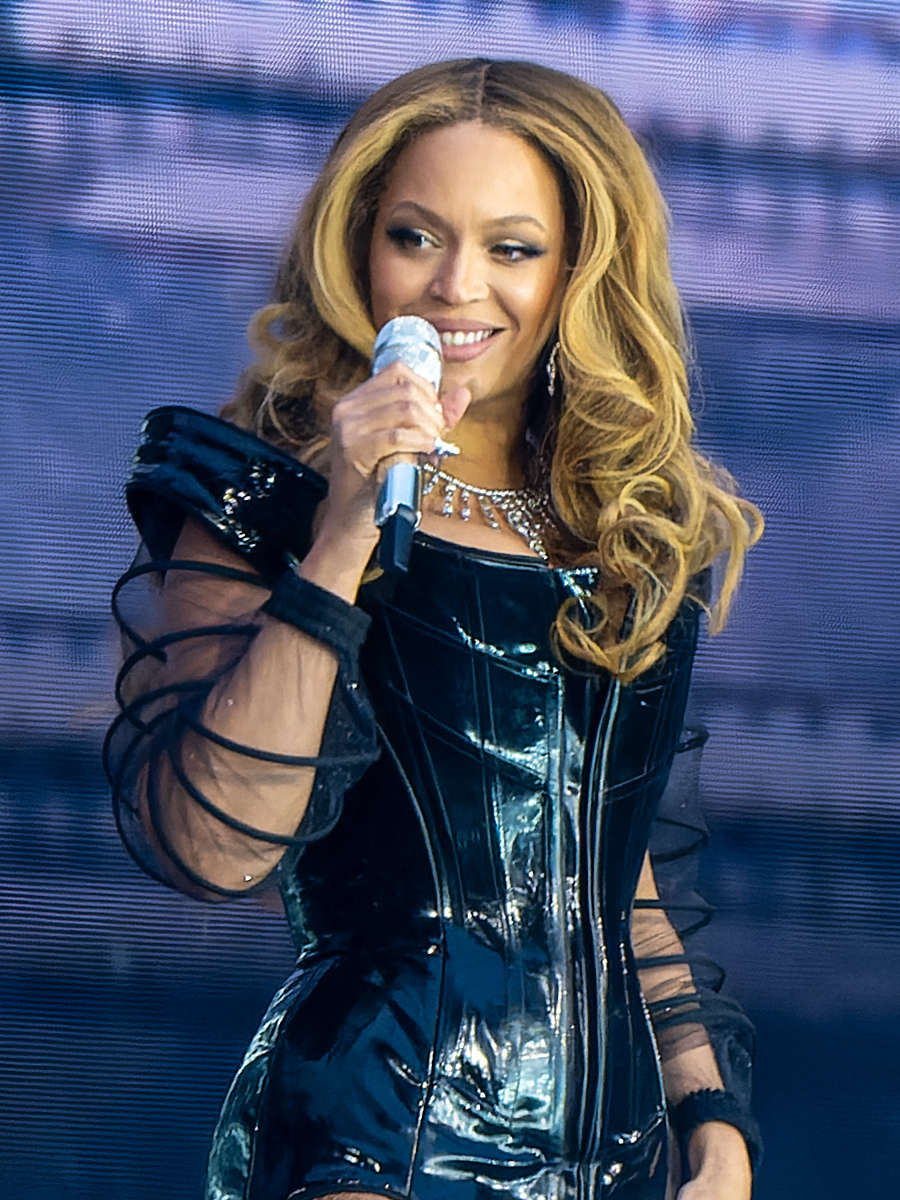
Beyoncé is the first black artist to win the award. Her album, Cowboy Carter also won Album of the Year in 2025.

=== 1960s ===
Year	Work	Artist
1965
1965	Dang Me/Chug-a-Lug	Roger Miller
1965	The Best of Buck Owens	Buck Owens
1965	The Best of Jim Reeves	Jim Reeves
1965	Bitter Tears: Ballads of the American Indian	Johnny Cash
1965	Guitar Country	Chet Atkins
1965	Hank Williams Jr. Sings the Songs of Hank Williams	Hank Williams Jr.
1966
1966	The Return of Roger Miller	Roger Miller
1966	Father and Son: Hank Williams and Hank Williams Jr.	Hank Williams and Hank Williams Jr.
1966	The Jim Reeves Way	Jim Reeves
1966	More of That Guitar Country	Chet Atkins
1966	My World	Eddy Arnold

=== 1990s ===
Year	Work	Artist
1995
1995	Stones in the Road	Mary Chapin Carpenter
1995	Read My Mind	Reba McEntire
1995	The Song Remembers When	Trisha Yearwood
1995	Tribute to the Music of Bob Wills and the Texas Playboys	Asleep at the Wheel
1995	When Love Finds You	Vince Gill
1996
1996	The Woman in Me	Shania Twain
1996	Dwight Live	Dwight Yoakam
1996	John Michael Montgomery	John Michael Montgomery
1996	Junior High	Junior Brown
1996	Music for All Occasions	The Mavericks
1996	Thinkin' About You	Trisha Yearwood
1997
1997	The Road to Ensenada	Lyle Lovett
1997	Borderline	Brooks & Dunn
1997	Everybody Knows	Trisha Yearwood
1997	Gone	Dwight Yoakam
1997	High Lonesome Sound	Vince Gill
1997	The Trouble with the Truth	Patty Loveless
1998
1998	Unchained	Johnny Cash
1998	Carrying Your Love with Me	George Strait
1998	Everything I Love	Alan Jackson
1998	Long Stretch of Lonesome	Patty Loveless
1998	Under the Covers	Dwight Yoakam
1999
1999	Wide Open Spaces	The Chicks
1999	Come On Over	Shania Twain
1999	Faith	Faith Hill
1999	Sevens	Garth Brooks
1999	Where Your Road Leads	Trisha Yearwood

=== 2000s ===
Year	Work	Artist
2000
2000	Fly	The Chicks
2000	Cold Hard Truth	George Jones
2000	Forget About It	Alison Krauss
2000	Ride with Bob: A Tribute to Bob Wills and the Texas Playboys	Asleep at the Wheel
2000	Trio II	Emmylou Harris, Linda Ronstadt and Dolly Parton
2001
2001	Breathe	Faith Hill
2001	I Hope You Dance	Lee Ann Womack
2001	Let's Make Sure We Kiss Goodbye	Vince Gill
2001	Real Live Woman	Trisha Yearwood
2001	Under the Influence	Alan Jackson
2002
2002	Timeless: Hank Williams Tribute	Various Artists
2002	Inside Out	Trisha Yearwood
2002	One More Day	Diamond Rio
2002	Rainbow Connection	Willie Nelson
2002	Set This Circus Down	Tim McGraw
2003
2003	Home	The Chicks
2003	Drive	Alan Jackson
2003	The Great Divide	Willie Nelson
2003	Halos & Horns	Dolly Parton
2003	Man with a Memory	Joe Nichols
2004
2004	Livin', Lovin', Losin': Songs of the Louvin Brothers	Various Artists
2004	Cry	Faith Hill
2004	Live and Kickin'	Willie Nelson
2004	My Baby Don't Tolerate	Lyle Lovett
2004	Run That by Me One More Time	Willie Nelson and Ray Price
2004	Up!	Shania Twain
2005
2005	Van Lear Rose	Loretta Lynn
2005	Be Here	Keith Urban
2005	Here for the Party	Gretchen Wilson
2005	Live Like You Were Dying	Tim McGraw
2005	Tambourine	Tiff Merritt
2006
2006	Lonely Runs Both Ways	Alison Krauss & Union Station
2006	All Jacked Up	Gretchen Wilson
2006	Fireflies	Faith Hill
2006	Jasper County	Trisha Yearwood
2006	Time Well Wasted	Brad Paisley
2007
2007	Taking the Long Way	The Chicks
2007	Like Red on a Rose	Alan Jackson
2007	The Road to Here	Little Big Town
2007	You Don't Know Me: The Songs of Cindy Walker	Willie Nelson
2007	Your Man	Josh Turner
2008
2008	These Days	Vince Gill
2008	5th Gear	Brad Paisley
2008	It Just Comes Natural	George Strait
2008	Let It Go	Tim McGraw
2008	Long Trip Alone	Dierks Bentley
2009
2009	Troubadour	George Strait
2009	Around the Bend	Randy Travis
2009	Heaven, Heartache and the Power of Love	Trisha Yearwood
2009	Sleepless Nights	Patty Loveless
2009	That Lonesome Song	Jamey Johnson

=== 2010s ===
Year	Work	Artist
2010
2010	Fearless	Taylor Swift
2010	Call Me Crazy	Lee Ann Womack
2010	Defying Gravity	Keith Urban
2010	The Foundation	Zac Brown Band
2010	Twang	George Strait
2011
2011	Need You Now	Lady Antebellum
2011	The Guitar Song	Jamey Johnson
2011	Revolution	Miranda Lambert
2011	Up on the Ridge	Dierks Bentley
2011	You Get What You Give	Zac Brown Band
2012
2012	Own the Night	Lady Antebellum
2012	Chief	Eric Church
2012	Here for a Good Time	George Strait
2012	My Kinda Party	Jason Aldean
2012	Red River Blue	Blake Shelton
2012	Speak Now	Taylor Swift
2013
2013	Uncaged	Zac Brown Band
2013	Four the Record	Miranda Lambert
2013	Hunter Hayes	Hunter Hayes
2013	Living for a Song: A Tribute to Hank Cochran	Jamey Johnson
2013	The Time Jumpers	The Time Jumpers
2014
2014	Same Trailer Different Park	Kacey Musgraves
2014	Based on a True Story...	Blake Shelton
2014	Night Train	Jason Aldean
2014	Red	Taylor Swift
2014	Two Lanes of Freedom	Tim McGraw
2015
2015	Platinum	Miranda Lambert
2015	The Outsiders	Eric Church
2015	Riser	Dierks Bentley
2015	12 Stories	Brandy Clark
2015	The Way I'm Livin'	Lee Ann Womack
2016
2016	Traveller	Chris Stapleton
2016	The Blade	Ashley Monroe
2016	Montevallo	Sam Hunt
2016	Pageant Material	Kacey Musgraves
2016	Pain Killer	Little Big Town
2017
2017	A Sailor's Guide to Earth	Sturgill Simpson
2017	Big Day in a Small Town	Brandy Clark
2017	Full Circle	Loretta Lynn
2017	Hero	Maren Morris
2017	Ripcord	Keith Urban
2018
2018	From A Room: Volume 1	Chris Stapleton
2018	The Breaker	Little Big Town
2018	Cosmic Hallelujah	Kenny Chesney
2018	Heart Break	Lady Antebellum
2018	Life Changes	Thomas Rhett
2019
2019	Golden Hour	Kacey Musgraves
2019	From A Room: Volume 2	Chris Stapleton
2019	Girl Going Nowhere	Ashley McBryde
2019	Port Saint Joe	Brothers Osborne
2019	Unapologetically	Kelsea Ballerini

=== 2020s ===
Year	Work	Artist
2020
2020	While I'm Livin'	Tanya Tucker
2020	Center Point Road	Thomas Rhett
2020	Desperate Man	Eric Church
2020	Interstate Gospel	Pistol Annies
2020	Stronger Than the Truth	Reba McEntire
2021
2021	Wildcard	Miranda Lambert
2021	Lady Like	Ingrid Andress
2021	Never Will	Ashley McBryde
2021	Nightfall	Little Big Town
2021	Your Life Is a Record	Brandy Clark
2022
2022	Starting Over	Chris Stapleton
2022	The Ballad of Dood and Juanita	Sturgill Simpson
2022	The Marfa Tapes	Miranda Lambert, Jon Randall and Jack Ingram
2022	Remember Her Name	Mickey Guyton
2022	Skeletons	Brothers Osborne
2023
2023	A Beautiful Time	Willie Nelson
2023	Ashley McBryde Presents: Lindeville	Ashley McBryde
2023	Growin' Up	Luke Combs
2023	Humble Quest	Maren Morris
2023	Palomino	Miranda Lambert
2024
2024	Bell Bottom Country	Lainey Wilson
2024	Brothers Osborne	Brothers Osborne
2024	Rolling Up the Welcome Mat	Kelsea Ballerini
2024	Rustin' in the Rain	Tyler Childers
2024	Zach Bryan	Zach Bryan
2025
2025	Cowboy Carter	Beyoncé
2025	Deeper Well	Kacey Musgraves
2025	F-1 Trillion	Post Malone
2025	Higher	Chris Stapleton
2025	Whirlwind	Lainey Wilson
2026
2026	Beautifully Broken	Jelly Roll
2026	Evangeline vs. the Machine	Eric Church
2026	Patterns	Kelsea Ballerini
2026	Postcards from Texas	Miranda Lambert
2026	Snipe Hunter	Tyler Childers
2027	Cherry Valley	Carter Faith
2027	Cloud 9	Megan Moroney
2027	Dandelion	Ella Langley
2027	Middle of Nowhere	Kacey Musgraves
2027	Mount Pleasant	Kelsea Ballerini

^{^[I]} Each year is linked to the article about the Grammy Awards held that year.

== Artists with multiple wins ==
4 wins

- The Chicks

3 wins

- Chris Stapleton

2 wins

- Lady Antebellum
- Miranda Lambert
- Kacey Musgraves
- Roger Miller

== Artists with multiple nominations ==
8 nominations

- Miranda Lambert (1 with Pistol Annies)
- Trisha Yearwood

6 nominations

- Willie Nelson

5 nominations

- Kacey Musgraves
- Chris Stapleton
- George Strait

4 nominations

- Kelsea Ballerini
- The Chicks
- Eric Church
- Vince Gill
- Faith Hill
- Alan Jackson
- Little Big Town
- Tim McGraw

3 nominations

- Dierks Bentley
- Zac Brown Band
- Brandy Clark
- Jamey Johnson
- Lady Antebellum
- Patty Loveless
- Ashley McBryde
- Taylor Swift
- Shania Twain
- Keith Urban
- Lee Ann Womack
- Dwight Yoakam

2 nominations

- Jason Aldean
- Asleep at the Wheel
- Chet Atkins
- Brothers Osborne
- Johnny Cash
- Tyler Childers
- Alison Krauss
- Lyle Lovett
- Loretta Lynn
- Reba McEntire
- Roger Miller
- Ashley Monroe (1 with Pistol Annies)
- Maren Morris
- Brad Paisley
- Dolly Parton
- Jim Reeves
- Thomas Rhett
- Blake Shelton
- Sturgill Simpson
- Hank Williams Jr.
- Gretchen Wilson
- Lainey Wilson

== See also ==
- Grammy Award for Album of the Year
