= Brandy Clark (album) =

Studio album by Brandy Clark
- Released: May 19, 2023
- Studios: Shangri-La Studio, Malibu, California
- Genres: Americana, country
- Length: 38:46
- Label: Warner
- Producer: Brandi Carlile

Brandy Clark chronology
Your Life Is a Record (2020)	Brandy Clark (2023)

Singles from Brandy Clark
- 1. "Buried" Released: March 24, 2023; 2. "Dear Insecurity" Released: June 5, 2023

Brandy Clark is the fourth studio album by American country music artist Brandy Clark. It was released on May 19, 2023, by Warner Records and follows her 2020 album Your Life Is a Record. Produced by fellow artist Brandi Carlile, whom Clark previously collaborated on the 2020 single "Same Devil", the project contains eleven tracks.

== Background ==
The album was announced on March 24, 2023, alongside the release of the lead single, "Buried". In a statement accompanying the announcement, Clark explained "this album is a return home to me in many ways. Musically it's the rawest I've been since 12 Stories and maybe even rawer. When Brandi and I sat down and talked about working together, one thing that really intrigued me was her saying 'I see it as your return to the Northwest.' That comment inspired so much for me. It took me back to where and how I grew up. 'Northwest' and 'She Smoked In The House' were both a result of that early conversation." On the decision to work with Carlile as opposed to re-teaming with Jay Joyce who produced her previous two albums, Clark expressed that "working with another recording artist on this project was such a gift that I didn't even know I needed and changed the way I want to write songs and make records moving forward. My hope is that anyone who hears this album will feel the heart that I put into every note of it."

Regarding the sonic composition of the project, Carlile explained "Brandy is one of the greatest songwriters I've ever known. And I feel like I now know exactly who Brandy Clark is through the portal of this singular brilliantly written album. When I heard the songs for this album, they took me back to the first time I heard Car Wheels on a Gravel Road. I was thinking about Tom Petty, The Pretenders, Kim Richey, Sheryl Crow, Shelby Lynne and the soul of '90s Americana before it had a name. This is the time Brandy has chosen to reveal herself to the world as an artist and a woman and I was blessed beyond measure to be the person she trusted to support and facilitate that swan dive." She also praised Clarks artistry, stating "Brandy's voice is like a friend you've had your whole life the second you hear it. I know I'm not alone in feeling this way. This is her moment. This is the one. Sometimes an artist only gets one shot at an album like this in their life."

"Come Back to Me", which Clark co-wrote with Shane McAnally and Trevor Rosen, previously appeared on Keith Urban's 2013 album Fuse.

== Reception ==
Professional ratings
Aggregate scores
Source	Rating
Metacritic	77/100
Review scores
Source	Rating
AllMusic	4.5/5 stars

According to the review aggregator Metacritic, Brandy Clark received "generally favorable reviews" based on a weighted average score of 76 out of 100 from six critic scores. Album of the Year rates the consensus at 73 with six reviews.

Reviewing the album for AllMusic, Stephen Thomas Erlewine described the music as, "empathetic to the point it can seem almost invisible, letting Clark relax and sigh as she acknowledges insecurities and tells tales of heartbreak, steering away from both the clever wit and story songs that helped build her reputation." and declared, "It's not a break so much as a shift in focus: Clark's steady lyrical hand and clear voice are placed at the forefront, conveying a sense of quiet strength that seems to call out for the kind of unvarnished production that Carlile provides."

== Awards ==
Brandy Clark was nominated for five 2024 Grammys related to the album, including Best Americana Album.[17] For "Dear Insecurity," Clark was nominated for Best Americana Performance and Best American Roots Song. For "Buried," she received Grammy nominations for Best Country Song and Best Country Solo Performance. Clark and her collaborator, Brandi Carlile, won the Grammy for Best Americana Performance for "Dear Insecurity." This was Clark's first Grammy win, after also having been nominated for Grammy awards 10 times from 2014 through 2022. In accepting the award, Clark was join onstage by Brandi Carlile.

Clark was also nominated in 2024 for Gold Derby Awards and GLAAD Media Awards.

== Track list ==
Brandy Clark track listing
No.	Title	Writer(s)	Length
1.	"Ain't Enough Rocks" (featuring Derek Trucks)	Brandy Clark; Jessie Jo Dillon; Jimmy Robbins	3:11
2.	"Buried"	Clark; Dillon	3:05
3.	"Tell Her You Don't Love Her" (featuring Lucius)	Clark; Landon Pigg; Emily Weisband	3:32
4.	"Dear Insecurity" (featuring Brandi Carlile)	Clark; Michael Pollack	4:36
5.	"Come Back to Me"	Clark; Shane McAnally; Trevor Rosen	3:19
6.	"Northwest"	Clark; Dillon	4:45
7.	"She Smoked in the House"	Clark	2:28
8.	"Up Above the Clouds (Cecelia's song)"	Clark; Dillon; Robbins	3:00
9.	"All Over Again"	Clark; Pollack	3:13
10.	"Best Ones"	Clark; Benjy Davis; Dillon	4:01
11.	"Take Mine"	Clark; Lucie Silvas; Jeff Trott	3:36
Total length:			38:46

== Personnel ==
- Brandy Clark – vocals, production
- Jay Carlile – backing vocals, harmonica
- Matt Chamberlain – drums
- Brandy Clark – vocals, guitar
- Steve Fishell – pedal steel
- Jedd Hughes – guitar
- Kyleen King – viola
- Lucius – vocals
- Josh Neumann – cello
- Dave Palmer – piano
- Chauntee Ross – violin
- Monique Ross – cello
- Sebastian Steinberg – bass
- Derek Trucks – guitar

== Charts ==
Chart peaks for Brandy Clark
Chart (2020)	Peak
Scottish Albums (Official Charts)	86
UK Americana Albums (Official Charts)	7
UK Country Albums (Official Charts)	3
