= Softly and Tenderly =

Christian hymn written and composed by Will Lamartine Thompson

- by Will Lamartine Thompson
- Genre: Hymn
- Written: 1880
- Based on: Matthew 11:28
- Meter: 11.7.11.7 with refrain

SoftlyAndTenderly

"Softly and Tenderly" is a Christian hymn. It was composed and written by Will L. Thompson in 1880. It is based on the Bible verse Mark 10:49.

Dwight L. Moody used "Softly and Tenderly" in many of his evangelistic rallies in America and Britain. When he was in the hospital and barred from seeing visitors, Thompson had arrived to see him; Moody insisted that Thompson be let in and told him:

Will, I would rather have written "Softly and Tenderly Jesus Is Calling" than anything I have been able to do in my whole life.

Thompson was a member of the Churches of Christ, where several of his hymns and gospel songs continue in use. "Softly and Tenderly" is the most widely known of his compositions and has circulated far beyond its origins in the American Restoration Movement. It is among the most prolifically translated gospel songs and is used throughout many denominations of Christianity.

The hymn was sung at the funeral of activist Martin Luther King Jr..

== Selected recordings ==
- The Andrews Sisters - recorded on February 2, 1950 for Decca Records.

"Softly and Tenderly"

Single by Reba McEntire with Kelly Clarkson and Trisha Yearwood

from the album Sing It Now: Songs of Faith & Hope
- Released: December 16, 2016
- Genre: Christian country
- Length: 4:02
- Label: Rockin' R; Nash Icon; Big Machine; Capitol Christian
- Songwriter: Will Lamartine Thompson
- Producers: Jay DeMarcus; Reba McEntire; Doug Sisemore

Reba McEntire singles chronology
"Just Like Them Horses" (2016)	"Softly and Tenderly" (2016)	"Back to God" (2017)

- The Million Dollar Quartet recorded the song in 1956.
- Pat Boone - included in his album Hymns We Love (1957).
- Rosemary Clooney - for her album Hymns from the Heart (1958).
- Daniel Johnston - for his album 1990 (1990)
- The Martins - in their CD album An A Cappella Hymn Collection (1997)
- Amy Grant recorded a version of the song which appears on her 2002 studio album Legacy... Hymns and Faith, and later on her 2015 compilation album Be Still and Know... Hymns & Faith.
- The Mormon Tabernacle Choir recorded an arrangement of the song by Mack Wilberg on its 2009 album Come, Thou Fount Of Every Blessing: American Folk Hymns & Spirituals.
- Reba McEntire, Trisha Yearwood, and Kelly Clarkson recorded the song for Reba's Sing It Now: Songs of Faith & Hope (2017) +
- Carrie Underwood recorded the song for her album of Gospel covers, My Savior (2021).

== Use in modern culture ==
The song was featured in the film Urban Cowboy at Bud's (John Travolta's character) uncle's funeral.

The film The Trip to Bountiful makes recurrent use of the song, particularly a recording of it by Cynthia Clawson.

An a cappella version is sung by Alessandro Nivola in the film Junebug.

In the movie Walk the Line the song is played in the church that June Carter Cash takes Johnny Cash to for his first time out of the house after stopping his drug use.

The melody appears twice in the movie Abrupt Decision (2011).

The song is performed in A Prairie Home Companion.

In November 2017, Carrie Underwood performed the hymn as part of the In Memoriam segment, which culminated in a tribute to the fifty-eight Route 91 shooting victims, at the 51st annual CMA Awards.

It was performed at the funeral of Adele Stackhouse (Sookie's Granny), in True Blood.

It was also performed in the film Tender Mercies.
