= Your Life Is a Record =

Studio album by Brandy Clark
- Released: March 6, 2020
- Studios: Neon Cross, Nashville, Tennessee, United States; Royal Studios, Memphis, Tennessee, United States
- Genre: Country
- Length: 39:07
- Label: Warner
- Producer: Jay Joyce

Brandy Clark chronology
Live from Los Angeles (2017)	Your Life Is a Record (2020)	Brandy Clark (2023)

Singles from Your Life Is a Record
- 1. "Who You Thought I Was" Released: January 10, 2020

Your Life Is a Record is the third studio album by American country music artist Brandy Clark. It was released on March 6, 2020, via Warner Records. It includes the single "Who You Thought I Was". The album has received positive critical reception for Clark's songwriting skills. Despite wide acclaim, it was not as commercially successful as her previous albums, peaking at #46 the country charts and not making the Billboard Top 200 among all albums. It was nominated for the Grammy Award for Best Country Album.

On February 12, 2021, Clark announced that a deluxe edition of the album would be released on March 5, 2021, with six new songs, including live versions of "Pawn Shop" and "Who You Thought I Was" and a new version of "The Past Is the Past" featuring Lindsey Buckingham.

== Recording and release ==
As the album was nearing completion, Clark and producer Jay Joyce made a conscious effort to avoid country music cliches, using experimental musicians and strings to make sounds unlike her previous work; the singer had anxiety about if Warner Records could successfully market it past the tepid reception to her 2016 album Big Day in a Small Town. To start the recordings, Clark and Joyce began with a simple acoustic combo and only later added electric elements or string arrangements to enhance the stripped-down recordings. The album was preceded by a music video for the track "Who You Thought I Was", one of many songs on the album discussing a break-up Clark had after a 15-year relationship. This was followed by a video for "Love Is a Fire" on February 14.

The track "Better Boat" was recorded as a duet with Randy Newman.

During the COVID-19 pandemic, Clark decided to release a deluxe edition of the album that included older recordings, a brief live performance for MusiCares, and the new composition "Remember Me Beautiful".

== Critical reception ==
Professional ratings
Aggregate scores
Source	Rating
Metacritic	83/100
Review scores
Source	Rating
AllMusic	4.5/5 stars
American Songwriter	4.5/5 stars
Exclaim!	7/10
Pitchfork	7.5/10

According to the review aggregator Metacritic, Your Life Is a Record received "universal acclaim" based on a weighted average score of 83 out of 100 from seven critic scores. Album of the Year rates the consensus at 81 with four reviews.

The editorial staff of AllMusic gave the album 4.5 out of five stars, with reviewer Stephen Thomas Erlewine summing up that it's "an album that feels like a classic not just through its sound but through its depth of feeling". For Slate, Carl Wilson wrote that the release is Clark's "most personal album" yet and praises the maturity of her songwriting: "Clark has mostly left behind the exercises in women-empowerment snark and spunk that her previous records leaned on for infusions of energy, a recourse that's become its own cliché in women’s country". In a brief preview for the week in country, Billboard highlighted the release, with Annie Reuter calling Clark's "adept songwriting" the center of the album; the publication later had a full review from Tom Roland who compared this album with Clarks's previous ones to find it the most authentic songwriting and performance of her career. In assessing the album, Clark's career, and the general state of contemporary country music, The New Yorker's David Cantwell declared that "no one is writing better country songs than Brandy Clark is" and that this third album is her finest. In American Songwriter, Jason Scott gave the album 4.5 out of five, joining voices calling it her finest release, explaining Clark's strength as musician as well as producer Jay Joyce's ability to augment her voice.

A more mixed review came from Pitchfork's Sam Sodomsky, rating the album 7.5 out of 10, praising innovative arrangements and incisive and clever lyrics that will challenge listeners. Reviewing the album for Exclaim!, Kyle Mullin gave the release a seven out of 10, noting the same qualities and suggesting that other songwriters will "daydream about following in her footsteps". Chris Willman of Variety calls Clark as a songwriter "the necessary next stop [after the success of Kacey Musgraves] for anyone joining this program already in progress and finding that Music City is the richest source of fingerpicking female singer-songwriters with crystalline voices, classic twang-pop sensibilities and a knack for sweet devastation" and gives a positive review of this album for its myriad looks at relationships.

Accolades for Your Life Is a Record
Year	Issuer	Award	Recipient	Outcome
2020	Grammy Awards	Best Country Solo Performance	"Who You Thought I Was"	Nominated
2020	Grammy Awards	Best Country Album	Your Life Is a Record	Nominated
2021	Grammy Awards	Best American Roots Performance	"Same Devil"	Nominated

== Track listing ==
Your Life Is a Record track listing
No.	Title	Writer(s)	Length
1.	"I'll Be the Sad Song"	Brandy Clark; Jessie Jo Dillon; Chase McGill; Lester Snell	3:58
2.	"Long Walk"	Clark; Dillon; Jesse Frasure; Snell	2:39
3.	"Love Is a Fire"	Clark; Dillon; Shane McAnally; Snell	4:01
4.	"Pawn Shop"	Clark	3:50
5.	"Who You Thought I Was"	Clark; Dillon; Jonathan Singleton; Snell	3:09
6.	"Apologies"	Clark; Snell; Scott Stepakoff; Forest Glen Whitehead	3:23
7.	"Bigger Boat" (featuring Randy Newman)	Clark; Snell; Adam Wright	3:34
8.	"Bad Car"	Clark; Jason Saenz	3:03
9.	"Who Broke Whose Heart"	Clark; McAnally; Snell	3:02
10.	"Can We Be Strangers"	Clark; Clint Daniels; Dillon; Snell	3:29
11.	"The Past Is the Past"	Clark; Barry Dean; Luke Laird; Snell	5:00
Total length:			39:12

Deluxe Edition
No.	Title	Writer(s)	Length
12.	"Who You Thought I Was" (Live from 3rd & Lindsley)	Clark; Dillon; Singleton; Snell	3:13
13.	"Pawn Shop" (Live from 3rd & Lindsley)	Clark	3:56
14.	"Remember Me Beautiful"	Clark; Hillary Lindsey; Lori McKenna; Liz Rose	4:25
15.	"Like Mine"	Clark; Marla Cannon-Goodman; Luke Dick; Dillon; Laura Veltz; Hailey Whitters	3:26
16.	"Same Devil" (featuring Brandi Carlile)	Clark; Cannon-Goodman; Whitters	3:07
17.	"The Past Is the Past" (featuring Lindsey Buckingham)	Clark; Dean; Laird; Snell	3:35
Total length:			1:00:00

== Personnel ==
- Brandy Clark – bass guitar, acoustic guitar piano, backing and lead vocals
- Brent Anderson – backing vocals
- Court Blankenship – assistant production
- Lindsey Buckingham – guitar and vocals on Deluxe Edition version of "The Past Is the Past"
- Brandi Carlile – vocals on "Same Devil"
- Diane Cohen – violin
- Daniel Gilbert – violin
- Jedd Hughes – bass guitar; dobro; engineering; acoustic, baritone, and electric guitar, mandolin
- Jay Joyce – bass guitar, drums, acoustic and electric guitar, mixing, Omnichord, production, programming, pump organ, synthesizer, vocals
- Jonathan Kirkscey – cello, saxophone
- Beth Luscombe – viola
- Jimmy Mansfield – assistant engineering
- Lannie McMillan – flute, saxophone
- Andrew Mendelson – mastering
- Bob Mitchell – engineering
- Jessica Munson – baritone saxophone, violin
- Randy Newman – vocals on "Bigger Boat"
- John Osborne – dobro, backing vocals
- Josh Osbourne – backing vocals
- Chris Phelps – photography
- Jennifer Puckett – viola
- Giles Reaves – bongos, claves, djembe, drums, acoustic guitar, handclapping, marimba, percussion, piano, programming, synthesizer, synthesizer bass, tambourine, triangle
- Jonathan Singleton – vocals
- Kirk Smothers – flute
- Lester Snell – arrangement, band leader, viola
- Jim Spake – cello, baritone saxophone
- Chris Taylor – assistant engineering
- Scott Thompson – trumpet
- Gary Topper – flute, violin
- Priscilla Tsai – flute, violin
- Stephan Walker – art direction
- Forest Whitehead – backing vocals
- Wen-Yih You – trumpet, violin

== Chart performance ==
Chart peaks for Your Life Is a Record
Chart (2020)	Peak
Scottish Albums (Official Charts)	27
UK Americana Albums (Official Charts)	3
UK Country Albums (Official Charts)	2
US Americana/Folk Albums (Billboard)	10
US Top Album Sales (Billboard)	25
US Top Country Albums (Billboard)	46
US Top Current Album Sales (Billboard)	25

== See also ==
- List of 2020 albums
