= Have I Done Any Good? =

Mormon hymn

"Have I Done Any Good?" is a hymn of The Church of Jesus Christ of Latter-day Saints written by Will Lamartine Thompson (1847–1909), number 223 in Hymns of the Church of Jesus Christ of Latter-day Saints. The hymnal (text) was matched to the music for a popular tune "East Liverpool". It has been called "introspective" in tone, and a "popular hymn" that can be used to inspire discussion about the effectiveness of Church missions.

In the 1985 revision of the hymnal, the only change directed by Church authorities came from Apostle Boyd K. Packer: to make this hymn read "Only he who does something helps others to live/To God each good work will be known", instead of "Only he who does something is worthy to live/The world has no use for a drone".

== Lyrics ==
Have I done any good in the world today?
Have I helped anyone in need?
Have I cheered up the sad and made someone feel glad?
If not, I have failed indeed.
Has anyone's burden been lighter today
Because I was willing to share?
Have the sick and the weary been helped on their way?
When they needed my help was I there?
Then wake up and do something more
Than dream of your mansion above.
Doing good is a pleasure, a joy beyond measure,
A blessing of duty and love.

There are chances for work all around just now,
Opportunities right in our way.
Do not let them pass by, saying, "Sometime I'll try,"
But go and do something today.
'Tis noble of man to work and to give;
Love's labor has merit alone.
Only he who does something helps others to live.
To God each good work will be known.
Then wake up and do something more
Than dream of your mansion above.
Doing good is a pleasure, a joy beyond measure,
A blessing of duty and love.
