= Freedom (Reba McEntire song) =

Single by Reba McEntire

from the album Stronger Than the Truth
- Released: March 22, 2019
- Genre: Contemporary country
- Length: 3:50
- Label: Big Machine; Rockin' R
- Songwriters: James Brunswick; Tommy Cecil; Jaida Dreyer; John Pierce
- Producers: Buddy Cannon; Reba McEntire

Reba McEntire singles chronology
"God and My Girlfriends" (2017)	"Freedom" (2019)	"Does He Love You (Revisited)" (2021)

"Freedom" is a song recorded by American country artist Reba McEntire. It was composed by James Brunswick, Tommy Cecil, Jaida Dreyer and John Pierce. The track was the lead single off McEntire's 2019 album titled Stronger Than the Truth. "Freedom" became a charting single on the American country chart following its release in March 2019. It was met with favorable review from critics and writers.

== Background and content ==
"Freedom" was written by songwriters James Brunswick, Tommy Cecil, Jaida Dreyer and John Pierce. The track describes a woman who has recently found love. The song make compares the woman's freedom to that of American pride and patriotism. When Reba McEntire first heard the song, she thought it was "a patriotic song". After several listens to the track, she realized it was more of a love song: "And so it is an anthem, but it's an anthem about love," she told popculture. McEntire recorded the track with producer Buddy Cannon. McEntire also served as co-producer on the recording.

== Critical reception ==
"Freedom" received favorable reviews from writers and critics. Billy Dukes of Taste of Country described the song as a "fist-pumping anthem" in his review. All the fist-pumping gifs apply — rare is the country song that inspires such an involuntary celebration, especially one that is at its core an absolute love song." Bobby Jean Sawyer of Wide Open Country called the song "euphoric" and "joyous" in a 2019 article for the site.

== Release and chart performance ==
"Freedom" was released as a single on March 22, 2019. According to McEntire, her professional team all agreed that the song should be the lead single of her upcoming album: "Everybody was unanimous on ["Freedom"] being the first single, because it's an anthem. When you first listen to it, some people might think it's a patriotic anthem, but once you listen to the words, you know it's an anthem for this woman finding true love." The song spent one week on the Billboard Country Airplay chart, peaking at number 52 in March 2019. "Freedom" was the lead release off her 2019 studio album titled Stronger Than the Truth. The album and single were both released on Big Machine Records in conjunction with the Rockin' R. label. In April 2019, McEntire performed the single at the Academy of Country Music Awards. She also hosted the program that evening.

== Track listing ==
Digital single

- "Freedom" – 3:50

== Charts ==
Chart performance for "Freedom"
Chart (2019)	Peak position
US Country Airplay (Billboard)	52
