= Live from Los Angeles (Brandy Clark album) =

Live album by Brandy Clark
- Released: April 22, 2017
- Recorded: September 12, 2016
- Venue: Hotel Café, Los Angeles, California, United States
- Genre: Country music
- Length: 41:55
- Language: English
- Label: Warner Bros. Nashville

Brandy Clark chronology
Big Day in a Small Town (2016)	Live from Los Angeles (2017)	Your Life Is a Record (2020)

Live in Los Angeles is the first live album from American country music songwriter Brandy Clark, released as part of Record Store Day promotions on April 22, 2017 with a digital release on August 18.

== Reception ==
Tony Ives of Americana Music Show called the recording "bliss" with "two of the best country songs" to have ever graced his ears on the recording. Rolling Stone called the performance Clark at "her storytelling best, whether taking on delicate ballads... or lighthearted romps". In The Los Angeles Times, Randy Clark called the album "smart to its core", praising the depth, breadth, and humor of the lyrics.

== Track listing ==
Live from Los Angeles track listing
No.	Title	Writer(s)	Length
1.	"Drinkin' Smokin' Cheatin'"	Brandy Clark	3:25
2.	"Stripes"	Clark; Matt Jenkins; Shane McAnally	3:02
3.	"Big Day in a Small Town"	Clark; McAnally; Mark D. Sanders	3:44
4.	"Hold My Hand"	Clark; Mark Stephen Jones	3:53
5.	"Daughter"	Clark; Jessie Jo Dillon; Jeremy Spillman	3:59
6.	"Love Can Go to Hell"	Clark; Scott Stepakoff	3:57
7.	"Girl Next Door"	Clark; Dillon; McAnally	4:51
8.	"Get High"	Clark	3:33
9.	"When I Get to Drinkin'"	Clark; Josh Osborne; Stepakoff	3:46
10.	"Since You've Gone to Heaven"	Clark; McAnally	4:21
11.	"Pray to Jesus"	Clark; McAnally	3:24
Total length:			42:00

== Personnel ==
- Brandy Clark – guitar, vocals
- Miles Aubrey – backing vocals, guitar
- Chip Matthews – tracking
- Tal Miller – mastering
- Sarah Pearson – photography
- Stephen Walker – art direction, design
