= Brandy Clark =

American country music singer-songwriter

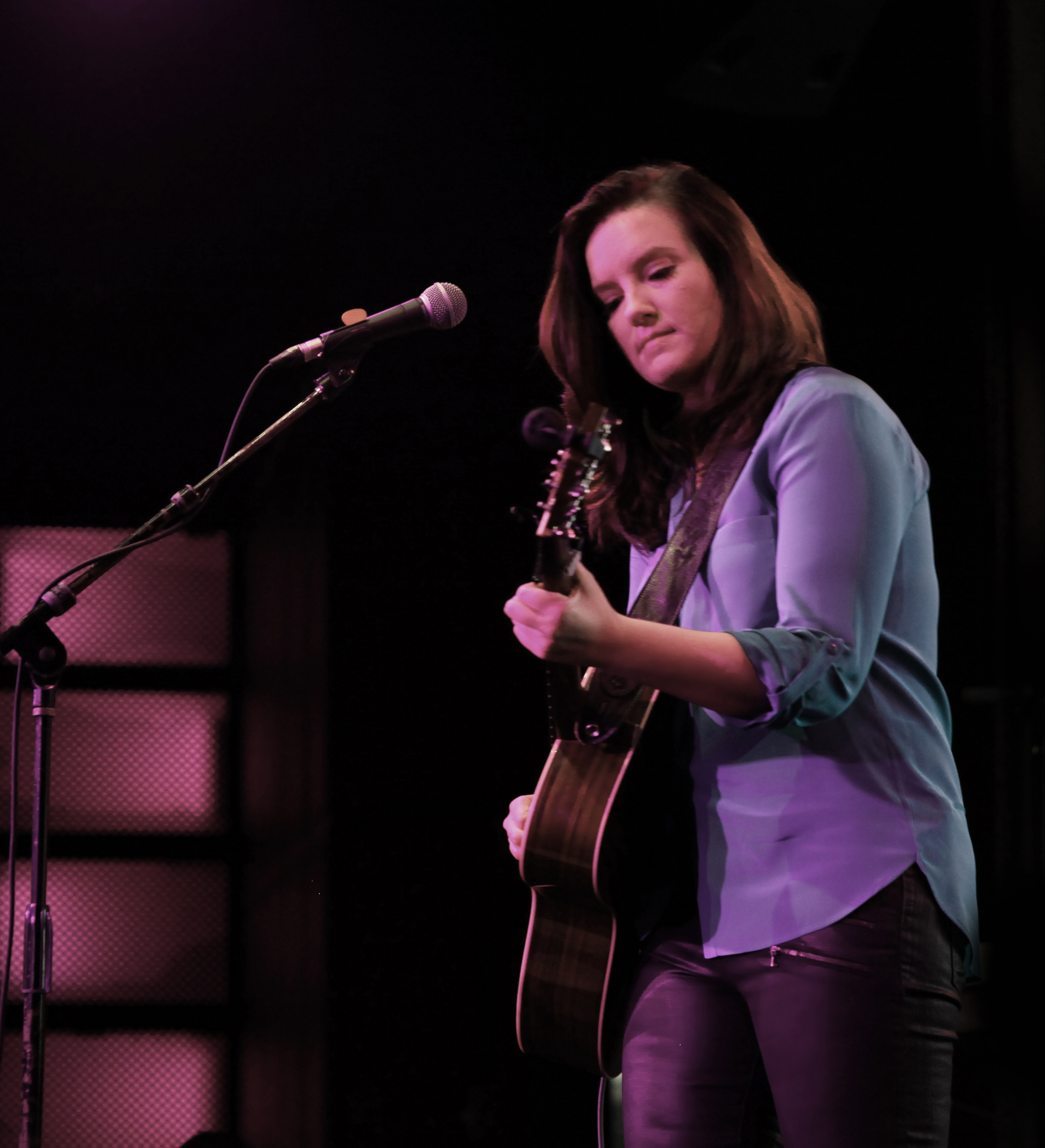
- Clark performing in June 2014

Background information
- Born: Brandy Lynn Clark; October 9, 1975 (age 51); Morton, Washington, U.S.
- Genre: Country
- Occupation: Singer-songwriter
- Instruments: Vocals; guitar; piano
- Years active: 2005–present
- Labels: Slate Creek; Warner
- Website: brandyclarkmusic.com

Brandy Lynn Clark (born October 9, 1975) is an American country music singer-songwriter. Her songs have been recorded by Sheryl Crow, Miranda Lambert, The Band Perry, Reba McEntire, LeAnn Rimes, Billy Currington, Darius Rucker, and Kacey Musgraves. She debuted as an artist in her own right in 2013 with her album 12 Stories and has released four additional studio albums. Clark is a sixteen-time Grammy Award nominee, including the 2015 Best New Artist award, and won the Country Music Association Award for Song of the Year as a co-writer on "Follow Your Arrow". In 2023, Clark and frequent collaborator Shane McAnally wrote the music and lyrics for the musical Shucked, earning a nomination for the Tony Award for Best Original Score.

== Early life ==
Brandy Clark was born in Morton, Washington, a logging town of 900 people in the shadow of Mount Rainier. As a child in the 1980s she was influenced by the country-pop and traditional country music artists she heard her parents and grandmother play, like Barbara Mandrell, Ronnie Milsap, Merle Haggard and Loretta Lynn. Clark cites the Patsy Cline biopic Sweet Dreams as one of her biggest early influences.

Clark began playing guitar at nine years old and sang in school musicals, also writing songs. She obtained a basketball scholarship at Central Washington University, but later moved back home, obtaining an associate degree from Centralia College in 1997. Still a teenager, she joined the music business program at Belmont University, and moved to Nashville in 1998. At Belmont she took guitar lessons again and joined a band with her mother and a friend. She studied commercial music and was chosen to perform in the school's "Best of the Best Showcase". Upon graduation, Clark got a job with Leadership Music which led to her eventual publishing deal.

== Music career ==
In 2011 "Mama's Broken Heart", written by Clark with Shane McAnally (her frequent collaborator) and Kacey Musgraves, appeared on Miranda Lambert's album Four the Record. It was released on January 14, 2013, as the fourth single reaching No. 2 on both the Billboard Hot Country Songs and Country Airplay charts. Clark's biggest success to date was as the co-writer along with McAnally and Trevor Rosen when she celebrated a No.1 song ASCAP Party at an industry gathering for The Band Perry's third No. 1 hit, "Better Dig Two".

As a Music Row songwriter Clark writes songs that are mostly about the seedy underbelly of country folk. They are observational pieces based on flawed characters that tell the truth on the human condition. They contain dark humor, with a blend of wit and realism, while having the artistic license to make them fictional.

In 2012 she opened shows for Grammy Award-winning artist Sheryl Crow. Brandy found an advocate in country artist Marty Stuart when on Saturday December 8, 2012 she joined him to make her Grand Ole Opry debut when she played his Grand Ole Opry Anniversary celebration and also at his Late Night Jam at Nashville's Ryman Auditorium.

At the beginning of 2013 Brandy was chosen by CMT as one of the "Women of Country", a year-long promotion featuring up and coming artists.

In December 2012, Clark digitally released a self-titled three-track EP including songs "Pray to Jesus", "Stripes" and "Take a Little Pill". The song "Stripes" was released as a single and the official video made its CMT debut on July 4, 2013. It was directed by Becky Fluke (Little Big Town, Pistol Annies) and HLN's Nancy Grace plays a cameo role.

As a co-writer of Miranda Lambert's "Mama's Broken Heart", on September 10, 2013, Brandy received a nomination in the Song of the Year category (presented to the songwriters) for the 47th Annual CMA Awards broadcast, held in Nashville on November 6, 2013. She was also twice nominated for Song of the Year at the 4th Annual American Country Awards which were held in Las Vegas on December 10, 2013.

=== 2013: 12 Stories ===
On October 22, 2013, Clark released her debut album 12 Stories. Produced by Dave Brainard, it features Vince Gill on background vocals. It made its debut at No. 28 on the Billboard Top Country Albums chart On January 6, 2014, Clark made her network CBS network TV debut on The Late Show with David Letterman, performing the lead single "Stripes". In 2014, Clark opened for Jennifer Nettles on her "That Girl" tour.

=== 2016–present: Big Day in a Small Town and Your Life Is a Record ===
On June 10, 2016, Clark released her second album Big Day in a Small Town, which was produced by Jay Joyce. Lead single "Girl Next Door" became her only chart entry to date, reaching No. 39 on Country Airplay.

Clark releasedYour Life Is a Record in 2020. Also produced by Joyce, the album was nominated for a Grammy for Best Country Album.

In 2023, Clark released a self-titled album, Brandy Clark. It was nominated for five Grammys, including Best Americana Album. Clark won the Grammy, her first, for Best Americana Performance for her song, "Dear Insecurity", featuring Brandi Carlile.

== Critical reception ==
Clark's song "Stripes" received favorable reviews from critics. Ben Foster of Country Universe praised the track: "As the first radio bid from an exceptionally talented singer-songwriter, "Stripes" does not disappoint. It's an ambitious, energetic debut single that makes the prospect of a full-length Brandy Clark album even more enticing." Foster rated the song an A.

Music roots publication Engine 145 described her as "one of the most talented songwriters on Music Row, and she proves she is as talented a performer as she is a writer." 12 Stories received a 4.5-out-of-5 rating.

Americana and Roots music blog Twang Nation placed 12 Stories at the top spot of its best of 2013 "Cream of the Crop".

Brandy Clark performing at the Baloise Session “TRUE AMERICAN ROOTS” concert on 3 November 2026 in Basel (Switzerland).

NPR music critic Ann Powers named the album her favorite of 2013. Powers noted that others share her sentiments, writing, "the top honor on many critics' lists is going to Clark, a storyteller of the highest caliber."

The Los Angeles Times wrote that Clark's 2017 release Live from Los Angeles is "smart to the core."

Your Life Is a Record has been described as "the best-sounding album that she’s released." The New Yorker wrote about the album saying, "No One Is Writing Better Country Songs than Brandy Clark Is". Writing about her 2023 self-titled album, NPR described Clark's voice as "a powerful, agile instrument that she wields masterfully".

== Personal life ==
Brandy Clark is openly a lesbian.

Clark was honored with Centralia College's Distinguished Alumni Award in 2025, recognizing her country music career and connection to the college.

== Songwriting credits ==
Songs written by Brandy Clark
Year	Title	Artist(s)	Album
2005	"That's Why I Hate Pontiacs"	Rebecca Lynn Howard	Alive and Well (unreleased)
2008	"She'll Believe You"	Kenny Rogers	50 Years
2009	"Things a Mama Don't Know"	Mica Roberts	Days You Live For
2010	"The Maker of Them All"	Guy Penrod	Breathe Deep
2010	"Cry"	Reba McEntire	All The Women I Am
2010	"The Day She Got Divorced"	Reba McEntire	All The Women I Am
2011	"Mama's Broken Heart"	Miranda Lambert	Four the Record
2011	"The Boy Never Stays"	Sarah Darling	Angels & Devils
2011	"Crazy Women"	LeAnn Rimes	Lady & Gentlemen
2011	"That's How I'll Remember You"	David Nail	The Sound of a Million Dreams
2011	"Tryin' to Go to Church"	Ashton Shepherd	Where Country Grows
2012	"Better Dig Two"	The Band Perry	Pioneer
2012	"Waitin' on a Train"	Buffy Lawson	I'm Leaving You for Me
2012	"We Can't Be Friends"	Joanna Smith	—N/a
2012	"Boys and Buses"	Hayden Panettiere	The Music of Nashville, Season 1: The Complete Collection
2013	"Dandelion"	Kacey Musgraves	Same Trailer Different Park
2013	"Follow Your Arrow"	Kacey Musgraves	Same Trailer Different Park
2013	"It Is What It Is"	Kacey Musgraves	Same Trailer Different Park
2013	"Hollywood"	Maggie Rose	Cut to Impress
2013	"Love Without You"	Darius Rucker	True Believers
2013	"You Can Come Over"	Craig Campbell	Never Regret
2013	"Get Outta My Yard"	Gretchen Wilson	Right on Time
2013	"Come Back To Me"	Keith Urban	Fuse
2013	"Songs About Trucks"	Wade Bowen	Wade Bowen
2013	"We'll Come Back Around"	Craig Morgan	The Journey (Livin' Hits)
2013	"Last Night's Make Up"	Pam Tillis and Lorrie Morgan	Dos Divas
2013	"Homecoming Queen"	Sheryl Crow	Feels Like Home
2014	"Two Rings Shy"	Miranda Lambert	Platinum
2014	"Burnin' Bed'	David Nail	I'm a Fire
2014	"Bad Girl Phase"	Sunny Sweeney	Provoked
2014	"Wheels On The House"	Ray Scott	Ray Scott
2014	"Bad Car"	Terri Clark	Some Songs
2014	"I Cheated On You"	Terri Clark	Some Songs
2014	"Drunk Americans"	Toby Keith	35 MPH Town
2015	"She Got Drunk Last Night"	Reba McEntire	Love Somebody
2015	"Late to the Party"	Kacey Musgraves	Pageant Material
2015	"This Town"	Kacey Musgraves	Pageant Material
2015	"Biscuits"	Kacey Musgraves	Pageant Material
2015	"Miserable"	Kacey Musgraves	Pageant Material
2016	"Liar Liar"	Aubrie Sellers	New City Blues
2016	"Pawn Shop"	Shelley Skidmore	Shelley Skidmore
2016	"White Picket Fences"	Shelley Skidmore	Shelley Skidmore
2016	"Chaser"	Jennifer Nettles	Playing with Fire
2016	"Drunk in Heels"	Jennifer Nettles	Playing with Fire
2016	"Playing with Fire"	Jennifer Nettles	Playing with Fire
2016	"Salvation Works"	Jennifer Nettles	Playing with Fire
2016	"Starting Over"	Jennifer Nettles	Playing with Fire
2016	"Sugar"	Jennifer Nettles	Playing with Fire
2016	"Unlove You"	Jennifer Nettles	Playing with Fire
2016	"Christmas Makes Me Cry"	Kacey Musgraves	A Very Kacey Christmas
2017	"Pray to Jesus"	The Oak Ridge Boys	17th Avenue Revival
2017	"Bad Girl Phase"	Sunny Sweeney	Provoked
2019	"Tammy Wynette Kind of Pain"	Reba McEntire	Stronger Than the Truth
2020	"Red Wine & Blue"	Hailey Whitters	The Dream
2020	"Ten Year Town"	Hailey Whitters	The Dream
2020	"Sparrow"	Ashley McBryde	Never Will
2020	"Voodoo Doll"	Ashley McBryde	Never Will
2021	"Dear Miss Loretta"	Carly Pearce featuring Patty Loveless	29: Written in Stone
2022	"Brenda Put Your Bra On"	Ashley McBryde	Lindeville
2022	"Dandelion Diner"	Ashley McBryde	Lindeville
2022	"The Girl in the Picture"	Ashley McBryde	Lindeville
2022	"If These Dogs Could Talk"	Ashley McBryde	Lindeville
2022	"Play Ball"	Ashley McBryde	Lindeville
2022	"Ronnie's Pawn Shop"	Ashley McBryde	Lindeville
2022	"The Missed Connection Section of the Lindeville Gazette"	Ashley McBryde	Lindeville
2022	"Gospel Night at the Strip Club"	Ashley McBryde	Lindeville
2022	"Forkem Family Funeral Home"	Ashley McBryde	Lindeville
2022	"Bonfire at Tina's"	Ashley McBryde	Lindeville
2022	"Lindeville"	Ashley McBryde	Lindeville
2023	"Tennessee's Waiting"	King Calaway	Tennessee's Waiting
2024	"Treehouse"	Ben Platt	Honeymind
2025	"Trailblazer"	Reba McEntire, Miranda Lambert, and Lainey Wilson	—N/a

== Discography ==
=== Studio albums ===
Brandy Clark studio album releases and sales performance
Title	Details	Peak chart positions						Sales
Title	Details	US Country	US	US Heat	US Indie	US Folk	UK Country	Sales
12 Stories	Release date: October 22, 2013; Label: Slate Creek Records; Format: CD, digital download	23	163	2	22	—	10	US: 46,000
Big Day in a Small Town	Release date: June 10, 2016; Label: Warner Bros. Records; Format: CD, digital download	8	82	—	—	5	3	US: 15,500
Your Life Is a Record	Release date: March 6, 2020; Label: Warner Records; Format: CD, digital download	46	—	—	—	10	2	
Brandy Clark	Release date: May 19, 2023; Label: Warner Records; Format: CD, digital download	—	—	—	—	—	3	
"—" denotes releases that did not chart

=== Live albums ===
Brandy Clark live album releases and sales performance
Title	Details
Live from Los Angeles	Release date: April 2017; Label: Warner Bros. Records

=== Singles ===
Brandy Clark single releases and sales performance
Year	Single	Peak positions	Album
Year	Single	US Country Airplay	Album
2013	"Stripes"	—	12 Stories
2016	"Girl Next Door"	39	Big Day in a Small Town
2016	"Love Can Go to Hell"	—	Big Day in a Small Town
2020	"Who You Thought I Was"	—	Your Life Is a Record
2020	"Same Devil" (featuring Brandi Carlile)	—	Your Life Is a Record (Deluxe Edition)
2020	"Like Mine"	—	Your Life Is a Record (Deluxe Edition)
2023	"Buried"	—	Brandy Clark
2023	"Dear Insecurity" (featuring Brandi Carlile)	—	Brandy Clark
2023	"My Favourite Christmas" / "I'll Be Home for Christmas"	—	Non-albums single
"—" denotes releases that did not chart

=== Other charted songs ===
Brandy Clark charting songs
Year	Single	Peak positions	Album
Year	Single	US Country Digital	Album
2015	"Hold My Hand"	49	12 Stories

=== Music videos ===
Brandy Clark music video details
Year	Video	Director
2013	"Stripes"	Becky Fluke
2014	"Get High"	
2014	"His Hands" (with Jennifer Nettles)	Shaun Silva/Valarie Allyn Bienas
2016	"Girl Next Door"	Traci Goudie
2023	"Dear Insecurity" (featuring Brandi Carlile)	Trey Fanjoy

== Awards and nominations ==
Brandy Clark award nominations
Year	Organization	Award	Work	Result	Ref
2013	47th Country Music Association Awards	Song of the Year	"Mama's Broken Heart"	Nominated	
2013	56th Grammy Awards	Best Country Song	"Mama's Broken Heart"	Nominated	
2014	49th Academy of Country Music Awards	Song of the Year	"Mama's Broken Heart"	Nominated	
2014	48th Country Music Association Awards	Song of the Year	"Follow Your Arrow"	Won	
2014	48th Country Music Association Awards	New Artist of the Year	Herself	Nominated	
2015	57th Grammy Awards	Best Country Album	12 Stories	Nominated	
2015	57th Grammy Awards	Best New Artist	Herself	Nominated	
2016	58th Grammy Awards	Best Country Song	"Hold My Hand"	Nominated	
2017	59th Grammy Awards	Best Country Solo Performance	"Love Can Go to Hell"	Nominated	
2017	59th Grammy Awards	Best Country Album	Big Day in a Small Town	Nominated	
2017	52nd Academy of Country Music Awards	New Female Vocalist of the Year	Herself	Nominated	
2021	63rd Grammy Awards	Best Country Album	Your Life Is a Record	Nominated	
2021	63rd Grammy Awards	Best Country Solo Performance	"Who You Thought I Was"	Nominated	
2021	32nd GLAAD Media Awards	Outstanding Music Artist	Herself	Nominated	
2023	Drama Desk Awards	Outstanding Music	Shucked	Won	
2023	Drama Desk Awards	Outstanding Lyrics	Shucked	Nominated	
2023	Outer Critics Circle Awards	Outstanding New Score	Shucked	Nominated	
2023	76th Tony Awards	Best Original Score	Shucked	Nominated	
2024	66th Grammy Awards	Best Musical Theater Album	Shucked	Nominated	
2024	66th Grammy Awards	Best Country Solo Performance	"Buried"	Nominated	
2024	66th Grammy Awards	Best Country Song	"Buried"	Nominated	
2024	66th Grammy Awards	Best Americana Performance	"Dear Insecurity"	Won	
2024	66th Grammy Awards	Best American Roots Song	"Dear Insecurity"	Nominated	
2024	66th Grammy Awards	Best Americana Album	Brandy Clark	Nominated	
