= God and My Girlfriends =

Single by Reba McEntire

from the album Sing It Now: Songs of Faith & Hope
- Released: 2017
- Genre: Contemporary Christian; country
- Length: 3:25
- Label: Big Machine; Capitol Christian; Nash Icon; Rockin' R
- Songwriter(s): Patricia Conroy; Lisa Hentrich; Marcia Ramirez
- Producer(s): Reba McEntire; Doug Sisemore

Reba McEntire singles chronology
"Back to God" (2017)	"God and My Girlfriends" (2017)	"Freedom" (2019)

"God and My Girlfriends" is a song originally recorded by American country artist Reba McEntire. The track was composed by Patricia Conroy, Lisa Hentrich and Marcia Ramirez. It was one of three singles spawned from McEntire's 2017 Christian album titled Sing It Now: Songs of Faith & Hope. "God and My Girlfriends" reached charting positions on two Billboard singles lists following its release.

== Background and content ==
The song was produced by McEntire herself, along with Doug Sisemore. Co-writer Lisa Hentrich spoke about the song's significance on her official website and its performance by Reba McEntire: "It has been a special part of my personal faith journey. Only by divine orchestration could a voice that was once lost (my singing voice) be resurrected at the same time an 8-year-old song was 'found again' by the unmatchable voice of Reba McEntire."

== Release and chart performance ==
"God and My Girlfriends" was first released as an album track on McEntire's Sing It Now: Songs of Faith & Hope. It was one of ten Contemporary Christian recordings included on the second disc of McEntire's album. Following the album's release, she performed the song in an appearance on The Today Show, as well as at the Ryman Auditorium. The song spent three weeks on the Billboard Country Airplay chart, peaking at number 53 in December 2017. It also spent five weeks on the Billboard Hot Christian Songs chart, peaking at number 32 in 2017. It was her fifth and final single to date to reach a charting Christian songs position.

== Communities ==
Since release the song's release, multiple faith-based groups have been created by co-writers. Hentrich founded a community called GAMGstories focused on "praising God and celebrating girlfriends" through interviews, blogs, and resources. Fellow co-writer Marcia Ramirez founded a non-profit called God And My Girlfriends Ministries that "[helps] women grow spiritually, learn to love and embrace themselves, and have stronger, healthier friendships with the other women in their lives."

== Track listing ==
Digital single

- "God and My Girlfriends" – 3:25

== Charts ==
Chart performance for "God and My Girlfriends"
Chart (2017)	Peak position
US Christian Songs (Billboard)	32
US Country Airplay (Billboard)	53
