= Stronger Than the Truth =

2019 studio album by Reba McEntire

Studio album by Reba McEntire
- Released: April 5, 2019
- Recorded: September 2018
- Studios: The Tracking Room, Blackbird Studio, Sound Emporium Studios and Curb Studios (Nashville, Tennessee)
- Genre: Neotraditional country
- Length: 47:20
- Labels: Big Machine; Rockin' R
- Producers: Buddy Cannon; Reba McEntire

Reba McEntire chronology
Sing It Now: Songs of Faith & Hope (2017)	Stronger Than the Truth (2019)	Revived Remixed Revisited (2021)

Singles from Stronger Than the Truth
- 1. "Freedom" Released: March 22, 2019

Stronger Than the Truth is the thirty-second studio album by American country music singer Reba McEntire. It was released on April 5, 2019, by Big Machine Records. The album was nominated for Best Country Album at the 62nd Grammy Awards.

== Background ==
On September 18, 2018, McEntire posted a picture on Instagram stating that she was back in the studio, and told The Boot that; "It's gonna be probably the most country album I've ever recorded." She also described it as "real country", and was inspired by the music she grew up listening to." In a press release, McEntire explained her inspiration and song selection, saying, "The response to Sing It Now: Songs of Faith & Hope reinforced my love for recording songs that speak to the heart. So when I started selecting songs for this album, I stuck with that same formula – go with the songs that touch my heart, and hopefully when you hear me singing it, they'll touch yours too. That honesty once again revealed itself."

The track "Cactus in a Coffee Can" was originally recorded by Jerry Kilgore on his 1999 album Love Trip.

== Promotion and release ==
The album was announced on February 11, 2019. The first promotional single from the album, "Stronger Than the Truth", was released on February 15, along with the album's pre-order. McEntire also announced that a new song from the album would be released each Friday leading up the album's April 5 release date. "No U in Oklahoma" was released as the second promotional single on February 22. On March 1, "In His Mind" was released as the third promotional single. "Tammy Wynette Kind of Pain" was released on March 8 as the fourth promotional single. The fifth promotional single, "Storm in a Shot Glass" was released on March 15. "Freedom" was released as the album's lead single on March 22.

On March 28, the album became available for streaming exclusively on NPR Music's website as a part of their First Listen series.

McEntire also performed the album's single "Freedom" on the 54th Academy of Country Music Awards on April 8, 2019

== Commercial performance ==
Stronger Than the Truth debuted at No. 4 on Billboard' Top Country Albums, with 20,000 traditional albums sold (21,000 in equivalent album units). It is her 27th top 10 in the Top Country Albums chart, the first of which she achieved 33 years ago on April 19, 1986, with Whoever's in New England. The album has sold 57,500 copies in the United States as of March 2020.

== Critical reception ==
Rating it 4 out of 5 stars, Stephen Thomas Erlewine of AllMusic called it a "pure, unadorned country album" and "flinty even when it's tender". He also wrote that "She channels this empathetic toughness into a series of songs that plays like short stories...and that deft, subtle blend of music and message gives Stronger Than the Truth a lasting emotional resonance."

== Track listing ==
Stronger Than the Truth
No.	Title	Writer(s)	Length
1.	"Swing All Night Long with You"	Sidney Cox; Jon Randall	4:42
2.	"Stronger Than the Truth"	Hannah Louise Blaylock; Autumn McEntire	4:10
3.	"Storm in a Shot Glass"	Mary Browder; Will Robinson; Leslie Satcher	3:02
4.	"Tammy Wynette Kind of Pain"	Brandy Clark; Mark Narmore; Shelley Skidmore	3:58
5.	"Cactus in a Coffee Can"	Steve Seskin; Allen Shamblin	4:27
6.	"Your Heart"	Kellys Collins	3:57
7.	"The Clown"	Dallas Davidson; Hillary Lindsey; James T. Slater	5:07
8.	"No U in Oklahoma"	Reba McEntire; Ronnie Dunn; Donna McSpadden	3:08
9.	"The Bar's Getting Lower"	Collins; Erin Enderlin; Liz Hengber; Alex Kline	3:27
10.	"In His Mind"	R. McEntire; Hengber; Tommy Lee James	3:33
11.	"Freedom"	James Brunswick; Tommy Cecil; Jaida Dreyer; John Pierce	3:50
12.	"You Never Gave Up on Me"	Billy Aerts; Burton Collins	3:59
Total length:			47:20

Target edition bonus tracks
No.	Title	Writer(s)	Length
13.	"While You Were Sleeping"	Bonnie Baker; Robin Lee Bruce; Mitzi Dawn	3:07
14.	"Ain't Got Nothin' on My Pain"	Morgane Hayes; Liz Rose; Chris Stapleton	3:08
Total length:			53:35

== Personnel ==
Adapted from the album liner notes.

Vocals

- Reba McEntire – lead vocals
- Wyatt Beard – backing vocals (1, 3, 7–9, 11, 13, 14)
- Jenifer Wrinkle – backing vocals (1, 3, 4, 7–11, 13, 14)
- Melonie Cannon – backing vocals (3, 5)
- Sonya Isaacs – backing vocals (4)
- Buddy Cannon – backing vocals (5)

Musicians

- Jim "Moose" Brown – acoustic piano (1–10, 13, 14), Hammond B3 organ (3), synthesizer (11)
- Catherine Marx – acoustic piano (12)
- Jeff King – electric guitar (1–11, 13, 14)
- Brent Mason – electric guitar (1–4, 6–11, 13, 14), acoustic guitar (5)
- Bobby Terry – acoustic guitar (1–11, 13, 14), banjo (3)
- Mike Johnson – steel guitar (1–11, 13, 14), dobro (5)
- Larry Paxton – bass (1–11, 13, 14)
- Tony Creasman – drums (1–11, 13, 14), tambourine (13)
- Joe Spivey – fiddle (1–4, 6–11, 13, 14)
- Deanie Richardson – fiddle (5), viola (5)

=== Production ===
- Allison Jones – A&R
- Buddy Cannon – producer
- Reba McEntire – producer
- Tony Castle – recording, mixing
- Alex Carter – recording assistant (1, 14)
- Bryce Roberts – recording assistant (1–11, 13, 14)
- Nick Davison – recording assistant (3, 7–9)
- Jason Mott – recording assistant (3, 4, 11–13)
- Ned Singh – recording assistant (3, 7–9)
- Andrew Mendelson – mastering at Georgetown Masters (Nashville, Tennessee)
- Taylor Chadwick – mastering assistant
- Bobbi Geil – mastering assistant
- Megan Peterson – mastering assistant
- Shannon Finnegan – production coordinator
- Janice Soled – copy coordinator
- Brianna Steinitz – copy coordinator
- Robby Klein – photography
- Justin McIntosh – art direction, graphic design, wardrobe
- Loretta Harper – wardrobe
- Leslie Matthews – wardrobe
- Brett Freedman – hair, make-up

== Charts ==
=== Weekly charts ===
Chart (2019)	Peak position
Australian Albums (ARIA)	106
Australian Digital Albums (ARIA)	18
Scottish Albums (Official Charts)	36
UK Country Albums (Official Charts)	3
US Billboard 200	22
US Top Country Albums (Billboard)	4

=== Year-end charts ===
Chart (2019)	Position
US Top Country Albums (Billboard)	93
