= Will Lamartine Thompson =

American composer (1847–1909)

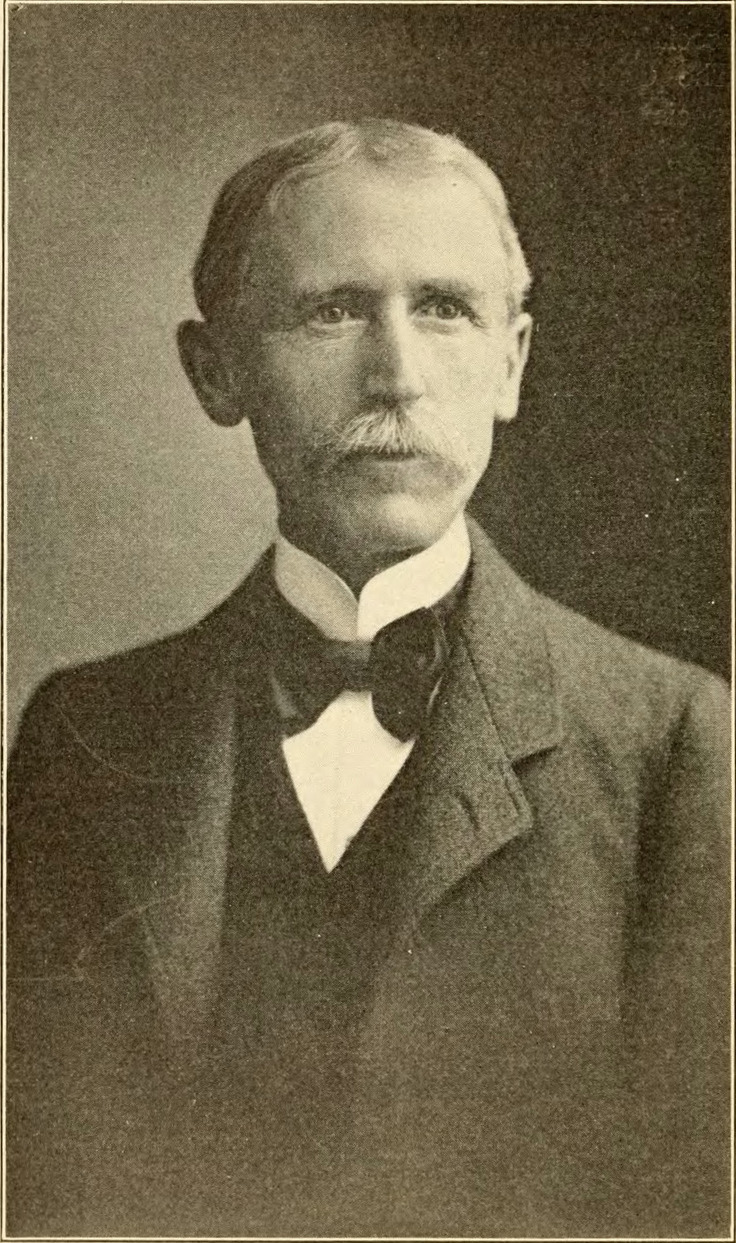
- Born: November 7, 1847; East Liverpool
- Died: September 20, 1909 (aged 61); New York City
- Occupation: Composer

William Lamartine Thompson (November 7, 1847 – September 20, 1909) was an American composer and music publisher. He founded the W. L. Thompson Music Company and tried his hand with some success at secular compositions before finding his forte in hymns and gospel songs.

== Education, family and community ==
Thompson was born November 7, 1847, in East Liverpool, Ohio, the youngest son of seven children of Josiah Thompson, who was a successful merchant, manufacturer, and banker, and a two-term member of the Ohio state legislature. His mother, Sarah Jackman Thompson, was devoted to social and charitable work.

Thompson graduated from Mount Union College in Alliance, Ohio, in 1870. In 1873, he attended the New England Conservatory of Music and later continued his musical studies in Leipzig, Germany.

Thompson married Elizabeth Johnson. They had a son, William Leland Thompson (born 1895), who was known by his middle name. The Thompsons built a large hilltop mansion on Park Boulevard in East Liverpool. The house still stands and is known locally as "the Softly and Tenderly House" (see "Hymns and gospel songs").

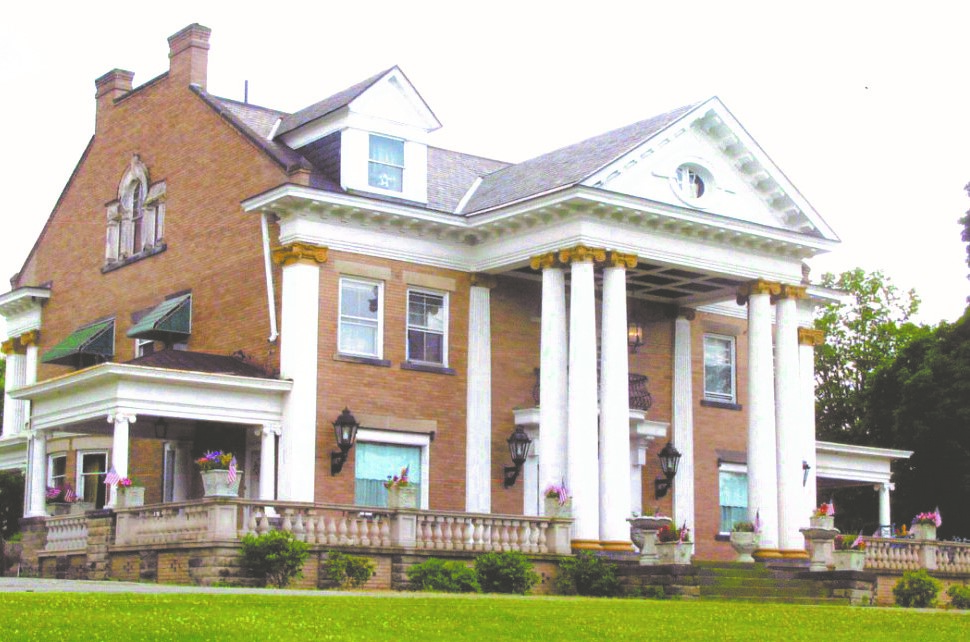
WL Thompson home

Thompson took a strong interest in local history, and paid for a large stone and tablet to mark the spot where Confederate General John Hunt Morgan and his raiders were captured near Lisbon, Ohio. Thompson donated large tracts of land to East Liverpool for public parks, stipulating that no alcohol would be permitted there.

== Secular career ==
Thompson began composing in his teens and in addition to hymns, wrote about 100 secular songs, including "My Home on the Old Ohio" and "Gathering Shells from the Seashore."

Both a lyricist and composer, Thompson ensured he would always remember words or melodies that came to him at odd times. He said, "No matter where I am, at home or hotel, at the store or traveling, if an idea or theme comes to me that I deem worthy of a song, I jot it down in verse. In this way I never lose it."

Rebuffed in an early attempt to sell his songs to a commercial publisher, Thompson eventually opened the W. L. Thompson Music Company in East Liverpool. By the 1880s, it was one of the most prominent and successful such businesses in the United States. Thousands of music teachers and musicians ordered sheet music, instruments, and other supplies from Thompson's store. Thompson later founded a music and publishing company in Chicago.

== Hymns and gospel songs ==
A member of the Church of Christ, Thompson is best known as the writer and composer of hymns and gospel songs, to which he increasingly devoted his talents after his teenage years.

His most well-known work is the classic and enduring gospel song "Softly and Tenderly Jesus Is Calling" (1880) which has been translated into countless languages. It has been featured in the films Junebug and A Prairie Home Companion (sung by Meryl Streep and Lily Tomlin), in the Anne Tyler novel The Accidental Tourist, and the television series True Blood. Cynthia Clawson's interpretation of the song is used as background throughout the 1985 movie The Trip to Bountiful.

Other popular gospel songs by Thompson which continue in use, particularly in the Churches of Christ, Southern Baptist and the Church of Jesus Christ of Latter-day Saints, are "Put Your Shoulder to the Wheel" - "Lead Me Gently Home, Father" (1879), "There's a Great Day Coming" (1887), "Jesus Is All the World to Me" (1904), "Have I Done Any Good in the World Today?", and "The World Has Need of Willing Men".

== Pseudonyms ==
Thompson published his own works under a variety of pseudonyms, such as James Orr, J. Calvin Bushey, Warren Bestley, S. S. Meyers, Will T. Meyers, Will Baker, John Rutledge, John Armstrong, and Will Lamartine.

== Final illness and death ==
Thompson fell ill during a tour of Europe, and his family cut short their travels to return home. He died a few weeks later in New York City on September 20, 1909.

== Legacy ==
The famous evangelist Dwight L. Moody admired Thompson's music and used "Softly and Tenderly" in many of his evangelistic rallies in America and Britain. When Moody lay dying, after all visitation had stopped, Thompson called on him. He was refused until Moody learned it was Thompson. Then he insisted on seeing the songwriter. Moody is said to have encouraged Thompson by saying, "Will, I would rather have written 'Softly and Tenderly' than anything I have been able to do in my whole life." Moody died shortly afterwards while singing the words of that hymn.

"Softly and Tenderly Jesus Is Calling" was sung by the choir of Atlanta's Ebenezer Baptist Church at the funeral for Dr. Martin Luther King, Jr. and is used widely today as an invitation hymn in evangelistic services.

== See also ==
- Christian music
- Hymn
- Music publishing
