= Big Day in a Small Town =

Studio album by Brandy Clark
- Released: June 10, 2016
- Genre: Country
- Length: 40:20
- Label: Warner Bros. Nashville
- Producer: Jay Joyce

Brandy Clark chronology
12 Stories (2013)	Big Day in a Small Town (2016)	Live from Los Angeles (2017)

Singles from Big Day in a Small Town
- 1. "Girl Next Door" Released: February 16, 2016; 2. "Love Can Go to Hell" Released: September 12, 2016; 3. "Three Kids No Husband" Released: April 2017

Big Day in a Small Town is the second studio album by American country music artist Brandy Clark. It was released on June 10, 2016, through Warner Bros. Records. The album was nominated for Best Country Album and the album's second single, "Love Can Go To Hell", was nominated for Best Country Solo Performance at the 59th Annual Grammy Awards.

== Background ==
Two of the album's tracks were previously recorded by other artists: "Homecoming Queen" previously appeared on Feels Like Home, the 2013 studio album by Sheryl Crow, and "Three Kids No Husband" previously appeared on the 2014 album Numbered Doors, by its co-writer Lori McKenna.

The track "Daughter" features Clark's close friend and collaborator Kacey Musgraves on harmony vocals.

== Critical reception ==
Professional ratings
Aggregate scores
Source	Rating
Metacritic	84/100
Review scores
Source	Rating
AllMusic	4.5/5 stars
Exclaim!	9/10
Rolling Stone	4/5 stars
Spin	8/10
Uncut	8/10
Vice (Expert Witness)	A−

Big Day in a Small Town received highly positive reviews from music critics. At Metacritic, which assigns a normalized rating out of 100 to reviews from mainstream critics, the album has an average score of 84 out of 100, which indicates "universal acclaim" based on 5 reviews. Stephen Thomas Erlewine of AllMusic states: "Songs rarely come much better than these." Rolling Stone's Will Hermes calls it "music tooled alternately for stadiums and songwriting circles, commercial and public radio, line-dance bars and coffee shops." Additionally, it was the Spin "album of the week" and called "fantastic; often a superb piece of recorded music" by reviewer Alfred Soto. The Boston Globe's Stuart Munro wrote: "If you're looking for alternatives to mainstream country, Clark is still providing one... you just have to keep listening beyond the first two tracks to find it."

Award nominations for Big Day in a Small Town
Year	Association	Category	Result
2017	Grammy Awards	Best Country Album	Nominated

Accolades for Big Day in a Small Town
Publication	Rank	List
AllMusic	N/A	Best Albums of 2016
American Songwriter	21	Top 50 Albums of 2016
Entertainment Weekly	8	The Best Country Albums of 2016
Rolling Stone	6	40 Best Country Albums of 2016
Rolling Stone	27	50 Best Albums of 2016
Stereogum	4	The 20 Best Country Albums of 2016
Uproxx	7	The 20 Best Country Albums of 2016

== Track listing ==
Writing credits source: BMI

All tracks are written by Brandy Clark, with additional co-writers as noted.

Big Day in a Small Town track listing
No.	Title	Writer(s)	Length
1.	"Soap Opera"	Bryan Simpson	3:25
2.	"Girl Next Door"	Jessie Jo Dillon; Shane McAnally	4:33
3.	"Homecoming Queen"	Luke Laird; McAnally	3:07
4.	"Broke"	McAnally; Josh Osborne	3:39
5.	"You Can Come Over"	Dillon; Mark Narmore	3:53
6.	"Love Can Go to Hell"	Scott Stepakoff	3:58
7.	"Big Day in a Small Town"	McAnally; Mark D. Sanders	3:43
8.	"Three Kids No Husband"	Lori McKenna	3:14
9.	"Daughter"	Dillon; Jeremy Spillman	3:19
10.	"Drinkin', Smokin', Cheatin'"		2:57
11.	"Since You've Gone to Heaven"	McAnally	4:32
Total length:			40:20

== Personnel ==
Credits adapted from AllMusic.

Musicians

- Brandy Clark – acoustic guitar, lead vocals, background vocals
- John Deaderick – keyboards
- Fred Eltringham – drums
- Keith Gattis – guitar
- Jason Hall – background vocals
- Jay Joyce – banjo, guitar, organ, background vocals
- Shane McAnally – background vocals
- Pat McGrath – resonator guitar
- Rob McNelley – guitar
- Kacey Musgraves – background vocals
- Josh Osborne – background vocals
- Dave Roe – bass guitar
- Morgane Stapleton – background vocals
- Forest Glen Whitehead – guitar, background vocals

Technical personnel

- Paul Cossette – assistant engineer
- Jason Hall – engineer, mixing
- Chris Johnson – photography
- Jay Joyce – engineer, mixing, producer
- Pamela Littky – portrait photography
- Dan McCarroll – A&R
- Melissa Spillman – production assistant
- Caleb VanBuskirk – assistant engineer
- Stephen Walker – art direction, design, illustrations
- Cate Wright – A&R

== Commercial performance ==
Big Day in a Small Town debuted at number eighty-two on the US Billboard 200 chart with 8,100 equivalent album units; it sold 7,400 copies in its first week, with the remainder of its unit total reflecting the album's streaming activity and track sales. As of August 2016 the album has sold 15,500 copies in the US.

== Chart performance ==
Chart performance for Big Day in a Small Town
Chart (2016)	Peak position
UK Country Albums (Official Charts)	3
US Billboard 200	82
US Top Country Albums (Billboard)	8
US Americana/Folk Albums (Billboard)	5

== Release history ==
Release history of Big Day in a Small Town
Region	Date	Format(s)	Label
United States	June 10, 2016	CD; digital download; vinyl	Warner Bros.
