= Back to God =

2017 single by Reba McEntire

Single by Reba McEntire

from the album Sing It Now: Songs of Faith & Hope
- Released: January 20, 2017
- Genre: Christian country
- Length: 4:50
- Label: Nash Icon; Big Machine; Capitol Christian
- Songwriter(s): Randy Houser; Dallas Davidson
- Producer(s): Doug Sisemore; Reba McEntire

Reba McEntire singles chronology
"Softly and Tenderly" (2016)	"Back to God" (2017)	"God and My Girlfriends" (2017)

Lauren Daigle singles chronology
"Come Alive (Dry Bones)" (2016)	"Back to God" (2017)	"O'Lord" (2017)

Music video
- "Back To God" on YouTube

"Back to God" is a song performed by American singer, Reba McEntire. It was released as the second single from her 2017 album, Sing It Now: Songs of Faith & Hope, on January 20, 2017. A duet version with Lauren Daigle was released on April 2, 2017. The song became McEntire's first Hot Christian Songs No. 1, and Daigle's second. The track held the No. 1 position for one week.

== Background ==
"Back to God" was originally released on January 20, 2017 as the second single from McEntire's twenty-ninth studio album "Sing It Now: Songs of Faith & Hope." The song was written by Dallas Davidson and Randy Houser. McEntire produced the track with Doug Sisemore]. McEntire performed the song alongside Lauren Daigle at the 2017 American Country Music Awards. The performance was met with great praise, prompting them to release an official duet version of the song on April 2, 2017.

Houser originally recorded the song for his 2008 album, Anything Goes. McEntire found it, and said the song had a special place in her heart. “When Randy didn’t release it as a single, I thought, hmm, maybe someday I get to do that,” she said. “I had to make it different because his [version] was so good … So we got it on there, but it’s a great song! Everybody was saying, ‘Oh my gosh, we need this, we need this song right now.’ Well, we’ve always needed this song.” The track is about getting closer to God, when you seem to have drifted away.

== Music video ==
The music video for the single was released on January 24, 2017. In the video, directed by Mason Dixon and filmed at the Tulip Street United Methodist Church in East Nashville, scenes of McEntire alone in the church are scattered with shots of different people feeling loss and hurt of faith, ultimately united by their collective experience within the church during a service, where they (McEntire included) start to heal.

== Track listing ==
- Digital download
1. "Back To God" – 4:49
- Digital download (with Lauren Daigle)
1. "Back To God" – 4:03
- Digital download (acoustic)
1. "Back To God" – 4:55

== Charts ==
=== Weekly charts ===
Chart (2017)	Peak position
US Bubbling Under Hot 100 (Billboard)	11
US Hot Christian Songs (Billboard)	1
US Country Airplay (Billboard)	41
US Hot Country Songs (Billboard)	25
US Digital Song Sales (Billboard)	37

=== Year-end charts ===
Chart (2017)	Peak position
US Christian Songs (Billboard)	30
