= 12 Stories =

Studio album by Brandy Clark
- Released: October 22, 2013
- Genres: Country, Americana
- Length: 42:14
- Label: Slate Creek
- Producer: Dave Brainard

Brandy Clark chronology
12 Stories (2013)	Big Day in a Small Town (2016)

Singles from 12 Stories
- 1. "Stripes" Released: August 28, 2013; 2. "Pray to Jesus" Released: 2013; 3. "Hungover" Released: May 2014

12 Stories is the debut studio album by American country music singer-songwriter Brandy Clark, released on October 22, 2013, through Slate Creek Records. Clark wrote or co-wrote all 12 of the songs and it features Vince Gill on background vocals. The songs on the album are mostly ones which were admired by, but not recorded by, other artists, possibly due to the provocative storytelling and their content, which is a Clark trademark. Two of the album's tracks were previously recorded by other artists: "Crazy Women" was a Top 40 hit on the Billboard Hot Country Songs chart for LeAnn Rimes as the second single from her 2011 album, Lady & Gentlemen, and "The Day She Got Divorced" was previously recorded by Reba McEntire for her 2010 album, All the Women I Am.

== Background ==
When Clark first moved to Nashville around 1997 she wanted to be a recording artist, but instead concentrated on her song writing which is her true passion. It took her many years to hone a voice as an individual artist with a view to creating songs which would be commercially viable and which people wanted to listen to. She played occasional gigs and made demo tapes enough to finance an EP to sell at songwriters’ night shows. In 2010 her two co-managers heard that EP and told her they would help finance a full studio record along with a management company. As a respected Music Row songwriter she was also encouraged by friends in the business to release a batch of her own material. 12 Stories was finished nearly two years before its release, as Clark waited for record label interest and distribution. Previous to this and during that time span she had become a part of a tight circle of friends and regular song collaborators that included singing songwriters Miranda Lambert, Ashley Monroe, Kacey Musgraves, Shane McAnally, Josh Osborne and Trevor Rosen, some of whom contribute to the album.

== Music and lyrics ==
Teaming up with producer Dave Brainard, 12 Stories draws on styles such as country folk and catchy country pop performed in midtempo in both classic and contemporary styles with arrangements which are sparse and clean. They first toyed with making the album a concept record, chronicling a couple's relationship but ended up rejecting the idea but that instinct is evident in the track listing order. The album is full of diverse characters in which Clark tells stories which manage to be dramatic, humorous, heartfelt and down right honest in which she examines and celebrates her characters. Describing her songs, Randy Lewis from the Los Angeles Times wrote: "find this record and listen to a dozen dazzlingly witty and insightful takes on the struggles of the working class ("Pray to Jesus"), neglected and/or mistreated women ("Crazy Women," "The Day She Got Divorced"), the battle between right and wrong ("What'll Keep Me Out of Heaven") and the pros and cons of chemical mood enhancers" ("Hungover," "Get High").

"I think my music is a dark comedy, just as I think life is a dark comedy," said Brandy. "The truth is funny sometimes. I don't ever want to come across as corny or novelty, but you have to laugh at things. I feel like this record is about what's really going on in life." "I get my inspiration from real people who are just surviving their lives and getting through their days. That's who I write songs for," she explained.

The song "Stripes" was co-written with Shane McAnally at a songwriters retreat at Center Hill Lake. It was released in America as a single which premiered on Sirius XM Holdings. The official video made its CMT debut on July 4, 2013. The release of the album coincides with a breakthrough year for Clark after being named as one of CMT's Next Women of Country and gaining well-deserved attention after scoring a CMA Song of the Year nomination for her contribution to "Mama’s Broken Heart" and enjoying chart-topping success as a writer of The Band Perry's No.1 song "Better Dig Two."

== Critical reception ==
Professional ratings
Aggregate scores
Source	Rating
Metacritic	89/100
Review scores
Source	Rating
AllMusic	5/5 stars
American Songwriter	4/5 stars
Cuepoint	A−
Entertainment Weekly	B+
The Irish Times	4/5 stars
Los Angeles Times	3.5/4 stars
Nash Country Weekly	A+
Rolling Stone	3.5/5 stars
Roughstock	5/5 stars
Spin	8/10

12 Stories received highly positive reviews from music critics. At Metacritic, which assigns a normalized rating out of 100 to reviews from mainstream critics, the album has an average score of 89 out of 100, which indicates "universal acclaim" based on 6 reviews.

Regarding Clark's writing, Stephen Thomas Erlewine of AllMusic commented, "She's on the outside but she's an observer, not an outcast, noticing the quirks and eccentricities of her brethren instead of diving head-on into their madness" and describing her singing said, "she avoids full-throated showstoppers for something better: she's sly and strong, mining heartbreak and sneaking in punch lines at unexpected times" and that the "strength and clarity" of Clark's voice becomes undeniable. He concludes "the superb 12 Stories showcases a unique artist who stands firmly, proudly on her own merits"

At American Songwriter, Jonathan Bernstein noted the simplicity of the album title "gives a good sense of Clark's direct, plain-spoken, songwriting" and that her debut was "a welcome, engrossing respite from the party-fueled escapism that's dominated Music City throughout the summer of 2013" Jon Freeman of Country Weekly described the set as "a staggeringly great collection of original tunes that paint vivid, honest portraits of real life, from a uniquely feminine perspective"

Grady Smith of Entertainment Weekly noted that Clark "keeps things edgy, singing about divorce, drugs, jail, and Jesus—a.k.a. country music’s Golden Quadrangle, with matter-of-fact sass and ample twang"

Will Hermes, writing for Rolling Stone, concludes that Brandy's ear "is unerring and her characters true" describing her as " the kind of talent who makes the term "alt-country" unnecessary"

At Roughstock, Matt Bjorke said Clark possesses a voice "that recalls Mary Chapin Carpenter, Suzy Bogguss, Kathy Mattea and Trisha Yearwood" and described her as "a unique talent in that she writes songs that are classic and contemporary all at the same time" and that 12 Stories is "one of the strongest albums of 2013 and of any album released in this new century".

Billboard writer Chuck Dauphin began his review with one word, "Wow", and clarified, "I don’t think I have ever started a review so simply in my decade-plus of writing them. But, sometimes, you can say a lot more with less than you can otherwise". He said that Clark has assembled an album that potentially will "stand beside such landmark female collections" as Lee Ann Womack's 2005 released There's More Where That Came From and Reba McEntire's 1996 album Whoever's in New England. He described the single, "Stripes", as having "a modern day Loretta Lynn twist" and that perhaps the coolest line of any song during 2013 is "There’s no crime of passion worth a crime of fashion"

Jody Rosen from New York Magazine declared "12 Stories Is My Favorite Album of 2013."

In the January 2014 issue of leading UK country music publication Country Music People, editor Duncan Warwick made it his "5 Star CD of the Month", summing up with "Every song tells a story and Brandy Clark makes them all riveting. Now I have to remove an album from my best of the year to make room for this."

== Commercial performance ==
12 Stories debuted at No. 197 on the Billboard 200 and at No. 28 on the Billboard Top Country Albums chart with 2,000 copies sold in its first week of release. It re-entered the Billboard 200 at a new peak of 163 for the chart dated December 7, 2013, and also peaked at the Top Country Album chart at No. 23. The album has sold 46,000 copies in the U.S. as of February 2015.

== Track listing ==
All tracks are written by Brandy Clark, with additional co-writers as noted.

12 Stories track listing
No.	Title	Writer(s)	Length
1.	"Pray to Jesus"	Shane McAnally	3:22
2.	"Crazy Women"	McAnally; Jessie Jo Dillon	3:37
3.	"What'll Keep Me Out of Heaven"	Mark Stephen Jones	3:34
4.	"Get High"		3:31
5.	"Hold My Hand"	Jones	3:36
6.	"Stripes"	McAnally; Matt Jenkins	3:16
7.	"In Some Corner"	Trent Jeffcoat	3:38
8.	"Take a Little Pill"	McAnally; Mark D. Sanders	3:29
9.	"Hungover"	McAnally; Dillon	3:56
10.	"Illegitimate Children"	Deanna Walker	3:21
11.	"The Day She Got Divorced"	McAnally; Sanders	3:23
12.	"Just Like Him"	McAnally; Dillon	3:31
Total length:			42:14

== Personnel ==
Credits adapted from the liner notes of 12 Stories.

=== Musicians ===
- Brandy Clark – acoustic guitar, lead vocals
- Dave Brainard – acoustic guitar, percussion, mandolin, bass guitar, keyboards
- Marco Giovino – drums
- Harry Stinson – drums
- Gregg Lohman – drums (track 10)
- Byron House – bass guitar, upright bass
- Tim Marks – bass guitar (tracks 2,7,12)
- Chris Donahue – upright bass (tracks 4,10)
- Will Doughty – piano, keyboards
- Rob McNelly – electric guitar
- Tim Teague – B-Bender Guitar (track 3)
- Chris Leuzinger – electric guitar (track 7)
- Smith Curry – lap steel guitar
- Bruce Bouton – steel guitar (track 7)
- Dan Dugmore – Dobro (tracks 2,4)
- Sweepy Walker – harmonica, percussion
- John Deaderick – accordion (track 1)

- Megan Mullins – violin (track 1)
- Jason Fitz – violin (tracks 8,11,12)
- Carol Rabinowitz – cello
- Jimmy Nichols – keyboard, strings (tracks 5,7)
- Vince Gill – vocals
- Kacey Musgraves – vocals
- Shane McAnally – background vocals
- Ray Scott – background vocals
- Bonnie Baker – background vocals
- Tiffany Goss – background vocals
- Josh Osborne – background vocals

=== Technical ===
- Dave Brainard – record producer, overdubs, editing, mixing
- Brian Kolb – mixing
- Eric Conn – mastering
- Don Cobb – mastering

Tracked by Brian Kolb at Ben Fold's Studio Nashville TN (assisted by Leslie Richter)

== Charts ==
Chart performance for 12 Stories
Chart (2013)	Peak
US Billboard 200	163
US Top Country Albums (Billboard)	23
US Heatseekers Albums (Billboard)	2
US Independent Albums (Billboard)	22
UK Country Albums Chart (OCC)	10
