= Jen Foster =

American singer-songwriter

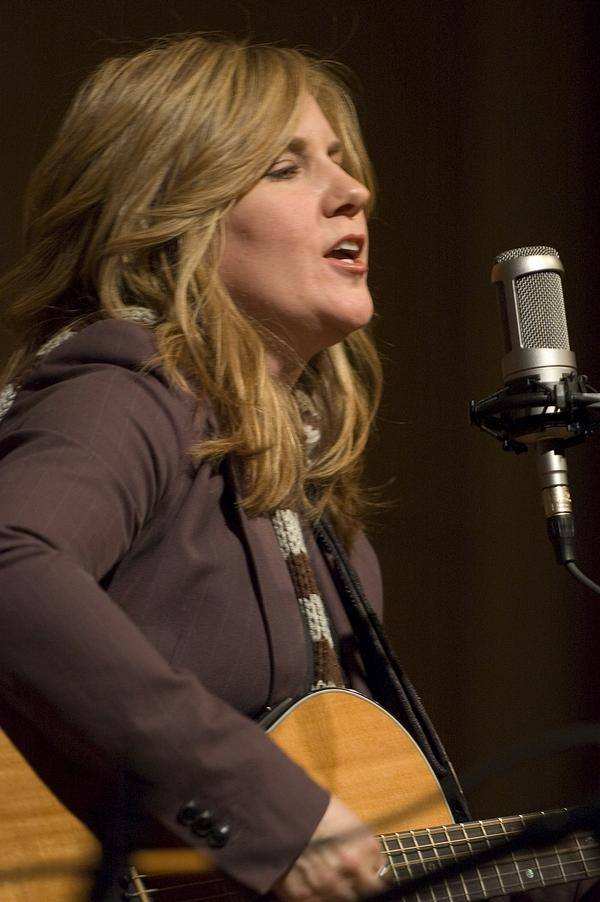
- Jen Foster performing at the Writer's Block in Knoxville, Tennessee, in 2009.

Background information
- Origin: Houston, Texas, US
- Genre: Pop
- Occupation: Musician
- Instrument: Vocals
- Years active: 2001–present
- Label: Fosterchild Records
- Website: jenfoster.com

Jennifer Kate Foster is an American singer-songwriter, musician, performer, record producer, and owner of record label Fosterchild Records. Her music incorporates elements of rock, pop, R&B, folk, country, and dance. She has released three studio albums, three EPs and has contributed to various film, television and multi-media soundtracks and exceeded sales of 50,000 units as an independent artist.

Foster has garnered a number of awards for her songwriting skills and has written with a number Nashville, Tennessee Music Row hit songwriter's including Pam Tillis ("Mi Vida Loca", "Spilled Perfume"), Jeffrey Steele ("What Hurts The Most", "My Wish"), Natalie Hemby ("Only Prettier", "White Liar"), Liz Rose ("Teardrops on My Guitar"), Mike Reid ("I Can't Make You Love Me"), Kristen Hall of Sugarland ("Baby Girl", "Stay"), Greg Barnhill ("Walkaway Joe"), Keith Follesé ("Smile", "Lookin' for a Good Time", "I Love You"), Rob Giles (The Rescues), and Emily West ("I Hate You, I Love You", "Blue Sky").

== Early life ==
Jen Foster grew up in a suburban neighborhood in Houston, Texas. Her father is a successful Texas businessman and her mother was a housewife and an antiques dealer who died from endometrial cancer in 2008. Foster began playing the guitar at the age of eight, wrote her first song at sixteen, and won a number of talent contests at Duchesne Academy, the Catholic girls high school she attended. Foster says "I was a fan of thought-provoking lyrics." Her early influences included James Taylor, Joni Mitchell, Jackson Brown, and Bob Dylan. After moving to Los Angeles to go to Whittier College she graduated in 1992 with a degree in English and a minor in Music. Foster's first performances were at coffee houses and clubs including the Whisky a Go Go and The Troubadour. After working a few odd jobs including a receptionist for the luggage company Ricardo of Beverly Hills, she decided that she wanted to move back South. Foster also wanted to live in a strong community of songwriters so she moved to Nashville, Tennessee.

== Career ==
In 2003, Foster recorded her first official CD release, Everybody's Girl. With the help of an investor and a small team of industry professionals they put together the first incarnation of her independent record label called American Garage Records. Foster began touring the United States playing colleges, clubs and radio stations and implemented a street team, allowing her to mobilize her fan base.

In 2006, The Underdogs her second official release came out, and was even more well-received than the first project. On The Underdogs, Foster worked with Jeff Trott, who is best known for his extensive work with Sheryl Crow, as her guitar player, co-writer, and co-producer. Several songs on that project won some respectable songwriting awards and opportunities for film and television placements were coming in as well. In 2008, the second incarnation of her label Fosterchild Records, was born and her first official release under Fosterchild was an EP featuring the single "Closer To Nowhere". Foster made her first video for the song which quickly went to No. 1 on the LOGO channel and stayed on their Top 10 list forsix6 months. "Closer To Nowhere" was also featured in MTV'S The Hills. The full CD project, Thirty-Nine, was released in 2009 and produced by Greg Droman. This project featured some of Foster's favorite musicians: Peter Stroud (Sheryl Crow's guitar player), Rami Jaffee (Keyboard player for the Foo Fighters and The Wallflowers), Sean Hurley (Bass for John Mayer, Vertical Horizon), and Fred Eltringham (The Wallflowers, Dixie Chicks, Wreckers).

At the same time the CD was being recorded Foster's mother began her battle with cancer and over those next few years Foster was called to spend a lot of time with her mother and family. It was at this time that Foster wrote the song inspired by her mother "The Least I Can Do". In 2009, Foster was invited by Bart Herbison to be the artist/writer representative on the board at Nashville Songwriters Association International (NSAI). This board consists of some of the most successful songwriters in music: Jessi Alexander ("The Climb", Miley Cyrus), Rivers Rutherford ("Homewrecker", Gretchen Wilson), Danny Wells ("Check Yes Or No", George Strait), Clay Mills ("Don't Think I Don't Think About It", Darius Rucker), Byron Hill ("Fool Hearted Memory", George Strait), Steve Bogard ("Damn Your Eyes", Etta James), and many others. Through her work with NSAI, Foster travelled to Washington, D.C. to fight for the rights and fair compensation which songwriters are entitled to. Foster performed some her original compositions for Barbara Boxer, Jim Cooper, Lamar Alexander, and other members of Congress and the Senate, in an effort to remind them the value of a song.

Foster released the single "I Didn't Just Kiss Her", a tongue-in-cheek response to Katy Perry's hit "I Kissed a Girl". Despite the controversial subject Foster said the reaction to her single has been "surprisingly, overwhelmingly positive" although a few people have e-mailed her expressing their offense.

2009 was also the year that Foster's song "Venice Beach" was chosen to be the theme song for the popular web series Venice, which is a spin-off from the CBS soap opera The Guiding Light. Other original songs by Foster, including "She", "I'm in Love With You", and "I Can't Believe", were regularly featured in the series. Thousands of new fans have embraced Foster's music as a result of this placement. In 2011 the series won an Emmy for Best Daytime Short Format.

Foster is constantly writing, co-writing, and recording new songs. Creating demo's of country songs in Nashville to pitch to major country artists, travels to Los Angeles regularly to write and record new songs for pop pitches as well as for film/TV pitches. Foster has had songs on hold in Nashville with Faith Hill, Wynonna Judd, Rascal Flatts, Rodney Atkins, and Lee Brice. In 2012 Foster released a new artist project, You Stayed, which is a compilation of a lot of the recordings she did in Los Angeles with co-producer, Rich Jacques and dedicated to her fans for their dedication and continue supported. She co-wrote the title track with songwriter/producer and Nashville Star judge, Jeffrey Steele.

2012 also saw Foster assemble a new Fosterchild Records team, start speaking at conferences about how she has marketed her music and built my fan base independently. Foster was the keynote speaker, along with Ashley Capps of Bonaroo, at the Indiegirl Conference in Knoxville, Tennessee, spoke to a crowd of 350 people for Tin Pan South at the Millennium Hotel in Nashville and at Belmont University's "Best Job Ever" event in September 2012.

Foster has hosted three songwriter events since 2009 called "The Writer's Share", to benefit the TJ Martell Foundation for Leukemia, Cancer, and AIDS Research. This event has typically been held at the Bluebird Cafe, and has featured Richard Marx, Keb' Mo, and many other well-loved hit songwriters, such as Mike Reid ("I Can't Make You Love Me", Bonnie Raitt) and Chuck Cannon ("I Love The Way You Love Me", John Michael Montgomery). Her mother, Mary Alice, was the inspiration behind this event.

== Film and television ==
Foster's music has appeared in:

- Venice: The Series (Emmy Award-winning web series) – "Venice Beach" by Jen Foster
- Elena Undone (feature film) – "Broken" – by Jen Foster and "She" by Jen Foster
- MTV's The Hills (Season 5). – "Closer To Nowhere" by Jen Foster
- ABC's All My Children. (TV series) – "I Just Wanna Be Happy" by Jen Foster & Kathy Scott
- American Pie Presents: Beta House. (feature film) – "All This Time" by Jen Foster
- HBO Happenstance (short film) – "The One Who Go Away" Jen Foster & Glenn Rosenstein
- Girl Play (feature film) – "She" by Jen Foster

== Awards ==
- 2001 Great American Songwriting Contest, Pop category, Winner for "She".
- 2006 OUT Music Awards, Song of the Year for "The Underdogs".
- 2005 2nd Annual International Acoustic Music Awards (IAMA), Overall Grand Prize for "Taking Bob Dylan".
- 2007 International Songwriting Competition, Adult Album Alternative category, First place for "Closer To Nowhere".
- John Lennon Songwriting Contest
- Independent Singer/Songwriter Awards
- LOGO Channel – Best of 2008
- Stand Out Awards
- USA Songwriting Contest
- Nashville Song & Lyric Contest
- 2012 RightOutTV Best Pop Rock Adult Contemporary Award "You Stayed"

== Discography ==
=== Studio albums ===
- 1995: Oath
- 2001: Ordinary Girl
- 2003: Everybody's Girl
- 2006: The Underdogs
- 2009: Thirty-Nine
- 2015: The White Room Sessions 2009-2015

=== EPs ===
- 2005: Songs from The Underdogs
- 2008: Songs from Thirty-Nine
- 2012: You Stayed
