= 2010 Country Music Association Awards =

Annual US music awards ceremony

- Date: November 10, 2010
- Location: Bridgestone Arena, Nashville, Tennessee, U.S.
- Hosted by: Brad Paisley; Carrie Underwood

Highlights
- Most wins: Miranda Lambert (3)
- Most nominations: Miranda Lambert (9)

Television/radio coverage
- Network: ABC

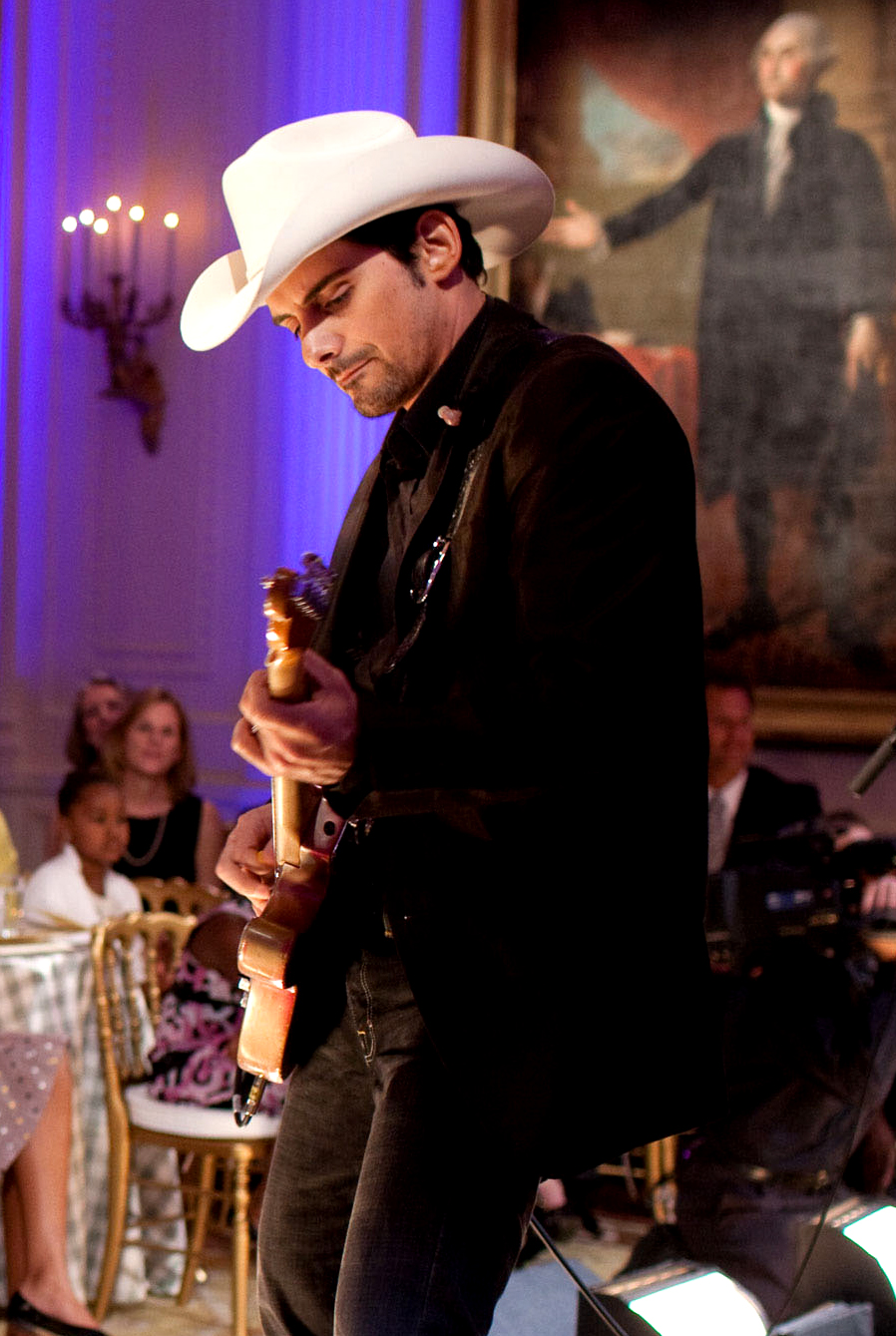
Brad Paisley, Entertainer of the Year recipient.

The 2010 Country Music Association Awards, 44th Annual Ceremony, is a music award ceremony that was held on November 10, 2010, at the Bridgestone Arena in Nashville, Tennessee and the show was hosted for the third time by Brad Paisley and Carrie Underwood.

== Background ==
Miranda Lambert was the lead nominee with 9 total. Lambert broke a record for most CMA nominations ever received by a female artist in a single year.

== Winners and nominees ==
Winners are shown in bold.

Entertainer of the Year	Album of the Year
**Brad Paisley**; Lady Antebellum; Miranda Lambert; Keith Urban; Zac Brown Band	**Revolution** **— Miranda Lambert**; Need You Now — Lady Antebellum; Play On — Carrie Underwood; Twang — George Strait; Up on the Ridge — Dierks Bentley
Male Vocalist of the Year	Female Vocalist of the Year
**Blake Shelton**; Dierks Bentley; Brad Paisley; George Strait; Keith Urban	**Miranda Lambert**; Martina McBride; Reba McEntire; Taylor Swift; Carrie Underwood
Vocal Group of the Year	Vocal Duo of the Year
**Lady Antebellum**; Little Big Town; Rascal Flatts; The Band Perry; Zac Brown Band	**Sugarland**; Brooks & Dunn; Joey + Rory; Montgomery Gentry; Steel Magnolia
Single of the Year	Song of the Year (Songwriters' Award)
**"Need You Now"** — **Lady Antebellum**; "A Little More Country Than That" — Easton Corbin; "Hillbilly Bone" — Blake Shelton and Trace Adkins; "The House That Built Me" — Miranda Lambert; "White Liar" — Miranda Lambert	**"The House That Built Me" — Tom Douglas and Allen Shamblin**; "A Little More Country Than That" — Rory Lee Feek, Don Poythress and Wynn Varble; "Need You Now" — Dave Haywood, Charles Kelley, Hillary Scott and Josh Kear; "Toes" — Zac Brown, Wyatt Durrette III, John Driskell Hopkins and Shawn Mullins; "White Liar" — Miranda Lambert and Natalie Hemby
New Artist of the Year	Musician of the Year
**Zac Brown Band**; Luke Bryan; Easton Corbin; Jerrod Niemann; Chris Young	**Mac McAnally**; Paul Franklin; Dan Huff; Brent Mason; Randy Scruggs
Music Video of the Year	Musical Event of the Year
**"The House That Built Me"** — **Miranda Lambert; (Dir. Trey Fanjoy)**; "Hillbilly Bone" — Blake Shelton feat. Trace Adkins; (Dir. Roman White); "Need You Now" — Lady Antebellum; (Dir. David McClister); "Water" — Brad Paisley; (Dir. Jim Shea); "White Liar" — Miranda Lambert; (Dir. Chris Hicky)	**"Hillbilly Bone"** — **Blake Shelton and Trace Adkins**; "Bad Angel" — Dierks Bentley, Miranda Lambert and Jamey Johnson; "Can't You See" — Zac Brown Band and Kid Rock; "I'm Alive" — Kenny Chesney and Dave Matthews; "Till the End" — Alan Jackson and Lee Ann Womack

== Performers ==
Artist(s)	Song(s)
Carrie Underwood; Brad Paisley; Keith Urban	"Songs Like This"
Rascal Flatts	"Why Wait"
Blake Shelton	"All About Tonight"
Miranda Lambert	"That’s The Way The World Goes ‘Round"
George Strait	"The Breath You Take"
Zac Brown Band; Alan Jackson	"As She’s Walking Away"
Kenny Chesney	"The Boys of Fall"
Taylor Swift	"Back to December"
Sugarland	"Stuck Like Glue"
Keith Urban	"Put You in a Song"
Reba McEntire	"If I Were a Boy"
Jason Aldean; Kelly Clarkson	"Don't You Wanna Stay"
Brad Paisley	"This Is Country Music"
Lady A	"Hello World"
Kid Rock	"Born Free"
Carrie Underwood	"Mama’s Song"
Dierks Bentley	"Up On the Ridge"
Miranda Lambert; Sheryl Crow; Loretta Lynn	"Coal Miner’s Daughter"
Vince Gill; Gwyneth Paltrow	"Country Strong"

== Presenters ==
Presenter(s)	Award
Ty Pennington and LeAnn Rimes	Single of the Year
Luke Bryan and Kellie Pickler	Song of the Year
Darius Rucker	New Artist of the Year
Little Big Town	Album of the Year
Jeff Gordon and Joanna Garcia	Vocal Duo of the Year
Chris Young, Sara Evans, Easton Corbin	Vocal Group of the Year
Martina McBride	Male Vocalist of the Year
Sissy Spacek	Female Vocalist of the Year
Tim McGraw	Entertainer of the Year
