= Thomas Rhett (EP) =

EP by Thomas Rhett
- Released: August 28, 2012
- Recorded: 2011–12
- Genre: Country
- Length: 17:40
- Label: Valory
- Producer: Jay Joyce

Thomas Rhett chronology
| Thomas Rhett (2012) | It Goes Like This (2013) |

Singles from Thomas Rhett
- 1. "Something to Do with My Hands" Released: February 21, 2012; 2. "Beer with Jesus" Released: September 4, 2012

Cover for the acoustic version

Thomas Rhett is the self-titled debut EP from American country music singer Thomas Rhett. The EP was released on August 28, 2012, and ranked No. 3 on the Billboard Top Heatseekers chart.

== Track listing ==
=== Regular version ===
| No. | Title | Writer(s) | Length |
|---|---|---|---|
| 1. | "Something to Do with My Hands" | Thomas Rhett; Lee Thomas Miller; Chris Stapleton | 3:20 |
| 2. | "Beer with Jesus" | Rhett; Rick Huckaby; Lance Miller | 4:13 |
| 3. | "Front Porch Junkies" | Rhett; Brad Warren; Brett Warren; Mark Irwin; Josh Kear | 3:25 |
| 4. | "Whatcha Got in That Cup" | Rhett; Rhett Akins; Craig Wiseman | 2:55 |
| 5. | "Make Me Wanna" | Rhett; Bart Butler; Larry McCoy | 3:47 |
| Total length: | | | 17:40 |

=== Acoustic version ===
| No. | Title | Length |
|---|---|---|
| 1. | "Whatcha Got in That Cup" | 2:48 |
| 2. | "Beer with Jesus" | 4:02 |
| 3. | "Something to Do with My Hands" | 3:12 |
| 4. | "I Ain't Ready to Quit" | 3:37 |
| 5. | "Tobacco" | 3:14 |
| 6. | "Front Porch Junkies" | 3:41 |
| Total length: | | 20:34 |

== Chart performance ==
| Chart (2012) | Peak position |
|---|---|
| US Billboard 200 | 133 |
| US Top Country Albums (Billboard) | 24 |
| US Heatseekers Albums (Billboard) | 3 |
