= Pain Killer (Little Big Town song) =

Single by Little Big Town

from the album Pain Killer
- Released: August 24, 2015
- Genre: Country pop; reggae
- Length: 3:11
- Label: Capitol Nashville
- Songwriters: Karen Fairchild; Jimi Westbrook; Blair Daly; Hillary Lindsey
- Producer: Jay Joyce

Little Big Town singles chronology
"Smokin' and Drinkin'" (2015)	"Pain Killer" (2015)	"Take Me Down" (2016)

Music video
- "Pain Killer" on YouTube

"Pain Killer" is a song recorded by American country music group Little Big Town for their sixth studio album of the same name (2014). It was written by group members Karen Fairchild and Jimi Westbrook along with Blair Daly and Hillary Lindsey, with Fairchild being featured on lead vocals. The song was serviced to American country radio on August 24, 2015 as the album's third official single.

== Content ==
"Pain Killer" is a mid-tempo reggae-influenced country song about using loved ones, rather than drugs or alcohol, to get through difficult times. Group member Karen Fairchild performs lead vocals on the song, as on previous Pain Killer singles "Day Drinking" and "Girl Crush".

== Critical reception ==
An uncredited review for Taste of Country praised the song as "a credit to strong songwriting and a strong bond between the four bandmates."

== Music video ==
The official music video for "Pain Killer" was filmed on location Jost Van Dyke in the British Virgin Islands, including the Soggy Dollar Bar, which is the birthplace of the Painkiller drink that shares its name with the song and its parent album. Directed by Roger Pistole, the video premiered August 23, 2015. The video features the band members letting loose at beach bars (including the Soggy Dollar) in formal wear and also features shots of the quartet performing underwater.

== Chart performance ==
Chart (2015–2016)	Peak position
Canada Country (Billboard)	35
US Country Airplay (Billboard)	38
US Hot Country Songs (Billboard)	49
