= It Goes Like This (disambiguation) =

It Goes Like This is a 2013 album by Thomas Rhett.

It Goes Like This may also refer to:

- It Goes Like This, an album by Scott Krippayne.
- "It Goes Like This", a collaboration with the band Sixwire from Pictures (John Michael Montgomery album).
- "It Goes Like This" (song), a song by Thomas Rhett
