= Girl Crush =

Single by Little Big Town

from the album Pain Killer
- Released: December 15, 2014
- Genre: Country; blue-eyed soul
- Length: 3:13
- Label: Capitol Nashville
- Songwriters: Lori McKenna; Hillary Lindsey; Liz Rose
- Producer: Jay Joyce

Little Big Town singles chronology
"Day Drinking" (2014)	"Girl Crush" (2014)	"Smokin' and Drinkin'" (2015)

"Girl Crush" is a song written by Lori McKenna, Hillary Lindsey and Liz Rose, and performed by American country music group Little Big Town. It was released on December 15, 2014 as the second single from their sixth studio album, Pain Killer. The song received mostly positive reviews from music critics, won five music awards, including two Grammys (Best Country Duo/Group Performance and Best Country Song), reaching number 3 on the Country Airplay charts and number one on the Hot Country Songs chart, ended up being the second-most played song of 2015 on the format, and is certified seven-times Platinum in the US.

== Content ==
As CMT's Alison Bonaguro wrote, the song is "about a girl obsessing over another girl because that girl stole her lover ... On the other hand, it could also be about a girl obsessing over the girl who is with the man that she wants but has never had." Bonaguro added that it is not a girl crush (on another girl) per se, but rather a girl desiring to taste her rival's lips in order to taste him and "to drown in her perfume, to have her long blond hair — and so on — all in an effort to get him back".

Lori McKenna stated that when she presented the idea to co-writer Liz Rose that Rose disliked the idea at first but that Rose changed her mind after hearing the first verse that Hillary Lindsey had written. Group members Kimberly Schlapman and Karen Fairchild heard the song and asked that it be saved for them.

=== Composition ===
"Girl Crush" is in the key of C major and a 6/8 time signature, with an approximate tempo of 58 dotted quarter notes per minute and a primary chord pattern of C–Em–F–G. Karen Fairchild's lead vocals range from G_{3} to A_{4}.

== Critical reception ==
"Girl Crush" received critical acclaim. CMT's Alison Bonaguro writes, "If anyone knows how to write a country song that's never been written before, it's these three": Lori McKenna, Hillary Lindsey, and Liz Rose. Billy Dukes of Taste of Country states, "Karen Fairchild's lead on Little Big Town's new single 'Girl Crush' may be the best vocal performance of the year. Her anguish drives through you like a steam engine, and afterward she's nothing but a puff of white smoke barely holding on to existence." Dukes adds, "listen to the song on repeat and find yourself exhausted … in the best possible way" and "mass homogeny on the radio makes it seem impossible to create a sound or write a song that's truly unique. It's as if all the good ideas have been used up. Little Big Town prove this is not the case on each album they release."

In 2024, Rolling Stone ranked the song at No. 80 on its 200 Greatest Country Songs of All Time ranking.

=== Awards and nominations ===
Year	Association	Category	Result
2015	Country Music Association Awards	Song of the Year	Won
2015	Country Music Association Awards	Single of the Year	Won
2015	Country Music Association Awards	Music Video of the Year	Nominated
2016	Grammy Awards	Best Country Duo/Group Performance	Won
2016	Grammy Awards	Song of the Year	Nominated
2016	Grammy Awards	Best Country Song	Won
2016	Academy of Country Music	Single Record of the Year	Nominated
2016	Academy of Country Music	Song of the Year	Nominated
2016	Academy of Country Music	Video of the Year	Nominated
2016	CMT Music Awards	Group/Duo Video of the Year ^{[A]}	Won
2016	CMT Music Awards	CMT Performance of the Year ^{[B]}	Nominated

A "Girl Crush" as performed by Little Big Town.

B "Girl Crush" as performed by Adam Lambert and Leona Lewis was nominated as 2016 CMT Performance of the Year for their rendition of the song on the "CMT Artists of the Year" TV special on December 2, 2015. Their performance was in honor of Little Big Town in recognition of CMT's selection of the group as a "CMT Artist of the Year."

== Commercial performance ==
"Girl Crush" debuted at number 48 on the Billboard Hot Country Songs chart for the week ending November 8, 2014, before it was released as a single. It reached number one and remained there for thirteen consecutive weeks until it was knocked off by "Kick the Dust Up" by Luke Bryan. It debuted at number 55 on Billboard's Country Airplay chart for the week ending December 27, 2014. "Girl Crush" sold 10,000 copies in its debut week of November 8, 2014. The song reached more than two million in sales by early February 2016. As of November 2019, "Girl Crush" had sold 2,550,000 copies in the United States. In March 2025, the single was certified 7× multi-Platinum.

"Girl Crush" is Little Big Town's highest charting single on Billboard's all-genre Hot 100 chart, having peaked at number 18 for the week ending May 9, 2015 chart, besting the number 22 peak of "Pontoon" in 2012. It is also their highest showing on the Canadian Hot 100, besting the number 39 position of "Pontoon" in 2012. It is also their longest-running number one single, 13 weeks atop Hot Country Songs. It broke the record set by The Browns' 1959 hit "The Three Bells" as the longest-running number one on the Billboard Hot Country Songs chart by a group of three or more members.

Some radio stations were reported to have pulled "Girl Crush" from their playlists, in response to concerns from listeners who interpreted the song to be about lesbianism. In response, Fairchild said, "That's just shocking to me, the close-mindedness of that, when that's just not what the song was about…But what if it were? It's just a greater issue of listening to a song for what it is." In addition, the label created a short commercial in which the band discusses the song and its actual meaning. Billboard consulted several radio program directors on its panel and found only one who detailed a specific complaint from a listener; the magazine concluded that the controversy surrounding the song was mostly fabricated.

== Music video ==
The music video is in black-and-white. It was directed by Karla and Matthew Welch and premiered in April 2015. The music video was filmed in Los Angeles, California and produced by Meritocracy Inc. The music video is nominated for a 2016 Academy of Country Music Award for Video of the Year.

== Live performances ==
- February 2015 – The Ellen DeGeneres Show
- March 2015 – The Tonight Show Starring Jimmy Fallon
- April 2015 – The 50th Annual ACM Awards
- May 2015 – Billboard Music Awards with Faith Hill
- November 2015 – CMA Awards
- February 2016—Grammy Awards

== Meghan Linsey version ==
On the April 13, 2015 episode (Season 8) of The Voice, contestant Meghan Linsey (formerly one-half of Steel Magnolia) performed the song. Country singer Blake Shelton, who is a judge on the show, said that the song was his favorite on the radio at that point. Reba McEntire, who served as a mentor on the episode, also reacted favorably to Linsey's rendition. Linsey's version peaked at number 22 on the Billboard Hot Country Songs chart and number 1 on Bubbling Under Hot 100 Singles.

== Charts ==
=== Weekly charts ===
Chart (2014–2015)	Peak position
Canada Hot 100 (Billboard)	29
Canada Country (Billboard)	11
US Billboard Hot 100	18
US Hot Country Songs (Billboard)	1
US Country Airplay (Billboard)	3
US Adult Contemporary (Billboard)	29
US Adult Pop Airplay (Billboard)	23

=== Year-end charts ===
Chart (2015)	Position
Canada (Canadian Hot 100)	85
US Billboard Hot 100	63
US Country Airplay (Billboard)	38
US Hot Country Songs (Billboard)	2

=== Decade-end charts ===
Chart (2010–2019)	Position
US Hot Country Songs (Billboard)	21

== Certifications ==
Region	Certification	Certified units/sales
New Zealand (RMNZ)	Gold	15,000^{‡}
United Kingdom (BPI)	Silver	200,000^{‡}
United States (RIAA)	7× Platinum	7,000,000^{‡}
^{‡} Sales+streaming figures based on certification alone.
