= Puxico =

Puxico may refer to:

- Puxico, Missouri, in Stoddard County, Missouri
- Puxico (album), album by Natalie Hemby
