= Tin Pan South Songwriters Festival =

- Location: Nashville, Tennessee
- Years active: 1993–present
- Website: tinpansouth.com

The Tin Pan South Songwriters Festival is an annual festival of songwriters in Nashville, Tennessee. It was established by the 4,000-member Nashville Songwriters Association International (NSAI) in 1993. It is typically a five-day session for songwriters including nights of "songwriter in the round" shows held at 10 or so venues around the city, usually Nashville's top singer/songwriter hotspots. According to Tennessean writer Dave Paulson, the festival allows country music's rising stars to take the stage alongside their closest collaborators. The festival is not about country music per se — it includes all genres of music, and features both professional and amateur composers in the U.S. and abroad. The name was derived from Tin Pan Alley, a district of Manhattan near West 28th Street, where music publishers flourished as far back as 1885. As of 2019, Tin Pan South is "the world's largest songwriter festival" according to the Nashville Convention & Visitors Corporation. Over the years, major stars have participated in Tin Pan South, including Loretta Lynn, Garth Brooks, Art Garfunkel, Carole King, and Donna Summer.

== Seminars ==
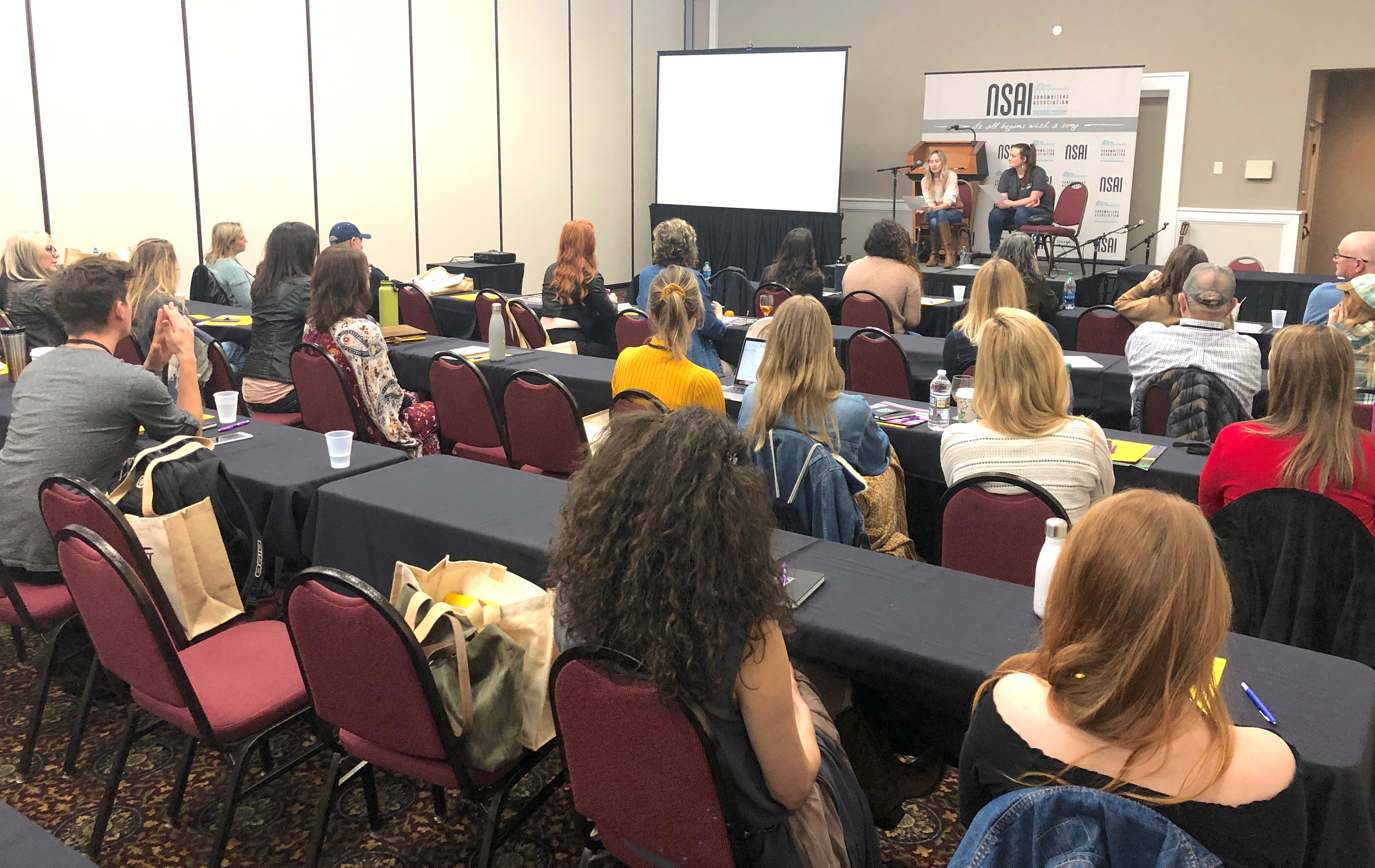
Tin Pan South songwriters seminar in Nashville, Tennessee – March, 2019

The Tin Pan South Songwriting Seminar is usually held during the Monday and Tuesday of the festival and includes keynote speakers, songwriter panels of successful composers, publisher breakout sessions and networking opportunities. Topics such as "effective co-writing" are typical, as is "dealing with rejection". Each venue has two shows per night. At a symposium, writers can get critiques of their songs. Attendees entrance fees cover most of the nightly shows, which are open to the public, but performances by top songwriters or performers at larger venues, like the Ryman Auditorium are extra.

In 2018, the keynote speakers were Kacey Musgraves and Shane McAnally. Previous speakers have been Gordon Lightfoot ("Sundown"), Merle Kilgore ("Ring of Fire") and Donna Summer ("Dim All the Lights"). The 2001 festival, for example, featured Ray Parker Jr. ("Ghostbusters") and Andrew Gold ("Thank You for Being a Friend", the theme from the NBC sitcom The Golden Girls). The festival goers are well aware of the millions of dollars that songs may earn. Speaking about the festival in 2001, BMI's Charlie Feldman said, "Songs like "This Kiss" (Faith Hill) or "I Swear" (John Michael Montgomery and All-4-One)... could generate in a year and a half or two years upward of a half-million dollars". Some of the former attendees who have gone on to writes successful songs include: Jon Vezner ("Where've You Been" – Kathy Mattea); Tia Sillers ("I Hope You Dance" – LeAnn Womack); Barry Dean ("Pontoon" – Little Big Town); and Lance Carpenter ("Love Me Like You Mean It" – Kelsea Ballerini).

== Festival sponsors ==
Sponsors of the event have included American Songwriter Magazine, Folk Alliance International, corporate donors and performing-rights organizations such as BMI, SESAC and ASCAP. NSAI Senior Director of Operations Jennifer Turnbow said, "We offer artistic reinforcement while presenting the truth about the music industry". Turnbow stated, "...one thing that has never seemed to change over the years, though, is that a well-written song is a well-written song, so I think the relevance of learning the art and craft of songwriting is timeless.”

== The Nashville Songwriters Association International ==
The NSAI is a non-profit songwriters trade association including both professional and amateur songwriters and all genres of music. The organization raises money, in part to support lobbying efforts in Washington to be advocates for fair reimbursement for songwriters, but this is not their main goal, according to Bart Herbison, former executive director. "We don't raise vast amounts of money with this [festival]", he said, "because there are a lot of costs involved...we do it to showcase the art form and the artists". In 2008, NSAI took ownership of The Bluebird Cafe, Nashville's landmark music-listening venue founded by Amy Kurland in 1982.
