= Tornado (Little Big Town song) =

2012 single by Little Big Town

Single by Little Big Town

from the album Tornado
- Released: October 1, 2012
- Genre: Country; Americana
- Length: 3:43
- Label: Capitol Nashville
- Songwriters: Natalie Hemby; Delta Maid
- Producer: Jay Joyce

Little Big Town singles chronology
"Pontoon" (2012)	"Tornado" (2012)	"Your Side of the Bed" (2013)

"Tornado" is a song recorded by American country music group Little Big Town. It was released in October 2012 as the second single from their fifth studio album, Tornado. The song was written by Natalie Hemby and Delta Maid.

== Content ==
The song is in E-flat minor with a moderate tempo and a main chord pattern of E♭m-D♭. It features lead vocals from Karen Fairchild, and uses a tornado as a metaphor for a woman's anger at her lover being unfaithful. The main accompaniment is guitars in E-flat tuning, along with a distorted bass guitar and drum loops.

Natalie Hemby wrote the song with Delta Maid, and said that the idea came when Maid asked if the area had frequent tornadoes.

== Critical reception ==
Billy Dukes of Taste of Country gave the song four and a half stars out of five, writing that "Karen Fairchild is the group’s go-to girl for attitude, and she slings it on this relentless foot-stomper that somehow still feels understated." Matt Bjorke of Roughstock gave the song a favorable review, saying that "Tornado is a lyrical gem and a downright awesome song with really interesting percussion and the vocal effects the group does are simply unmatched." Kevin John Coyne of Country Universe gave the song a B− grade, writing that "the concept is interesting, but it’s forced, with predictable imagery lifted right out of Wizard of Oz."

== Music video ==
The music video was directed by Shane Drake and premiered on October 31, 2012. It was filmed in Watertown, Tennessee and co-stars Johnathon Schaech as the object of the band's wrath.

== Chart performance ==
"Tornado" debuted at number 47 on the U.S. Billboard Hot Country Songs chart for the week of October 13, 2012. It also debuted at number 97 on the U.S. Billboard Hot 100 chart for the week of November 24, 2012, and debuted at number 88 on the Canadian Hot 100 for the week of December 15, 2012.

Chart (2012–2013)	Peak position
Canada Hot 100 (Billboard)	60
Canada Country (Billboard)	4
US Billboard Hot 100	51
US Hot Country Songs (Billboard)	6
US Country Airplay (Billboard)	2

=== Year-end charts ===
Chart (2013)	Position
US Country Airplay (Billboard)	40
US Hot Country Songs (Billboard)	42

== Certifications ==
Region	Certification	Certified units/sales
Canada (Music Canada)	Gold	40,000^{*}
United States (RIAA)	Platinum	693,000
^{*} Sales figures based on certification alone.
