= Sober (Little Big Town song) =

Single by Little Big Town

from the album Tornado
- Released: September 30, 2013
- Genre: Country
- Length: 3:15
- Label: Capitol Nashville
- Songwriters: Liz Rose; Hillary Lindsey; Lori McKenna
- Producer: Jay Joyce

Little Big Town singles chronology
| "Your Side of the Bed" (2013) | "Sober" (2013) | "Day Drinking" (2014) |

"Sober" is a song recorded by American country music group Little Big Town. It was released on September 30, 2013 as the fourth single from their fifth studio album, Tornado. The song was written by Liz Rose, Hillary Lindsey, and Lori McKenna.

== Critical reception ==
The song received a favorable review from Taste of Country, which called it "a sweet love song bathed in four-part harmonies reminiscent of the group’s most popular cuts from the mid ’00s." The review said that "Jay Joyce’s production is looser and more organic than anything else on ‘Tornado,’ which helps make sure the overall message doesn’t come out clouded." Ben Foster of Country Universe gave the song an A, writing that Kimberly Schlapman "interprets the song with poise and subtlety, bringing a sense of genuineness and humanity […] while her bandmates join in with their signature heavenly harmonies when the song comes to its chorus." Foster stated that the writers "build the ballad around an effective, accessible metaphor, elevated by a gorgeous piercing melody that lingers after the song’s end" and praised Joyce's "elegantly restrained mandolin-driven" production.

== Live performances ==
Little Big Town debuted the song on The Tonight Show with Jay Leno on September 26, 2013. They also performed it at the Country Music Association Awards on November 6, 2013.

== Music video ==
The song's music video was premiered on ABC's The Chew on February 3, 2014. It was released to Vevo February 13, 2014.

== Chart performance ==
"Sober" debuted at number 59 on the U.S. Billboard Country Airplay chart for the week of October 19, 2013. It also debuted at number 27 on the U.S. Billboard Hot Country Songs chart for the week of November 23, 2013. It also debuted at number 2 on the U.S. Billboard Bubbling Under Hot 100 Singles chart for the week of November 23, 2013.

| Chart (2013–2014) | Peak position |
|---|---|
| Canada Country (Billboard) | 35 |
| US Bubbling Under Hot 100 (Billboard) | 2 |
| US Country Airplay (Billboard) | 31 |
| US Hot Country Songs (Billboard) | 27 |

== Certifications ==
Certifications for "Sober"
| Region | Certification | Certified units/sales |
|---|---|---|
| United States (RIAA) | Gold | 500,000^{‡} |
^{‡} Sales+streaming figures based on certification alone.
