= Your Side of the Bed =

Single by Little Big Town

from the album Tornado
- Released: April 8, 2013
- Recorded: 2012
- Genre: Country
- Length: 3:41
- Label: Capitol Nashville
- Songwriters: Lori McKenna; Karen Fairchild; Jimi Westbrook; Kimberly Schlapman; Phillip Sweet
- Producer: Jay Joyce

Little Big Town singles chronology
"Tornado" (2012)	"Your Side of the Bed" (2013)	"Sober" (2013)

"Your Side of the Bed" is a song recorded by American country music group Little Big Town. It was released April 8, 2013, as the third single from their fifth studio album, Tornado. The song was written by the group alongside Lori McKenna. They debuted the song at the 2013 ACM Awards.

== Content ==
"Your Side of the Bed" is a ballad performed in duet form with lead vocals from Karen Fairchild and Jimi Westbrook. Fairchild said of the song: "I love that this lyric is so brutally honest. There are times in a relationship when you allow things to come between you, so much so that it feels like an incredibly long way back to each other. It's a lonely place to be especially when you're lying right next to someone you love."

== Critical reception ==
"Your Side of the Bed" has received many positive reviews. Billy Dukes at Taste of Country said "It’s almost uncomfortably familiar. The soft acoustic and haunting electric guitar intro mirrors the atmosphere of a bedroom weighted down by discontent," "the group said that one of their session players went as far as to ask if the married duo was doing alright, and it’s easy to see why," "perhaps the only flaw is that ‘Your Side of the Bed’ will strike too deep with some fans, making it difficult to finish," and "production by Jay Joyce makes this song one of the top singles of 2013, hands down." Daryl Addison at GAC said the song "details classic country lonesomeness with lines like, Are you sleeping with your own regret on your side of the bed?"

== Music video ==
The music video was directed by Becky Fluke and premiered in May 2013.

== Chart performance ==
"Your Side of the Bed" debuted on Billboard's Country Airplay chart at number 49 as the shot hot debut for the week of April 20, 2013, while simultaneously debuting at number 50 on Billboard's Hot Country Songs chart. As of July 24, 2013, the song has sold 200,000 copies in the United States. It also debuted at number 96 on the U.S. Billboard Hot 100 chart for the week of August 31, 2013.

Chart (2013)	Peak position
US Billboard Hot 100	96
US Country Airplay (Billboard)	27
US Hot Country Songs (Billboard)	29

=== Year-end charts ===
Chart (2013)	Position
US Country Airplay (Billboard)	99
US Hot Country Songs (Billboard)	90

== Certifications ==
Region	Certification	Certified units/sales
United States (RIAA)	Platinum	1,000,000^{‡}
^{‡} Sales+streaming figures based on certification alone.
