= Day Drinking =

Single by Little Big Town

from the album Pain Killer
- Released: June 9, 2014
- Genre: Country pop
- Length: 2:58
- Label: Capitol Nashville
- Songwriters: Karen Fairchild; Jimi Westbrook; Phillip Sweet; Troy Verges; Barry Dean
- Producer: Jay Joyce

Little Big Town singles chronology
"Sober" (2013)	"Day Drinking" (2014)	"Girl Crush" (2014)

"Day Drinking" is a song recorded by American country music group Little Big Town. It was released in June 2014 as the lead single from their sixth studio album, Pain Killer. Little Big Town debuted the song on the CMT Music Awards on June 4, 2014.

== Content ==
"Day Drinking" is a mid-tempo song about not wanting to wait until later or needing a reason to have some drinks, so the song's narrator suggests they do a little "day drinking." The song was written by three members of the band (Karen Fairchild, Phillip Sweet, and Jimi Westbrook) with Barry Dean and Troy Verges. Of the song's inception, Fairchild said: "We didn't know it really, but with 'Day Drinking,' we had a blast that day because we were drinking and writing songs. We left it alone, then a couple of weeks later, Barry Dean and Troy Verges sent us a souped up work tape of what we had done. Then, we thought this is very fun and very cool."

=== Composition ===
The song is set in the key of E Mixolydian.

== Critical reception ==
Matt Bjorke of Roughstock complimented the song's production, saying that it "benefit[s] from Joyce's strong guitar solo and percussive production tendencies which only enhance the summery good time vibes of the lyrics of 'Day Drinking.'" Bob Paxman of Country Weekly highlighted the song's "first-rate production" and vocals. He awarded the song a B+ rating, saying that while "[it] will hardly be remembered for its depth, but like a vacation cruise, it’s the perfect summer getaway."

== Music video ==
The music video for "Day Drinking" made its premiere on June 25, 2014, courtesy of People.com. It opens with the band members stuck in a traffic jam, before they get out of their vehicle, a red Cadillac convertible, and proceed to walk down the highway. Others follow suit and they all end up at a beach where fun festivities commence while alcohol beverages are consumed. Scenes for the video were shot in the Miami Beach, Florida area.

== Chart performance ==
"Day Drinking" debuted at number 32 on the U.S. Billboard Country Airplay chart and at number 22 on the U.S. Billboard Hot Country Songs chart for the week of June 21, 2014. It also debuted at number 87 on the U.S. Billboard Hot 100 chart. As of April 2015, the song has sold 671,000 copies in the United States.

Chart (2014)	Peak position
Canada Hot 100 (Billboard)	50
Canada Country (Billboard)	1
US Billboard Hot 100	40
US Country Airplay (Billboard)	2
US Hot Country Songs (Billboard)	4

=== Year-end charts ===
Chart (2014)	Position
US Country Airplay (Billboard)	29
US Hot Country Songs (Billboard)	34

== Certifications ==
Region	Certification	Certified units/sales
United States (RIAA)	2× Platinum	2,000,000^{‡}
^{‡} Sales+streaming figures based on certification alone.

== Beverage Line ==
The song's popularity led to the band creating & marketing a line of canned wine spritzers under the brand DAY DRINKING BY LITTLE BIG TOWN. The beverage comes in five flavors: Watermelon Rosé, Rosé Bubbles, Southern Peach, Black Cherry and Pontoon Punch.
