= Natalie Hemby =

American songwriter and singer

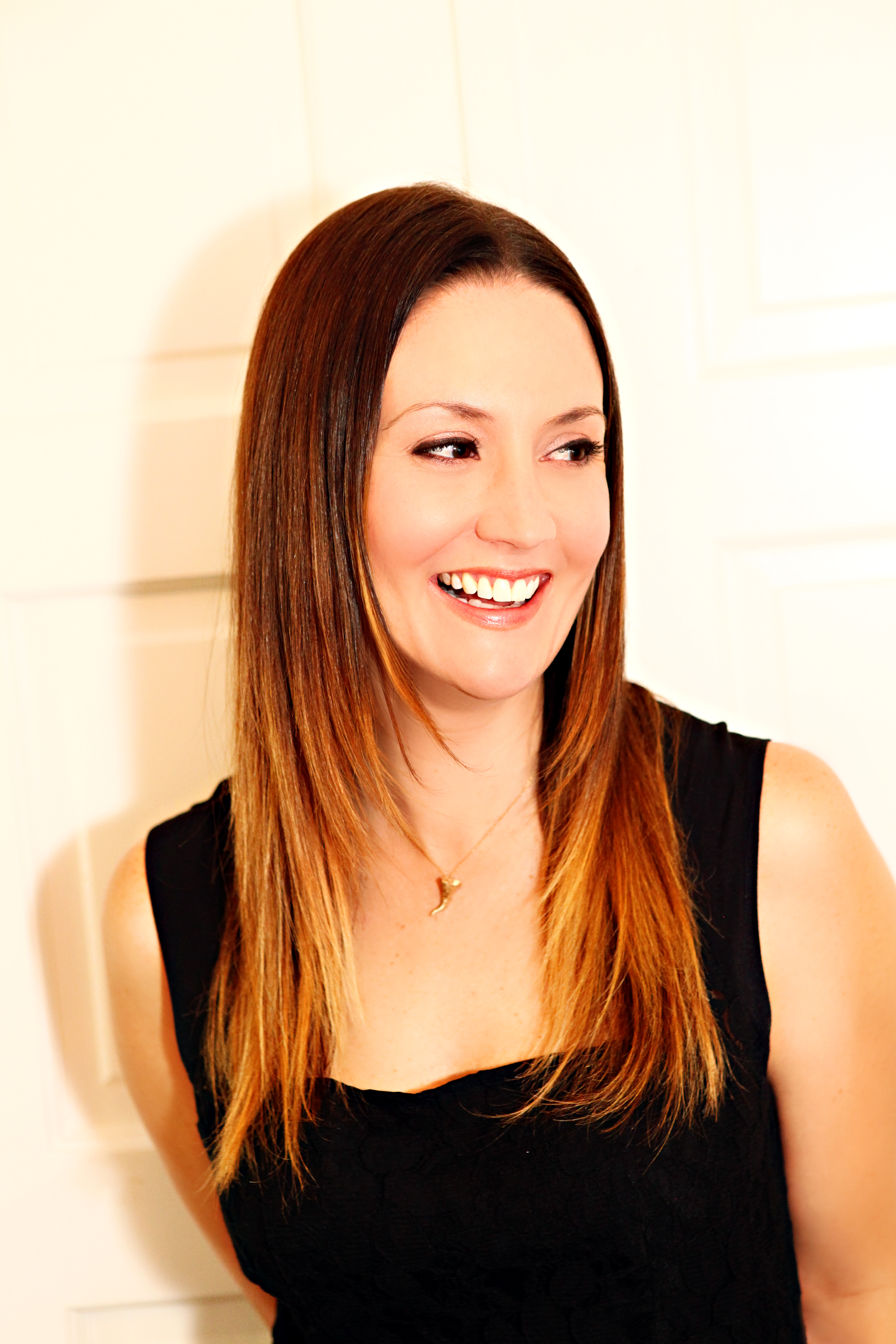
- Hemby in 2014

Background information
- Born: Natalie Nicole Hemby; March 24, 1977 (age 49); Bloomington, Illinois, U.S.
- Origin: Nashville, Tennessee, U.S.
- Genres: Country; folk
- Occupations: Singer; songwriter
- Years active: 2006-present
- Label: Fantasy
- Member of: The Highwomen
- Spouse: Mike Wrucke
- Website: nataliehemby.com

Natalie Nicole Hemby Wrucke (born March 24, 1977) is an American country music songwriter and singer. She is a two-time Grammy Awards winner. She has written songs for several country music artists, including Miranda Lambert, Little Big Town, Jon Pardi, Kacey Musgraves, Blake Shelton, Toby Keith, and pop music, working with Kelly Clarkson, Little Mix and Labrinth.

In 2018 Hemby worked with Lady Gaga and Bradley Cooper on A Star Is Born soundtrack, co-writing "Always Remember Us This Way" and "I'll Never Love Again", winning the Grammy Award for Best Song Written for Visual Media for the latter.

As a solo artist, she published two studio albums through her own label, GetWrucke Productions. In 2019, she joined the quartet The Highwomen alongside Brandi Carlile, Amanda Shires and Maren Morris.

== Early life ==
Hemby was born in Bloomington, Illinois. She is the daughter of Nashville studio guitarist Tom Hemby and Deanna Hemby.

== Career ==
=== Songwriting ===
Hemby has accumulated eight No. 1 Billboard singles during her career. Hemby's cuts include "White Liar" and "Only Prettier" by Miranda Lambert, "Pontoon" and "Tornado" by Little Big Town, "Drinks After Work" by Toby Keith and "Automatic" by Miranda Lambert. She is currently a writer at Universal Music Group Nashville (UMPG), and has formerly been affiliated with EMI Publishing and Carnival Music.

=== Solo albums ===
On January 13, 2017, Hemby released her first studio album, Puxico, named after the Missouri town where her grandfather lived, via the label GetWrucke Productions which she runs with her husband, music producer Mike Wrucke.

In February 2021, Hemby signed with Fantasy Records. Produced by Mike Wrucke, her first album on Fantasy, Pins and Needles, was released on October 8, 2021.

=== The Highwomen ===
Hemby was revealed as the final member of The Highwomen, a country music group that already featured Brandi Carlile, Maren Morris and Amanda Shires, on April 1, 2019, when the group performed live for the first time at the Bridgestone Arena as part of an 87th birthday tribute concert for Loretta Lynn. "Redesigning Women" was released on July 19, 2019, as the first single from their self-titled debut album set for release on September 6, 2019.

== Personal life ==
Hemby is married to record producer Mike Wrucke.

== Discography ==
=== Studio albums ===
==== Solo albums ====
- Puxico (2017)
- Pins and Needles (2021)

==== With The Highwomen ====
- The Highwomen (2019)

=== Songwriting ===
Year	Artist	Album	Song	Co-written with
2006	Lee Ann Womack	Call Me Crazy	"The Bees"	Daniel Tashian
2008	Eli Young Band	Jet Black & Jealous	"Mystery in the Making"	Mike Eli; James Young
2009	Miranda Lambert	Revolution	"White Liar"	Miranda Lambert
2009	Miranda Lambert	Revolution	"Only Prettier"	Miranda Lambert
2009	Miranda Lambert	Revolution	"Airstream Song"	Miranda Lambert
2009	Miranda Lambert	Revolution	"Virginia Bluebell"	Miranda Lambert; Jennifer Kennard
2009	Carrie Underwood	Play On	"Play On"	Carrie Underwood; Luke Laird
2010	Amy Grant	Somewhere Down the Road	"Overnight"	Amy Grant; Luke Laird; Audrey Spillman
2011	Miranda Lambert	Four the Record	"Fine Tune"	Luke Laird
2011	Miranda Lambert	Four the Record	"Baggage Claim"	Miranda Lambert; Luke Laird
2011	Eli Young Band	Life at Best	"The Fight"	Tim Putnam
2011	Eli Young Band	Life at Best	"How Quickly You Forget"	Mike Eli; Daniel Tashian
2012	Kelly Clarkson	Greatest Hits – Chapter One	"Don't Rush"	Blu Sanders; Lindsay Chapman
2012	Little Big Town	Tornado	"Pontoon"	Barry Dean; Luke Laird
2012	Little Big Town	Tornado	"Tornado"	Delta Maid
2012	Little Big Town	Tornado	"Self Made"	Jedd Hughes; Karen Fairchild; Jimi Westbrook
2012	Little Big Town	Tornado	"Night Owl"	Karen Fairchild; Kimberly Schlapman; Phillip Sweet; Jimi Westbrook
2012	Nashville Cast	The Music of Nashville: Season 1 Volume 1	"Buried Under"	Chris DeStefano
2013	Sheryl Crow	Feels Like Home	"Stay at Home Mother"	Sheryl Crow
2013	Brett Eldredge	Bring You Back	"Go On Without Me"	Brett Eldredge; Ross Copperman
2013	Toby Keith	Drinks After Work	"Drinks After Work"	Luke Laird; Barry Dean
2013	Lady Antebellum	Golden	"Downtown"	Shane McAnally; Luke Laird
2013	Keith Urban	Fuse	"Good Thing"	Keith Urban; Mike Elizondo
2014	Miranda Lambert	Platinum	"Automatic"	Miranda Lambert; Nicolle Galyon
2014	Miranda Lambert	Platinum	"Platinum"	Miranda Lambert; Nicolle Galyon
2014	Miranda Lambert	Platinum	"Girls"	Nicolle Galyon; Jimmy Robbins
2014	Miranda Lambert	Platinum	"Priscilla"	Nicolle Galyon; Jimmy Robbins
2014	Miranda Lambert	Platinum	"Babies Makin' Babies"	Nicolle Galyon; Jimmy Robbins
2014	Miranda Lambert	Platinum	"Smokin' & Drinkin'" feat. Little Big Town	Luke Laird; Shane McAnally
2014	Miranda Lambert	Platinum	"Hard Staying Sober"	Miranda Lambert; Luke Laird
2014	Sunny Sweeney	Provoked	"Second Guessing"	Sunny Sweeney
2014	Sunny Sweeney	Provoked	"Uninvited"	Sunny Sweeney
2014	Sunny Sweeney	Provoked	"Used Cars"	Sunny Sweeney
2014	Sunny Sweeney	Provoked	"Backhanded Compliment"	Sunny Sweeney
2014	Blake Shelton	Bringing Back the Sunshine	"Anyone Else"	Luke Laird; Barry Dean
2014	Little Big Town	Pain Killer	"Quit Breaking Up With Me"	Shane McAnally; Busbee
2014	Little Big Town	Pain Killer	"Good People"	Jay Joyce; Jeremy Spillman
2014	Little Big Town	Pain Killer	"Things You Don't Think About"	Ross Copperman; Shane McAnally
2014	Little Big Town	Pain Killer	"Turn The Lights On"	Jay Joyce; Jeremy Spillman; Jimi Westbrook; Karen Fairchild; Kimberly Schlapman; Phillip Sweet
2014	Labrinth	Non-album Single	"Jealous"	Timothy McKenzie; Josh Kear
2015	Halestorm	Into the Wild Life	"What Sober Couldn't Say"	Lzzy Hale; Scott Stevens; Joe Hottinger
2015	Kelly Clarkson	Piece by Piece	"Good Goes the Bye"	Shane McAnally; Jimmy Robbins
2015	Jana Kramer	Thirty One	"Said No One Ever"	Nicolle Galyon
2015	Miranda Lambert	"Hot Pursuit" Soundtrack	"Two Of A Crime"	Miranda Lambert; Nicolle Galyon
2015	Kacey Musgraves	Pageant Material	"Good Ol' Boys Club"	Kacey Musgraves; Luke Laird
2016	Miranda Lambert	The Weight of These Wings		
2016	Miranda Lambert	The Weight of These Wings	"Highway Vagabond"	Luke Dick; Shane McAnally
2016	Miranda Lambert	The Weight of These Wings	"Ugly Lights"	Miranda Lambert; Liz Rose
2016	Miranda Lambert	The Weight of These Wings	"Pink Sunglasses"	Rodney Clawson; Luke Dick
2016	Miranda Lambert	The Weight of These Wings	"Getaway Driver"	Miranda Lambert; Anderson East
2016	Miranda Lambert	The Weight of These Wings	"Smoking Jacket"	Miranda Lambert; Lucie Silvas
2016	Miranda Lambert	The Weight of These Wings	"Pushin' Time"	Miranda Lambert; Foy Vance
2016	Miranda Lambert	The Weight of These Wings	"Things That Break"	Miranda Lambert; Jessi Alexander Stewart
2016	Miranda Lambert	The Weight of These Wings	"Tomboy"	Miranda Lambert; Aaron Raitiere
2016	Miranda Lambert	The Weight of These Wings	"Keeper of the Flame"	Miranda Lambert; Liz Rose
2016	Miranda Lambert	The Weight of These Wings	"Six Degrees of Separation"	Miranda Lambert; Nicolle Galyon
2017	Nelly Furtado	The Ride	"Tap Dancing"	Nelly Furtado; Liz Rose
2018	Kacey Musgraves	Golden Hour	"Butterflies"	Kacey Musgraves; Luke Laird
2018	Kacey Musgraves	Golden Hour	"Velvet Elvis"	Kacey Musgraves; Luke Dick
2018	Kacey Musgraves	Golden Hour	"Rainbow"	Kacey Musgraves; Shane McAnally
2018	Lucie Silvas	E. G. O.	"Kite"	Lucie Silvas Gabe Simon
2018	Lady Gaga	A Star Is Born (2018 soundtrack)	"Always Remember Us This Way"	Lady Gaga; Hillary Lindsey; Lori McKenna
2018	Lady Gaga	A Star Is Born (2018 soundtrack)	"I'll Never Love Again"	Lady Gaga; Hillary Lindsey; Aaron Raitiere
2019	Jon Pardi	Heartache Medication	"Heartache Medication"	Jon Pardi; Barry Dean
2020	Kelly Clarkson	—N/a	"I Dare You"	Jesse Shatkin; Jeff Gitelman; Laura Veltz; Ben West
2024	Miranda Lambert	Postcards from Texas	"Lookingback at Luckenbach"	Miranda Lambert; Shane McAnally
2024	Miranda Lambert	Postcards from Texas	"Alimony"	Miranda Lambert; Shane McAnally

== Awards and nominations ==
Year	Association	Category	Nominated work	Result
2010	Academy of Country Music	Song of the Year	"White Liar"	Nominated
2010	Country Music Association	Song of the Year	"White Liar"	Nominated
2013	Country Music Association	Song of the Year	"Pontoon"	Nominated
2014	Country Music Association	Song of the Year	"Automatic"	Nominated
2014	Nashville Songwriters Association International Awards	Song of the Year	"Automatic"	Won
2015	Academy of Country Music	Song of the Year	"Automatic"	Won
2015	Grammy Awards	Best Country Song	"Automatic"	Nominated
2019	Country Music Association	Song of the Year	"Rainbow"	Nominated
2020	Grammy Awards	Song of the Year	"Always Remember Us This Way"	Nominated
2020	Grammy Awards	Best Song Written for Visual Media	"I'll Never Love Again" (Film Version)	Won
2020	Academy of Country Music	Group of the Year	The Highwomen	Nominated
2020	CMT Awards	Group Video of the Year	"Crowded Table"	Nominated
2020	Country Music Association	Song of the Year	"Bluebird"	Nominated
2021	Grammy Awards	Best Country Song	"Bluebird"	Nominated
2021	Grammy Awards	Best Country Song	"Crowded Table"	Won
