= Pain Killer (Little Big Town album) =

Studio album by Little Big Town
- Released: October 21, 2014
- Genre: Country
- Length: 46:19
- Label: Capitol Nashville
- Producer: Jay Joyce

Little Big Town chronology
Tornado (2012)	Pain Killer (2014)	Wanderlust (2016)

Singles from Pain Killer
- 1. "Day Drinking" Released: June 9, 2014; 2. "Girl Crush" Released: December 15, 2014; 3. "Pain Killer" Released: August 24, 2015

Pain Killer is the sixth studio album by American country music group Little Big Town. It was released on October 21, 2014, through Capitol Nashville. Little Big Town co-wrote eight of the album's thirteen tracks. Pain Killer was produced by Jay Joyce.

== Critical reception ==
Professional ratings
Aggregate scores
Source	Rating
Metacritic	83/100
Review scores
Source	Rating
AllMusic	4.5/5 stars
Billboard	4/5 stars
Country Weekly	B+
Los Angeles Times	3/4 stars

Pain Killer received widespread critical acclaim. In giving the album a rating of "B+", Bob Paxman of Country Weekly praised the group's vocal harmonies and the songwriting, particularly the songs written by Lori McKenna, but criticized the "overly cluttered" production on some tracks. Stephen Thomas Erlewine of AllMusic called the album as "the rarest thing in contemporary country, a record with an expansive world-view delivered with a kinetic kick and infallible melodies, a record that gives no indication of where it's going upon first listen but remains compelling upon further spins". The album has a score of 83 on Metacritic indicating “universal acclaim.”

=== Accolades ===
Year	Association	Category	Result
2015	Academy of Country Music	Album of the Year	Nominated
2015	Country Music Association	Album of the Year	Nominated
2016	Grammy Awards	Best Country Album	Nominated

== Commercial performance ==
The album debuted at number seven on Billboard 200 and number three on Top Country Albums chart, selling 42,000 copies in its first week. As of January 2017, the album has sold 511,300 copies in the United States. The album was certified platinum by the Recording Industry Association of America (RIAA) for combined sales and album-equivalent units of over a million units.

== Track listing ==
The album's track listing was announced on July 14.

No.	Title	Writer(s)	Lead vocals	Length
1.	"Quit Breaking Up with Me"	busbee; Natalie Hemby; Shane McAnally	Fairchild; Schlapman	3:24
2.	"Day Drinking"	Karen Fairchild; Jimi Westbrook; Phillip Sweet; Troy Verges; Barry Dean	Fairchild	2:58
3.	"Tumble and Fall"	Fairchild; Kimberly Schlapman; Lori McKenna; Liz Rose; Hillary Lindsey	Westbrook	4:41
4.	"Pain Killer"	Fairchild; Westbrook; Blair Daly; Lindsey	Fairchild	3:11
5.	"Girl Crush"	McKenna; Rose; Lindsey	Fairchild	3:13
6.	"Faster Gun"	Jeremy Spillman; Ryan Tyndell; Westbrook; Sweet	Sweet; Westbrook	4:10
7.	"Good People"	Jay Joyce; Hemby; Spillman	Schlapman	3:41
8.	"Stay All Night"	Westbrook; Sweet; Brent Cobb; Jason Saenz	Sweet; Westbrook	2:45
9.	"Save Your Sin"	McKenna; Rose; Lindsey	Schlapman	2:46
10.	"Live Forever"	Fairchild; Westbrook; Sweet; Schlapman; Spillman; Tyndell	Sweet	4:14
11.	"Things You Don't Think About"	Hemby; McAnally; Ross Copperman	Fairchild	3:36
12.	"Turn the Lights On"	Fairchild; Westbrook; Sweet; Schlapman; Hemby; Joyce; Spillman	Fairchild	4:08
13.	"Silver and Gold"	Jedd Hughes; Joyce; Schlapman; Fairchild	Westbrook	3:33
Total length:				46:19

== Personnel ==
Adapted from Allmusic and Pain Killer liner notes.

Little Big Town

- Karen Fairchild — vocals
- Kimberly Schlapman — vocals
- Philip Sweet — vocals, drums, acoustic guitar
- Jimi Westbrook — vocals, acoustic guitar

Musicians

- Johnny Duke — acoustic guitar, electric guitar, pedal steel guitar
- Jedd Hughes — acoustic guitar, electric guitar, ganjo, tiple
- Jay Joyce — electric guitar, acoustic guitar, keyboards, ganjo, mandolin, synthesizer, bass guitar, bells, pump organ
- Seth Rausch — drums
- Giles Reaves — keyboards, percussion, vocoder, synthesizer horns, vibraphone, vocal pads
- John Thomasson — bass guitar
- Ryan Tyndell — acoustic guitar, 12-string guitar

Production

- Richard Dodd — mastering
- Jason Hall — engineering, mixing
- Jedd Hughes — engineering
- Scott Johnson — production assistant
- Jay Joyce — engineering, mixing, production
- Reid Scelza — assistant
- Matthew Wheeler — assistant

Visual and imagery

- Karen Fairchild — art direction
- Kelly Jerrell — art direction
- Meritocracy — art direction
- Matthew Welch — photography

== Charts ==
=== Chart positions ===
Chart (2014–16)	Peak position
Canadian Albums (Billboard)	49
UK Albums (OCC)	143
UK Country Albums (Official Charts)	2
US Billboard 200	7
US Top Country Albums (Billboard)	3

=== Year-end charts ===
Chart (2014)	Position
US Top Country Albums (Billboard)	54
Chart (2015)	Position
US Billboard 200	38
US Top Country Albums (Billboard)	10
Chart (2016)	Position
US Top Country Albums (Billboard)	30

== Certifications ==
Region	Certification	Certified units/sales
United States (RIAA)	Platinum	1,000,000^{‡}
^{‡} Sales+streaming figures based on certification alone.
