= Get Me Some of That =

Single by Thomas Rhett

from the album It Goes Like This
- Released: November 18, 2013
- Recorded: 2013
- Genre: Country
- Length: 3:09
- Label: Valory
- Songwriters: Rhett Akins; Michael Carter; Cole Swindell
- Producer: Luke Laird

Thomas Rhett singles chronology
"It Goes Like This" (2013)	"Get Me Some of That" (2013)	"Small Town Throwdown" (2014)

"Get Me Some of That" is a song recorded by American country music singer Thomas Rhett. It was released in November 2013 as the fourth single from his debut album, It Goes Like This. The song was written by Rhett's father Rhett Akins, along with Michael Carter and Cole Swindell.

== Critical reception ==
The song received a favorable review from Taste of Country, which called it "a clever turn of a popular expression." The review stated that "Rhett makes the sentiment sound sweeter than Georgia tea in this song." Bobby Peacock of Roughstock gave the song three and a half stars out of five, writing that "amid the lines that seem clichéd on the surface are plenty of enjoyable lines […] that lend a playfulness and wit beyond other songs of this sort." Peacock also praised the song's "laid-back" production and Rhett's "laid-back and smooth" delivery. Kevin John Coyne of Country Universe gave a mixed review of the song, rating the song a B− and stating, "The mind-numbingly dull lyric has nothing new to offer, with details that sound more like a pitch for an Axe commercial than an actual documentation of a realistic human experience" and "But Rhett sells it anyway. It’s nice to hear a guy who can actually sing being allowed to do so, without any production tricks or clumsy attempts at spoken word." The song was criticized in Maddie and Tae's "Girl in a Country Song".

== Music video ==
The music video was directed by TK McKamy and premiered in December 2013.

== Commercial performance ==
"Get Me Some of That" debuted at number 55 on the U.S. Billboard Country Airplay chart for the week of November 30, 2013. It also debuted at number 30 on the U.S. Billboard Hot Country Songs chart for the week of November 16, 2013. It reached number 94 on the U.S. Billboard Hot 100 chart for the week of January 25, 2014. The song was certified four-times Platinum by the RIAA on July 21, 2025. As of June 2014, the song has sold 747,000 copies in the U.S.

The song also debuted at number 72 on the Canadian Hot 100 chart for the week of November 16, 2013.

== Charts ==
=== Weekly charts ===
Chart (2013–2014)	Peak position
Canada (Canadian Hot 100)	49
Canada Country (Billboard)	6
US Billboard Hot 100	41
US Country Airplay (Billboard)	1
US Hot Country Songs (Billboard)	4

=== Year-end charts ===
Chart (2014)	Position
US Country Airplay (Billboard)	20
US Hot Country Songs (Billboard)	16

== Certifications ==
Region	Certification	Certified units/sales
Australia (ARIA)	Gold	35,000^{‡}
United States (RIAA)	4× Platinum	4,000,000^{‡}
^{‡} Sales+streaming figures based on certification alone.
