= Tornado (Little Big Town album) =

Studio album by Little Big Town
- Released: September 11, 2012
- Genre: Country
- Length: 38:09
- Label: Capitol Nashville
- Producer: Jay Joyce

Little Big Town chronology
The Reason Why (2010)	Tornado (2012)	Pain Killer (2014)

Singles from Tornado
- 1. "Pontoon" Released: April 30, 2012; 2. "Tornado" Released: October 1, 2012; 3. "Your Side of the Bed" Released: April 8, 2013; 4. "Sober" Released: September 30, 2013

Professional ratings
Aggregate scores
Source	Rating
Metacritic	75/100
Review scores
Source	Rating
Allmusic	4/5 stars
Slant Magazine	4/5 stars

Tornado is the fifth studio album by American country music group Little Big Town. It was released on September 11, 2012, via Capitol Nashville. "Pontoon," which was released in April 2012 as the album's lead-off single, has since become their first number one song on the US Billboard Hot Country Songs chart and Little Big Town's fastest-rising single to date. The album's second single, "Tornado," was released on October 1, 2012. It became their first album since 2005's The Road to Here to produce two top 10 singles and to be certified platinum by the Recording Industry Association of America (RIAA).

== Commercial performance ==
"Tornado" debuted at number two on the US Billboard 200, selling 113,000 copies in its first week. The album stayed atop the Billboard Country Albums charts for its first 5 weeks, making it their longest running number one album. As of December 2013, the album has sold 1,025,000 copies in the United States. It is the band's first album since The Road to Here to receive a certification from the RIAA. It is also their first album of their career to have two certified singles from the RIAA.

== Track listing ==
No.	Title	Writer(s)	Lead vocals	Length
1.	"Pavement Ends"	Jason Saenz, Brent Cobb	Westbrook	2:31
2.	"Pontoon"	Barry Dean, Natalie Hemby, Luke Laird	Fairchild	3:35
3.	"Sober"	Liz Rose, Hillary Lindsey, Lori McKenna	Schlapman	3:15
4.	"Front Porch Thing"	Chris Stapleton, Adam Hood	Sweet	3:26
5.	"Your Side of the Bed"	McKenna, Karen Fairchild, Jimi Westbrook, Kimberly Schlapman, Phillip Sweet	Fairchild, Westbrook	3:41
6.	"Leavin' in Your Eyes"	Brett Warren, Brad Warren, Jay Joyce, Westbrook, Fairchild, Schlapman	Westbrook	3:13
7.	"Tornado"	Hemby, Delta Maid	Fairchild	3:43
8.	"On Fire Tonight"	Laird, Sweet, Westbrook, Fairchild, Schlapman	Westbrook	3:12
9.	"Can't Go Back"	Hemby, Kate York, Rosi Golan	Schlapman	3:43
10.	"Self Made"	Hemby, Jedd Hughes, Westbrook, Fairchild	Fairchild, Westbrook	4:08
11.	"Night Owl"	Hemby, Westbrook, Fairchild, Schlapman, Sweet	Fairchild, Schlapman, Sweet, Westbrook	3:45
Total length:				38:09

== Personnel ==
=== Little Big Town ===
- Karen Fairchild – vocals
- Kimberly Schlapman – vocals
- Phillip Sweet – vocals, acoustic guitar
- Jimi Westbrook – vocals

=== Musicians ===
- Johnny Duke – electric guitar, acoustic guitar, banjo, mandolin, Dobro, lap steel guitar
- Jedd Hughes – electric guitar, acoustic guitar, 12-string guitar, mandolin
- Jay Joyce – electric guitar, acoustic guitar, Hammond B-3 organ, programming, synthesizer
- Luke Laird – electric guitar
- Seth Rausch – drums
- Giles Reaves – synthesizer, keyboards, percussion, Wurlitzer electric piano, Hammond B-3 organ
- John Thomasson – bass guitar, Moog Taurus bass pedals

== Charts ==
=== Weekly charts ===
Chart (2012)	Peak position
Canadian Albums Chart	16
US Billboard 200	2
US Billboard Top Country Albums	1

=== Year-end charts ===
Chart (2012)	Position
US Billboard 200	78
US Top Country Albums (Billboard)	19

Chart (2013)	Position
US Billboard 200	29
US Top Country Albums (Billboard)	7

Chart (2014)	Position
US Top Country Albums (Billboard)	55

=== Decade-end charts ===
Chart (2010–2019)	Position
US Billboard 200	128

== Certifications ==
Region	Certification	Certified units/sales
Canada (Music Canada)	Gold	40,000^{^}
United States (RIAA)	2× Platinum	1,025,000
^{^} Shipments figures based on certification alone.
