= Puxico (album) =

Studio album by Natalie Hemby
- Released: January 13, 2017
- Recorded: 2010–16
- Genres: Country; Americana; folk
- Length: 33:10
- Label: GetWrucke
- Producers: Natalie Hemby (exec.); Mike Wrucke

Natalie Hemby chronology
Puxico (2017)	Pins and Needles (2021)

Singles from Puxico
- 1. "Return" Released: October 21, 2016

Puxico is the debut studio album by American singer and songwriter Natalie Hemby, released on January 13, 2017, through her own label, GetWrucke Productions. Hemby started recording the album around the same time she created a documentary about her hometown Puxico in 2010.

== Singles ==
Return was released as the lead single from Puxico on October 21, 2016.

== Critical reception ==
Professional ratings
Review scores
Source	Rating
Rolling Stone	3.5/5 stars
The New York Times	(favorable)
PopMatters	7/10 stars

Will Hermes from Rolling Stone stated about the album "It's a nostalgic LP, musically and thematically, about the value of roots – surprising, maybe, from a woman behind songs like Lambert's 'Pink Sunglasses' and 'Getaway Driver', which broaden country's palette. But Hemby's a master craftswoman, and in an era of rule-by-Twitter, songs like 'Grand Restoration' and 'Time Honored Tradition' make a case for traditionalism being its own kind of progressivism."

=== Accolades ===
Publication	Rank	List
PopMatters	6	15 Best Americana Albums of 2017
Rolling Stone	12	40 Best Country and Americana Albums of 2017

== Track listing ==
Puxico track listing
No.	Title	Writer(s)	Length
1.	"Time Honoured Tradition"	Natalie Hemby; Trent Dabbs	3:16
2.	"Lovers on Display"	Hemby; Dabbs	3:35
3.	"Grand Restoration"	Hemby; Dabbs	2:58
4.	"Cairo, IL"	Hemby; Jonathan Lawson; Cassandra Lawson	2:59
5.	"Ferris Wheel"	Hemby; Lindsay Chapman	3:49
6.	"Worn"	Hemby; Chapman	3:36
7.	"This Town Still Talks About You"	Hemby; Kelly Archer; Jenn Schott	4:28
8.	"I'll Remember How You Loved Me"	Hemby; Jon Randall	4:30
9.	"Return"	Hemby; Dabbs	3:59

== Personnel ==
- Natalie Hemby – vocals
- Mike Wrucke – production
- Greg Leisz – pedal steel guitar
- Andy Sundin Creative – art, layout

== Charts ==
Chart (2017)	Peak position
US Heatseekers Albums (Billboard)	8
US Top Country Albums (Billboard)	31
US Independent Albums (Billboard)	32
