= The House That Built Me =

Single by Miranda Lambert

from the album Revolution
- Released: March 8, 2010
- Recorded: 2009
- Genre: Country
- Length: 3:56
- Label: Columbia Nashville
- Songwriters: Tom Douglas; Allen Shamblin
- Producers: Frank Liddell; Mike Wrucke

Miranda Lambert singles chronology
"White Liar" (2009)	"The House That Built Me" (2010)	"Only Prettier" (2010)

Music video
- "The House That Built Me" on YouTube

"The House That Built Me" is a song written by Tom Douglas and Allen Shamblin, and recorded by American country music artist Miranda Lambert. Blake Shelton was originally set to record the song, but when Lambert heard it, she emotionally reacted to the lyrics, and immediately wanted to record it for herself. It was released in March 2010 as the third single from her third studio album, Revolution. It is the fastest-rising single of her career, reaching the Top 20 in its eighth week. For the chart week of June 12, 2010, the song became Lambert's first number one hit on the U.S. Billboard Hot Country Songs chart, and held its place at the top for four consecutive weeks. It is also Lambert's first single of her career that she did not have a hand in writing. Additionally, it was her second single to receive a platinum certification from the RIAA on January 31, 2011.

Lambert performed the song during the 2010 Academy of Country Music Awards on April 18, 2010, and received a standing ovation. At the 53rd Annual Grammy Awards on February 13, 2011, she won the Grammy for Best Female Country Vocal Performance.

== Content ==
"The House That Built Me" is a country ballad in the key of F major driven primarily by acoustic guitar with steel guitar fills. The song's female narrator describes returning, as an adult, to the house that she grew up in, and asking the person who now lives in the house if she could step inside and take a look around. She refers to it as "the house that built [her]," because of all the memories that she had of growing up within its walls.

Allen Shamblin based the song on his experiences going back to the house in Huffman, Texas that he grew up in at least once a year.

== Critical reception ==
The song received critical acclaim. Matt Bjorke described the song favorably in his review of Revolution, referring it as "one of the absolute best songs on the record." He notes that while it could've been "a bombastic, overdone song," Lambert and her producers kept it "earthy and just downright beautiful." Bjorke later reviewed the single itself, describing it as a "song that plays on the country cliché of nostalgia without ever feeling cliché" and concluded that it stands a good chance of nomination in the 2010 CMA Awards. Blake Boldt of Engine 145 gave the song a thumbs up, favoring Lambert's preference in "organic storytelling instead of contrived commercial jingles." He described the song itself as "a gorgeous piece of melancholy country without getting squishy or sentimental" and called it an "early favorite for single of the year." Dan Milliken of Country Universe gave the song an A rating, describing it favorably as "the best on the album" and a standout for radio, because of "its grace and intelligence, not because it happens to be more disposably catchy than the others surrounding it."

"The House That Built Me" was ranked No. 1 on Engine 145's Best Country Songs of 2009. The song received nominations in three categories (Single of the Year, Song of the Year, and Music Video of the Year) at the 2010 CMA Awards. Billboard and Paste both ranked it number one on their lists of the 10 greatest Miranda Lambert songs. Rolling Stone ranked it #441 on its "Top 500 Best Songs of All Time" list, and at #77 on its "200 Greatest Country Songs of All Time" list.

== Commercial performance ==
"The House That Built Me" debuted at number 51 on the U.S. Billboard Hot Country Songs chart for the week of March 6, 2010. It also debuted at number 98 on the U.S. Billboard Hot 100 chart for the week of April 10, 2010, and at number 91 on the Canadian Hot 100 chart for the week of May 1, 2010; overall, it has become her most successful single on both of these charts. It is Lambert's fastest-rising single to date, and for the chart week of June 12, 2010, the song became her first number-one hit on the U.S. Billboard Hot Country Songs chart. It reached its 2 million sales mark in the US by April 2014. As of May 2016, the song has sold 2.267 million copies in the US.

== Music video ==
The music video, which was directed by Trey Fanjoy, premiered on CMT on April 8, 2010. In the video, Lambert's tour bus pulls up to her childhood home, and she walks up to the front door to ask if she could come in. Inside the house, she wanders through the various rooms, while documentary flashbacks of her family and herself as a child in a house that looks nearly identical to the one in the video, are mixed in. Throughout the video, Lambert is shown performing with her acoustic guitar, seated on the floor in one of the bedrooms. Some of the footage used for the flashbacks consists of Lambert's own home videos. The video was filmed at a house just outside Nashville.

Lambert told The Boot that the concept of the video was clear: "This was one of those videos that needed to be really obvious ... [The director] found a house that looked a lot like the house I grew up in. There's no drama in the video. It just is what it is. It represents the song in such a great way."

== In popular culture ==
=== Parodies ===
- American parody artist Cledus T. Judd released a parody of the song under the title "The House That Broke Me" on his 2012 album, Parodyziac!!

=== Covers ===
- American YouTuber Chester See released a cover of "The House That Built Me" on his YouTube channel in 2015.
- American country artist Tanya Tucker recorded a cover of "The House That Built Me" for her album, While I'm Livin', which was released on August 23, 2019. While Lambert's version is from the perspective of a child who grew up in the titular house, Tucker's version is sung from the perspective of a mother who watched her children grow up in the house.
- Hudson Westbrook released a cover of "The House That Built Me" in 2025

== Charts ==
=== Weekly charts ===
Chart (2010)	Peak position
Canada Hot 100 (Billboard)	52
Canada Country (Billboard)	2
US Billboard Hot 100	28
US Hot Country Songs (Billboard)	1

=== Year-end charts ===
Chart (2010)	Position
US Billboard Hot 100	91
US Hot Country Songs (Billboard)	11

=== Decade-end charts ===
Chart (2010–2019)	Position
US Hot Country Songs (Billboard)	38

== Certifications ==
Region	Certification	Certified units/sales
United States (RIAA)	4× Platinum	2,267,000

== Awards and nominations ==
"The House That Built Me" received three nominations at the 53rd Grammy Awards. It won the Grammy Award for Best Female Country Vocal Performance, giving Lambert her first Grammy win.

Award	Category	Result
44th CMA Awards	Song of the Year	Won
44th CMA Awards	Single of the Year	Nominated
44th CMA Awards	Music Video of the Year	Won
53rd Grammy Awards	Song of the Year	Nominated
53rd Grammy Awards	Best Country Song	Nominated
53rd Grammy Awards	Best Female Country Vocal Performance	Won
46th ACM Awards	Song of the Year	Won
46th ACM Awards	Single Record of the Year	Won
46th ACM Awards	Video of the Year	Won
