= It Goes Like This =

Studio album by Thomas Rhett
- Released: October 29, 2013
- Recorded: 2012–13
- Genres: Country; country rock
- Length: 41:23
- Label: Valory
- Producers: Jay Joyce; Michael Knox; Luke Laird

Thomas Rhett chronology
Thomas Rhett (2012)	It Goes Like This (2013)	Tangled Up (2015)

Singles from It Goes Like This
- 1. "Something to Do with My Hands" Released: February 21, 2012; 2. "Beer with Jesus" Released: September 4, 2012; 3. "It Goes Like This" Released: May 6, 2013; 4. "Get Me Some of That" Released: November 18, 2013; 5. "Make Me Wanna" Released: August 4, 2014

It Goes Like This is the debut studio album by American country music singer Thomas Rhett. It was released on October 29, 2013, via Valory Music Group. The album's release was announced on August 22.

== Content ==
It includes the singles "It Goes Like This", "Get Me Some of That", and "Make Me Wanna". It also includes the previously released singles "Something to Do with My Hands" and "Beer with Jesus" from Rhett's prior self-titled EP release.

Jay Joyce produced six of the album's tracks, of which five previously appeared on Rhett's self-titled extended play. Michael Knox and Luke Laird produce three tracks each.

== Critical reception ==
Professional ratings
Review scores
Source	Rating
AllMusic	3.5/5 stars
Roughstock	4/5 stars

The album received positive reviews from critics. Steve Leggett of Allmusic rated the album 3.5 stars out of 5, saying that "It's a solidly professional outing, featuring all three of his singles and other tracks of similar construction, and it's full of energy, good humor, and the kind of backroad good-old-boy wisdom that everybody seems to love these days, even if it feeds more off nostalgia than reality." Giving it 4 out of 5 stars, Matt Bjorke of Roughstock called it "a very good, musically diverse debut album, an album which should find some sort of an audience."

== Track listing ==
No.	Title	Writer(s)	Producer	Length
1.	"Whatcha Got in That Cup"	Thomas Rhett; Rhett Akins; Craig Wiseman	Jay Joyce	2:59
2.	"Something to Do with My Hands"	Rhett; Lee Thomas Miller; Chris Stapleton	Joyce	3:20
3.	"Get Me Some of That"	Michael Carter; Akins; Cole Swindell	Luke Laird	3:09
4.	"Call Me Up"	Luke Laird; Akins; Shane McAnally	Laird	3:15
5.	"It Goes Like This"	Akins; Ben Hayslip; Jimmy Robbins	Michael Knox	3:06
6.	"Make Me Wanna"	Rhett; Bart Butler; Larry McCoy	Joyce	3:46
7.	"Front Porch Junkies" (remix)	Rhett; Brad Warren; Brett Warren; Mark Irwin; Josh Kear	Joyce	3:44
8.	"In a Minute"	Rhett; Akins; Ashley Gorley	Knox	3:41
9.	"Take You Home"	Gorley; Chris Tompkins; Rodney Clawson	Knox	3:39
10.	"Sorry for Partyin'"	Rhett; Barry Dean; Robbins	Laird	3:29
11.	"All-American Middle Class White Boy"	Rhett; Jay Joyce; Brad Warren; Brett Warren	Joyce	2:59
12.	"Beer with Jesus"	Rhett; Rick Huckaby; Lance Miller	Joyce	4:15
Total length:				41:23

== Personnel ==
- Thomas Rhett – lead vocals, acoustic guitar, mandolin, drums
- Tony Harrell – acoustic piano, Hammond B3 organ
- Matt Stanfield – keyboards
- Jody Stevens – programming
- Jay Joyce – Fender Rhodes, Hammond B3 organ, synth strings, programming, baritone guitar, electric guitar, mandolin, bass guitar, backing vocals
- Pat Buchanan – electric guitar
- J. T. Corenflos – electric guitar
- Jedd Hughes – electric guitar
- Rob McNelley – electric guitar, dobro
- Adam Shoenfeld – electric guitar
- Joel Key – acoustic guitar, banjo
- Luke Laird – acoustic guitar
- John Osborne – acoustic guitar, banjo
- Danny Rader – acoustic guitar
- Ilya Toshinsky – acoustic guitar
- Ed Williams – acoustic guitar, mandolin, backing vocals
- Steve Fishell – pedal steel guitar
- Mike Johnson – steel guitar
- Russ Pahl – pedal steel guitar
- Kevin "Swine" Grantt – bass guitar, Jew's harp
- Lee Hendricks – bass guitar
- Jimmie Lee Sloas – bass guitar
- Matt Chamberlain – drums, percussion
- Fred Eltringham – drums, percussion
- Greg Morrow – drums, drum programming
- Craig Wright – drums, percussion
- Rich Redmond – percussion
- Brett Warren – harmonica, backing vocals
- Rhett Akins – backing vocals
- Danielle Bradbery – backing vocals
- Whitney Cheshier – backing vocals
- Mickey Jack Cones – backing vocals
- Virginia Davis – backing vocals
- Drew Gaw – backing vocals
- Kelsea Granda – backing vocals
- Jace Hall – backing vocals
- Tom Luteran – backing vocals
- Gloria Martinez – backing vocals
- Mark Martinez – backing vocals
- Alex Quattlebaum – backing vocals
- Nichole Rodriguez – backing vocals
- Jess Rosen – backing vocals
- Julie Stuckey – backing vocals
- Russell Terrell – backing vocals
- Samantha Thornton – backing vocals
- Kelly Tillotson – backing vocals
- Brad Warren – backing vocals

== Chart performance ==
The album debuted at No. 6 on the Billboard 200 and No. 2 on the Top Current Albums chart with 36,000 copies sold in the U.S. on its first week of release. The album has sold 271,000 copies in the US as of September 2015.

=== Weekly charts ===
Chart (2013–15)	Peak position
Canadian Albums (Billboard)	23
US Billboard 200	6
US Top Country Albums (Billboard)	2

=== Year-end charts ===
Chart (2013)	Position
US Top Country Albums (Billboard)	67
Chart (2014)	Position
US Billboard 200	160
US Top Country Albums (Billboard)	30
Chart (2015)	Position
US Top Country Albums (Billboard)	61

== Certifications ==
Certifications for It Goes Like This
Region	Certification	Certified units/sales
Canada (Music Canada)	Gold	40,000^{‡}
United States (RIAA)	Platinum	1,000,000^{‡}
^{‡} Sales+streaming figures based on certification alone.
