= It Goes Like This (song) =

Single by Thomas Rhett

from the album It Goes Like This
- Released: May 6, 2013
- Recorded: 2013
- Genre: Country
- Length: 3:06
- Label: Valory
- Songwriter(s): Rhett Akins; Ben Hayslip; Jimmy Robbins
- Producer(s): Michael Knox

Thomas Rhett singles chronology
"Beer with Jesus" (2012)	"It Goes Like This" (2013)	"Get Me Some of That" (2013)

"It Goes Like This" is a song recorded by American country music singer Thomas Rhett. It was released in May 2013 as the third single from his debut album, It Goes Like This. The song was written by Rhett Akins (Thomas' father), Ben Hayslip, and Jimmy Robbins.

== Critical reception ==
Billy Dukes of Taste of Country gave the song three and a half stars out of five, writing that "the charismatic songwriter is a natural storyteller, and his lyrics bounce to life with each verse and chorus." Giving it 4 out of 5 stars, Bobby Peacock of Roughstock described the song's premise as "interesting" and said that "Rhett's lightly grained, casual, friendly delivery brings to mind the rough-edged charm of Kip Moore."

== Music video ==
The music video was directed by TK McKamy and premiered in June 2013.

== Chart and sales performance ==
"It Goes Like This" debuted at number 43 on the U.S. Billboard Country Airplay chart for the week of May 11, 2013. It also debuted at number 28 on the U.S. Billboard Hot Country Songs chart for the week of June 1, 2013. It also debuted at number 96 on the U.S. Billboard Hot 100 chart for the week of June 29, 2013. It also debuted at number 92 on the Canadian Hot 100 chart for the week of July 27, 2013. The song has sold 1,287,000 copies in the United States as of April 2014.

== Charts and certifications ==
=== Weekly charts ===
Chart (2013)	Peak position
Canada (Canadian Hot 100)	33
Canada Country (Billboard)	4
US Billboard Hot 100	25
US Country Airplay (Billboard)	1
US Hot Country Songs (Billboard)	2

=== Year-end charts ===
Chart (2013)	Position
US Billboard Hot 100	90
US Country Airplay (Billboard)	2
US Hot Country Songs (Billboard)	13

=== Certifications ===
Region	Certification	Certified units/sales
Australia (ARIA)	Gold	35,000^{‡}
United States (RIAA)	4× Platinum	4,000,000^{‡}
^{‡} Sales+streaming figures based on certification alone.
