= Beer with Jesus =

Single by Thomas Rhett

from the album It Goes Like This
- Released: September 4, 2012
- Recorded: 2012
- Genre: Country
- Length: 4:13
- Label: Valory
- Songwriters: Thomas Rhett; Rick Huckaby; Lance Miller
- Producer: Jay Joyce

Thomas Rhett singles chronology
"Something to Do with My Hands" (2012)	"Beer with Jesus" (2012)	"It Goes Like This" (2013)

"Beer with Jesus" is a song recorded by American country music singer Thomas Rhett. It was released in September 2012 as the second single from his debut album, It Goes Like This. Rhett wrote the song with Rick Huckaby and Lance Miller.

== Critical reception ==
Billy Dukes of Taste of Country gave the song three and a half stars out of five, writing that "the song benefits from an inherited familiarity […], allowing one to enjoy it more easily after just one listen." Matt Bjorke of Roughstock gave the song a favorable review, saying that it "absolutely redeems him from the clumsy ditty that was 'Something to Do with My Hands'" but "it could be a tough road ahead for Thomas Rhett if this interesting albeit done before lyric doesn't help break him out with radio." Kevin John Coyne of Country Universe gave the song a B+ grade, writing that "Rhett’s slightly ragged vocal is charmingly innocent and sincere" and "the production does such a great job of not getting in the way of the song."

== Music video ==
The music video was directed by Peter Zavadil and premiered in November 2012.

== Chart performance ==
"Beer with Jesus" debuted at number 49 on the U.S. Billboard Hot Country Songs chart for the week of September 8, 2012.

Chart (2012–2013)	Peak position
US Bubbling Under Hot 100 Singles (Billboard)	1
US Country Airplay (Billboard)	19
US Hot Country Songs (Billboard)	26

=== Year-end charts ===
Chart (2013)	Position
US Country Airplay (Billboard)	92
US Hot Country Songs (Billboard)	98

== Certifications ==
Region	Certification	Certified units/sales
United States (RIAA)	Gold	500,000^{‡}
^{‡} Sales+streaming figures based on certification alone.
