= Make Me Wanna =

Single by Thomas Rhett

from the album It Goes Like This
- Released: August 4, 2014
- Recorded: 2012–13
- Genre: Country pop
- Length: 3:46
- Label: Valory
- Songwriters: Thomas Rhett; Bart Butler; Larry McCoy
- Producer: Jay Joyce

Thomas Rhett singles chronology
"Small Town Throwdown" (2014)	"Make Me Wanna" (2014)	"Crash and Burn" (2015)

"Make Me Wanna" is a song co-written and recorded by the American country music singer Thomas Rhett. It was released in August 2014 as the fifth single from his first album, It Goes Like This. The song was written by Rhett, Bart Butler and Larry McCoy.

== Content ==
The song is mid-tempo with "high-toned guitars and a slowly building chorus" and a "sensitive and sexy delivery" about a man expressing his feelings to his lover. Rhett describes the song as having a Bee Gees sound.

== Critical reception ==
The song has mostly been met with a positive reception, mainly for its disco influences. Bob Paxman of Country Weekly rated the single "B+", comparing its sound to "the candy coated days of Air Supply and Andy Gibb". He thought that it was "sure to nestle easily with the female audience" and was "pleasant, if not exactly outstanding", and criticized the "references to tailgating and trucks". Writing for Taste of Country, Carrie Horton wrote, "But while the lyrics may sound a bit too much like what’s already out there, the melody makes up for it ten times over. The Bee Gees-inspired tune features staccato drum and piano undertones that echo famous disco hits like ‘Stayin' Alive,’ but with a perfect blend of twangy guitars to keep the song’s sound just true enough for any pure country fan." Liv Carter of Little Rebellion gave the song two thumbs down, criticizing the production and unoriginality of the lyric. She summarized her review by writing, "This is an uncreative lyric inexplicably paired with 1970s pop. Which means it will probably be a big hit."

== Commercial performance ==
The song entered the Country Airplay chart at No. 51 for the chart dated August 16, 2014, and the Hot Country Songs at No. 48 on September 13, 2014. It entered the Hot 100 chart at No. 99 for the chart dated November 29, 2014. It reached No. 1 on the Country Airplay chart on March 7, 2015, his third No. 1 from his debut album. It is also Thomas' first #1 hit that he co-wrote. It peaked at No. 2 on the Hot Country Songs and No. 43 on the Billboard Hot 100 for the charts dated February 28, 2015.

The song was certified three-times Platinum by the RIAA on July 21, 2025. It has sold 596,000 copies in the US as of April 2015.

== Music video ==
The music video was directed by TK McKamy and premiered in October 2014. The video uses the single version which has re-recorded vocals than the album version. However, on the second verse, it switches to a hip-hop style beat.

== Charts and certifications ==
=== Weekly charts ===
Chart (2014–2015)	Peak position
Canada Hot 100 (Billboard)	74
Canada Country (Billboard)	11
US Billboard Hot 100	43
US Country Airplay (Billboard)	1
US Hot Country Songs (Billboard)	2

=== Year-end charts ===
Chart (2014)	Position
US Country Airplay (Billboard)	95
US Hot Country Songs (Billboard)	100

Chart (2015)	Position
US Country Airplay (Billboard)	33
US Hot Country Songs (Billboard)	52

=== Certifications ===
Region	Certification	Certified units/sales
United States (RIAA)	3× Platinum	3,000,000^{‡}
^{‡} Sales+streaming figures based on certification alone.
