= Pontoon (song) =

Single by Little Big Town

from the album Tornado
- Released: April 30, 2012
- Genre: Country
- Length: 3:35
- Label: Capitol Nashville
- Songwriters: Natalie Hemby; Luke Laird; Barry Dean
- Producer: Jay Joyce

Little Big Town singles chronology
"The Reason Why" (2011)	"Pontoon" (2012)	"Tornado" (2012)

"Pontoon" is a song recorded by American country music group Little Big Town. It was released in April 2012 as the first single from their fifth studio album, Tornado. The song, written by Natalie Hemby, Luke Laird and Barry Dean, became the group's first No. 1 single on the Billboard Hot Country Songs chart for the week of September 15, 2012. The song won the 2013 Grammy Award for Best Country Duo/Group Performance.

== Content ==
Laird said that the idea for "Pontoon" came about when a publisher asked about a song that he and Hemby wrote for Miranda Lambert called "Fine Tune", but the publisher thought that it was called "Pontoon". After Hemby corrected him, the two thought that they should write a song called "Pontoon".

"Pontoon" is a mid-tempo song about having a party while on a pontoon. The song is in A major, with an A-D-A pattern twice on the verses, and A-D-A-E-A on the chorus. Karen Fairchild's lead vocal ranges from E3 to A4. It has an approximate tempo of 96 beats per minute.

== Critical reception ==
Billy Dukes of Taste of Country gave the song three and a half stars out of five, writing that "those who invest time to pull apart the layers of this lazy lake song will be rewarded with a new toy upon each listen." Bobby Peacock of Roughstock gave the song four stars out of five, saying that "Karen Fairchild's lead vocal has a heavy reverb effect, which mixes in excellently with the hi-strung guitar, drum loop, organ and[…]her three bandmates' earthy harmonies." He also thought that the lyrics "have a sense of playfulness that make the mere act of riding on a pontoon sound like a blast." Dan Milliken of Country Universe gave the song a C+ grade, writing that the "lyrics are so dull that, when paired with the weird reverb on Karen Fairchild’s vocal, they start to sound like a diary of seasickness."

The song was awarded with 2012 Single Of The Year by the Country Music Association and 2013 Grammy Award for Best Country Duo/Group Performance.

== Music video ==
The music video was directed by Declan Whitebloom and premiered in May 2012. It was filmed at Percy Priest Lake in Nashville, Tennessee.

== Chart performance ==
"Pontoon" debuted at number 51 on the U.S. Billboard Hot Country Songs chart for the week of May 19, 2012. For the week of September 15, 2012, "Pontoon" became Little Big Town's first number one hit. As of June 2016 the song has sold 2.66 million copies in the United States.

== Charts and certifications ==
=== Weekly charts ===
Chart (2012)	Peak position
Canada Hot 100 (Billboard)	39
US Billboard Hot 100	22
US Hot Country Songs (Billboard)	1

=== Year-end charts ===
Chart (2012)	Position
US Billboard Hot 100	67
US Country Songs (Billboard)	41

=== Certifications ===
Region	Certification	Certified units/sales
Canada (Music Canada)	Platinum	80,000^{*}
United States (RIAA)	6× Platinum	2,655,000
^{*} Sales figures based on certification alone.

== Parodies ==
- American parody artist Cledus T. Judd released a parody of "Pontoon" titled "Honeymoon" on his 2012 album Parodyziac!!.
