= Only Prettier =

2010 single by Miranda Lambert

Single by Miranda Lambert

from the album Revolution
- Released: July 26, 2010
- Recorded: 2009
- Genre: Country
- Length: 3:09
- Label: Columbia Nashville
- Songwriter(s): Natalie Hemby; Miranda Lambert
- Producer(s): Frank Liddell; Mike Wrucke

Miranda Lambert singles chronology
"The House That Built Me" (2010)	"Only Prettier" (2010)	"Coal Miner's Daughter" (2010)

Music video
- "Only Prettier" on YouTube

"Only Prettier" is a song co-written and recorded by American country music artist Miranda Lambert. It was released in July 2010 as the fourth single from her album Revolution. Co-written with Natalie Hemby, the song has both a country girl and city girl facing each other over the differences of their respective lifestyles, coming to an agreement that they have similarities but the former says that she's like her "only prettier". Critics gave praise to Lambert's vocal performance and lyricism but were critical about the song's production.

"Only Prettier" reached number 12 on the Billboard Hot Country Songs chart, giving Lambert her seventh top 20 hit. It also peaked at number 61 on the Hot 100 chart. The accompanying music video for the song, directed by Trey Fanjoy, features Lambert along with fellow country artists Kellie Pickler, Laura Bell Bundy, and Hillary Scott of Lady A, in dual roles as both "good girls" and "bad girls" at a 1950s high school sock hop.

== Content ==
"Only Prettier" is an up-tempo song in the key of A♭ major backed by electric and steel guitars and percussion. The song's female narrator, a typical rough-and-rowdy country girl, finds herself facing off with a stereotypical city girl ("I got a mouth like a sailor and yours is more like a Hallmark card"). Although the song's verses find the narrator describing the differences between the two, she offers in the chorus that the two actually have quite a lot in common ("You got your friends, just like I got mine") and that they should put their differences aside ("So let's shake hands and reach across those party lines"). She gets the last word in, stating that "[country girls are] just like you, only prettier", but in the very last chorus, she states "I'm just like you, only prettier."

Lambert relates to the song as her own anthem: "It’s antagonistic in a fun way, and I loved the attitude behind it. It kind of fools you, because it’s got this really country, laid-back intro, but then it’s balls-to-the-wall the rest of the way. It’s so much fun!"

Co-writer Natalie Hemby told The Boot that she and Lambert wanted the song to be "clever." She referred to the lyrics as being like "a smack in the face, but you don't realize it. It's like wait ... did you just insult me?"

== Critical reception ==
The song received positive reviews from music critics. Blake Boldt of Engine 145 gave the song a thumbs up, complimenting that "once again, Lambert has bent the iron-clad rules of radio to bring us sharp material like this." He also commented that the "cleverness of her performance makes up for the clumsiness of the production." Kevin John Coyne of Country Universe gave the song a B+ rating, comparing it to Lambert's own "Dry Town" and complimenting the lyrics and vocals. However, he was not as impressed with the production, in which he felt "thrashing guitars drown out the steel guitar and come close to overshadowing a great vocal performance from Lambert."

== Music video ==
The music video for "Only Prettier" was directed by Trey Fanjoy and filmed in Joelton, Tennessee in June 2010, and premiered on VEVO on August 3, 2010. It features a 1950s theme and appearances by fellow country artists Kellie Pickler, Laura Bell Bundy, and Hillary Scott of Lady A in dual roles. In the video, Lambert and her friends portray two rival cliques — "good girls" dressed in formal white attire with blonde hair, the other as "bad girls" in more provocative dark hair and outfits — attending a high school sock hop. The "bad girl" alter-egos are shown doing things such as spiking the punch, stuffing their bras and smoking. Ultimately, both groups have a good time at the party. Additionally, Lambert is also shown performing with her band on stage at the event.

== Charts ==
"Only Prettier" debuted at number 45 on the U.S. Billboard Hot Country Songs chart for the week of July 17, 2010. After spending 24 weeks on the chart, it reached a peak of number 12 for the week of December 25, 2010.

=== Weekly charts ===
Chart (2010–2011)	Peak position
Canada Country (Billboard)	31
US Billboard Hot 100	61
US Hot Country Songs (Billboard)	12

=== Year-end charts ===
Chart (2011)	Peak position
US Hot Country Songs (Billboard)	96

== Certifications ==
Region	Certification	Certified units/sales
United States (RIAA)	Platinum	1,000,000^{‡}
^{‡} Sales+streaming figures based on certification alone.

== Release history ==
Region	Date	Format	Label	Ref.
United States	July 26, 2010	Country radio	Columbia	
