= Something to Do with My Hands =

Single by Thomas Rhett

from the album It Goes Like This
- Released: February 21, 2012
- Recorded: November 2011–January 2012
- Genre: Country rock
- Length: 3:20
- Label: Valory
- Songwriters: Thomas Rhett; Lee Thomas Miller; Chris Stapleton
- Producer: Jay Joyce

Thomas Rhett singles chronology
"Something to Do with My Hands" (2012)	"Beer with Jesus" (2012)

"Something to Do with My Hands" is a song recorded by American country music singer Thomas Rhett. It was released in February 2012 as the first single from his debut album, It Goes Like This. Rhett wrote the song with Lee Thomas Miller and Chris Stapleton.

== Critical reception ==
Billy Dukes of Taste of Country gave the song three and a half stars out of five, calling it "clever, but not so cheeky that the joke tires after a listen or three." Kyle Ward of Roughstock gave the song three stars out of five, writing that "it sounds great sonically and the catchy beat and melody mostly make up for a fairly clunky hook that only sort of works." The song received a C grade from Kevin John Coyne of Country Universe, who wrote that "what could’ve been cute and goofy in a sellin’ turnips on a flatbed truck way, ends up just sounding dumb and ridiculous."

== Music videos ==
Two music videos were produced for the song. The first, directed by Justin Key, premiered in February 2012. A second music video directed by Peter Zavadil premiered in April 2012.

== Chart performance ==
"Something to Do with My Hands" debuted at number 58 on the U.S. Billboard Hot Country Songs chart for the week of February 18, 2012.

Chart (2012)	Peak position
Canada Hot 100 (Billboard)	90
US Billboard Hot 100	93
US Hot Country Songs (Billboard)	15

=== Year-end charts ===
Chart (2012)	Position
US Country Songs (Billboard)	69
