= Bluebird Café =

Music club in Nashville, Tennessee, US

The Bluebird Cafe
- Interactive map of The Bluebird Cafe
- Address: 4104 Hillsboro Pike
- Location: Nashville, Tennessee
- Coordinates: 36°6′7.3″N 86°49′0.6″W
- Owner: Nashville Songwriters Association International
- Capacity: 90
- Type: Music venue
- Events: Country; singer-songwriter

Construction
- Opened: June 3, 1982; 44 years ago

Website
- bluebirdcafe.com

The Bluebird Cafe is a 90-seat cafe and music venue in Green Hills, Nashville, Tennessee. The cafe features acoustic music performances and receives over 70,000 visitors annually.

== History ==
Amy Kurland, a former waitress, opened the Bluebird Café on June 3, 1982, using an inheritance she received from her grandmother. Initially, it was intended to be just a café, but Kurland agreed to allow friends to provide live music. The café became a loud late-night location for Nashville musicians. After the café hosted a "writer's night" to benefit World Hunger Year, the event became a regular fixture at the café, giving local songwriters a chance to showcase their latest work acoustically.

In March 1983, future country star Kathy Mattea received a recording contract after playing at the cafe regularly for seven months.

In 1985, songwriters Don Schlitz, Fred Knobloch, Thom Schuyler, and Paul Overstreet formed a new setup in the cafe whereby four songwriters would play in the center of the cafe, facing each other.

After the female songwriters noted that most of the songwriters performing were men, in 1988, they launched "Women In The Round"; regular performers included Pam Tillis, Karen Staley, Ashley Cleveland, and Trisha Walker.

Also in 1988, Garth Brooks received a recording contract after a performance at the cafe, filling in for another writer who cancelled his performance and never showed up; he had been turned down by the same label a week earlier.

The cafe is a central feature in the movie The Thing Called Love (1993), the last film of River Phoenix.

In 1999, Turner South aired a program called Live from the Bluebird Cafe, which built awareness for the cafe.

The Bluebird Café Scrapbook, written by Kurland, was published in 2002. It is a history of the club, its writers, events, and employees, as told by the writers, employees, and other witnesses.

In 2002, the cafe received an Academy of Country Music Award for Night Club of the Year.

In 2004, Scott Borchetta of Big Machine Records offered Taylor Swift, then 14 years old, a recording contract after seeing her perform at the cafe.

In 2008, Nashville Songwriters Association International acquired the cafe from Kurland, who remained as an advisor.

Bluebird, a documentary about the club, was released in November 2019.

In September 2023, a musical theatre inspired by the café, titled Bluebird, was announced, to be developed by Wayne Kirkpatrick and Don Chaffer.

== In popular culture ==
The cafe is featured in nearly every episode of the drama Nashville on ABC.

"Bluebird Cafe" is a track from John Waite's album When You Were Mine (1997).

The cafe is also referenced in "Somewhere North of Nashville" (2019) by Bruce Springsteen.

The cafe is referenced in the Foo Fighters song "Congregation", released in October 2014. On May 7, 2014, Foo Fighters frontman Dave Grohl performed an hour-long surprise solo acoustic set at the cafe.
