= Nashville Songwriters Association International =

Trade organization

The Nashville Songwriters Association International (NSAI) is a 501(c) not-for-profit trade organization that works to help songwriters in three ways: through legislative advocacy, through education and advice about the actual craft of songwriting, and through teaching about the music industry, and how to best position a song for success within it. They own the Bluebird Cafe.

== Overview ==
The organization is the world's largest not-for-profit songwriters trade association. Established in 1967, with former singer-songwriter Lorene Mann as a co-founder, the membership of more than 5,000 active and pro members spans the United States and six other countries. NSAI is dedicated to protecting the rights of and serving aspiring and professional songwriters in all genres of music.

NSAI established "Songwriters Caucuses" in the United States House of Representatives and the United States Senate. In Congress, a "caucus" is a group of like-minded lawmakers who share a philosophical pre-disposition to support an issue. When NSAI has an issue before Congress, they have caucus members who will assist by co-sponsoring legislation, allowing songwriters to testify, and using the power of their offices and the media to represent the songwriter view.

== History ==
Up to 1960s, Nashville's songwriting community consisted of only a few dozen writers who received little credit for their achievements and whose royalty compensation was small, largely because of an antiquated copyright law. Additionally, outside of the then-existing performing rights societies ASCAP, BMI and SESAC, songwriter recognition was virtually non-existent.

In November 1967, over lunch at Ireland's Restaurant in Nashville, Eddie Miller (a 1975 inductee into the Nashville Songwriters Hall of Fame and founding member of the Academy of Country Music in Hollywood) encouraged fellow songwriters Buddy Mize and Bill Brock to begin an association for writers in Nashville. Mize and Brock loved the idea, and all three set out to make it happen.

Within a month, Eddie, Buddy and Bill were conducting the group's first organizational meeting at the Old Professional's Club on Music Row. The meeting attracted some 40 songwriters, including Liz and Casey Anderson ("The Fugitive"), Felice and Boudleaux Bryant ("Wake Up Little Susie"), Kris Kristofferson ("Me And Bobby McGee") and Marijohn Wilkin ("One Day At A Time"). These 40 became the founding membership of NSAI and began spending countless hours around Marijohn's kitchen table brainstorming, discussing and refining ideas.

Within a year, the Nashville Songwriters Association was chartered by the state of Tennessee as a not-for-profit trade association, and from that moment, NSAI went on by helping to revise antiquated copyright laws and to establish new intellectual property protection in the digital age, by establishing a network of over 90 songwriter workshops to provide local instruction at home and abroad, and by conducting several educational conferences and awards shows each year.

The NSAI has since grown into 4,500+ members. The association today promotes awareness of songwriters' cultural contributions (through events such as Tin Pan South Songwriters Festival), champions the legal rights of professional songwriters and helps develop the abilities of aspiring songwriters. Though based in Nashville, NSAI represents all musical genres and includes songwriters from across the United States and overseas.

== Federal court cases ==
Eldred vs. Ashcroft — NSAI filed an "amicus brief" with the United States Supreme Court in a case that determined how long you and your heirs will own your copyrights. NSAI was the only songwriter organization to meet with the Justice Department attorneys, arguing the case on behalf of copyright owners. NSAI songwriter and Constitutional scholar Peter McCann researched the diaries of founding father James Madison. Madison authored Section 1, Article 8 of the United States Constitution that says: "Congress may grant, for a 'limited time', to authors and composers…" At issue was the definition of "limited time." McCann found that Madison intended for his own diaries to be published after his death by his family, for profit. This compelling argument influenced the Supreme Court's decision in favor of copyright owners and their heirs.

== See also ==
- Barbershop Harmony Society
- Magdalene program
- The Salvation Army Nashville Area Command
- Nashville Children's Theatre
