= White Liar =

Single by Miranda Lambert

from the album Revolution
- Released: August 17, 2009
- Recorded: 2009
- Genre: Country
- Length: 4:47 (Album Version); 3:48 (Radio Edit)
- Label: Columbia Nashville
- Songwriters: Natalie Hemby; Miranda Lambert
- Producers: Frank Liddell; Mike Wrucke

Miranda Lambert singles chronology
"Dead Flowers" (2009)	"White Liar" (2009)	"The House That Built Me" (2010)

Music video
- "White Liar" on YouTube

"White Liar" is a song co-written and recorded by American country music artist Miranda Lambert. It was released in August 2009 as the second single from her album Revolution. Lambert performed "White Liar" on The Ellen DeGeneres Show on October 6, 2009, and on the 2009 CMA Awards on November 11, 2009. In December 2009, the song became Lambert's second Top 10 hit and reached a peak of number 2 on the U.S. Billboard Hot Country Songs chart for the week of February 6, 2010. The song was written by Lambert and Natalie Hemby.

Lambert donated the original, handwritten copy of "White Liar" to the Country Music Hall of Fame and Museum for public display behind a glass case.

== Content ==
"White Liar" is a moderate up-tempo song in the key of F major with a flattened 7th backed primarily by steel guitar. The female narrator in the song describes confronting her man for cheating, whom she refers to as being a "white liar" for deceiving her.

== Critical reception ==
"White Liar" has received positive reviews from critics. Dan Milliken of Country Universe gave the song a B rating, stating that although "the melody and production are reminiscent of Little Big Town’s best rustic country-rock, and there’s a much more commanding hook here than “Dead Flowers” had, the effort is compromised by throwaway lines. The shortage of lyrical meat gives the song an “undeveloped storyboard” kind of feel, but the overall energy of the execution goes a long way toward making up for it." Bobby Peacock of Roughstock gave a generally favorable review as well, noting that the song "shows a sense of growth — a sense to become even more lyrically-oriented than on even her critically acclaimed first two albums" but adding that he considered the bridge undeveloped.

"White Liar" received three nominations (for Single of the Year, Song of the Year, and Video of the Year) at the 2010 Academy of Country Music Awards; of these, Lambert took home the award for Video of the Year. The song was also ranked number 11 on Engine 145's Best Country Songs of 2009 and number 35 on Roughstock's Top 40 Best Singles of 2009.

== Commercial performance ==
"White Liar" debuted at number 50 on the U.S. Billboard Hot Country Songs chart for the chart week of September 5, 2009; the song entered the Top 10 in its sixteenth week on the chart, reaching a peak of number 2 for the week of February 6, 2010, only behind "The Truth" by Jason Aldean. It later debuted at number 98 on the U.S. Billboard Hot 100 for the chart week of October 31, 2009. Following her performance on the CMAs, it jumped from number 66 to number 38 to become Lambert's first Top 40 hit on the U.S. Billboard Hot 100. The song also reached number 1 on the Mediabase Country Chart. It has sold 1,202,000 copies in the US as of May 2013.

== Music video ==
The music video, which was directed by Chris Hicky, made its premiere during CMT's Big New Music Weekend on October 2, 2009. The video is set at Lambert's wedding; as she walks down the aisle, she passes numerous women all of whom her groom (Gerad Albers) has cheated on her with. When she reaches the altar, she announces that she had been lying too, and runs off with the best man (Greg Sestero). The video features a cameo appearance of Jamey Johnson as the preacher. Lambert's parents and band members were among the wedding guests, and Lambert's long-time friend, Lacey, was the maid of honor.

"White Liar" debuted at number 10 on CMT's Top Twenty Countdown for the week of October 16, 2009; it has since reached number 1 for the week of February 12, 2010. It debuted at number 4 on GAC's Top 20 Countdown for the week of October 30, 2009.

== Charts ==
=== Weekly charts ===
Chart (2009–2010)	Peak position
Canada Hot 100 (Billboard)	67
Canada Country (Billboard)	2
US Billboard Hot 100	38
US Hot Country Songs (Billboard)	2

=== Year-end charts ===
Chart (2010)	Peak position
US Hot Country Songs (Billboard)	45

== Certifications ==
Region	Certification	Certified units/sales
United States (RIAA)	2× Platinum	2,000,000^{‡}
^{‡} Sales+streaming figures based on certification alone.

== Awards and nominations ==
Award	Category	Result
45th ACM Awards	Single of the Year	Nominated
45th ACM Awards	Song of the Year	Nominated
45th ACM Awards	Music Video of the Year	Won
2010 CMT Music Awards	Video of the Year	Nominated
2010 CMT Music Awards	Female Video of the Year	Won
44th CMA Awards	Music Video of the Year	Nominated
44th CMA Awards	Single of the Year	Nominated
44th CMA Awards	Song of the Year	Nominated
