= Jay Joyce =

American singer-songwriter

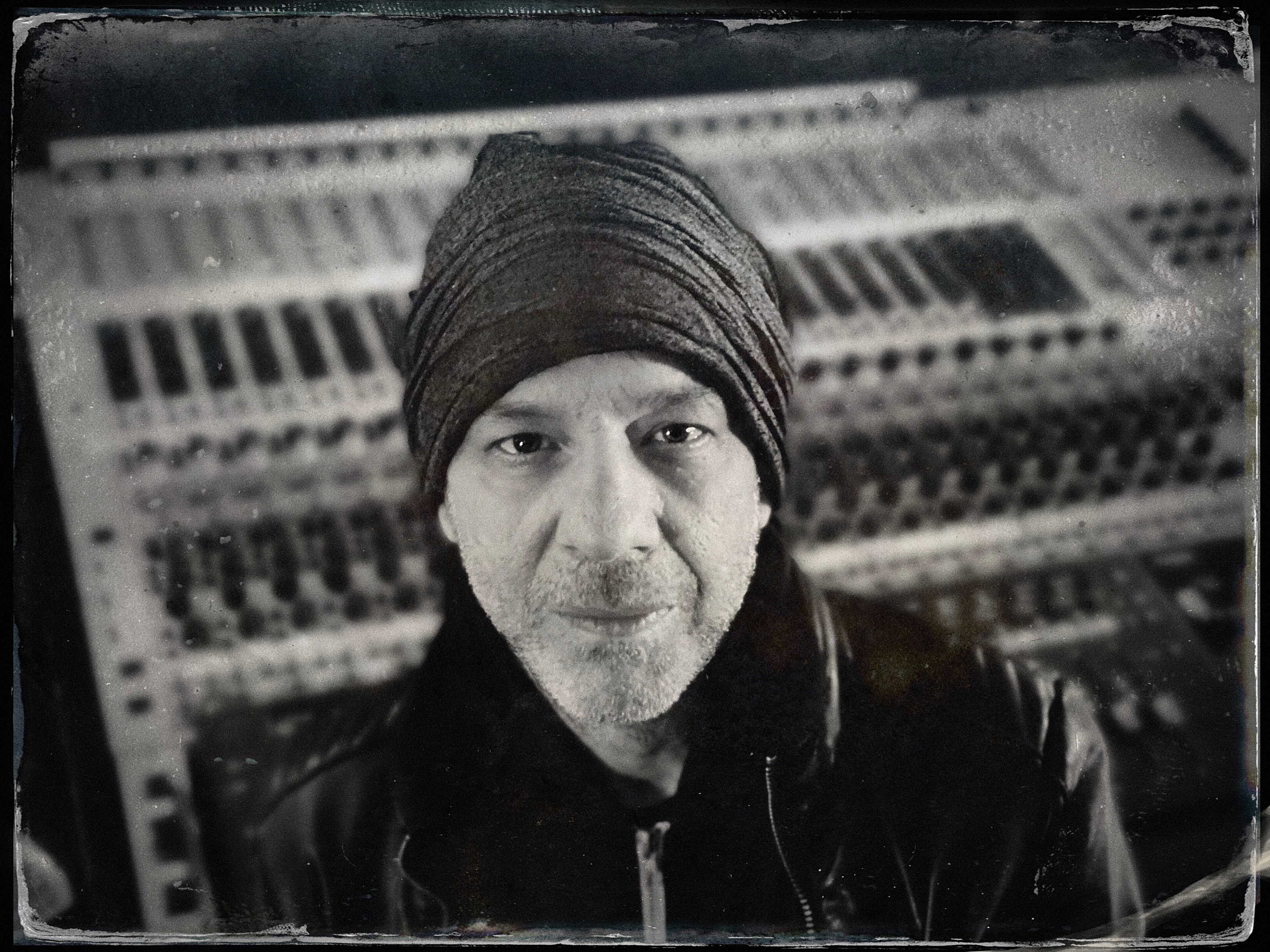

Background information
- Born: John Joseph Joyce; Cleveland, Ohio, U.S.
- Origin: Nashville, Tennessee
- Genres: Rock; country
- Occupations: Record producer; guitarist; songwriter
- Instruments: Guitar; bass; drums; keyboard
- Years active: 1986–present

John Joseph "Jay" Joyce is an American record producer, songwriter and session musician. In the 1990s, Joyce, with Chris Feinstein and Brad Pemberton, recorded and toured as Iodine. He also fronted the band Bedlam, featured on the soundtrack to the Tarantino movie Reservoir Dogs. and began working as a record producer, working with artists such as The Wallflowers, Tim Finn, Emmylou Harris, Patty Griffin, White Reaper, Lainey Wilson and Cage the Elephant. In the 2000s, Joyce began producing for Eric Church, Halestorm, Zac Brown Band, Brandy Clark, Amos Lee, Declan McKenna, Fidlar and Little Big Town. He has also played guitar for Crowded House, The Wallflowers, John Hiatt, Iggy Pop, Brendan Benson and Macy Gray.

In recent years the Grammy Award-Winning Producer of the Year has worked with Keith Urban, Carrie Underwood, Brothers Osborne and Miranda Lambert, as well as played a major role in helping newcomers Ashley McBryde, LANCO, Devin Dawson and Tenille Townes find unique sounds and hone their songwriting abilities. In 2014 Joyce partnered with Warner/Chappell to establish Neon Cross Music, a publishing company with a roster of rock, pop and country artists and writers.

Joyce has also received four CMA Awards and five ACM Awards including Producer of the Year. In 2018, rock critic Rob Harvilla of The Ringer named Joyce "the most influential—and hardest-rocking—man in Country music."

== Discography ==
=== Songwriting discography ===
Year	Artist	Album	Song	Co-written with
1999	Chantal Kreviazuk	Colour Moving and Still	"Before You"	Chantal Kreviazuk
1999	Shelby Lynne	I Am Shelby Lynne	"Dream Some"	Shelby Lynne, Dorothy Overstreet
2004	Marc Broussard	Carencro	"Save Me"	Marc Broussard
2004	Low Millions	Ex-Girlfriends	"Here She Comes"	Adam Cohen
2004	Liam Titcomb	Liam Titcomb	"Cross Yourself"	
2004	Tift Merritt	Tambourine	"Wait It Out"	Tift Merritt
2005	Faith Hill	Fireflies	"The Lucky One"	Brad Warren, Brett Warren
2009	Love and Theft	World Wide Open	"Freedom"	Stephen Barker Liles, Brad Warren, Brett Warren
2011	Emmylou Harris	Hard Bargain	"Cross Yourself"	
2012	Little Big Town	Tornado	"Leavin' In Your Eyes"	Jimi Westbrook, Karen Fairchild, Kimberly Schlapman, Brett Warren, Brad Warren
2013	Thomas Rhett	It Goes Like This	"All-American Middle Class White Boy"	Thomas Rhett, Brett Warren, Brad Warren
2013	Keith Urban	Fuse	"Lucky Charm"	Keith Urban, Jeremy Spillman
2014	Little Big Town	Pain Killer	"Good People"	Natalie Hemby, Jeremy Spillman
2014	Little Big Town	Pain Killer	"Turn the Light On"	Karen Fairchild, Jimi Westbrook, Phillip Sweet, Kimberly Schlapman, Natalie Hemby, Jeremy Spillman
2014	Little Big Town	Pain Killer	"Silver and Gold"	Karen Fairchild, Kimberly Schlapman, Jedd Hughes

=== Production discography ===
Year	Artist	Album	Song(s)
1998	Patty Griffin	Flaming Red	All tracks except "One Big Love"
1999	Tim Finn	Say It Is So	All tracks
1999	Chantal Kreviazuk	Colour Moving and Still	All tracks
2000	Rubyhorse	How Far Have You Come?	All tracks
2000	The Warren Brothers	King of Nothing	"King of Nothing"
2001	Tim Finn	Feeding the Gods	All tracks
2001	John Hiatt	The Tiki Bar Is Open	All tracks
2002	Rubyhorse	Rise	All tracks
2003	Shaye	The Bridge	
2004	Low Millions	Ex-Girlfriends	
2005	Screaming Orphans	Circles	All tracks
2006	Eric Church	Sinners Like Me	All tracks
2008	Cage the Elephant	Cage the Elephant	All tracks
2009	Eric Church	Carolina	All tracks
2010	Jonathan Tyler and the Northern Lights	Pardon Me	All tracks
2011	Cage the Elephant	Thank You, Happy Birthday	All tracks
2011	Eric Church	Chief	All tracks
2011	Emmylou Harris	Hard Bargain	All tracks
2012	Little Big Town	Tornado	All tracks
2012	The Wallflowers	Glad All Over	All tracks
2013	Cage the Elephant	Melophobia	All tracks
2013	Eric Church	Caught in the Act	All tracks
2013	Patty Griffin	Silver Bell	All tracks (co produced w/Craig Ross)
2013	Amos Lee	Mountains of Sorrow, Rivers of Song	All tracks
2013	Thomas Rhett	It Goes Like This	"Whatcha Got in That Cup", "Something to Do with My Hands", "Make Me Wanna", "Front Porch Junkies (Remix)", "All-American Middle Class White Boy", "Beer with Jesus"
2013	Keith Urban	Fuse	"Love's Posters Child", "Lucky Charm" (both co-produced w/Urban)
2014	Eric Church	The Outsiders	All tracks
2014	Little Big Town	Pain Killer	All tracks
2014	Randy Rogers Band	Homemade Tamales – Live at Floore's	
2014	Sleeper Agent	About Last Night	
2015	Eric Church	Mr. Misunderstood	All tracks
2015	Coheed and Cambria	The Color Before the Sun	All tracks (co produced w/Coheed and Cambria)
2015	FIDLAR	Too	All tracks
2015	Halestorm	Into the Wild Life	All tracks
2015	Carrie Underwood	Storyteller	"Renegade Runaway", "Dirty Laundry", "Smoke Break", "Choctaw County Affair", "Like I'll Never Love You Again", "Chaser"
2015	Zac Brown Band	Jekyll + Hyde	"Homegrown", "Bittersweet" (both co-produced w/Zac Brown)
2016	Brothers Osborne	Pawn Shop	
2016	Brandy Clark	Big Day in a Small Town	All tracks
2017	Little Big Town	The Breaker	All tracks
2018	Devin Dawson	Dark Horse	All tracks
2018	Brothers Osborne	Port Saint Joe	All tracks
2018	Ashley McBryde	Girl Going Nowhere	All tracks
2018	Mikky Ekko	FAME	All tracks
2018	Eric Church	Desperate Man	All tracks
2018	Rainbow Kitten Surprise	How To: Friend, Love, Freefall	All tracks
2019	White Reaper	You Deserve Love	All tracks
2020	Declan McKenna	Zeros	All tracks
2020	Brandy Clark	Your Life Is a Record	All tracks
2020	Miranda Lambert	Wildcard	All tracks
2020	Ashley McBryde	Never Will	All tracks
2021	Devin Dawson	The Pink Slip	All tracks
2021	Lainey Wilson	Sayin' What I'm Thinkin'	All tracks
2021	Eric Church	Heart	All tracks
2021	Eric Church	&	All tracks
2021	Eric Church	Soul	All tracks
2022	Orville Peck	Bronco	All tracks
2022	Zella Day	Sunday In Heaven	All tracks except "Radio Silence" and "Sunday In Heaven"
2022	Lainey Wilson	Bell Bottom Country	All tracks
2023	Chris Ryan and Jelly Roll	Single	"Scared to Go to Church"
2024	Lainey Wilson	Whirlwind	All tracks
2024	The Black Crowes	Happiness Bastards	All tracks
2025	Jon Pardi	Honkytonk Hollywood	All tracks
2025	Eric Church	Evangeline vs. the Machine	All tracks
2025	Molly Tuttle	So Long Little Miss Sunshine	All tracks
2025	Whiskey Myers	Whomp Whack Thunder	All tracks
2025	Rainbow Kitten Surprise	Bones	
