= Carolyn Wonderland =

American singer-songwriter (born 1972)

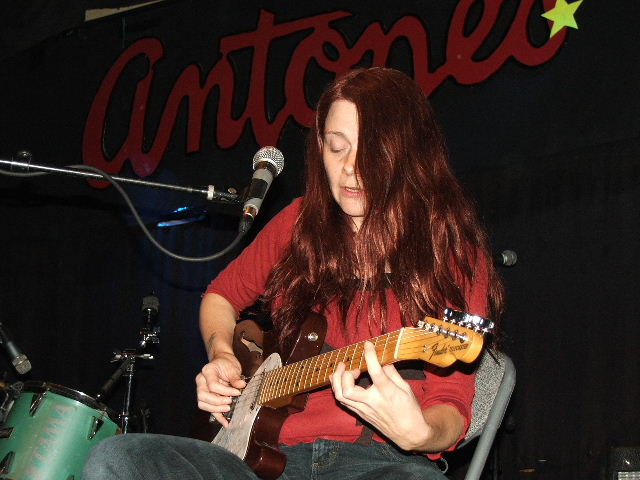
- Carolyn Wonderland performing at Antone's in Austin, Texas (2006).

Background information
- Born: Carolyn Bradford; November 9, 1972 (age 53); Houston, Texas, United States
- Origin: Houston, Texas
- Genres: Blues
- Occupations: Singer-songwriter, guitarist
- Instruments: Guitar, vocals
- Years active: 1990s–present
- Website: carolynwonderland.com
- Spouse: A. Whitney Brown (m. 2011)

Carolyn Wonderland (born Carolyn Bradford, November 9, 1972) is an American blues singer-songwriter and musician. She is married to comedian and writer A. Whitney Brown.

== Early life and education ==
Carolyn Wonderland was born Carolyn Bradford in 1972 in Houston, Texas, United States. Wonderland dropped out of Houston's Langham Creek High School to pursue her music ambitions.

== Career ==
During the early 1990s, she toured with her own group, Carolyn Wonderland and the Imperial Monkeys. In 1999, Wonderland moved to Austin, Texas; in 2001, she lost her apartment lease after her landlord became ill, and decided to live out of her van since she was spending more than 300 days a year on the road performing.

Wonderland's instrumental abilities include guitar, slide guitar, mandolin, trumpet, and piano. Although primarily a blues artist, Wonderland likes to incorporate elements of country, swing, zydeco, surf, gospel, soul, and cumbia into her musical mix. She usually performs with Cole El-Saleh on keyboards and Kevin Lance on drums.

In February 2008, Wonderland released the CD Miss Understood on the Bismeaux Productions label, and the title song has been on the Top 50 of the 'Roots Music Report' chart since the album's release. Fans of Wonderland's music include Bob Dylan and Ray Benson, founder of Asleep at the Wheel. Benson produced Miss Understood, and has been one of her songwriting collaborators. Wonderland credits several blues and Texas musicians as influences on her music. One notable influence is Austin singer-songwriter Terri Hendrix, as Wonderland covered two Hendrix songs ("I Found the Lions" and "Throw My Love") on Miss Understood.

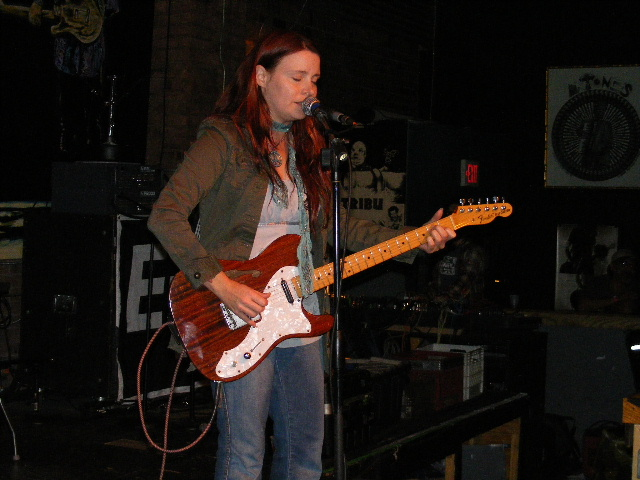
Carolyn Wonderland jamming at Antone's in Austin (2008)

Wonderland has been involved in a number of recordings, including several that were self-produced on independent labels. She was the lead singer fronting the band Imperial Monkeys. Wonderland released Bloodless Revolution in 2008, and is the primary singer on the Jerry Lightfoot's Band of Wonder Texistentialism CD with Lightfoot and Vince Welnick (Grateful Dead, the Tubes).

Wonderland was a founding member of the Loose Affiliation of Saints and Sinners (with Papa Mali, Eldridge Goins, Guy Forsyth, and others), with several of her songs being featured on their Sessions from the Hotel San Jose Rm. 50 CD. She was also the lead guitarist in the all-girl, southern rock band Sis DeVille (other members include Shelley King, Sarah Brown, Lisa Pankratz, and Floramay Holliday), and a founding member of the Austin Volunteer Orchestra.

Wonderland appeared on Austin City Limits in 2008, and has had her music used on NBC's Homicide and Fox's Time of Your Life. She was a headlining artist at the annual Rochester International Jazz Festival summer 2009 at the Eastman Theatre and New York. In 2003, Wonderland opened the Sturgis Motorcycle Rally, after performing there for the previous ten years, singing the national anthem with The Imperial Monkeys.

Wonderland also performs with the Imperial Golden Crown Harmonizers, raising money for local Austin charities, food banks, soup kitchens, homeless shelters, and on behalf of the legalization of marijuana.

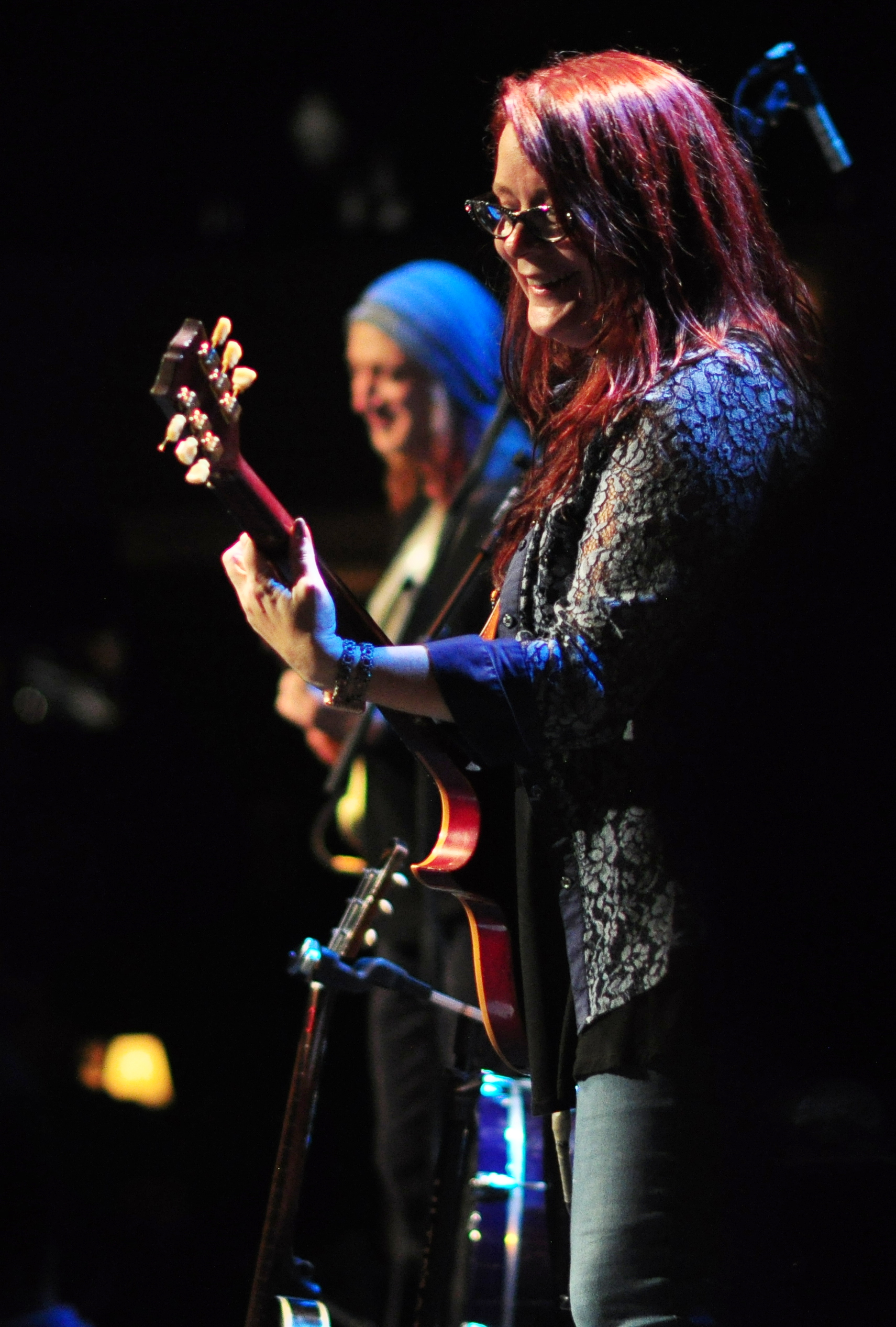
Wonderland (right) with John Mayall in 2019

On April 6, 2018, Wonderland joined John Mayall as his only female lead guitarist in his 60+-year career until his death in 2024.

== Personal life ==
Wonderland married writer-comedian A. Whitney Brown on March 4, 2011, in a ceremony officiated by Michael Nesmith.

== Recognition ==
Wonderland has won the following awards:

- Best Blues Band – 1996 Public News Music Awards
- Best Rock/Pop Album of the Year ("Bursting With Flavor") and Local Musician of the Year and Best Female Vocalist – 1997 Houston Press Music Awards
- Local Musician of the Year & song of the Year ("Blue Lights") – 1998 Houston Press Music Awards
- Best Blues Songwriter of the Year – 1999 Houston Press Music Awards
- Gold Award – Flagstaff International Film Festival – Music Video Awards – Alan Ames & Assoc. "Party on Houston" featured artist Carolyn Wonderland
- Best Female Vocalist – 2000 Houston Press Music Awards
- Best Blues Band – 2009 Austin Music Awards
- Best Female Vocalist – 2009 Austin Music Awards
- Best Female Vocalist – 2012 Austin Music Awards

== Discography ==
=== Albums ===
Title	Year	Artist Name	Label	Producer
Groove Milk	(1993)	Carolyn Wonderland and the Imperial Monkeys	Pulse/Montrose	Richard Cagle
Truckstop Favorites Vol. 2	(1994)	Carolyn Wonderland and the Imperial Monkeys	Pulse/Montrose	
Play with Matches	(1995)	Carolyn Wonderland and the Imperial Monkeys	Big Mo Records	The Imperial Monkeys
Bursting with Flavor	(1997)	Carolyn Wonderland and the Imperial Monkeys	Justice Records	Randall Hage Jamail
Blue Lights (CD single)	(1997)	Carolyn Wonderland and the Imperial Monkeys	Justice Records	
Alcohol & Salvation	(2001)	Carolyn Wonderland	Mix-O-Rama Records	Eldridge Goins
Bloodless Revolution	(2003)	Carolyn Wonderland	Indie release	Stephen Doster
Miss Understood	(2008)	Carolyn Wonderland	Bismeaux Productions	Ray Benson
Peace Meal	(2011)	Carolyn Wonderland	Bismeaux Productions	Ray Benson, Larry Campbell, Michael Nesmith
Live Texas Trio	(2015)	Carolyn Wonderland	Bismeaux Productions	Carolyn Wonderland
Moon Goes Missing	(2017)	Carolyn Wonderland	Home Records	
Tempting Fate	(2021)	Carolyn Wonderland	Alligator Records	Dave Alvin
Truth Is	(2025)	Carolyn Wonderland	Alligator Records	Dave Alvin

=== Collaborations ===
- Drink the Rain (2001) (indie release) Rebecca Cole with Wonderland
- Texistentialism (2001) Noah's Sky Music (indie release) with Jerry Lightfoot's Band of Wonder featuring Vince Welnick
- Sessions From the Hotel San Jose, Rm. 50 (2002) (Mix-O-Rama) with A Loose Affiliation of Saints and Sinners
- Fireside Songs For the Soul (2010) (licensed by Bismeaux) Wonderland and Guy Forsyth
- Nobody Told Me (2019) (Forty Below) John Mayall
- The Sun Is Shining Down (2022) (Forty Below) John Mayall

== See also ==
- Music of Austin
