= Tex Smith =

American musician

- Born: Arlington, Texas
- Genres: Country, folk rock, Americana
- Instruments: Guitar, vocals
- Years active: 2006-present
- Label: Whippoorwill Records
- Website: Official website

Tex Smith is an Austin, Texas-based American singer and songwriter. His style has been compared to Johnny Cash, Hank Williams, and Roger Miller.

== Biography ==
Smith was born and raised in Arlington, Texas, a suburb of Dallas–Fort Worth.

Upon graduating from University of North Texas in 1997, Smith moved to Dallas where he DJ'ed on local community radio station KNON on the weekly Rockabilly Revue show with Cowhide Cole, while also filling in on the Texas Renegade Radio show occasionally.

Smith moved to Austin, TX, where he began playing Kent Finlay's weekly Songwriter Circle at Cheatham Street Warehouse which would lead to his introduction to Seth Gibbs and Superpop Records in Austin.

In 2009 Smith recorded and co-produced his eponymous debut album with Seth Gibbs in Austin at Superpop Records. Contributing artists included Joe Thompson (guitar, banjo, mandolin, piano, vocals), Seth Gibbs (drums, bass, piano), Pete Stafford (lap steel, guitar), Stephen Brady Dietert (guitar), and Patrick Goforth (Guitar).

In 2010 Smith recorded To A Bird Singing Woe. Contributing artists included Pete Coatney (drums) of Jack Ingram's Beat Up Ford Band, Jake Erwin (bass) of The Hot Club of Cowtown, Seth Gibbs (banjo, bass, guitar), Joey Thompson (guitar, mandolin), Phillip Foster (piano, keys), Pete Stafford (lap steel), Bill Jeffery (trumpet), Tommy Hale (harmonica), Patrick Goforth (guitar), Stephen Brady Dieter (vocals), and Halleyanna Finlay (vocals).

Smith began playing Austin venues such as The Hole in The Wall, Saxon Pub, Jovitas, Sam's Town Point. In 2012 Smith recorded A Wayfarer's Lament. Contributing artists included Pete Coatney (drums), Jake Erwin (bass), Seth Gibbs (guitar), Joey Thompson (guitar), Phillip Foster (keys), Peter Stafford (lap steel, piano, guitar), Ramsay Midwood (guitar, vocals), and Patrick Goforth (violin).

In 2015 Smith recorded Pink and Black (Sings and Plays Songs About Love) and released on his own label Whippoorwill Records. Contributing artists included Pete Coatney (drums), Jake Erwin (bass), Nicholas Young (guitar), Simon Page (pedal steel), Whit Smith (guitar) of The Hot Club of Cowtown, Matt Thomas (guitar, steel guitar), Maybelle Crawford (vocals, guitar), and Gladys Rose (vocals).

In 2016 Smith recorded Fair-Weather Friends in Lockhart, Texas at Troubadour Studios with producer and artist Steven Collins of Deadman and self-released the record on Whippoorwill Records.

In 2019 Smith recorded Kinfolk in Austin TX at Sweetheart Studios and released on Whippoorwill Records. Contributing artists included Earl Poole Ball (piano) most notably the piano player of Johnny Cash for 20 years, Pete Coatney (drums), Jake Erwin (bass), Simon Page (pedal steel, guitar), Maybelle Crawford (vocals), Gladys Rose (vocals), Seth Gibbs (mandolin, vocals), Matt Ford (guitar), Josh Buckley (guitar), and Tyler Wallace (vocals). Smith also collaborated with songwriters Seth Gibbs, Jon Chamberlain, Peter Stafford, Marc Hoegg, Nate Uhlmer, & Dan Shaw of The Tossers on Willy Vanilla's final album Gutted to the Studs, recorded in the same year.

In 2020 during the COVID-19 pandemic Smith self recorded two EP's: Sings The Lonesome Bob Dylan followed by Sings The Man In Black JOHNNY CASH covering the songs of Johnny Cash and Bob Dylan, as well as releasing the EP LIVE! At The Hole in The Wall.

== Discography ==
=== Solo albums ===
- 2009: Tex Smith
- 2010: To A Bird Singing Woe
- 2012: A Wayfarer's Lament
- 2015: Pink and Black (Sings and Plays Songs About Love) (Whippoorwill Records)
- 2019: Fair-Weather Friends (Whippoorwill Records)
- 2019: Kinfolk (Whippoorwill Records)

=== EP's ===
- 2020: Sings The Lonesome Bob Dylan (Whippoorwill Records)
- 2020: Sings The Man In Black JOHNNY CASH (Whippoorwill Records)
- 2020: LIVE! At The Hole in The Wall

=== Also appears on ===
- 2020: Willy Vanilla - Gutted To The Studs
