= Train Song =

Train Song may refer to:

- "Train Song", a song and 1966 single a-side by Vashti Bunyan
- "The Train Song", a 1969 single by The Flying Burrito Brothers
- "Train Song" by Pentangle from their 1969 album Basket of Light
- "Train Song", a song by Phish from the 1996 album Billy Breathes
- "Train Song", a song by Tom Waits from his 1987 album Franks Wild Years

== See also ==
- Any number of songs about trains
- "Play a Train Song", by Todd Snider from the 2004 album East Nashville Skyline
- Trainsong, a 1988 novel by Jan Kerouac
