= Lone Star Music =

Texas, United States music company

Lone Star Music.
- Company type: Private Company
- Industry: Music
- Founded: 1999 (New Braunfels, Texas)
- Headquarters: San Marcos, Texas, United States
- Key people: Zach Jennings (owner), Richard Skanse, (Magazine Editor), Melissa Webb, (Creative Director)
- Number of employees: 15
- Website: lonestarmusic.com

Lone Star Music, also called LSM, is a San Marcos, Texas-based music company which operates a website drawing half a million visitors a month, as well as a retail outlet in San Marcos, Texas and a glossy bi-monthly magazine focusing on Texas and Americana music.

== Founding ==
Lone Star Music was founded in 1999 by Chad Raney while living in New Braunfels, Texas, as an internet site dedicated to selling Texas music. Raney had had successful previous experiences as an entrepreneur. Most of the initial 1,300 artists were on independent labels. In December 2002 Raney found himself in the hospital, leaving Christmas orders un-shipped. Michael and Clair Devers, friends of Raney's, took over the operation while he was recovering. By mid-2003 Raney had made them both partners (49% of the company between them), allowing them to run daily operations while he stayed in Texarkana. In March 2004 a Lone Star Music retail store was opened in the historic Gruene district, which is located within New Braunfels city limits. A second retail store was opened in Kerrville, Texas in September 2007, but was closed the following year.

In 2009, Raney and the Devers sold the company to another Texas entrepreneur, Zach Jennings, who immediately began expanding both the online and physical store's inventory to include more Americana roots and rock music by artists from beyond the Texas and Oklahoma regions. In 2012, Jennings moved the physical store from Gruene to San Marcos, TX, re-opening as Superfly's Lone Star Music Emporium in September, 2012. Although the online LoneStarMusic retail site continues to specialize in Texas and Americana music, Superfly's store in San Marcos carries all genres, with a large selection of new and used vinyl.

== Recent activity ==
In 2006, Lone Star Music acquired Mavrik Magazine, a glossy, full-color bi-monthly magazine dedicated to covering Texas and Red Dirt Music. In September 2007 the name of the magazine was changed to LoneStarMusic Magazine. It is distributed free at venues, bars, restaurants and other locations throughout Texas and Oklahoma (along with a few other states). Since Zach Jennings purchased the company in 2009, the magazine — just like the online retail store — has expanded its coverage to feature articles not just on Texas songwriters and musicians, but artists from across the Americana and roots rock/folk spectrum.

== Artists carried by Lone Star Music ==
- Ryan Bingham
- Jason Boland & the Stragglers
- Wade Bowen
- Cross Canadian Ragweed
- Bleu Edmonson
- The Groobees
- Ray Wylie Hubbard
- Guy Forsyth
- Jack Ingram
- Waylon Jennings
- Chris Knight
- Stoney LaRue
- Micky & the Motorcars
- The Mike McClure Band (formerly The Great Divide)
- Guy Clark
- Townes Van Zandt
- Willie Nelson
- Reckless Kelly
- Red Dirt Rangers
- Randy Rogers Band
- Billy Joe Shaver
- Todd Snider
- Bob Wills
- Hayes Carll
- Terri Hendrix
- Barry Coughlin
