= Manny Gammage's Texas Hatters Inc. =

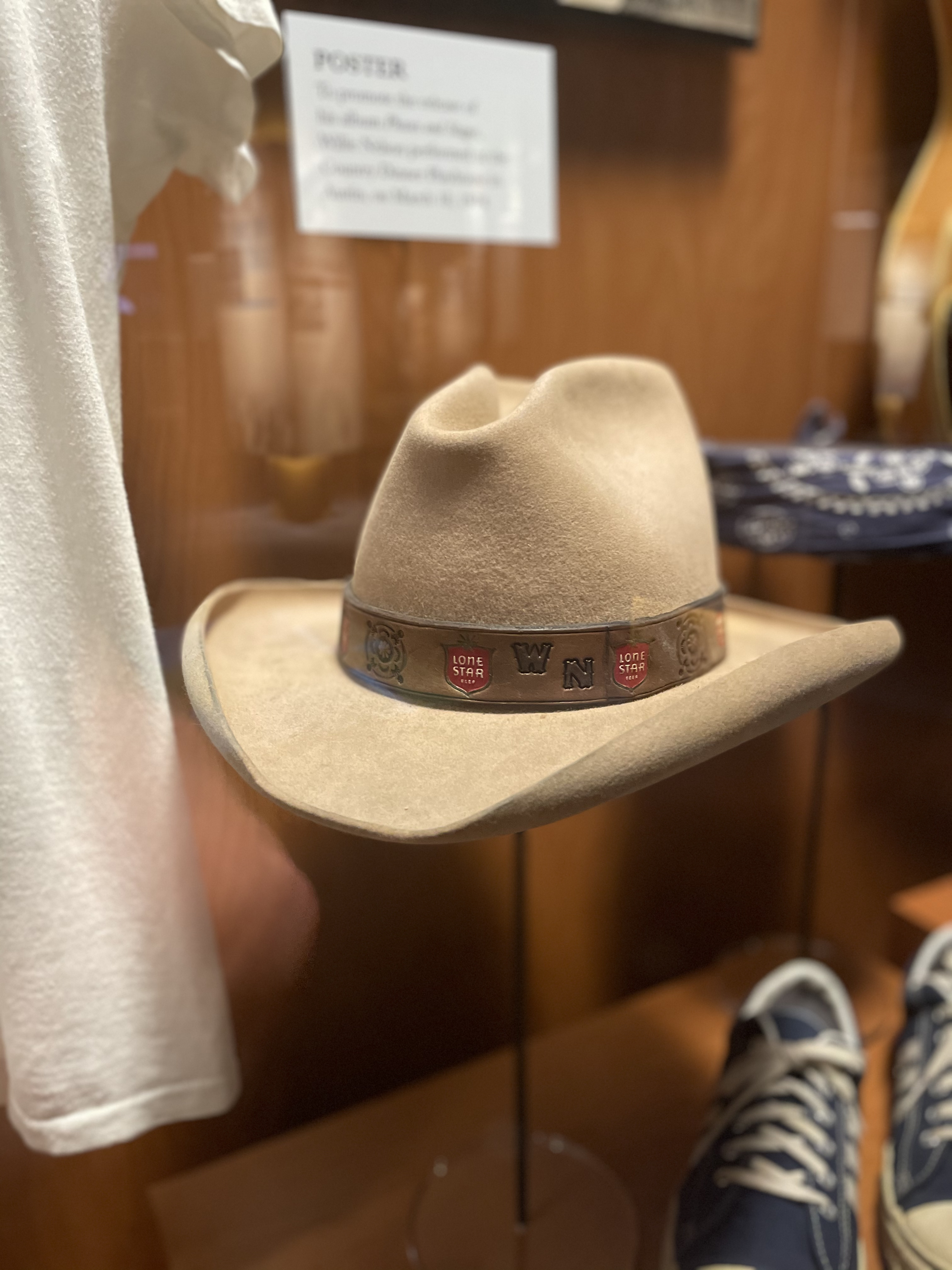
- Lone Star Dude model cowboy hat created by Texas Hatters for Willie Nelson (c. 1975), enshrined at the Country Music Hall of Fame
- Type: Retail
- Industry: Millinery
- Predecessors: Manny & Norma Gammage
- Founded: 14 October 1927 (99 years ago) in Houston, Texas
- Founders: Marvin "Pappy" & Leonora Gammage
- Successors: David & Joella (Gammage) Torres
- Headquarters: Lockhart, Texas, United States
- Products: Cowboy hats
- Website: http://www.texashatters.com

Manny Gammage's Texas Hatters Inc., also known as Texas Hatters, is a family-owned and operated hat shop and millinery specializing in fine quality handmade hats and hat restorations. Owned and operated by the Gammage family since 1926,the Texas Hatters has created custom hats for a variety of patrons, including many notable musicians, actors, presidents, and public figures. Signature styles invented by the Gammages include the "Hi-Roller" and the "Half-Breed". Texas Hatters creations have appeared throughout popular culture, in numerous films, and television series. The Texas Hatters shop is currently located in Lockhart, Texas.

== History ==
Marvin Gammage began the family tradition in 1927 as a hatter in Houston, Texas and his wife, Leonora, joined him later as college trained milliner. The business was officially named Texas Hatters in 1965 when Marvin and Leonora moved from Houston to Austin, with the help of their son Manny, who suggested the name.

In 1971 Manny purchased the business from his parents and brought in his wife Norma as partner and milliner. Manny had apprenticed with his father from the ages of 13 to 18, before marrying and spending eight years in military service, which included Vietnam from 1963 to 1964. After becoming owner of Texas Hatters, Manny became well known and loved in Austin and other parts of Texas and beyond.

Signature hat styles that originated with the Gammages include the "Hi-Roller", originally named by Marvin and later popularized by musician Ronnie Van Zant of Lynyrd Skynyrd and his brother Donnie of 38 Special. and the "Half-Breed", which features a straw crown and felt brim which was created by Manny while still apprenticed to his father, but so named in the late 1970s. Both Hi-Roller and Half-Breed are trademarks owned by Manny Gammage's Texas Hatters, Inc. as well as their logo and slogan, "We Top The Best".

Many of the hats featured in the popular miniseries Lonesome Dove were made by Manny Gammage, including the "Gus" hat worn by the character Gus McCrae portrayed by Robert Duvall in the film. Through this film Manny also became friends with and made hats for Bill Wittliff, Robert Urich and a number of other cast and crew. He was also responsible for the main character's hats in The Best Little Whorehouse in Texas, starring Burt Reynolds and Dolly Parton, and The Electric Horseman, starring Robert Redford and Willie Nelson and Ned Blessing: The True Story of My Life, starring Daniel Baldwin and 8 Seconds starring Luke Perry, where he was afforded the opportunity to work in the wardrobe department with one of his nieces, Melanie Armstrong Fletcher. Manny also created the signature hat of Stevie Ray Vaughan, the Plateau, now called the SRV and was friends and hatter to Jerry Jeff Walker, Hank Williams, Jr., Darrell Royal, Earl Campbell, Willie Nelson and many other persons, famous and not, throughout Texas and beyond. So strong was the friendship with Jerry Jeff that he wrote two songs for him, most notably, "Manny's Hat Song".

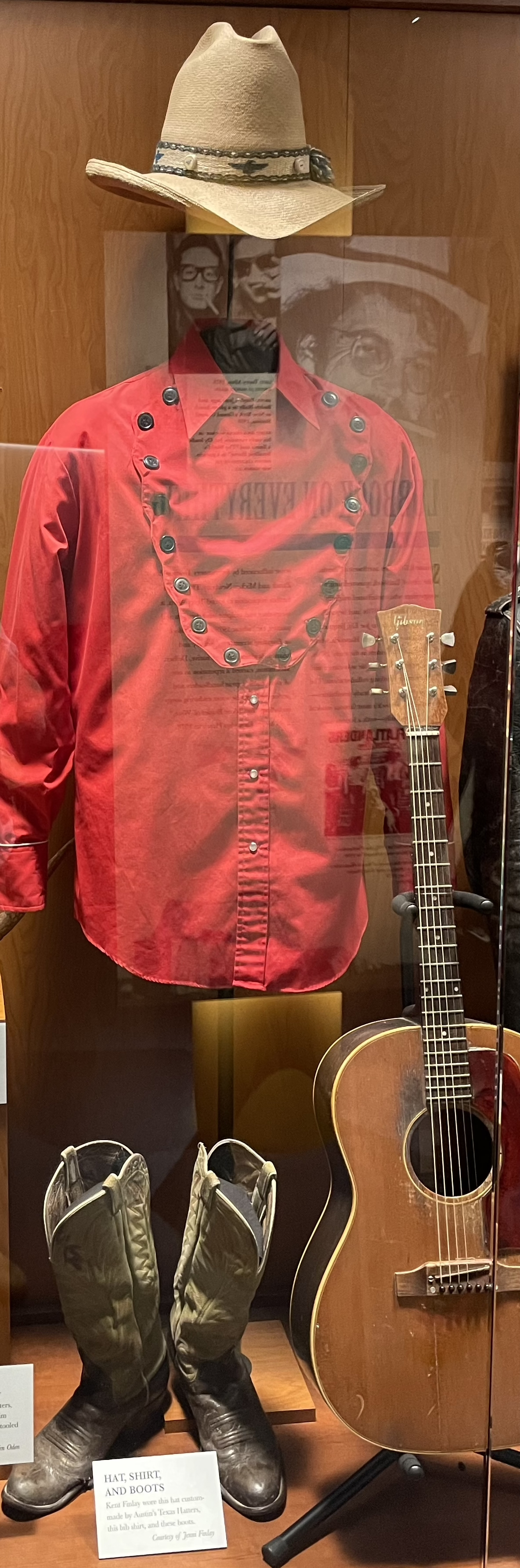
Custom Texas Hatters creation worn by Kent Finlay, with hat band woven by Ruffin Hill on exhibit at the Country Music Hall of Fame

Upon Manny's passing at the end of 1995, his half of the business passed to his youngest daughter, Joella, who was the only one of his and Norma's children who did not find success in either marriage or career outside the family firm. Becoming partner to her mother and president of the company at the age of 30 was not easy, especially as a single mother, but with the support of her mother and coworker (turned husband in 1998), David A. Torres, the company has remained alive well into its third generation. In the years since Manny's passing, Texas Hatters has made hats for Turner Network Television films such as Buffalo Soldiers, Rough Riders, The Day Lincoln Was Shot, The Hunley and Monte Walsh, which starred Tom Selleck. More recently, Joella created the hat for Jackie Earle Haley's character, Rorschach, in the film Watchmen (2009), and together she and David created hats for Pierce Brosnan both as Eli McCullough in The Son miniseries on AMC (2017-2019) and for his personal collection of cowboy hats, Other members of the cast hatted by Texas Hatters include: Henry Garrett, Paola Núñez, David Wilson Barnes, Carlos Bardem and the writer, Philipp Meyer, as well as several other cast and crew members. Texas Hatters has, or is currently, made/making hats for Garret Dillahunt and Jenna Elfman for their characters John Dorie and June in AMC's Fear the Walking Dead. Most recently, Joella and David can be seen in the film, The Cowboy Hat Movie on Amazon Prime.

Other notable wearers of Texas Hatters hats (for films, as gifts from the State of Texas or others, or personally purchased) include: music artists Bob Dylan, Waylon Jennings, Dolly Parton, Ray Charles, Kris Kristofferson, Johnny Cash, B.B. King, Ronnie Milsap, Ray Benson and Bo Bice, actors Clint Eastwood, Jim Nabors, Alex Karras, Peter Fonda, Susan Saint James, Barbara Stanwyck, Slim Pickens, Dyan Cannon, Al Lewis, Ann Miller, Mickey Rooney, George Kennedy, Farrah Fawcett. and U.S. presidents Jimmy Carter, Ronald Reagan, George H.W. Bush and George W. Bush, and Texas governors Allan Shivers, John Connally, Preston Smith, Dolph Briscoe, William P. "Bill" Clements, Mark White (also a distant cousin to the Gammages) Ann Richards, George W. Bush and Gregory Wayne "Greg" Abbott. There is an even longer list of U.S. and state members of congress and the house, on both sides of the aisle, who have worn Gammage creations. Others of international note: Prince Charles, Princess Diana, young Prince William, young Prince Harry, the king of Sweden, Carl XVI Gustaf, president of South Sudan, Salva Kiir and Formula 1 champion Lewis Hamilton received a hat designed and made for him by fourth generation hatter, Joel Gammage, as commissioned by the sponsors of the race, Pirelli, following his first-place performance at the Circuit of the Americas US Formula 1 Grand Prix in 2012. Others who received hats at that event include: ranking drivers Sebastian Vettel, Fernando Alonso and celebrity guest and racing legend Mario Andretti.

Although the press often uses "Stetson" as a generic reference to any cowboy hat, Texas Hatters has no relation to, nor do they carry in their store, hats made by Stetson. The Gammages are hatters in the old tradition, making each hat from an unfinished blank by hand.
