= Michael Stevantoni =

Canadian film director and screenwriter

Michael Stevantoni is a Canadian film director and screenwriter. He directed and co-wrote the feature film Salton Sea and later co-directed and co-wrote Death Letter Blues with Strack Azar.

== Career ==
Stevantoni is from Campbell River, British Columbia, and attended Carihi Secondary School. He later studied film production at Chapman University's Dodge College of Film and Media Arts.

While studying at Chapman, Stevantoni began developing Salton Sea, an adaptation of George McCormick's short-story collection of the same name. Stevantoni and producer Gia Rigoli acquired the screen rights to the book while the film was in pre-production. The film, initially exhibited under the title Desert Shores, was his first feature film. It received the Best Feature (USA) award at the 2018 Blow-Up Chicago International Arthouse Film Festival.

Stevantoni later co-wrote and co-directed Death Letter Blues with Strack Azar. The film screened at festivals including the Newport Beach Film Festival, Popcorn Frights and Panic Fest. Under its original title, The Banality, it was selected as the closing-night film of the 2023 Oxford Film Festival. It subsequently tied for Best Mississippi Feature at the festival. The film also won Best Narrative Feature at the Boomtown Film and Music Festival and Cinema on the Bayou Film Festival. Dark Sky Films later distributed the film.

Reviews of Stevantoni's films have discussed his direction and writing. Chris Olson of UK Film Review gave Salton Sea four stars, highlighting its slow-burn direction and use of the Salton Sea setting. Josh Bell of Crooked Marquee gave Death Letter Blues a B and compared Stevantoni and Azar's approach to the work of Flannery O'Connor and the early films of Jeff Nichols. Tyler Doupe of Dread Central praised the film's cinematography and performances while criticizing its pacing and unresolved elements.
