= Desert Shores =

Desert Shore or Desert Shores may refer to:

- Desert Shores, California, a census-designated place in California, U.S.
- Desert Shores (film), a 2018 independent film
- Desertshore, a 1970 album by Nico
- The Desert Shore: Literatures of the Sahel, a book by U.S. author Christopher Wise
