= Terri Hendrix =

American singer-songwriter (born 1968)

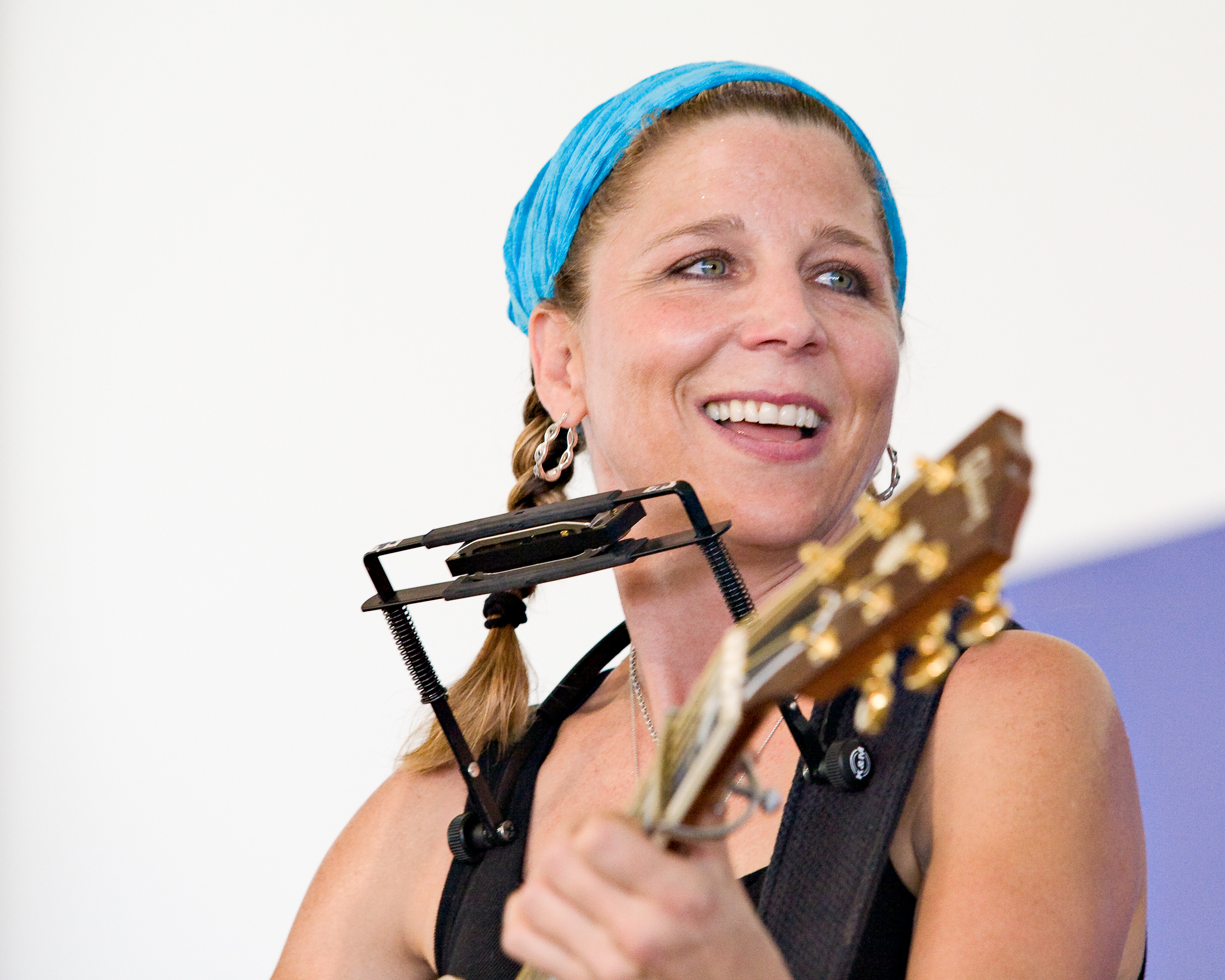
- Hendrix performing in 2012

Background information
- Born: February 13, 1968 (age 58); San Antonio, Texas
- Origin: Texas, United States
- Genres: Contemporary folk, Americana
- Occupation: Singer-songwriter
- Instruments: Guitar, harmonica, mandolin
- Years active: 1996–present
- Label: Wilory
- Website: www.terrihendrix.com

Terri Ann Hendrix is an American singer-songwriter, multi-instrumentalist, and independent artist who has been writing and performing an eclectic mix of Americana genre, encompassing folk, pop, country, blues, and jazz, since 1990. Since 1988 Hendrix has been based in and near San Marcos, Texas, living as of 2017 in nearby Martindale, after growing up in San Antonio, Texas.

Hendrix has released at least 20 albums and EPs on her own Wilory Records label, co-wrote the Grammy-winning instrumental "Lil' Jack Slade" by the Dixie Chicks, and, in 2011, published a book, Cry Til You Laugh – The Part That Ain't Art. Her second album, 1998's Wilory Farm, was produced by Lloyd Maines, beginning a long musical partnership encompassing studio recordings, live duo and full band performances, and several music and songwriting workshops.

== Influences ==
In various interviews throughout her career, Hendrix has cited such artists as Dolly Parton, Kate Bush, Paul Simon, Joe Ely, Terry Allen, Mississippi John Hurt, and the Alabama 3 as key music and songwriting influences, and Ani diFranco and John Prine as early inspirations for producing and releasing her recordings independently instead of through a traditional record company.

== Career ==
Known for her live shows and positive energy, Terri Hendrix says that she lives by the adage "own your own universe," a lyric from one of her earliest songs. After briefly studying opera and classical music on scholarship at Hardin-Simmons University in Abilene, Texas, the San Antonio native transferred to Southwest Texas State (now Texas State University) in San Marcos. It was while still a college student waiting tables that she began attending Kent Finlay's "Songwriter Night" at Cheatham Street Warehouse, eventually performing at other bars and restaurants around town and in nearby New Braunfels. By the mid-1990s she had built up a growing fanbase throughout the Texas Hill Country and in San Antonio, which enabled her to successfully self-release her 1996 debut album, "Two Dollar Shoes," on her own label Tycoon Cowgirl Records (soon after renamed Wilory Records). Her second album, 1998's Wilory Farm, marked the beginning of her long studio and performing partnership with noted Texas producer and multi-instrumentalist Lloyd Maines. Subsequent releases like 2000's Places in Between and 2002's The Ring expanded her grassroots fanbase well beyond Texas, leading to nearly two decades of touring throughout the United States and Europe. Hendrix recorded prolifically over those years, too, releasing several more albums on Wilory Records (all produced by Maines or co-produced by Maines and Hendrix). These include 2004's The Art of Removing Wallpaper, 2006's Celebrate the Difference (a children's album), 2007's The Spiritual Kind, 2010's Cry Till You Laugh, and the four thematically-linked full-length albums and one EP that she released between 2016 and 2021 under the banner "Project 5": Love You Strong, The Slaughterhouse Sessions, Talk to a Human, Who Is Ann?, and Pilgrim's Progress.

In addition to writing and performing, Hendrix conducts songwriting workshops both in and beyond Texas, and in 2012 she established the OYOU ("Own Your Own Universe") nonprofit, which offers educational and therapeutic arts programs, including for those who face neurological challenges or physical disabilities. The OYOU is headquartered at Hendrix's 12-acre property in Martindale, which she named "Wilory Farm" (like her second album) in honor of her late mentor Marion Williamson's own Wilory Farm in Stonewall, Texas. Hendrix was inspired to launch the OYOU in part by her own experiences as a professional musician living with and managing a seizure disorder, temporal lobe epilepsy.

In 2019–2020, Hendrix was diagnosed with essential vocal tremor, likely related to her epilepsy. Although this necessitated a scaling back on her touring schedule, she continues to write and record new music while also performing select live shows (mostly around Texas) and frequent live-streamed concerts from her home. She also remains very active running the OYOU, organizing festivals, concert series, retreats, kids music camps, and songwriting workshops, in addition to regularly working with other non-profit organizations such as those teaching music and songwriting to veterans and the disabled.

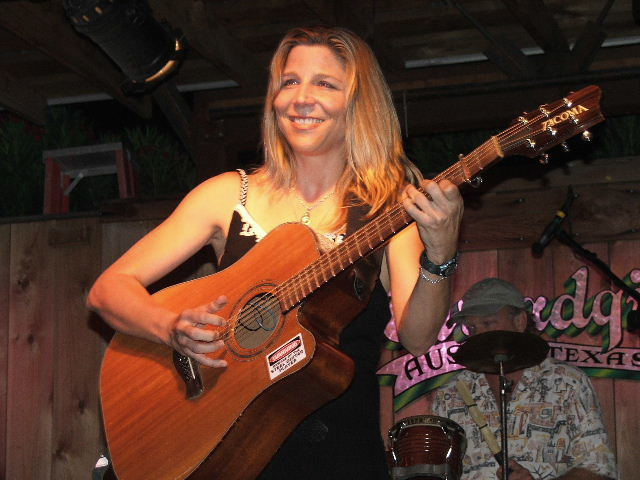
Hendrix at Threadgill's in Austin, TX (2006)

== Awards ==
- GRAMMY Award for Best Country Instrumental Performance, 2002, for co-writing the Dixie Chicks song "Lil' Jack Slade"
- Texas Music magazine
1. Top 50 Albums in Texas History – Wilory Farm
- Austin Chronicle Austin Music Awards Music Poll
1. Best Folk Act
2. Best Singer-Songwriter
3. Best New Band
- Austin American-Statesman Austin Music Critics' Poll
1. Best New Artist
- San Antonio Current Music Awards/Best of San Antonio
1. Best Folk/Acoustic and Best Country Band
2. Songwriter of the Year
3. Female Entertainer of the Year
4. Female Vocalist of the Year
- Honors
1. South Texas Walk of Fame
2. St. Mary's University Art of Peace Award
3. Distinguished Alumnus, Hardin Simmons University
4. San Marcos Women's Hall of Fame

== Books ==
- Cry Till You Laugh – The Part That Ain't Art (Wilory Records, 2010; revised 2012)

== Discography ==
=== Albums and extended plays (EP) ===
- Two Dollar Shoes (Tycoon Records, 1996; Wilory Records, 1998 - remixed & remastered)
- Wilory Farm (1998)
- Live (1999)
- Places in Between (2000)
- Live in San Marcos (2001)
- The Ring (2002)
- The Art of Removing Wallpaper (2004; remixed & remastered 2012)
- Friendswood and Beyond (live "official bootleg", 2004)
- Celebrate the Difference (2005)
- The Spiritual Kind (2007)
- The Spiritual Kind on the Road (live "official bootleg", 2007)
- Left Over Alls (retrospective, 2008)
- Christmas on Wilory Farm (EP; 2008)
- Cry Till You Laugh (2010)
- Love You Strong (Project 5.1) (2016)
- The Slaughterhouse Sessions (Project 5.2) (2016)
- Talk to a Human (Project 5.3) (2019)
- Who Is Ann? (Project 5.4) (EP, 2019)
- Pilgrim's Progress (Project 5.5) (2021)

All self-released on Wilory Records and produced by Lloyd Maines, with some co-produced by Terri Hendrix, except for the initial (1996) release of Two Dollar Shoes.

=== Compilations ===
- Highway Prayer: A Tribute to Adam Carroll (Eight 30 Records, 2016), "Red Bandana Blues" (Adam Carroll cover)
- Dreamer: A Tribute to Kent Finlay (Eight 30 Records, 2016) - "I'll Sing You a Story" (Kent Finlay cover)
- A Very Blue Rock Christmas, Vol. 1 (Blue Rock Performing Arts Center, 2013) - "Do you Hear What I Hear" (Regney Noel/Shain Gloria Adele cover)
- Absolutely Positively Getting Along (Big Brothers and Big Sisters of Bucks County/Cool Beans, 2013) - "First Place"
- This One’s for Him: A Tribute to Guy Clark – (Music Road/Icehouse Music, 2011) – "The Dark" (Guy Clark cover)
- Tucson Folk Festival/KXCI Compilation (Tucson Folk Festival/KXCI, 2011) – "Monopoly"
- Lone Star Sampler Volume 5 (Lone Star Music, 2010) – "Hand Me Down Blues"
- Freight Train Boogie 2: A Collection of Americana Music (Jackalope Records, 2009) – "Posey Road Stomp"
- Voices of a Grateful Nation, Vol. 2: Texas Country and Americana (Welcome Home Project/Icehouse Records, 2008) – "Motherless Children"
- Putumayo Presents: Americana (Putumayo World Music, 2007) – "Prayer for My Friends"
- Putumayo Kids Presents: Animal Playground (Putumayo World Music, 2007) – "Eagles"
- Sin City Social Club Volume 9 (Sin City Social Club, 2007) – "Jim Thorpe’s Blues"
- Kids Corner WXPN 20th Anniversary (WXPN Philadelphia, 2007) – "Nerves"
- Recording Artists for Hope: The Katrina CD, Vol. 1 (Wonderboy, 2005) – "My Own Place"
- Ten in Texas (Icehouse Music, 2005) – "Cowboy" (Betty Elders cover)
- Big Sweet Life: The Songs of Jon Dee Graham (Freedom Records, 2005) – "Something Moves" (Jon Dee Graham cover)
- 95.9 The Ranch Texas Music Series '04 (KFWR Fort Worth, 2004) – "Walk on Me"
- Texas Unplugged Vol.1 (Palo Duro Records, 2004) – "Clicker"
- KUT-FM Live Set (KUT Austin, 2004) – "Old Joe Clark"
- Broadcasts Vol. 12 (KGSR Austin, 2004) – "One Way"
- Don't Mess With Texas Vol.2 (Texas Music Project, 2004) – "It's About Time"
- Parkinsong Volume One: 38 Songs Of Hope (ParkinSong Foundation, 2004) – "Goodbye Charlie Brown"
- Damn It’s 2 Early: More Music From the Dudley & Bob Show (KLBJ-FM Austin, 2003) – "Wallet"
- Performing Songwriter: Editor's Choice Top 12 Independent Releases, Volume 10 (Performing Songwriter magazine, 2003) – "I Found the Lions"
- Latin Playground (Putumayo World Music, 2002) – "Lluvia De Estrellas"
- Open Doors: A Musical Project of Faith, Love, and Hope to Benefit Parkinson's Research (2002) – "Eagles"
- LJT's Texas Music Festival No. 13 Live (Larry Joe Taylor's Texas Music Festival, 2002) – "Wallet"
- Inside the Music of Texas — Vol. 1 (Texas Music magazine, 2002) – "It's a Given"
- Lone Star Sampler Volume 1 (Lone Star Music, 2001) – "Walk On Me"
- Kerrville Folk Festival: 30th Anniversary Video, Volume 1 (Kerrville Folk Festival, 2001) – "Invisible Girl"
- Moments of Grace — A.R.T.S. for People (A.R.T.S. for People [Dallas, TX], 2001) – "Moon on the Water"
- Mixed Grill: A Collection of Austin Music, Volume 1 (Texas Music Roundup, 2001) – "Flowers"
- Kerrville Folk Festival CD (Kerrville Folk Festival KFF2000 V1, 2000) – "Goodtime Van"
- Celebrating Rounder’s 30th Anniversary (Rounder Records/Continental Record Services, 2000) – "The Know How"
- LJT's Texas Music Festival No. 12 Live (Larry Joe Taylor's Texas Music Festival, 2000) – "The Know How"
- Travelin' Texas, Volume 1 (Institute for the History of Texas Music, Southwest Texas State University, 2000) – "My Own Place"
- Live @ The World Cafe, Volume 11 (WXPN Philadelphia, 2000) – "Places in Between"
- Blue Highways: The Ultimate Americana Music Fest (Continental Record Services, 2000) – "Gravity"
- Broadcasts Vol. 8 (KGSR Austin, 2000) – "Goodtime Van"
- Broadcasts Vol. 7 (KGSR Austin, 1999) – "Gravity"
- Live @ The World Cafe, Volume 9 (WXPN Philadelphia, 1998) – "Gravity"
- Landmarks (Continental Record Services/Rounder Records Europe, 1998) – "The Know How"
- SXSW Artists' CD (South By Southwest, 1998) – "Sister Song"
- KUT-FM Live Set (KUT Austin, 1998) – "Sister Song"

== See also ==
- Music of Austin
