= Ramsay Midwood =

American singer-songwriter

- Born: Woodstock, New York
- Genres: Country music, folk-rock, Americana music
- Occupations: Musician, actor
- Instruments: Guitar, vocals
- Years active: 2000–present
- Labels: Glitterhouse Records, Vanguard Records, Farmwire

Ramsay Midwood is an Austin, Texas-based American singer-songwriter and actor. His voice has been likened to Woody Guthrie, Johnny Cash, John Prine, and Bruce Springsteen, his lyrical imagery to Tom Waits, and his raw blues music to John Lee Hooker.

== Biography ==
Midwood born in Woodstock, New York and raised in Arlington, Virginia, a suburb of Washington, D.C. His father, novelist Bart Midwood who also wrote for Esquire, and his mother, painter Susan Kellogg, encouraged his musical interests.

After graduating from James Madison University in 1987, Midwood moved to Chicago and acted with the Steppenwolf Theater Company in a production of The Grapes of Wrath, playing both Al Joad and Floyd Knowles.

Midwood moved to Los Angeles, where he met guitarist Randy Weeks (Lonesome Strangers) who would co-produce Midwood's first album. Midwood and Weeks started the band Waynesboro.

He is also an actor and appeared in several films and television series during the 90s. He was also one of the original creators of the Slamdance Film Festival. After a film he starred in Joe's Rotten World was ignored by Sundance he joined forces with several other talented film makers and they started their own Festival Slamdance.

In 1998, Midwood recorded his debut album Shoot Out at the OK Chinese Restaurant. While driving to Arkansas to perform at the Jimmy Driftwood Tribute show Ramsay got a call from Glitterhouse Records a German Label and artist manager Gary Waldman wanting to release the record. It was initially released in Germany. Guest artists included Randy Weeks (guitar, banjo, harmonica, drums), Josh Grange (guitar), Brantley Kearns (fiddle), Skip Edwards (accordion, piano, organ), Rami Jaffe (accordion, organ), Matt Margucci (trumpet), Donny McGough (piano, organ), Kip Boardman (piano, bass), Sheldon Gomberg (bass), Don Heffington, Kevin Jarvis, and Nelson Bragg (drums).

The album was released in the United States with a slightly different set of songs in November 2002 by Vanguard Records. By then, Midwood had moved to Austin after his Los Angeles apt building burned down, he began playing at venues such as Sam’s Town Point, Hole in the Wall and The White Horse.

Midwood released Popular Delusions and the Madness of Cows on his own label Farmwire Music label in 2006. Don Heffington produced and played drums. Others helping out included David Jackson (bass), Kip Boardman (bass, piano), David Vaught (bass), Randy Weeks (guitar, banjo), Jake Labotz (guitar), Greg Leisz (lap steel guitar, mandolin), Danny McGough (organ), Phil Parlapiano (organ, accordion), and Jon Birdsong (tuba).

In 2011, Midwood released Larry Buys a Lighter, self-released on Farmwire and produced by Midwood and Weeks. Other musicians were Radoslav Lorković (accordion), Joey Thompson (bass, piano), Mark Hays (drums), Seth Gibbs (drums, bass), Wayne Chojo Jacques (fiddle), Kevin Russell (mandolin), Tony Scalzo (organ), and Justin Sherburn (organ, piano).

In 2022 Midwood appeared as Ed in the Southern Gothic mystery thriller Death Letter Blues.

== Discography ==
=== Solo albums ===
- 2000: Shoot Out at the OK Chinese Restaurant (Glitterhouse) released in the U.S. by Vanguard) in 2002.
- 2006: Popular Delusions & The Madness of Cows (Farmwire)
- 2011: Larry Buys a Lighter (Farmwire)
- 2024: Manchaca Eyeball (Live from Sam's Town Point) (Farmwire)

=== Also appears on ===
- 2000: Randy Weeks - Madeline (Hightone)
- 2007: The Gourds - Noble Creatures (Yep Roc)
- 2012: Tex Smith - A Wayfarer's Lament (self-released)
- 2015: various artists - Cold and Bitter Tears: The Songs of Ted Hawkins (Eight 30) - track 11, "My Last Goodbye"
