= Peace Queer =

EP by Todd Snider
- Released: August 19, 2008
- Label: Aimless
- Producers: Doug Lancio, Eric McConnell, Todd Snider

Todd Snider chronology
Live with the Devil You Know (Grimey's – Nashville) (2007)	Peace Queer (2008)	The Excitement Plan (2009)

Peace Queer is an EP by the American musician Todd Snider, released on August 19, 2008. It was made available as a free download before it appeared in stores. The Riverfront Times labeled the EP "a don't-let-the-door-hit-you adios" to George W. Bush.

Snider supported Peace Queer with a North American tour. He made a 43-minute movie as a companion piece.

== Production ==
Snider considered the EP to be a political record, with the caveat that one shouldn't take political advice from a "stoner." Because the songs didn't fit in with Snider's typical songs, he considered simply throwing them away. The album cover is a photo of a masked Snider being held hostage by a hippie.

"Fortunate Son" is a cover of the John Fogerty song, with Patty Griffin providing backing vocals. "Mission Accomplished (Because You Gotta Have Faith)" is built on the musical structure of George Michael's "Faith" and incorporates Will Rogers's most famous saying. "Stuck on the Corner" is about a man driven insane by the materialism of his family. "The Ballad of Cape Henry" was cowritten with Will Kimbrough. "Is This Thing Working?" is an allegorical song about the victim of a high school bully.

== Critical reception ==
Professional ratings
Review scores
Source	Rating
AllMusic	4/5 stars
The Austin Chronicle	3/5 stars
Boston Herald	C
Robert Christgau	(2-star Honorable Mention)
Spin	8/10
The Sunday Times	4/5 stars

The New Yorker wrote that Snider's "brilliant brand of rambling, homespun comedy is in fine form on the title track." The Independent deemed the EP "a gorgeously atmospheric experience, from its opening acoustic Bo Diddleyisms via its unaccompanied versifications to its blues." The Dallas Observer stated that "Snider has always incorporated wit and a leftist political bent into his folk/country, but about half of Peace Queer comes off as heavy-handed and predictable."

The Associated Press considered Peace Queer "more funny than angry but passionate, too." The Boston Herald opined that the only worthy track was "Stuck on the Corner". NPR determined that the tracks "are heavy on melody and metaphor, mixing politically and socially disgruntled themes while maintaining Snider's stinging wit."

AllMusic called the EP "a short and bittersweet gem, a rant that's funny enough to make the venom sting all the more and a cry of protest with joy and compassion in its heart."

== Track listing ==
No.	Title	Length
1.	"Mission Accomplished (Because You Gotta Have Faith)"	2:36
2.	"The Ballad of Cape Henry"	3:48
3.	"Fortunate Son"	2:44
4.	"Is This Thing Working?"	2:18
5.	"Stuck on the Corner (Prelude to a Heart Attack)"	3:45
6.	"Dividing the Estate (A Heart Attack)"	3:38
7.	"Ponce of the Flaming Peace Queer"	4:40
8.	"Is This Thing On?"	3:11
