= Death Letter Blues (2023 film) =

2023 American mystery thriller film

- Directed by: Michael Stevantoni; Strack Azar
- Written by: Michael Stevantoni; Strack Azar
- Produced by: Sho Schrock-Manabe; S. Michael Nicholas; Sherman Augustus
- Starring: Sherman Augustus; Karole Foreman; Ramsay Midwood; Arianna Ngnomire; Keylor Leigh
- Cinematography: Thomas Taugher
- Music by: Daniel McClure
- Distributed by: Dark Sky Films
- Release dates: October 2022 (Newport Beach Film Festival); August 8, 2025 (United States)
- Running time: 78 minutes
- Country: United States
- Language: English

Death Letter Blues, originally titled The Banality, is a 2022 American Southern Gothic mystery thriller film written and directed by Michael Stevantoni and Strack Azar. It stars Sherman Augustus as a small-town Mississippi priest who becomes involved in the aftermath of the death of a teenager known locally as Feral Boy. Karole Foreman, Ramsay Midwood, Arianna Ngnomire and Keylor Leigh also star.

The film premiered at the Newport Beach Film Festival in October 2022 and played other festivals under its original title before Dark Sky Films released it in the United States as Death Letter Blues on August 8, 2025. Critics generally praised its atmosphere, cinematography and lead performance, with some finding its pacing slow and its ending unresolved.

== Plot ==
In a small Mississippi town, Father Moss, a priest struggling with his faith, arranges for a boy found living in the woods to be raised by a childless couple, Ed and Marcy. Eleven years later the boy, still known around town as "Feral Boy", is killed after a party in the woods. As Moss counsels the couple, he is also left a car and a letter of confession by a recently deceased parishioner, and begins to see parallels between the two deaths and his own recurring nightmares.

== Cast ==
- Sherman Augustus as Father Moss
- Karole Foreman as Marcy
- Ramsay Midwood as Ed
- Arianna Ngnomire as Riley
- Keylor Leigh as Jo
- Layton Miller as Feral Boy
- Woodrow Wilkins as Deacon Graham
- Diana Stevan as Ms. Webb

== Production ==
The film was Azar's debut and Stevantoni's second feature and was shot in the Mississippi Delta, with many of the supporting roles cast from the local community. Augustus also served as a producer. Thomas Taugher was the cinematographer and Daniel McClure composed the score.

== Release ==
The film premiered as The Banality at the Newport Beach Film Festival in October 2022. It went on to screen under that title at festivals including the Popcorn Frights Film Festival in August 2023 and the Woods Hole Film Festival in 2025, and won Best Mississippi Narrative Feature at the Oxford Film Festival.

Dark Sky Films released a trailer under the title Death Letter Blues in July 2025, and released the film in limited theaters and on digital platforms in the United States on August 8, 2025.

== Critical response ==
In Dread Central, the reviewer praised the film's cinematography and Augustus's performance as the tormented priest but found the pacing slow and the ending unresolved, with several characters' fates left unclear. Australian critic Jim Schembri rated it three stars out of five, calling it an atmospheric Southern noir that plays subtly with genre conventions.

In a column for Crooked Marquee, Josh Bell gave the film a B, comparing it to the work of Flannery O'Connor and the early films of Jeff Nichols while finding its storytelling somewhat muddled and its pace slow. Tim Cogshell of CineGods was more positive, describing it as a sharp piece of Southern Gothic storytelling with a touch of magical realism. Louisa Moore of Screen Zealots praised its command of light, shadow and atmosphere, while noting that its lack of full resolution might frustrate some viewers. Reviewing it at Popcorn Frights, Mike Campbell of The Scariest Things gave it four stars out of five, praising its cinematography and roots-music score and likening its contemplative approach to the films of Terrence Malick.
