= New Connection =

Studio album by Todd Snider
- Released: May 14, 2002
- Studio: Home Depot
- Label: Oh Boy
- Producer: R.S. Field

Todd Snider chronology
Happy to Be Here (2000)	New Connection (2002)	Near Truths and Hotel Rooms (2003)

New Connection is the fifth album by the American musician Todd Snider, released on May 14, 2002, on Oh Boy Records. Snider supported the album with a North American tour.

== Production ==
Recorded at Home Depot Studios, in Nashville, the album was produced by R.S. Field. Snider wrote 30 songs for New Connection. He delegated most of the music to his producer and the musicians. Kim Richey provided backing vocals. Will Kimbrough played guitar.

"Crooked Piece of Time" was written by John Prine, who duetted with Snider. "Waco Moon" is a tribute to Eddy Shaver. "Vinyl Records" is about Snider's ever-expanding music collection. "Rose City" was inspired by Snider's Portland childhood. "Close Enough to You" and "Easy" are love songs.

== Critical reception ==
Professional ratings
Review scores
Source	Rating
Dayton Daily News	B
The Encyclopedia of Popular Music	3/5 stars
The Post and Courier	B−
USA Today	3/4 stars

USA Today wrote: "Like his pile of records, Snider's New Connection is full of good listening and unlikely combinations." The Hartford Courant called the album "a cozy country-folk collection that nicely combines heartbreak, boozy tales and a few deep thoughts on life." The Philadelphia Inquirer considered the album to be "full of his typically ingratiating blend of smart-aleck wit and sensitive heart."

The Dayton Daily News wrote that the album "features some of the same sorts of trenchant insight and dark comedy that make Prine songs remarkable." The Post and Courier panned Snider's delivery, writing that "at times he almost sounds like he's dozing off at the microphone." The Boston Globe determined that "Snider is an original voice that pop fans should pay more attention to."

== Track listing ==
No.	Title	Length
1.	"New Connection"	5:20
2.	"Vinyl Records"	2:30
3.	"Rose City"	2:54
4.	"Beer Run"	2:43
5.	"Easy"	3:11
6.	"Crooked Piece of Time"	3:48
7.	"Anywhere"	4:30
8.	"Stuck All Night"	3:44
9.	"Statistician's Blues"	2:58
10.	"Class of 85"	3:35
11.	"Broke"	3:37
12.	"Close Enough to You"	2:41
13.	"Waco Moon"	3:49
