= Space Marines (film) =

- Directed by: John Weidner
- Written by: Rob Moreland
- Cinematography: Garett Griffin
- Edited by: Brian L. Chambers; Daniel Lawrence
- Music by: Randy Miller
- Distributed by: Republic Pictures
- Release date: July 28, 1996
- Running time: 95 minutes
- Language: English

Space Marines is a 1996 American science fiction film directed by John Weidner and written by Bob Moreland.

== Plot ==
In the future, space has been colonized. As humanity expanded, the Marine Corps evolved into the Space Force. Colonel Fraser, a former Marine officer turned pirate, leads his pirates in hijacking a new synthetic explosive. This explosive, both light and concealable, serves as an ideal improvised explosive device. Fraser takes hostages at a local colony to draw out an Earth negotiator, who is escorted by a Marine fire team under the command of Captain "Gray Wolf" Gray. Fraser subsequently takes the negotiator and the Sergeant in charge of the security detail hostage on his ship. Following a brief space chase, Fraser issues demands for gold in exchange for the negotiator's life. Colonel Fraser is ultimately killed by a new recruit, who shoots him through his own torso, resulting in the deaths of both individuals.

== Cast ==
- Billy Wirth as Zack Delano
- Cady Huffman as Dar Mullins
- John Pyper-Ferguson as Colonel Fraser
- Edward Albert as Captain Tom "Gray Wolf" Gray
- Meg Foster as Commander Lasser
- Blake Boyd as "Tex"
- T.J. Myers as Hologram
- Michael Bailey Smith as Gunther
- Ed Spila as Rodney "Hot Rod"
- Sherman Augustus as Rudy
- Bill Brochtrup as Hacker
- Kevin Page as "Lucky"
- James Shigeta as Ambassador Nakamura
- John Mansfield as Vice Minister Adams
- Sean Hennigan as Chuck

== Production ==
The film is one of the first written by Rob Moreland. It was shot in Dallas.

== Reception ==
The film received a mixed review in The Washington Post, writing it was very "silly but also cheerfully watchable". Video Movie Guide stated: "Fans of old sci-fi serials should love this retro" production, where "Billy Wirth shines as the gleefully maniacal villain" and conceded that "Moreland's script has the sense not to take itself too seriously." The film was also described as a "(c)heesy cable thriller (with) intergalactic marines", in which Weidner's direction did not "always succeed in making derring-do look believable".

Psychotronic Video found that "Although there are space ships and space battles, most of the slo mo deaths, explosions and gun battles take place in a James Bond type cavem/factory. Also with subplots, silicone packed hologram bar dancers and an especially weak ending." "The effects aren't all bad but otherwise this is a standard direct to video fare with a dull script peppered with the usual violence, explosions and gunfire", wrote Howard Maxford in The A-Z of science fiction & fantasy films. The entry for the film in Radio Times guide to science fiction contains a similar appraisal.
