= Shelley King (musician) =

American singer, songwriter, and guitarist

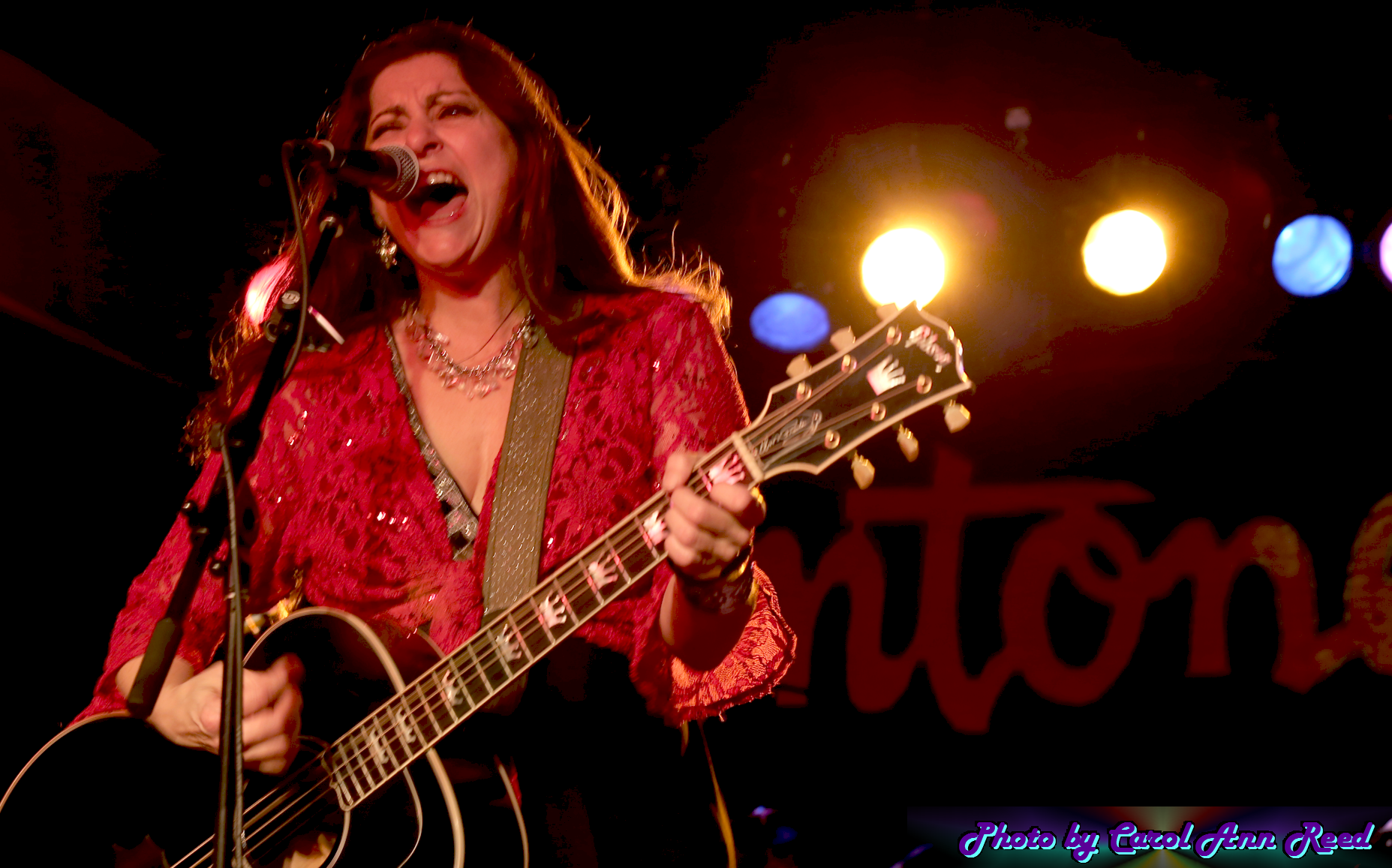
- King at Antone's in Austin, TX

Background information
- Born: Shelley King; August 30, 1966 (age 60); Little Rock, Arkansas, United States
- Genres: blues; roots-rock; folk music; country music; soul music; rock music; gospel music
- Instrument: Guitar
- Years active: 1992–present
- Label: Lemonade Records
- Website: www.shelleyking.com

Shelley King (born August 30, 1966) is an American singer, songwriter, and guitarist. She is known for the 10 albums she has released since 1998, touring and recording collaborations with Carolyn Wonderland, Marcia Ball, Cindy Cashdollar, and members of The Subdudes, as a songwriter for artists such as Nancy Sinatra & Lee Hazlewood, and Toni Price, and for becoming the first female artist and youngest artist to be recognized as the Official State Musician of Texas.

== Career ==
Born in Arkansas, she began singing in her grandmother's church choir at age four. Raised in both Arkansas and Texas, she attended Sam Houston State University. She began her music career in Houston, but moved to Austin in 1992 and has been based there ever since.

After playing in bands such as Riverchild and releasing several demos, King formed the Shelley King Band in the mid-1990s. She released her debut album Call of My Heart in 1998, and began gaining recognition as a songwriter when Toni Price recorded two songs from the album a few years later. In the early- to mid-2000s she won Austin Music Awards both for songwriting and for the Shelley King Band.

In 2008 King became the youngest musician and first female musician to be recognized by the Texas Legislature as Official State Musician of Texas.

In 2010 her album Welcome Home charted in the Top 40 on the Billboard Americana Album chart and was one of the Americana Music Association's Top 100 Americana albums of the year.

Her touring and festival appearances over the years have included Robert Earl Keen’s Texas Uprising tour, Redwood Ramble, Rhythm and Roots, New York Rhythm and Blues Festival, Old Settler's Fest, Iowa Women's Festival, Japan tours in 2009 and 2010, a 2022 Europe tour, coast-to-coast US tours billed as Carolyn Wonderland with Shelley King, and a 2024 tour co-billed with Dave Alvin, Jimmie Dale Gilmore, and Carolyn Wonderland.

Three cuts from her ninth album, 2019's Kick Up Your Heels, reached the Top 5 on Roots Music Reports's Top Country Blues Song Chart. Rolling Stone described the album as "deep gritty blues [with] fiery guitar and roof-rattling vocals." This album, and her tenth, 2023's Madam Mystic, included collaborations with artists including Marcia Ball, Delbert McClinton, Carolyn Wonderland, Cindy Cashdollar, and The Subdudes' John Magnie and Steve Amedée, and co-writes with Shawn Camp and others.

In the 2020s she toured with Carolyn Wonderland and Cindy Cashdollar and appears frequently on stage with both Wonderland and Marcia Ball. The Austin Chronicle wrote that "when Shelley King and Carolyn Wonderland combine forces, magic seems to follow."

== Songwriter ==
King's songs have been recorded by Nancy Sinatra & Lee Hazlewood, Toni Price, Marcia Ball and others. She has co-written with Sara Hickman, Shawn Camp, Marcia Ball, John Magnie and Tim Cook of The Subdudes, Floramay Holliday and others.

== Charity work ==
In 2012 King teamed with Ball, Wonderland and others to form Housing Opportunities for Musicians and Entertainers (HOME), a nonprofit that raises funds to help Austin music community elders with housing costs. HOME announced in 2024 it was growing from an all-volunteer organization to a staffed one with expanded activities.

== Awards and recognitions ==
- Austin Music Award (2001–2002) Song of the Year
- Austin Music Award (2004–2005) Best Roots Rock (Shelley King Band)
- Official State Musician of Texas (2008)
- Grant from the Texas Commission on the Arts Rural Tours Initiative (2023) to take live music to underserved areas of Texas

== Personal life ==
King lives in Austin, Texas with her husband, drummer Perry Drake. They have one son.

== Discography ==
- Madam Mystic (Lemonade Records, 2023)
- Kick Up Your Heels (Lemonade Records, 2019)
- Fan Faves (Lemonade Records, 2017)
- Building a Fire (Lemonade Records, 2014)
- Armadillo Bootleg #2 (Lemonade Records, 2012)
- Welcome Home (Lemonade Records, 2009)
- Armadillo Bootleg #1 (Lemonade Records, 2008)
- Rockin' the Dancehall (Lemonade Records, 2004)
- The Highway (Lemonade Records, 2002)
- Call of My Heart (Lemonade Records, 1998)
