= Sherman Augustus =

American football player and actor (born 1959)

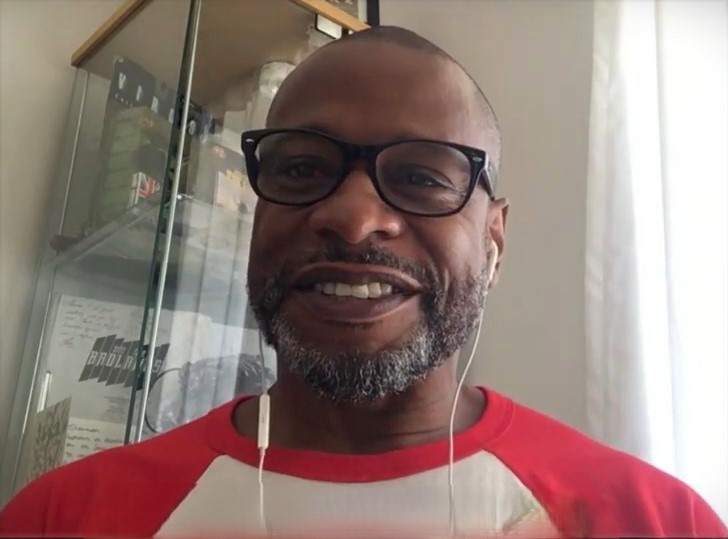
- Augustus in 2018
- Born: Sherman H. Augustus; January 10, 1959 (age 67); Los Angeles, California, U.S.
- Occupations: Actor, martial artist, professional football player
- Years active: 1988–present
- Football career

Career information
- College: Northwestern – St. Paul

Career history
- San Diego Chargers (1984)*; Minnesota Vikings (1984)*
- * Offseason or practice squad member only

Sherman Augustus (born January 10, 1959) is an American actor, martial artist and former NFL player. He is best known for his roles as Nathaniel Moon in the AMC series Into the Badlands and Lt. Colonel Jack Sullivan in seasons 4 and 5 of Stranger Things. Augustus played professional football with the San Diego Chargers and Minnesota Vikings, and previously played college football at Northwestern College in Saint Paul, Minnesota with Jimmy Bridges.

He is a 2nd Degree Black Belt in the martial art of Taekwondo.

== Early life ==
Sherman Augustus was born on January 10, 1959, in Los Angeles, California. Growing up, Augustus had severe asthma which made him afraid to leave home, so his parents enrolled him in flag football to help him overcome his illness and conquer his fears.

Augustus attended Dorsey High School in the 1970s. He later attended Northwestern College where he majored in criminology.

== Career ==
=== Acting ===
Following a knee injury that sidelined him, Augustus decided to retire from professional football and pursue a career in acting. Augustus contacted agent James Bridges Sr. and spent five years taking improv classes. In 1988, Augustus landed his first film role in Dennis Hopper's Colors. In 1996, Augustus played Rudy in Space Marines. On the set of the film, Augustus was approached by fight coordinator Philip Tan who encouraged him to pursue martial arts. In 2001, Augustus landed a role as "Well Dressed Black Man" in Gore Verbinski's The Mexican. During filming he caught the attention of his co-star James Gandolfini who had watched him rehearsing and called several agents to vouch for his talent.

From 2017 to 2019, Augustus played Nathaniel Moon in the AMC series Into the Badlands. Augustus was first introduced to the show during the airing of the first season in 2015, when his mother called him to ask him if he had seen the pilot episode, which he watched later that night. Disappointed that he had not been made aware of a martial arts television show, Augustus fired his manager and agent. During production of season 2, Augustus auditioned for the role of Nathaniel Moon with help from his friend, Tim Cogshell, and received a call informing him he had gotten the role four weeks later. He left on a flight to Dublin for filming the next day and didn't get the chance to read any scripts until he got on the plane. According to Augustus, the role was initially offered to Wesley Snipes but scheduling conflicts led to him being cast in the role instead.

In 2022, Augustus joined the cast of the fourth season of the Netflix series Stranger Things as Lt. Colonel Jack Sullivan. Augustus has stated that he received a call from the show's casting director Carmen Cuba in 2019, which prompted him to watch the first three seasons of the show in preparation for his role. Augustus based his performance on real-life African American military men Russel L. Honoré and Colin Powell. He has also described his character as "a man with tremendous gravitas but very few words" and compared him to Bruce Willis as John Smith in Last Man Standing. According to Augustus, after his first day of shooting the Duffer Brothers told him “Dude, that's exactly what we wanted. We want this guy to come in and not say a word and command this room".

In 2025, Augustus starred as Father Moss in the Southern Gothic mystery thriller Death Letter Blues. Also in 2025, Augustus joined the cast of the DC Universe television series Lanterns as John Stewart's father John Stewart, Sr.

=== Writing ===
In 2024, Augustus and Tim Cogshell co-created and co-plotted Daughters of Django, an independent graphic novel published by GenSeven Comics. The graphic novel follows Bapoto, Eloisa, and Antonia, three daughters of Django as they search for their father who has gone missing.

== Filmography ==
=== Film ===
Year	Title	Role	Notes
1988	Colors	Officer Porter	
1991	Camp Fear	Dancer #1	Video
1992	When No One Would Listen	Cop #1	Television film
1993	What's Love Got to Do with It	Reggie	
1995	Digital Man	Jackson	
1995	Rumpelstiltskin	John McCabe	
1996	My Son Is Innocent	Det. Mendoza	Television film
1996	Space Marines	Rudy	
1997	Mother Knows Best	Dale Cutler	Television film
1999	Virus	Richie	
1999	Avalon: Beyond the Abyss	Captain Matthew Norris	Television film
2000	Bread and Roses	Ernest	
2000	Kiss Tomorrow Goodbye	Limo Driver	Television film
2001	The Mexican	Leroy	
2001	Final Jeopardy	Mercer Wallace	Television film
2002	Zig Zag	Detective Jonathan Hawke	
2003	The Foreigner	Mr. Mimms	
2006	Thr3e	Detective Bill	
2008	Bad Guys	Eddie	
2009	Logorama	Michelin Man Mitch (voice)	Short
2017	The Neighborhood	L. J. Beam	
2017	Shards	Uncle Charles	Short
2019	'Til Death	Curtis	Short
2022	The Accursed	Officer Green	
2022	Death Letter Blues	Father Moss	
2026	Vampires of the Velvet Lounge	Cop Marcus	

=== Television ===
Year	Title	Role	Notes
1993	Murder, She Wrote	Officer Rossi	Episode: "A Virtual Murder"
1994	The Nanny	Doorman	Episode: "Fran-Lite"
1994–95	Chicago Hope	Paramedic	Recurring cast: season 1
1996	The Sentinel	Earl Gaines	Episode: "The Debt"
1996	Viper	Lt. Richard Gage	Episode: "Condor"
1996–97	Profit	Jeffrey Sykes	Main cast
1999	Star Trek: Voyager	Hij'Qa	Episode: "Barge of the Dead"
2000	NYPD Blue	Larry Watson	Episode: "These Shoots Are Made for Joaquin"
2000	Touched by an Angel	Phillip Jackson	Episode: "Living the Rest of My Life"
2000	Cover Me	Jaret Williams	Episode: "The Fever Flip"
2001	Philly	Leroy Stack	Episode: "Loving Sons"
2002–05	The Young and the Restless	Detective Hank Weber	Recurring Cast
2003	Threat Matrix	Sal Miller	Episode: "In Plane Sight"
2004	Without a Trace	Pete McCann	Episode: "Exposure"
2004	CSI: Crime Scene Investigation	Security Chief	Episode: "Suckers"
2005	NCIS	Captain Daniel Lemay	Episode: "Red Cell"
2009	CSI: Miami	Lyle Durbin	Episode: "Kill Clause"
2011	The Mentalist	Suge Lima	Episode: "Bloodsport"
2011	NCIS: Los Angeles	Michael Saleh	Episode: "Greed"
2012	Dexter	Benjamin Caffrey	Episode: "Helter Skelter"
2013	Legit	Prosecutor	Episode: "Justice"
2013	Bones	Joe Dinco	Episode: "The Blood from the Stones"
2013	Low Winter Sun	A.P.A. Tim Curtright	Recurring cast
2015	American Odyssey	Frank MacDonald	Recurring cast
2016	Westworld	Marshall Pruitt	Episode: "Dissonance Theory"
2017	Colony	FBI Supervisor	Episode: "Eleven.Thirteen"
2017–19	Into the Badlands	Nathaniel Moon	Guest: season 2, main cast: season 3
2019	Proven Innocent	Troy Dalton	Episode: "Acceptable Losses"
2020	NCIS: New Orleans	Jack Hardin	Episode: "Pride and Prejudice"
2020	Extraction	Davis Lawrence	Episode: "The Seafood Casserole Panacea"
2022–2025	Stranger Things	Lt. Colonel Jack Sullivan	Recurring cast: Season 4
2022	P-Valley	Cedric Haynes	2 episodes
2026	Lanterns	John Stewart, Sr.	2 episode
