= The Excitement Plan =

Studio album by Todd Snider
- Released: June 9, 2009
- Genre: Alternative country
- Length: 40:13
- Label: Yep Roc
- Producer: Don Was

Todd Snider chronology
| Peace Queer (2008) | The Excitement Plan (2009) | Live: The Storyteller (2011) |

The Excitement Plan is an album by alternative country singer-songwriter Todd Snider. It was released on June 9, 2009 on Yep Roc Records, and was produced by Don Was.

Professional ratings
Aggregate scores
| Source | Rating |
|---|---|
| Metacritic | 83% |
Review scores
| Source | Rating |
| AllMusic | 3.5/5 stars |
| The A.V. Club | A– |
| Los Angeles Times | 3/4 stars |
| MSN Music (Consumer Guide) | B+ |
| Paste | 8.4/10 |
| PopMatters | 8/10 stars |
| Rolling Stone | 4/5 stars |

== Track listing ==
1. "Slim Chance" – 2:49
2. "Greencastle Blues" – 4:11
3. "America's Favorite Pastime" – 3:12
4. "Doll Face" – 2:35
5. "Bring 'Em Home" – 2:33
6. "Corpus Christi Bay" – 3:57
7. "Last Laugh" – 3:49
8. "Unorganized Crime" – 3:20
9. "Barefoot Champagne" – 3:30
10. "Don't Tempt Me" – 2:59
11. "Money, Compliments, Publicity (Song Number Ten)" – 4:17
12. "Good Fortune" – 3:13

== Personnel ==
- Elvis Hixx – vocals (background)
- Jim Keltner – drums
- Greg Leisz – dobro, guitar (steel), vocals (background)
- Loretta Lynn – composer
- Eric McConnell – engineer, producer
- Michael Osheowitz – executive producer
- Todd Purifoy – photography
- Krish Sharma – engineer, mastering, mixing
- Melita Snider – paintings
- Todd Snider – guitar, harp, piano, primary artist
- Michael Triplett – design
- Don Was – bass (upright), producer, vocals (background)
