= Agnostic Hymns & Stoner Fables =

Studio album by Todd Snider
- Released: March 6, 2012
- Genre: Folk rock
- Length: 42:25
- Labels: Aimless Records, Thirty Tigers
- Producer: Todd Snider

Todd Snider chronology
Time as We Know It: The Songs of Jerry Jeff Walker (2011)	Agnostic Hymns & Stoner Fables (2012)	Eastside Bulldog (2016)

Agnostic Hymns and Stoner Fables is the eleventh studio album by American singer-songwriter Todd Snider, released on March 6, 2012 by Aimless Records.

== Critical reception ==
Agnostic Hymns and Stoner Fables received mostly favorable reviews from critics, its themes of economic inequality resonating with critics. Daryl Sanders described the record in The East Nashvillian as a “one-man Occupy Wall Street movement.” In his review for Rolling Stone, Jody Rosen called it “Occupy Nashville.” Writing in Relix, Jewly Hight said Snider “plays the part of a winking, pot-stirring anarchist” on the album. In a piece for NPR, Ken Tucker said, “If one line could sum up the album, it's ‘It ain't the despair that gets you / It's the hope.’" Both Rolling Stone and Paste named it one of the fifty best albums of 2012.

Professional ratings
Aggregate scores
Source	Rating
Metacritic	(79/100)
Review scores
Source	Rating
AllMusic	4/5 stars
American Songwriter	4.5/5 stars
The A.V. Club	B+
PopMatters	7/10 stars
Robert Christgau	A
Rolling Stone	3.5/5 stars
Slant	4/5 stars
Spin	8/10

== Track listing ==
No.	Title	Writer(s)	Length
1.	"In the Beginning"	Todd Snider	4:25
2.	"New York Banker"	Todd Snider	4:24
3.	"West Nashville Grand Ballroom Gown"	Jimmy Buffett	4:27
4.	"Precious Little Miracles"	Todd Snider	3:04
5.	"The Very Last Time"	Todd Snider, Will Kimbrough	2:52
6.	"In Between Jobs"	Todd Snider, Elvis HIxx	3:01
7.	"Brenda"	Todd Snider	4:55
8.	"Too Soon To Tell"	Todd Snider	5:13
9.	"Digger Dave's Crazy Woman Blues"	Todd Snider, Eric McConnell, Digger Dave	4:20
10.	"Big Finish"	Todd Snider	5:53

== Personnel ==
=== Musicians ===
- Todd Snider – lead vocals, acoustic and electric guitar, harmonica
- Paul Griffith – drums and percussion
- Eric McConnell – bass guitar
- Amanda Shires – violin and background vocals
- Chad Staehly - B3 organ
- Mick Utley – background vocals on “Too Soon To Tell”
- Jason Isbell – background vocals and slide guitar on “Digger Dave’s Crazy Woman Blues”

=== Production ===
- Todd Snider, Eric McConnell – producers
- Eric McConnell - engineer
- Brandon Henegar - mixing engineer
- Alex McCullough - mastering engineer
