= George McCormick =

George McCormick may refer to:

- George M. McCormick (1841-1913), American politician
- George McCormick (Canadian politician) (1856-1907), Canadian politician and lumberman
- George McCormick (footballer) (born 2005), English footballer
- George McCormick (lawyer), served as Attorney General of Texas and his former home is Texas Historic Lndmakr
