= East Nashville Skyline =

Studio album by Todd Snider
- Released: July 20, 2004
- Genre: Americana, folk rock, alternative country
- Label: Oh Boy
- Producer: Al Bunetta, Todd Snider

Todd Snider chronology
Near Truths and Hotel Rooms (2003)	East Nashville Skyline (2004)	That Was Me: The Best of Todd Snider 1994–1998 (2005)

Professional ratings
Review scores
Source	Rating
AllMusic	3.5/5 stars
Pitchfork	8.0/10
Uncut	4/5
USA Today	3/4 stars
The Village Voice	A

East Nashville Skyline is a studio album by Nashville, Tennessee, singer-songwriter Todd Snider. The album was released in 2004. It was ranked the 7th best album of the year by Andrew Gilstrap in PopMatters.

== Songs ==
The album contains a variety of songs, most of them concerning moments in Snider's past, such as his addiction rehab and various other troubles throughout his life. The song "Age Like Wine" is a retrospective of his life, and Snider recounts his jailing in "Tillamook County Jail". The song "Ballad of The Kingsmen" concerns the controversy surrounding their hit song "Louie Louie".

== Track listing ==
All songs by Todd Snider, except where noted.

1. "Age Like Wine" – 1:46
2. "Tillamook County Jail" – 3:07
3. "Play a Train Song" – 4:09
4. "Alcohol and Pills" (Fred Eaglesmith) – 4:38
5. "Good News Blues" (Billy Joe Shaver) – 3:13
6. "The Ballad of the Kingsmen" – 5:03
7. "Iron Mike's Main Man's Last Request" – 3:15
8. "Conservative Christian, Right-Wing Republican, Straight, White, American Males" – 3:17
9. "Incarcerated" – 2:10
10. "Nashville" – 2:26
11. "Sunshine" – 4:58
12. "Enjoy Yourself" (Herb Magidson and Carl Sigman) – 3:27

== Charts ==
Chart (2004)	Peak positions
Billboard Top Heatseekers	44
Billboard Top Independent Albums	28
