= Todd Snider =

American singer-songwriter (1966–2025)

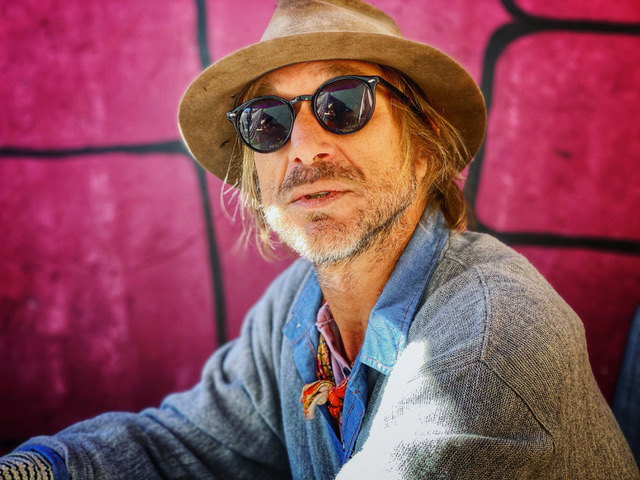
- Snider in 2020

Background information
- Born: Todd Daniel Snider; October 11, 1966; Portland, Oregon, U.S.
- Origin: Nashville, Tennessee, U.S.
- Died: November 14, 2025 (aged 59) Nashville, Tennessee, U.S.
- Genres: Folk; folk rock; roots rock; blues; alternative country
- Occupation: Singer-songwriter
- Years active: 1994–2025
- Labels: MCA Nashville; Aimless Records; Thirty Tigers
- Formerly of: Hard Working Americans
- Website: toddsnider.net

Todd Daniel Snider (October 11, 1966 – November 14, 2025) was an American singer-songwriter whose music incorporated elements of folk, rock, blues, alt country and funk.

== Early life and career ==
Snider was born on October 11, 1966, in Portland, Oregon, and grew up in nearby Beaverton, where he lived until he graduated from Beaverton High School in 1985. After high school, he moved to Santa Rosa, California, to attend Santa Rosa Junior College (SRJC). He attended for a semester and while there, learned to play the harmonica.

With help from his brother Mike who bought him a plane ticket, Snider moved northeast of San Antonio to San Marcos, Texas, after leaving SRJC in the late fall of 1985. Not long after arriving in San Marcos, Snider saw Jerry Jeff Walker perform solo at Gruene Hall, a legendary dance hall in New Braunfels, Texas which is northeast of San Antonio. When he saw Walker that night, he decided he wanted to become a songwriter and began writing songs the next day. He told Lone Star Music Magazine in 2004, "I didn't even know how to really play guitar yet, but I saw his show and went and got one."

Snider met Kent Finlay at his very first writer's night, which was at Finlay's San Marcos club, Cheatham Street Warehouse. Finlay, who was a songwriter in his own right, became an important mentor and introduced Snider to the songs of Kris Kristofferson, Guy Clark, John Prine, and Shel Silverstein among others. Snider was soon packing small rooms in San Marcos and during the next few years, he began to draw enthusiastic crowds in Austin, as well.

Snider also discovered Memphis songwriter Keith Sykes while living in San Marcos when a friend at the local record store turned him on to a pair of albums Sykes made in the early ’70s. In 1989, Snider's father moved to Memphis and happened to meet Sykes’ sister-in-law. Through that connection, Snider sent Sykes a demo tape of some of his songs. Sykes thought one of the songs had potential, so Snider moved to Memphis to try to work with Sykes. Not long after he arrived in Memphis, Snider landed a weekly residency at a local club The Daily Planet. He not only was soon packing the room, the audience knew the words to the songs and would sing along. Through Sykes, Snider met Prine in 1991 while assisting on pre-production work Prine was doing with Sykes in Memphis for his album The Missing Years. It was the beginning of a friendship Snider and Prine had until Prine's death in 2020. In 1992, Sykes helped Snider land a development deal with Capitol Records. He recorded a number of sides in Nashville for the label, but they declined to pick up his option for a full album. Around the time of the Capitol deal, Snider began performing with a small band backing him which he dubbed the Bootleggers. The band's lineup fluctuated some over the first year or so, but by the end of 1994, the lineup was set with Will Kimbrough on guitar, Joe Mariencheck on bass, and Joe McLeary on drums. Snider also had changed the band's name to the Nervous Wrecks.

Sykes was a one-time member of Jimmy Buffett’s Coral Reefer Band and Buffett had recorded a few of his songs, so when the Capitol deal fell through, he reached out on Snider's behalf to Buffett's label, Margaritaville Records, which was distributed by MCA. Not long after label exec Bob Mercer saw Snider perform at an industry showcase in Memphis in April 1993, Snider flew to California to open a show for Buffett. After seeing his set, Buffett offered Snider a deal with Margaritaville.

== Recordings ==
=== 1990s ===
==== Margaritaville/MCA years ====
Snider's debut album for Margaritaville, Songs for the Daily Planet, was released in 1994 and reached number 23 on the Billboard Heatseekers Albums chart. Produced by Tony Brown and Mike Utley, the album was literally composed of songs he was playing at the Daily Planet nightclub in Memphis. Although there were a few guest musicians and singers on the record, the core lineup was Snider on acoustic guitar, Joe Mariencheck on bass, Joe McLeary on drums, Utley on keyboards, Eddie Shaver on electric guitar, and Peter Hyrka on mandolin, acoustic guitar, and violin. The record included a hidden track, "Talking Seattle Grunge Rock Blues," which became a minor radio hit, reaching No. 31 on the Billboard Album Rock Tracks chart. A talking blues for Gen-X, the song mocked the early ’90s grunge scene and featured a band that refused to play. The video for another single from the album, "Alright Guy," was in rotation on VH1.

Snider's second album for Margaritaville/MCA, Step Right Up, was released on April 23, 1996, and Billboard proclaimed it to be "more stunning than his debut." Brown and Utley were coproducers with Snider, and Utley backed Snider and the Wrecks on keyboards.

Snider's third album, Viva Satellite, represented a turning point in his career. Prior to making the record, Margaritaville left MCA and signed with Island Records for distribution. But MCA retained rights to Snider's recordings, so they would release the album. No longer recording for Margaritaville or working with Brown and Utley, Snider produced some sides at engineer Justin Niebank's studio in Franklin, Tennessee, with mixed success. Only one of the tracks he cut there would make the album, the finale "Doublewide Blues." Snider recorded the rest of the album at Ardent Studios in Memphis with producer-engineer John Hampton. He was backed by Kimbrough on guitar, Mariencheck on bass, Paul Buchignani on drums, and Rick Steff playing keyboards, and the result was a more straight-ahead rock record than his first two. Shortly before the album was released in May 1998, there was trouble at a private performance in L.A. for MCA execs and their staffs. Snider, who was struggling with drugs at the time, insulted those in attendance early in the set and then left the stage. Not long thereafter, MCA released him from his contract.

=== 2000s ===
==== Oh Boy years ====
After leaving MCA, Snider disbanded the Nervous Wrecks and signed with John Prine’s independent label, Oh Boy Records. Oh Boy released his fourth album, Happy To Be Here, on April 18, 2000. Working with producer Ray Kennedy, Snider recorded all the songs solo acoustic, then additional instrumentation was added to his guitar and vocal tracks. Besides Kennedy who played a variety of instruments on the record, guitarists Pat Buchanan and Will Kimbrough, bassists Joey Spampinato and Keith Christopher, keyboardist Johnny Neel, drummer Paul Buchignani, multi-instrumentalist Peter Holsapple, violinist Tammy Rogers, and horn players Jim Hoke and Wayne Jackson all contributed to the album.

Oh Boy released Snider's second album for the label, New Connection, on May 14, 2002. Produced by R.S. Field, Billboard said of the album, "Snider has settled into a groove of consistent quality and potent observation." Snider's third Oh Boy release was a live album, Near Truths and Hotel Rooms, which was released on May 13, 2003. The record, which was recorded at half a dozen venues, captured Snider's live show post-Nervous Wrecks—just him solo with his acoustic guitar and harmonica. Robert Christgau gave the album an A− grade in his Consumer Guide.

Snider's final studio album for Oh Boy, East Nashville Skyline, was released on July 20, 2004. For the first time, Snider took full creative control of his record-making process, and the result was an album that was both a musical and cultural breakthrough. It introduced East Nashville to the larger world, and its influence reverberates to this day. Snider co-produced the record with his old Nervous Wrecks bandmate Will Kimbrough at engineer Eric McCullough's east Nashville studio. In addition to guitarist Kimbrough and multi-instrumentalist McCullough, he was backed on the sessions by a who's who of east Nashville musicians including guitarist Tim Carroll, bassists Dave Jacques and Dave Roe, drummers Paul Griffith and Craig Wright, and pianist John Deadrick. East Nashville Skyline included two iconic songs that added to the songwriting canon: "Play a Train Song" pushed the boundaries of "train" songs with the story of a man who was known for always requesting that kind of song, and "The Ballad of the Kingsmen" took the talking blues to a more contemporary place musically while connecting the censorship of "Louie Louie" culturally to the Columbine shootings. Pitchfork called the album "the wittiest and feistiest album of his career." Christgau gave it an A in his Consumer Guide and called it "a slacker wakeup call." PopMatters ranked it the seventh-best album of 2004. East Nashville Skyline reached No. 28 on the Billboard Independent Albums chart.

After East Nashville Skyline, Snider moved to Bob Mercer's New Door Records label which was distributed by Universal Music Group, but Oh Boy would issue one more album of his music. On April 3, 2007, the label released Peace, Love And Anarchy (Rarities, B-Sides And Demos, Vol. I), a compilation of previously unreleased recordings. Notable among the collection's fourteen tracks is the song "East Nashville Skyline" which was intended to be the title track of the album of the same name but Snider did not finish it in time to make the album.

==== New Door years ====
While Snider was working on his first record for New Door, UMG released a selection of his Margaritaville and MCA back catalog. The collection, That Was Me: 1994-1998, was released on August 30, 2005, through their reissue arm, Hip-O Records. The compilation included seventeen tracks from all three of the albums distributed by MCA, including "Alright Guy" and "Talking Seattle Grunge Rock Blues," plus a previously unreleased cover of "Margaritaville, a breakneck rendition on which he was backed by the Nervous Wrecks.

Snider's first release for New Door was The Devil You Know, the acclaimed follow-up to East Nashville Skyline released on August 8, 2006. Working again with co-producers Will Kimbrough and Eric McConnell, who both played multiple instruments on the album, Snider also was backed on the record by guitarist Tommy Womack, bassists Billy Mercer, Robert Kearns, and Dave Jacques, drummers Paul Griffith and Craig Wright, pianist Dave Zollo, violinist Molly Thomas, and legendary steel guitarist Lloyd Green. The record went to number four on the Billboard Heatseekers Albums chart. Christgau gave it an A in his Consumer Guide and called it "better" than its predecessor. The record was named to several critics' year-end "best" lists, including a number 33 ranking in Rolling Stone's top 50 albums of the year, a number 25 ranking by No Depression magazine, and number 14 by Blender magazine.

On October 20, 2006, Snider made a solo acoustic in-store appearance at Grimey's New and Preloved Records in Nashville, performing material from The Devil You Know. The performance was recorded and released by New Door on April 3, 2007, as Live With The Devil You Know At Grimey's Nashville 10.20.06. It was his final release on the New Door label.

==== Launch of Aimless Records ====
In 2008, Snider launched his own independent record label, Aimless Records. The label's first release was his eight-song EP Peace Queer, the most political record of his career. The title was inspired by the ’60s avant garde rock band The Fugs who had a line about killing "peace queers." As Snider tells it in the press bio for the album, he was kidnapped by an international league of peace queers who forced him to write the protest songs that appeared on the record. Three of the tracks on the EP were recorded at co-producer Eric McConnell's studio with backing from some of the musicians who worked on Snider's two previous albums, including guitarist Will Kimbrough, bassist Dave Jacques, keyboardist Dave Zollo, and drummers Paul Griffith and Craig Wright. The remainder of the EP was recorded with co-producer Doug Lancio at his studio with Lancio providing musical accompaniment and Patty Griffin contributing backing vocals to two of the tracks—"Cape Henry" and the cover of John Fogerty's "Fortunate Son." Released on October 14, 2008, the record went to number one on the Americana Airplay Chart and number eight on the Billboard Heatseekers Albums chart.

==== Yep Roc album ====
Aimless did not release Snider's next album, The Excitement Plan, because he had already committed it to Yep Roc Records, but it would be the last record he would make for another record label. Produced by Don Was and released on June 9, 2009, the album featured Snider with minimal backing: Was on upright bass, Jim Keltner on drums, and Greg Leisz on dobro and pedal steel. PopMatters called the record "a masterwork of intimacy" and said it "solidified his place among the masters of the form." The Associated Press called it "the finest album of his career." Rolling Stone gave it four stars. Robert Christgau gave it a B+ in his Consumer Guide. The album went to No. 6 on the Billboard Heatseekers Albums chart, and number 31 on the magazine's Independent Albums chart.

=== 2010s ===
==== Aimless label years ====
On February 1, 2011, Aimless released a double-disc live album by Snider, Live: The Storyteller. The album featured performances of songs spanning much of Snider's career along with some of the stories that have become a staple of his live shows. The performances were selected from recordings of concerts in 2010, primarily from shows in Nashville; Asheville, North Carolina; and Ann Arbor, Michigan, but also from his appearance at the 2010 Bonnaroo Music and Arts Festival. On some of the selections, Snider is backed by the jam band Great American Taxi. Christgau gave the album an A− in his Consumer Guide. The Austin Chronicle said the album "does a magnificent job of capturing the onetime San Marcos scenester's genius, a heady combo of post-folk punk and stoned comedian." The album went to number seven on Billboard’s Heatseekers Albums chart and reached No. 36 on the magazine's Independent Albums chart. After working with them on the road in 2010, Snider produced an album on Great American Taxi in 2011, Paradise Lost. The record was released by the band's own label on February 22, 2012.

Also in 2012, Aimless released a pair of albums by Snider. The first, Agnostic Hymns & Stoner Fables, was released on March 6 and included nine original songs plus a cover of Jimmy Buffett's "West Nashville Grand Ballroom Gown." The album's themes of economic inequality were widely noted. The East Nashvillian said Snider was a "one-man Occupy Wall Street" on the record. Rolling Stone called it "Occupy Nashville." Snider recorded the album at Eric McConnell's studio with McConnell co-producing and engineering as well as playing bass. Snider, who played acoustic and electric guitar and harmonica, was also accompanied on the record by violinist/backing vocalist Amanda Shires, Great American Taxi keyboardist Chad Staehly, and drummer Paul Griffith. In addition, Jason Isbell contributed slide guitar and backing vocals to "Digger Dave's Crazy Woman Blues." The record earned an A grade in Robert Christgau’s Consumer Guide. American Songwriter gave it four-and-a-half stars. The album landed on three different Billboard charts. It was number six on the Americana/Folk Albums chart, number 15 on the Independent Albums chart, and number 23 on the Top Rock Albums chart. It also made a number of year-end lists, most notably number five on Christgau's "Top 102 Albums of 2012." It also was ranked number 11 on American Songwriter’s "Top 50 Albums of 2012," number 40 on both The Village Voice’s Pazz and Jop: Top 100 Albums of 2012, Paste’s "50 Best Albums of 2012," and number 47 on Rolling Stone’s "Top 50 Albums of 2012."

On April 24, 2012, Aimless released Snider's tribute album honoring one of his early mentors, Time As We Know It: The Songs of Jerry Jeff Walker. Produced by Don Was, Snider was backed on the album by the members of Great American Taxi (Vince Herman, acoustic guitar, mandolin, backing vocals; Chad Staehly, keyboards; Brian Adams, bass, backing vocals; Jim Lewin, electric guitar, backing vocals; and Chris Sheldon, drums, backing vocals.) In addition, Kix Brooks, Elizabeth Cook, and Amy LaVere were guest vocalists on the album. PopMatters called the album "Snider's love letter to Jerry Jeff Walker." The album went to number 13 on the Billboard Americana/Folk Albums chart.

==== Hard Working Americans ====
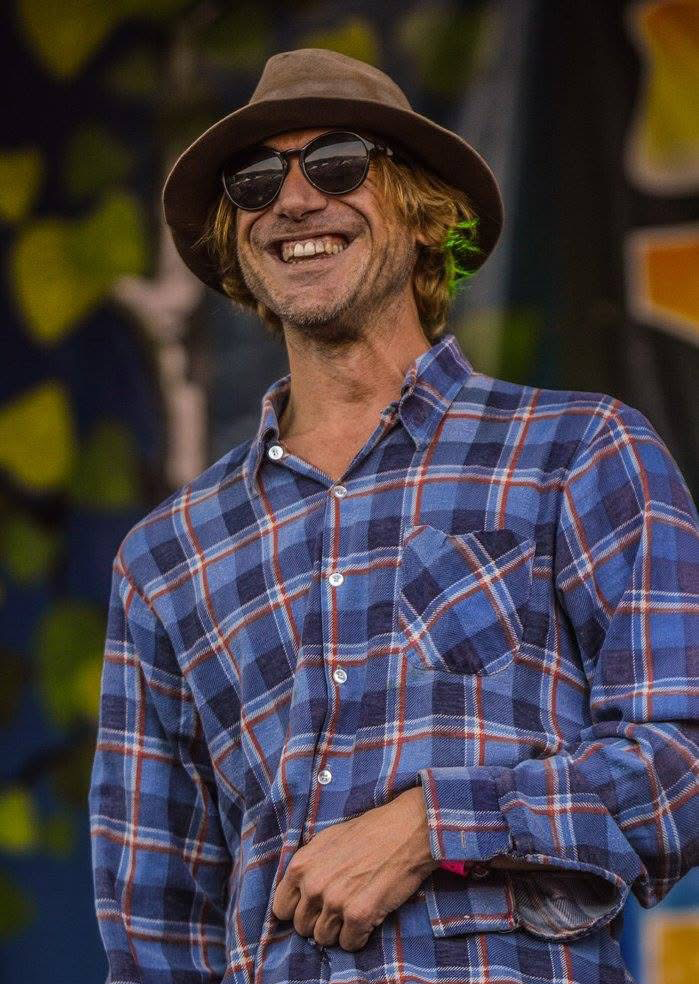
Todd Snider performs with Hard Working Americans at NedFest, Nederland, Colorado 2015

In 2013, Snider cofounded the jam band supergroup Hard Working Americans with Widespread Panic bassist Dave Schools. The band's lineup was Snider on vocals, Schools on bass, Neal Casal on guitar, Chad Staehly on keyboards, and Duane Trucks on drums. After they recorded their first album at Bob Weir’s TRI Studios, they added a sixth member, guitarist and lap steel player Jesse Aycock. The band's debut, Hard Working Americans, was released by Melvin Records on January 21, 2014, and included 11 songs written by songwriters Snider admires, including Randy Newman, Dave Rawlings and Gillian Welch, Kevn Kinney, Hayes Carll, and Will Kimbrough. Later that same year on October 28, Melvin released The First Waltz, a two-disc set that included a CD featuring 11 live recordings by HWA plus a new studio recording with Rosanne Cash, "Come From The Heart," and a full-length documentary film about the band directed by Justin Kreutzmann.

Melvin released Hard Working Americans’ second studio album, Rest in Chaos, on May 13, 2016. The record featured a dozen songs with lyrics by Snider and music by the entire band, plus a cover of Guy Clark’s "The High Price of Inspiration." American Songwriter gave the record four stars out of five.

On August 4, 2017, Melvin Records released a live double album by Hard Working Americans, We’re All In This Together. Robert Christgau rated the album an A− in his Consumer Guide and called it "the rock dream the hippies invented before they burned out." In the spring of 2017, the band went into Cash Cabin Studios and recorded more than an album's worth of material written by Snider, but those recordings have yet to be released.

==== Elmo Buzz and the Eastside Bulldogs ====
In between his work with Hard Working Americans, Snider finished the album Eastside Bulldog which Aimless released on October 6, 2016. While it was released under Snider's name, the material grew out of his side project/alter ego Elmo Buzz and the Eastside Bulldogs who specialize in ’50s and early ’60s rock and roll. Six of the ten songs originally appeared on an EP Shit Sandwich that Aimless released in 2011 as a free download under Elmo Buzz's name. Snider was backed on those sides by Eric McConnell on bass, Jen Gunderman on piano, Mark Horn on drums, and Dennis Taylor on saxophone. In 2016, Snider cut four more sides to complete the album with backing from Aaron Lee Tasjan on guitar, Keith Christopher on bass, Paul Griffith on drums, Robbie Crowell on sax, and Rorey Carroll on percussion, among others. The Irish Times called Eastside Bulldog "26 minutes of perfection that will rip your ears off." The record went to No. 13 on Billboard’s Americana/Folk Albums chart, No. 29 on the Independent Albums chart, and No. 41 on the Top Rock Albums chart.

==== Return to folk roots ====
On March 15, 2019, Aimless Records released Snider's 13th studio album, Cash Cabin Sessions, Vol. 3. Coproduced with Chad Staehly, Snider returned to his folk roots on the solo acoustic album, playing all the instruments on the 10 songs recorded at Cash Cabin Studio in the fall of 2018. Jason Isbell and Amanda Shires added backing vocals to two of the tracks, "The Blues on Banjo" and "A Timeless Response to Current Events." Isbell also added a backing vocal to the single "Like a Force of Nature." Half the songs on the record were among those he recorded with Hard Working Americans at the studio in 2017. Christgau graded the album an A in his Consumer Guide. Rolling Stone gave it four stars. The record was No. 3 on Billboard’s Independent Albums chart, No. 11 on the Americana/Folk Albums chart, No. 21 on the Vinyl Albums chart, and No. 23 on the Album Sales chart.

=== 2020s ===
With the release of First Agnostic Church of Hope and Wonder by Aimless on April 23, 2021, Snider fulfilled his longtime vision of combining funk with folk. He produced the record and played most of the instruments on it, including electric bass, acoustic guitar, electric guitar, banjo and piano. He also sang all the backing vocals. Robbie Crowell handled drums and percussion. Tchad Blake mixed the record, as well as contributed a few sonic and musical touches. No Depression said the record showed Snider "in all his glory." Rolling Stone said it was "a raw portrait of a world-class songwriter processing calamity and chaos in real time." Robert Christgau gave the album a B+ in his Consumer Guide. The album reached number 21 on Billboard’s Americana/Folk Albums chart and number 36 on the Album Sales chart.

In late August of 2026, his website announced an October 9, 2026 release of a posthumous album called My Second Rodeo. Snider had recorded ten songs in September and October, 2025 on acoustic guitar with vocals, with his regular collaborators, Robbie Crowell, Aaron Lee Tasjan, and Joe Bisirri serving as the band. During the recording process, Snider called it "The sound of country music 10 years from now."

=== Tribute recordings ===
In addition to his own recordings, Snider contributed covers to a number of tribute albums during his career beginning in 1996 when he teamed with Joe Ely on a cover of "Oh Boy" for the Buddy Holly tribute album, Not Fade Away (Remembering Buddy Holly).

On August 16, 2004, Snider appeared at a tribute concert at the Paramount Theater in Austin, Texas to honor Billy Joe Shaver on his 65th birthday. Snider's performance of Shaver's "Waco Moon" was included on A Tribute To Billy Joe Shaver - Live, an album documenting the concert which was released on May 17, 2005. In 2006, three tribute albums were released that included sides by Snider. He recorded "Maybe You Heard" for The Pilgrim: A Celebration of Kris Kristofferson released on June 27 of that year. He contributed "They Ain’t Making Jews Like Jesus Anymore" to Why the Hell Not: The Songs of Kinky Friedman released on September 26. And he covered "Traveling Light" for A Case for Case: A Tribute to the Songs of Peter Case released on October 2.

Snider contributed a cover of "A Boy Named Sue" to the 2010 album, Twistable Turnable Man: A Musical Tribute to the Songs of Shel Silverstein. The record also included covers by Kris Kristofferson, John Prine, Bobby Bare, Lucinda Williams, Nanci Griffith, and Black Francis. In 2017, Snider covered "It Sure Was Better Back Then" for the tribute album An American Troubadour: The Songs of Steve Forbert which was released on October 6 of that year.

== Film, television and books ==
In addition to the music videos and promotional videos he's appeared in for his own recordings, Snider made numerous appearances on television and in films.

=== Television ===
Over the years, Snider appeared a number of times on the late night network talk shows. On March 6, 1995, Snider performed "Alright Guy" with the Nervous Wrecks on Late Night with Conan O’Brien. On January 29, 1996, Snider and Joe Ely performed Buddy Holly's "Oh, Boy" on Late Show with David Letterman. He returned to O’Brien's show for a performance of "I Am Too" that aired on May 13, 1998. In 2006 he performed "Looking for a Job" on The Tonight Show With Jay Leno on August 9. A few weeks later, he appeared on the Letterman show again, performing "Unbreakable" on September 1.

Snider also performed on several music programs during his career. In 1995, he appeared on ABC’s In Concert and performed "This Land Is Our Land" and John Fogerty's "Fortunate Son" with backing from the Nervous Wrecks. In 1996, he performed on Austin City Limits with the Wrecks in an episode headlined by John Prine that aired on January 20. Also in 1996, Snider performed "Alright Guy" solo acoustic on VH1’s Crossroads. In 1998, he performed "Rocket Fuel," "My Generation, Part 2," and "I Am Too"on HBO’s Reverb, backed by the Wrecks.

Snider made three appearances in 2010 on Squidbillies during the fifth season of the Adult Swim TV series. He sang the show's theme song in episode seven, "Fatal Distraction," which aired on June 27, 2010. He voiced the character Lobster Freak in episode eight, "Clowny Freaks," which aired on July 4, 2010. He appeared as himself in the season finale, the half-hour, all-star musical special, "America: Why I Love Her," which aired on July 18, 2010, and also included Lucinda Williams, Drive-By Truckers, and Jimmie Dale Gilmore, among others.

=== Film ===
Snider met the filmmaking brothers Brad and Todd Barnes in 2003 when they made a promotional film for his live album Todd Snider Live: Near Truths And Hotel Rooms. During a break in the making of Tension: On the Road With Todd Snider, Snider composed and performed a short instrumental piece for the Barnes brothers’ comedic short, Long Road Home, released that same year. He also composed the music for their 2010 film, The Locksmith. Snider also starred in two "mockumentaries" directed by brothers. The first was 2009's Peace Queer: The Movie. The 42-minute film allegedly offering proof that peace queers had kidnapped Snider and made him write the anti-war protest songs that appeared on his Peace Queer EP. He also starred in the Barnes brothers’ 2013 feature-length, stoner musical mockumentary, East Nashville Tonight, alongside Elizabeth Cook.

In 1997, Snider performed a cover of Steve Goodman’s "This Hotel Room" at a tribute concert in Goodman's honor at the Medinah Temple in Chicago. The concert was filmed, and a decade later, a DVD documenting the concert, Larger Than Life: A Celebration of Steve Goodman and His Music, was released on November 6, 2007. In addition to Snider's performance, the DVD includes performances by John Prine, Arlo Guthrie, Emmylou Harris, Jackson Browne, Lyle Lovett, Iris DeMent, and Goodman himself.

Snider starred along with his Hard Working Americans bandmates in The First Waltz, director Justin Kreutzmann's documentary that captures the formation of Hard Working Americans and their first performances together in late 2013. The film was released by Melvin Records on October 28, 2014, as part of a two-disc set (CD/DVD). In 2020, the film Hard Luck Love Song, which is based on Snider's song, "Just Like Old Times" and includes the song in the film, made a limited release. Then in 2021, the film was picked up by Roadside Attractions for wider distribution with a release date of October 15, 2021.

=== Books ===
On April 22, 2014, Da Capo Press released Snider's quasi-memoir, I Never Met a Story I Didn't Like: Mostly True Tall Tales. Lone Star Music Magazine called it "one of the most charmingly witty memoirs to come down the literary pike in quite some time." Also in 2014, Snider contributed a chapter to a book about his first mentor, Kent Finlay. The book, Kent Finlay, Dreamer: The Musical Legacy behind Cheatham Street Warehouse, was published on February 3, 2016, by Texas A&M University Press.

== Songs covered by other artists ==
Over the course of his career, Snider had written and cowritten a large number of songs which were covered by other artists.

=== 1990s ===
His first cut was by Rick Trevino who recorded Snider's "She Just Left Me Lounge" for his 1994 eponymous release. In 1995, Mark Chesnutt covered "Trouble" for his album Wings. Terry McMillan covered "Somebody's Comin’," a spiritual number which Snider cowrote with Mark Marchetti and Shannon Hills, on his 1997 release Somebody's Comin’ . Then, the song was covered by numerous artists including Russ Taff on his 1999 album, Right Here Right Now.

In 1997, Jack Ingram recorded "Airways Motel," for the album Livin' or Dyin', the first of several songs he would cowrite with Snider. Two years later, Ingram recorded a pair of songs they cowrote, "Feel Like I'm Falling In Love" and "Barbie Doll," for 1999's Hey You. Snider and Jason Ringenberg cowrote "This Town Isn't Keeping You Down," which appeared on Jason & The Scorchers' 1998 release, Midnight Roads & Stages Seen.

=== 2000s ===
Snider and BR-549's Gary Bennett cowrote "Better Than This," which appeared on BR-549's 2000 live album, Coast to Coast Live. Both Gary Allan and Jerry Jeff Walker covered Snider's "Alright Guy" in 2001. Allan's recording of the song appeared on his album of the same name, while Walker's version appeared on his album Gonzo Stew.

Snider collaborated with Jason Ringenberg again on "James Dean's Car," which appeared on Ringenberg's 2002 solo album, All Over Creation. Billy Joe Shaver recorded two songs he and Snider cowrote: "Deja Blues," which was included on his 2002 album, Freedom's Child, and "The Real Deal," which appeared on his 2005 record of the same name. Cross Canadian Ragweed has covered two of Snider's songs: "Late Last Night" on their 2005 album Garage and "I Believe You" on 2007's Mission California.

Keith Sykes, one of Snider's early mentors, recorded a song they cowrote "Tearing the House Down," and released it on his 2006 album, Let It Roll. Snider's former Nervous Wrecks bandmate Will Kimbrough has recorded several songs he and Snider cowrote. Two of their collaborations, "I Want Out" and "Cape Henry," were included on Kimbrough's 2006 compilation, Godsend (Unreleased Songs, 1994-2002). He recorded two others, "Horseshoe Lake" and "Half a Man," for his 2007 EP Will Kimbrough.

Jack Ingram recorded ”Easy as 1, 2, 3 (Part II)," another of his collaborations with Snider, for his 2007 album. This Is It, T. Graham Brown covered Somebody's Comin’ for his 2008 release, From A Stronger Place.

=== 2010s ===
Snider cowrote half an album of songs with Jason D. Williams, a vocalist and pianist from Memphis for Williams’ 2010 album Killer Instincts, which Snider produced. Some of those songs had additional cowriters including Dan Baird and Bobby Bare Jr. Will Kimbrough included another of his cowrites with Snider, "It Ain’t Cool," on his 2010 release Wings. Willie Braun's band Reckless Kelly recorded a song he cowrote with Snider, "I Never Liked St. Valentine," which appeared on his 2011 album Good Luck & True Love.

Texas music legends, Robert Earl Keen and Pat Green have recorded Snider's songs. Keen covered "Play a Train Song" on his 2011 album Ready For Confetti. Green covered "I Am Too," which was written by Snider and Kimbrough, on his 2012 release Songs We Wish We'd Written II. Somebody's Comin’ has been a favorite among Christian artists, and gospel legends Bill and Gloria Gaither covered the song on their 2011 record, Alaskan Homecoming. Dash Rip Rock covered the Snider-Shaver cowrite "The Real Deal (as "Real Deal") on 2013's Dash Does Shaver. Country legend Loretta Lynn recorded a song she cowrote with Snider, "Everything It Takes," for her 2016 album Full Circle.

In the same year, a song Snider cowrote with singer-songwriter Elizabeth Cook and Dexter Green, "Cutting Diamonds," was released on Cook's Exodus of Venus album. Jack Ingram released a pair of songs he wrote with Snider, "Alright Alright Alright" and "Everybody Wants To Be Somebody" (also cowritten with Jon Randall Stewart), on 2019's Ridin’ High...Again.

=== 2020s ===
In 2021, Tom Jones released an eclectic cover of Snider's "Talking Reality Television Blues" on his 2021 album Surrounded By Time. In 2022, Corb Lund, a Canadian singer from southern Alberta, released a cover of Snider's "Age Like Wine" on his 2022 album "Songs My Friends Wrote".

== Personal life and death ==
Snider and painter Melita Osheowitz, whom he met in rehab in 1997, were married. In early 2015, he said in an interview that he had "just got divorced". His touring was limited by health conditions including spinal stenosis.

On November 3, 2025, a post on Snider's Instagram announced the cancellation of remaining tour dates after he had sustained "severe injuries as the victim of a violent assault outside of his hotel." He was in Salt Lake City preparing to play the second stop on his "High Lonesome and Then Some" tour. Snider told police he was beaten up and robbed at the Commonwealth Room, the venue where he had been scheduled to play later that night. A news report said his injuries required him to have staples in his head. Salt Lake City police later charged Snider with disorderly conduct, criminal trespass, and threats of violence for reportedly causing a disturbance while seeking treatment from Holy Cross Hospital.

While failing to recover at his home in Nashville from the incident, Snider took himself to a hospital where he was put in a medically induced coma and died from pneumonia and sepsis on November 14, 2025, at the age of 59.

== Honors and awards ==
After the success of The Devil You Know in 2006, Snider was nominated for Artist of the Year at the sixth annual Americana Honors & Awards in 2007. The nominees in the category included Lucinda Williams, Patty Griffin, and Joe Ely. Hard Working Americans was nominated for an award in the Best Duo/Group category at the Americana Honors & Awards in 2014. On October 9, 2021, Snider was inducted into the Oregon Music Hall of Fame during a ceremony at the Aladdin Theater in Portland, Oregon.

== Discography ==
=== Albums ===
Year	Album	Peak chart positions				
Year	Album	US	US Heat	US Indie	US Rock	US Folk
1994	Songs for the Daily Planet	—	23	—	—	—
1996	Step Right Up	—	—	—	—	—
1998	Viva Satellite	—	—	—	—	—
2000	Happy to Be Here	—	—	—	—	—
2002	New Connection	—	—	45	—	—
2003	Near Truths and Hotel Rooms	—	—	—	—	—
2004	East Nashville Skyline	—	44	28	—	—
2005	That Was Me: The Best of Todd Snider 1994–1998	—	—	—	—	—
2006	The Devil You Know	173	4	—	—	—
2007	Peace Love and Anarchy (Rarities, B-Sides, & Demos, Vol. 1)	—	—	—	—	—
2007	Live with the Devil You Know (Grimey's – Nashville)	—	—	—	—	—
2008	Peace Queer	—	8	44	—	—
2009	The Excitement Plan	144	6	31	—	—
2011	Todd Snider Live: The Storyteller	—	7	36	—	—
2012	Time as We Know It: The Songs of Jerry Jeff Walker	—	—	—	—	13
2012	Agnostic Hymns & Stoner Fables	95	—	15	23	6
2016	Eastside Bulldog	—	—	29	41	13
2019	Cash Cabin Sessions, Vol 3	—	—	3	11	—
2021	First Agnostic Church Of Hope and Wonder	—	—	—	—	21
2012	Live: Return of the Storyteller	—	—	—	—	—
2023	Crank It, We're Doomed	—	—	—	—	—
2025	High, Lonesome and Then Some	—	—	—	—	—
2026	My Second Rodeo	—	—	—	—	—
"—" denotes releases that did not chart

=== DVDs ===
- The Devil You Know (2007)

=== Singles ===
Year	Single	Chart Positions		Album
Year	Single	US MSR	CAN AC	Album
1994	"Talkin' Seattle Grunge Rock Blues"	31	—	Songs for the Daily Planet
1994	"This Land Is Our Land"	—	—	Songs for the Daily Planet
1995	"Alright Guy"	—	33	Songs for the Daily Planet
1996	"I Believe You"	—	—	Step Right Up
1996	"Late Last Night"	—	—	Step Right Up

=== Music videos ===
Year	Video	Director
1995	"Alright Guy"	Jim Shea
1996	"I Believe You"	
2006	"Looking For A Job"	
2006	"You Got Away With It (A Tale Of Two Fraternity Brothers)"	
2016	"Ways and Means"	
2019	"Talking Reality Television Blues"	
2022	"Just Like Old Times"	
2025	"High, Lonesome and Then Some"	

== Publications ==
Year	Title	Publisher
2014	I Never Met a Story I Didn't Like	Da Capo Press
2025	East Nashville Skyline: The Songwriting Legacy of Todd Snider	Texas A&M University Press
