= Salton Sea (2018 film) =

2018 film by Michael Stevantoni

- Directed by: Michael Stevantoni
- Written by: Michael Stevantoni and Tim Rousseau
- Based on: Salton Sea by George McCormick
- Produced by: J.J. Englert; Gia Rigoli; Michael Stevantoni
- Starring: Joel Bissonnette; Keylor Leigh; Olivia May
- Cinematography: Thomas Taugher
- Edited by: Mac Nelsen
- Music by: Daniel McClure
- Production company: Colab Studios
- Release dates: November 11, 2018 (Blowup Arthouse Film Festival); July 1, 2019 (streaming and Blu-ray)
- Running time: 80 minutes
- Country: United States
- Language: English

Salton Sea (also known as Desert Shores) is a 2018 American independent film directed by Michael Stevantoni and based on George McCormick's 2012 short story collection Salton Sea. The film was shot at the Salton Sea, and the town Desert Shores, California.

The film was released on streaming and Blu-ray by Cinema Epoch on July 1, 2019.

== Synopsis ==
Hoping to convince his wife that a promotion across the country could change their lives, Brian takes her on a trip to a faded resort town where they once honeymooned. Here, Brian is forced to examine his own marriage, fears, and integrity.

== Cast ==
- Joel Bissonnette as Brian
- Keylor Leigh as Ramona
- Olivia May as Annie

== Reception ==
The film premiered at the Blow-Up Chicago International Arthouse Film Festival where it won the Stanley Kubrick Award for Best Feature (USA) and Best Actor for Joel Bissonnette. The film also won Best Feature at the Nacogdoches Film Festival and the ABQ Indie Fest, while also receiving nominations at the Milan International Film Festival for Best Movie, Best Actor (Bissonnette) and Best Supporting Actress (Leigh).
