= Guy Forsyth =

American singer and songwriter (born 1968)

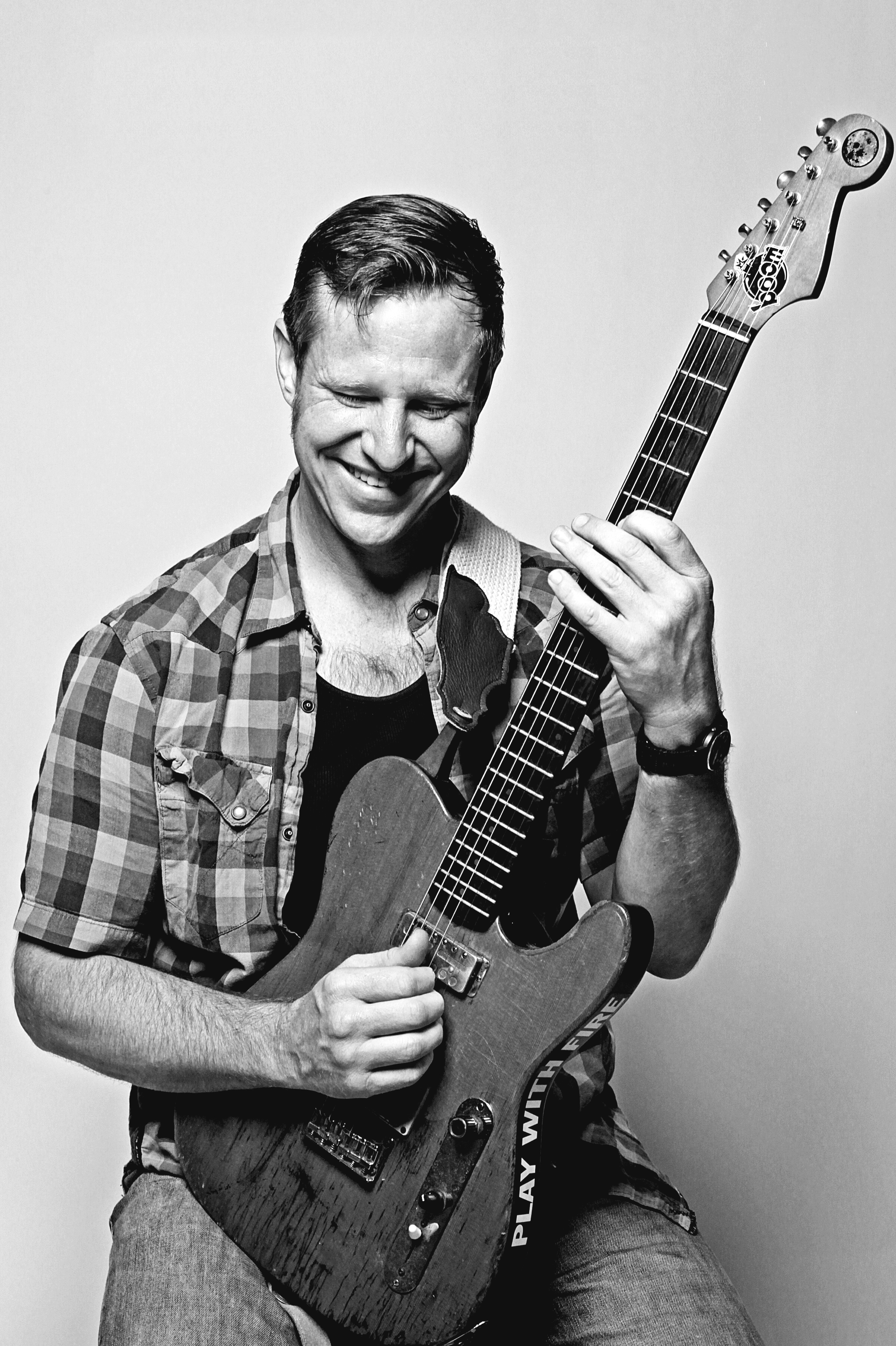
- Forsyth in 2013

Background information
- Born: November 30, 1968 (age 57); Denver, Colorado, United States
- Genres: Texas blues, Americana, blues rock
- Occupations: Singer, musician
- Instruments: Guitar, harmonica, musical saw
- Years active: 1990s–present
- Label: 33rd Street
- Website: Official website

Guy Forsyth (born November 30, 1968) is an American blues rock singer and songwriter.

He has toured in the U.S. and Europe and has been the opening act for Ray Charles, Robert Cray, Dr. John, B.B. King, Jimmie Vaughan, and Lucinda Williams.

Forsyth's repertoire primarily incorporates elements of blues and Americana traditions, with the requisite traces of rock, R&B, folk, jazz and pop. As a songwriter, many of his albums contain his own work and songs he co-composed with other musicians. Forsyth has won several Austin Music Awards, including one for "best male vocalist" in 2005.

== Life and career ==
Forsyth was born in Denver, Colorado, and grew up in Kansas City, Missouri. With an airline employee as a father, Forsyth's formative years were interspersed with frequent moves to New York, Connecticut, and California before the family returned to Kansas City. By the age of 16 he began playing harmonica, in addition to singing, and was influenced by the work of Robert Johnson to learn guitar. Forsyth moved to Austin, Texas, in January 1990.

By the mid-1990s, Forsyth's live performances became well known around Austin. In addition to solo work and with his own band, Forsyth was one of the co-founders of the Asylum Street Spankers. The band developed a raucous and irreverent sound that was driven by musicianship and theatricality. The band played most of its early concerts without amplification. Forsyth played on the 2000 album, Spanker Madness. A Dutch based independent record label had earlier released High Temperature (1994), a live recording of Forsyth's own band's work. The following year, Needle Gun was released by Lone Star Music, with the work also billed as by the Guy Forsyth Band. AllMusic noted that his live work was "loud, raw and raucous." Forsyth played a lengthy residency at Antone's during this time and, in preparing work for his third album, he left the Asylum Street Spankers to pursue his solo career.

In 1999, Can You Live Without was released, and in the following year Steak. Forsyth tried to promote both efforts but his record label hit financial trouble and momentum was lost. In 2002, he set up his own label, Small and Nimble Records.

In 2005 Love Songs: For and Against was issued. Forsyth increased his touring schedule and performed at the Austin City Limits Music Festival in 2005 and 2007, plus the High Sierra Music Festival (2007), Notodden Blues Festival (1994), Los Alamos Festival, BBQ & Blues Festival, Tønder Festival (2008), Rhythm 'n' Blues Festival, American Music Festival, Ottawa Bluesfest, Kerrville Folk Festival and Rochester's Bricktown Festival. 2007′s Unrepentant Schizophrenic Americana, was a double live compilation album. Calico Girl (2008), featured new songs as well as re-recordings from Can You Live Without. 300 Miles from Here to There, a live performance CD and DVD was issued in 2011.

In 2012, The Freedom to Fail was released by Blue Corn Music. "These songs represent an articulation of the changes in my viewpoints and the new legality that I see." Forsyth explained. "Becoming a father in this period of time and looking around me and trying to figure out what it is that I had to say to my daughter to explain myself. I don't feel the need to explain myself to everyone, but I sure as hell feel the need to explain myself to my daughter, because I want her to have that sort of connection with her origins." It was recorded at the Lost Oasis Studio in Austin, Texas, and included musical contributions from Jon Dee Graham, plus Asylum Street Spankers band mates Jonathan Doyle and Sick.

Forsyth continued to tour and perform regularly in 2015.

Forsyth contributed "Thanks Me" to the satirical album Floater: A Tribute to the Tributes to Gary Floater, released early in 2018 on the Austin-based Eight 30 Records.

== Discography ==
=== Albums ===
Year	Title	Record label(s)	Notes
1994	High Temperature	Lizard Discs (Netherlands)	Billed as The Guy Forsyth Band (live)
1995	Needle Gun	Antone's/Lone Star	Billed as The Guy Forsyth Band
1999	Can You Live Without	Antone's/Lone Star	
2000	Steak	Antone's/Lone Star	
2002	Voices Inside	Small and Nimble	
2005	Love Songs : For and Against	33rd Street/Small and Nimble	Produced by Mark Addison
2007	Unrepentant Schizophrenic Americana	Semaphore/Small and Nimble	compilation Produced by Mark Addison
2008	Calico Girl	Semaphore/Small and Nimble	Produced by Mark Addison
2010	Live at Gruene Hall	Semaphore/Small and Nimble	live
2012	The Freedom to Fail	Blue Corn	
2014	Moustache Girl	Small and Nimble	Side project : The Hot Nut Riveters (debut album)
2015	Red Dress	Lizard Disc/Small and Nimble	
2015	The Pleaser	Small and Nimble	
2019	Conspirators	Small and Nimble	with Jeska Bailey

== See also ==
- List of Texas blues musicians
- List of blues rock musicians
- List of Austin City Limits performers
