= Kent Finlay =

American singer songwriter (1938–2015)

- Born: February 9, 1938; Fife, Texas
- Died: March 2, 2015 (aged 77); Martindale, Texas
- Occupations: Entrepreneur, singer, songwriter, teacher
- Spouse: Diana Finlay Hendricks (m. 1979 d.2002)
- Children: Jenni Finlay, Sterling Finlay, HalleyAnna Finlay

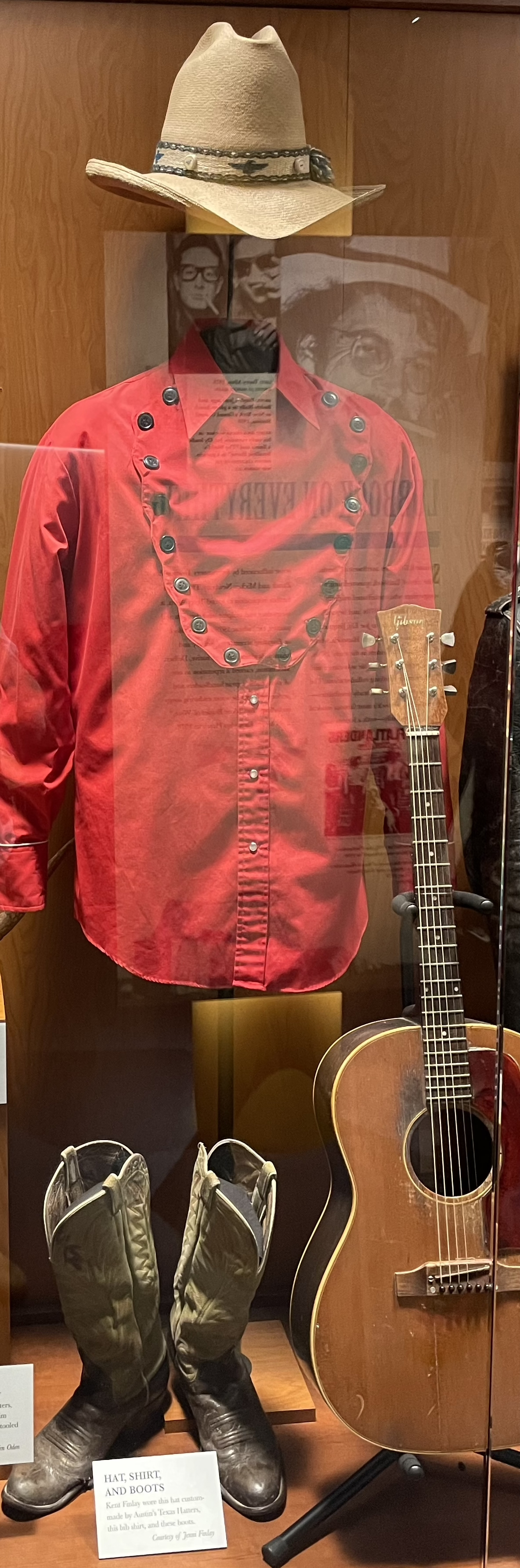
Kent Finlay exhibit at the Country Music Hall of Fame, Outlaws & Armadillos: Country's Roaring ‘70s in Nashville, Tennessee (showing from 2018 to 2021)

James Kent Finlay (February 9, 1938 – March 2, 2015) was an American singer and songwriter. The founder of the Cheatham Street Warehouse in San Marcos, Texas, he supported, promoted, and mentored Texas musicians including George Strait, Todd Snider, Stevie Ray Vaughan, and The Randy Rogers Band early in their careers.

Inspired by time spent in Luckenbach, Texas with friend and mentor Hondo Crouch, in June 1974 Finlay opened his own honky-tonk music venue along the train tracks in San Marcos, Texas with business partner Jim Cunningham. Formerly a grocery warehouse, the music hall known as The Cheatham Street Warehouse would serve as an important outlet for many up-and-coming musicians to perform. A former teacher and a lifelong, passionate musician and music-lover, Finlay has been recognized for his mentorship and encouragement of generations of singers and songwriters who passed through his venue and participated in his weekly "Songwriter's Circle".

Kent Finlay was the recipient of the 2007 Coach Darrell K. Royal Texas Heritage Songwriters' Patron Award from the Texas Heritage Songwriters Association, the Lone Star Award from Lone Star Music in 2014, the 2014 San Marcos Tourism Lifetime Achievement Award, and posthumous induction into the Texas Music Legends Hall of Fame in 2016. Finlay established the non-profit Cheatham Street Music Foundation in 2005 to serve in the development, promotion and preservation of Texas music through regular songwriting classes, workshops, concerts and public forums in the spirit of Finlay's original songwriter's circles.
