= Cheatham Street Warehouse =

Music venue in San Marcos, Texas

Coordinates: 29.8767°N 97.9398°W

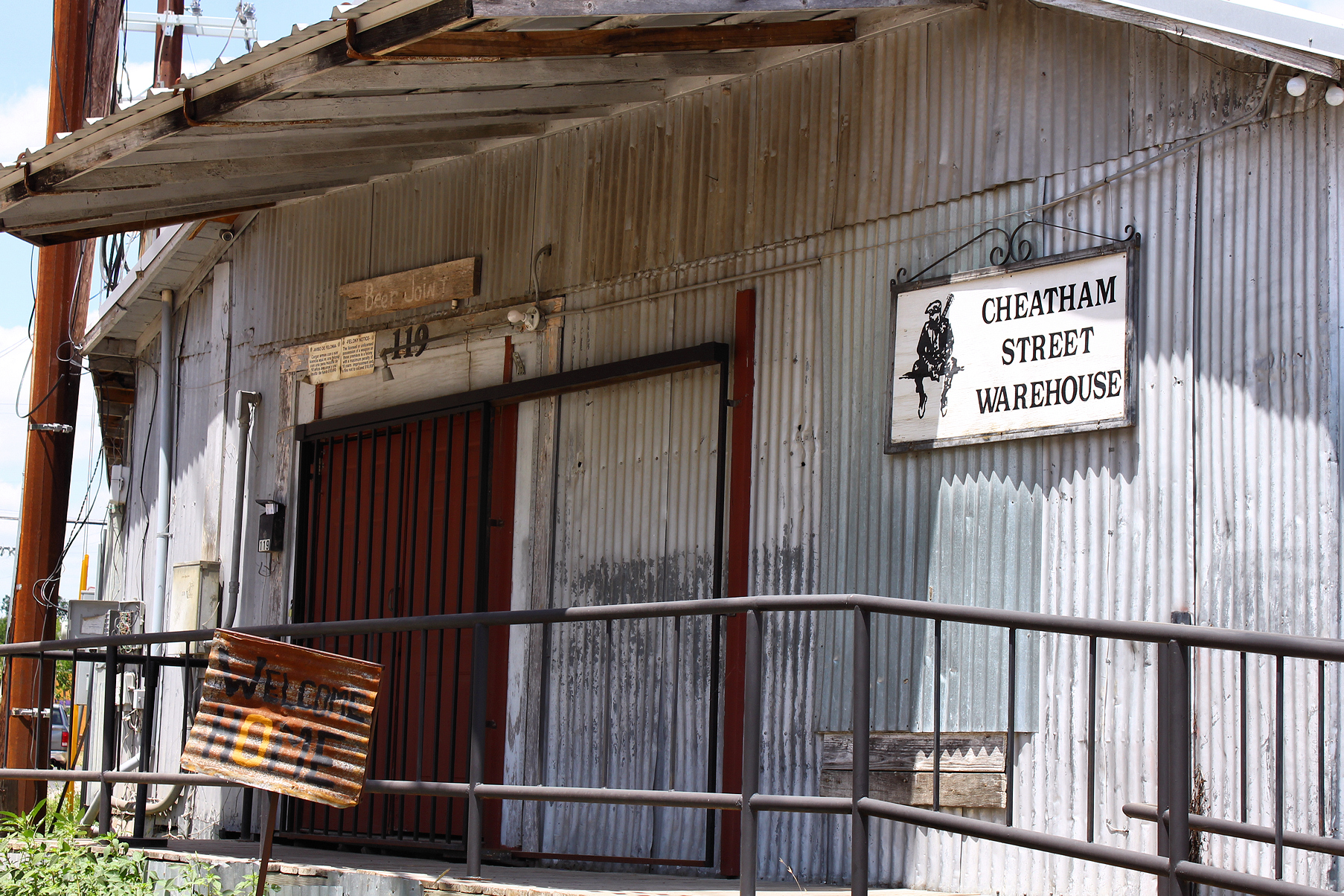
Cheatham Street Warehouse East Entrance

Cheatham Street Warehouse is a music venue located in San Marcos, Texas. It was built in 1910 as a grocery warehouse along the railroad tracks for a local grocery.

In 1974, Texas State University alumnus (1961, 1965) Kent Finlay and business partner San Marcos Daily Record writer Jim Cunningham leased the building to open a honky-tonk music hall, greatly influenced by Luckenbach, Texas' Hondo Crouch. In 1979, Cunningham grew tired of selling all the beer he could not drink, and moved on to continue his journalism career. Kent and his wife, Diana Becker Finlay (Hendricks), continued owning the business, attempting to owner-finance the sale of the business several times, only to have it return to them; which led Kerrville Folk Festival's Rod Kennedy to describe the venue as "Kent's Bastard Child."

The venue provided an outlet for a variety of local musicians at the beginning of their careers. Southwest Texas State University student George Strait and the Ace in the Hole Band played their first shows in the venue in 1975. In the early 1980s, a young Stevie Ray Vaughan played there every Tuesday night.

Cheatham Street Warehouse has hosted such acts as Willie Nelson, Ernest Tubb, Delbert McClinton, Townes Van Zandt, Marcia Ball, Jerry Jeff Walker, Ray Wylie Hubbard, Charlie Sexton, Gary P. Nunn, Asleep at the Wheel as well as many, many up-and-coming Texas artists such as James McMurtry, Slaid Cleaves, Shelley King, Hayes Carll, Sunny Sweeney, Randy Rogers Band, HalleyAnna, and Todd Snider.

Kent Finlay died on Texas Independence Day, 2015 and Randy Rogers Band lead singer Randy Rogers, whose debut album was recorded at Cheatham Street in 2000, purchased the venue from Kent's children, Jenni, Sterling and HalleyAnna Finlay in 2017.
