= Daniel Layus =

American musician (born 1984)

Dan Layus
- Born: Daniel Robin Layus; September 10, 1984 (age 42); California, United States
- Origin: San Diego, California, U.S.
- Genres: Americana, rock, indie rock, pop rock, roots rock
- Occupations: Singer, musician, songwriter
- Instruments: Vocals, piano, guitar
- Years active: 2002–present
- Labels: Plated Records, Epic, Razor & Tie, Washington Square
- Website: danlayusmusic.com

Daniel Robin Layus (born September 10, 1984) is an American musician. He is the lead vocalist, guitarist, pianist and primary lyricist for the band Augustana. On October 21, 2016, he debuted his first solo work, an album titled Dangerous Things.

== Early life ==
Layus was born in Southern California. In 2002 at Greenville College in Illinois, Dan Layus brought friends Josiah Rosen, Kyle Baker, and Simeon Lohrmann together to write and create music.

== Career ==
=== Augustana (2002–2016) ===
Augustana began by re-recording the song "More than a Love Song", a song which Dan had written for his high school girlfriend while living in California. In 2003, when Layus was 19, Augustana released their debut album, Midwest Skies and Sleepless Mondays. Later that year, the band recorded and released 25 copies of the Mayfield EP.

Dan Layus decided to move back to Southern California with bandmate Josiah Rosen, where they eventually found their drummer, Justin South. The band joined numerous tours with artists such as Switchfoot, Maroon 5, The Fray, Counting Crows, Dashboard Confessional, O.A.R., Snow Patrol, The Damnwells, Goo Goo Dolls, Acceptance, Cartel, and OneRepublic, as well as having their own headlining tours.

The band released their first album, All the Stars and Boulevards, on September 6, 2005 Josiah Rosen left the band soon after. He was replaced by Chris Sachtleben, while keyboardist Dan Lamoureux was added (and later replaced by John Vincent).

At the beginning of 2007, the band embarked on their second headlining tour, supported by Vega4. The band also opened for Chris Carrabba of Dashboard Confessional in late 2007.

The band released their second album, Can't Love, Can't Hurt, on April 29, 2008. Citing personnel problems, the band had to cancel their European/North American tour for fall 2010.

Augustana's self-titled, third full-length album was released on April 26, 2011.

Augustana parted ways with Epic Records shortly after the album's release and on November 11, 2011, Dan Layus announced that all remaining members had amicably parted ways when bassist, Jared Palomar, guitarist, Chris Sachtleben, drummer, Justin South, and keyboardist, John Vincent, decided that they were finished with Augustana. Layus announced that he would continue to tour and perform under the name Augustana. On July 22, 2013, Layus announced that Augustana was signed to a new record deal.

In early 2014, Layus announced that the band had signed with Razor & Tie, reforming the band with new members and touring as Augustana. He also premiered the first single, "Ash and Ember". On April 22, 2014, under the name 'Augustana', Layus released the album, Life Imitating Life, on which he played all of the instruments. He also premiered the first single, "Ash and Ember".

In summer of 2015, Layus opened for One Direction. On September 2, 2015, Augustana released three new tracks ("Climb", "Must Be Love" and "You Can Have Mine") on an EP titled "Side A".

In 2016, Augustana began touring as an opener for the Dixie Chicks on their DCX MMXVI World Tour.

On August 3, 2016, Augustana's social media sites changed their names to Dan Layus, as he was the sole remaining and founding member, as well as lead singer-songwriter.

=== Solo work (2016–2019) ===
After Augustana broke up, Layus transitioned into an Americana artist and fully embarked on a solo career. Layus and his family relocated from Los Angeles to Nashville in 2013. Layus began composing professionally three days a week, nine to five, for Nashville publishing house, Warner-Chappell Music, where he befriended, then began writing with, young Music Row talents like Maren Morris.

Layus released the album, Dangerous Things, on October 21, 2016. "Dangerous Things", which was released with Plated Records, was met with enthusiastic reviews. Rolling Stone magazine called Layus "one of Americana's most articulate newcomers." The album was recorded at South by Sea Studios in Nashville. Layus used a minimalist production style of fiddle, pedal steel, acoustic guitar, and piano. The sibling duo, the Secret Sisters, provided background vocals on a number of tracks.

Layus drew inspiration for the song "Driveway" from the real life experience of a friend when he observed his buddy sitting alone in his truck in the driveway as he was going through a divorce. When he was writing the song and was unable to finish the idea he played it for his wife. Though not a songwriter, she threw in some words and helped Layus to finish the track.

Layus has played the Grand Ole Opry twice both at the Ryman Auditorium in downtown Nashville and the Grand Ole Opry House. His Opry debut was at Opryland. He shared the bill with the veteran country singer, Connie Smith. He performed at the Ryman during a special Opry New Year's Eve show with the Americana band, Old Crow Medicine Show.

In 2017, Layus toured with LeAnn Rimes during her "Remnants" Tour.

In 2018, Layus began touring again under the name Augustana.

In 2019, Layus co-wrote the third track on the album The Highwomen, which is the debut studio album by country music supergroup the Highwomen. The group is made up of band members Brandi Carlile, Natalie Hemby, Maren Morris, and Amanda Shires. The album and track were released on September 6, 2019, by Elektra Records. Layus co-wrote the song with band member, Maren Morris, and songwriter, Maggie Chapman.

=== Augustana (2019–present) ===
On August 28, 2019, as Augustana, Layus released the song "For Now, Forever" was released as a single with "The Heart of It" as its B-side. He has stated that the songs were inspired by watching classic '80s movies for the first time, such as, The Karate Kid, Dirty Dancing, and Footloose.

Layus began a headlining Fall 2019 Tour as Augustana on August 24 with musician, Zac Clark, opening. He also opened for band, Daughtry, at eight shows.

In 2025, guitarist, Chris Sachtleben and bassist, Jared Palomar would rejoin the band and they will be performing with Augustana this summer of 2025 just after 14 years of absence from the band.

== Personal life ==
Layus married his longtime girlfriend, Nina, on January 18, 2008. They met and began dating prior to the release of his first record with Augustana when they moved in together. They have four children, Eloise, Townes, Mary, and Prudence Jane, who was born December 15, 2017. They reside in Franklin, Tennessee.

Layus has been sober since 2011.

== Discography ==
=== Studio albums ===
Year	Album details
2016	Dangerous Things: Released: October 21, 2016; Label: Plated Records; Format: CD, LP

=== Singles ===
List of singles, with selected chart positions and certifications, showing year released and album name
Title	Year	Peak positions					Album
Title	Year	US	US AAA	US Adult	US Alt.	US Rock	Album
"Driveway"	2016	—	—	—	—	—	Dangerous Things
"—" denotes a recording that did not chart.

=== Credits ===
Songwriting, producing, and performance credits
Artist	Year	Credit
Augustana	2003	Member of Attributed Artist, Vocals, Guitar, Piano, and Composer on album Mayfield EP
Augustana	2003	Member of Attributed Artist, Vocals, Guitar, Piano, and Composer on album Midwest Skies and Sleepless Mondays
Augustana	2005	Member of Attributed Artist, Vocals, Guitar, Piano and Composer on album All the Stars and Boulevards
Kidz Bop	2007	Composer on Kidz Bop 12: "Boston"
Augustana	2008	Member of Attributed Artist, Vocals, Guitar, Piano, and Composer on album Can't Love, Can't Hurt
Augustana	2008	Member of Attributed Artist, Vocals, Guitar, Piano, and Composer on album Can't Love, Can't Hurt EP
Greyson Chance	2010	Composer on "Fire"
Augustana	2011	Guitar, Vocals, and Composer on album Augustana
Augustana	2014	Member of Attributed Artist, Vocals, Guitar, Piano, and Composer on album Life Imitating Life
Brantley Gilbert	2015	Co-writer on Just as I Am: "Stone Cold Sober"
The Summer Set	2016	Co-writer on Stories for Monday: "All Downhill from Here"
Dan Layus	2016	Primary Artist, producer, Liner Notes, Guitar, Piano, Vocals, and Composer on album Dangerous Things
The Highwomen	2019	Co-writer on The Highwomen: "Loose Change"

=== As lead artist ===
List of singles as lead artist, with selected chart positions, showing year released and album name
Title	Year	Peak chart positions						Album
Title	Year	US	US AAA	US Pop	US Adult	US Main.	CAN	Album
"Stars and Boulevards"	2005	—	16	—	—	—	—	All the Stars and Boulevards
"Boston"	2005	34	9	31	10	24	82	All the Stars and Boulevards
"Sweet and Low"	2008	88	4	66	33	—	—	Can't Love, Can't Hurt
"Hey Now"	2008	—	—	—	—	—	—	Can't Love, Can't Hurt
"I Still Ain't Over You"	2008	—	20	—	—	—	—	Can't Love, Can't Hurt
"Steal Your Heart"	2011	—	18	—	—	—	—	Augustana
"Just Stay Here Tonight"	2011	—	—	—	—	—	—	Augustana
"Ash and Ember"	2014	—	27	—	—	—	—	Life Imitating Life
"—" denotes a release that did not chart.
