= The Highwomen (album) =

Studio album by the Highwomen
- Released: September 6, 2019
- Recorded: March 2019
- Studios: RCA Studio A (Nashville); Southern Ground (Nashville); Blackbird (Nashville)
- Genre: Country
- Length: 42:59
- Label: Elektra
- Producer: Dave Cobb

Singles from The Highwomen
- 1. "Redesigning Women" Released: July 19, 2019; 2. "Crowded Table" Released: July 26, 2019; 3. "Highwomen" Released: August 13, 2019

The Highwomen is the debut studio album by country music supergroup the Highwomen, made up of band members Brandi Carlile, Natalie Hemby, Maren Morris, and Amanda Shires. It was released on September 6, 2019, by Elektra Records.

== Background ==
In 2016, when Shires was finishing her record My Piece of Land in music producer Dave Cobb's studio, Shires had an idea to create a female country supergroup in homage to the legendary Highwaymen (consisting of Johnny Cash, Waylon Jennings, Kris Kristofferson and Willie Nelson). At the same time, the lack of representation of female artists on country radio and at country music festivals had been publicly discussed by many journalists like Marissa Moss. While on tour in her van, Shires kept a running list of artists while listening to country radio, and noticed that there were very few women. When she called to request they play more female artists, she was directed to a Facebook page lottery system. Cobb recommended Shires call Carlile, whom she did not know. Carlile thought it would be fun, and would be an interesting creative project.

The Highwomen project was widely hinted at by Carlile, Morris and Shires before it was officially announced on April 6, 2019. The Highwomen had originally intended to leave the fourth spot in their line-up vacant to allow other female collaborators to join them, with Chely Wright, Courtney Marie Andrews, Margo Price, Janelle Monáe, and Sheryl Crow mentioned as potential guests. The band, who jokingly refer to the collaboration as a pirate-ship experience, said that they see the project as an incubator project that highlights mentorship and support of fellow women artists.

The group made their live debut on April 1, 2019, at Loretta Lynn's 87th birthday concert, held at the Bridgestone Arena in Nashville. There, Natalie Hemby was officially revealed as the final member and the quartet performed "It Wasn't God Who Made Honky Tonk Angels".

== Release and promotion ==
The album was officially announced on July 19, 2019, with the release of the album's first single, "Redesigning Women", along with the album's pre-order. The music video for "Redesigning Women" was released the same day. The promotional single "Crowded Table" was released on July 26. On July 30, the Highwomen appeared on The Tonight Show with Jimmy Fallon, where they performed "Redesigning Women" and "Crowded Table". In July 2019, the Highwomen performed their first ever full live set at the 60th annual Newport Folk Festival, previewing songs from their upcoming album. The third and final promotional single, "Highwomen", was released on August 13.

== Content ==
The album opens with "Highwomen", a re-written version of the Jimmy Webb–penned classic "Highwayman". The song was re-written by Carlile and Shires — with Webb's blessing and assistance — as a response song reflecting how women throughout history often sacrifice themselves for a greater good, illustrating this with a Honduran immigrant who dies getting her children over the border (sung by Carlile), a healer executed for witchcraft (Shires), a freedom rider (guest vocals from Yola), and a preacher (Hemby); Sheryl Crow also provided backing vocals.

The album's second track, and lead single, is "Redesigning Women". It was written by band member Natalie Hemby with Rodney Clawson. Rolling Stone said that the song "puts a woman’s experience front and center, with just enough punch to make it smart, self-deprecating, and sarcastic all at once." The third track, "Loose Change", written by band member Maren Morris with Maggie Chapman and Daniel Layus of the band Augustana, is filled with clever wordplay and a heavy dose of Texas swagger. "Crowded Table", the fourth track and second single, was written by band members Hemby and Carlile with Lori McKenna. Rolling Stone called the song the band's mission statement and said it's about "looking for a world where everyone is given a chance to fit in. This isn’t about leaning in or fighting for the top chair. It’s about making room."

Track five, "My Name Can't Be Mama", was written by Carlile, Morris, and Shires. It is an inclusive song about motherhood and parenting. The three women in the song all have their own definition of being a mother and each have their own reason for needing a break. For Carlile, it's a hard morning after a night of no sleep; for Shires, it's trying to find a career; and for Morris, it's a break from society's expectation to have children by a certain age (with an allusion to Carlile's "The Mother"). "If She Ever Leaves Me", the album's sixth track, was written by band member Amanda Shires with her husband Jason Isbell and Chris Tompkins. Isbell said that he came up with the idea while exercising and realized that if Carlile sang it they could have a singular "gay country song" moment. Rolling Stone called it "a love song that transcends sexuality while not ignoring it."

Track seven, "Old Soul", penned by Morris with Luke Dick and Laura Veltz, is an intimate look at the burdens of having to grow up too fast. The eighth track, "Don't Call Me", written by Shires and Peter Levin, is a reminder to not pick up the phone the next time an ex calls. "My Only Child", the album's ninth track, was written by members Hemby and Shires with Miranda Lambert. It is about the love a mother has for her child and her disappointment that her family ended up smaller than she had once dreamed it would. The album's tenth track, "Heaven Is a Honky Tonk", was written by members Carlile and Hemby with Ray LaMontagne, and features Sheryl Crow and background vocals by Yola. Track eleven, "Cocktail and a Song", is a solo composition from Shires about mortality and life's inevitabilities. The album closes with "The Wheels of Laredo", a song written by Carlile with Tim and Phil Hanseroth for Tanya Tucker's 2019 album, While I'm Livin'.

== Critical reception ==
Professional ratings
Aggregate scores
Source	Rating
Metacritic	80/100
Review scores
Source	Rating
AllMusic	4/5 stars
American Songwriter	3.5/5 stars
Consequence of Sound	B+
Exclaim!	8/10
The Guardian	3/5 stars
Pitchfork	7.7/10
PopMatters	7/10 stars
Rolling Stone	4/5 stars
Slant Magazine	3.5/5 stars
Us Weekly	4/4 stars

The album received mostly positive reviews from music critics. At Metacritic, which assigns a normalized rating out of 100 to reviews from mainstream publications, the album received a weighted average score of 80 based on 13 reviews.

Chris Willman from Variety called the album an "instant classic," and went on to say that "the all-star foursome has put together an album full of high comedy and high pathos, zingy group-sings and gut-wreching solo turns, wryness and rue, and harmony co-existing with this strange and nearly forgotten thing called twang." Laura Stanley at Exclaim! gave the album an 8 out of 10, and said the album "is both a call for change and a celebration of women in country music." Writing for AllMusic, Stephen Thomas Erlewine gave the album four out of five stars and said, "The record's resonance lies in its deep emotions and sense of craft. The craft isn't incidental, either. Their shared skills as writers and singers provide the supporting evidence to Shires' conceptual thesis: if country radio doesn't want to play music this good, what's the point of radio anyway?" Will Hermes from Rolling Stone gave the album four out of five stars. His review said, "What’s most impressive about The Highwomen, handsomely produced with Nashville neoclassicist Dave Cobb, is how artfully, and matter-of-factly, it engages social issues. Credit the concentration of songwriting talent. Every woman here is at the top of her game." The album received seven out of ten stars from Chris Conaton at PopMatters who said, "They're having a lot of fun, but the specifically feminist bent of the group's outlook helps focus the album as well. The Highwomen is worth a listen for any fans of these artists individually or as a sampler for all of them."

Seth Wilson from Slant Magazine gave the album three and a half out of five stars. He praised the album's title track, calling it "a powerful and succinct recalibration of Jimmy Webb’s 'The Highwayman'". The album received three and a half out of five stars from Hal Horowitz at American Songwriter. He said the album is "generally more subdued than the Lambert-led Pistol Annies and less groundbreaking than Trio. It would have helped if all four women participated in every performance since at least one is MIA on the majority of tunes." He criticized Dave Cobb's production, calling it "professional" but "also a little dry." In a review for Glide Magazine, Jim Hynes said the album "has its strong moments and it does carry a strong mission. Yet, its ambitious and inclusive scope creates an enormity that somewhat weighs it down." In a mixed review for The Guardian, Michael Hann gave the album three out of five stars and said, "Four voices aren’t always stronger than one, and the collegiate nature of the record leaves one yearning for a little more single-mindedness." Nicholas Hautman from Us Weekly gave the album four stars and called it an "instant classic."

The album won the International Album of the Year award at the 2020 UK Americana Music Awards.

=== Accolades ===
Accolades for The Highwomen
Publication	Accolade	Rank
Billboard	Top 50 Albums of 2019	8
Entertainment Weekly	Top 10 Albums of 2019	4
Rolling Stone	Top 100 of Albums of 2010s	77
Us Weekly	Top 10 Albums of 2019	5

== Commercial performance ==
The Highwomen debuted at number 10 on the US Billboard 200 with 34,000 album-equivalent units, including 29,000 pure album sales. It sold 8,100 copies in the second week. It has sold 86,100 copies in the United States as of March 2020.

== Track listing ==
The Highwomen track listing
No.	Title	Writer(s)	Lead vocals	Length
1.	"Highwomen" (featuring Yola)	Brandi Carlile; Amanda Shires; Jimmy Webb	Carlile; Shires; Hemby; Yola	3:32
2.	"Redesigning Women"	Natalie Hemby; Rodney Clawson	Carlile; Hemby; Morris; Shires	2:54
3.	"Loose Change"	Maren Morris; Maggie Chapman; Daniel Layus	Morris	2:22
4.	"Crowded Table"	Carlile; Hemby; Lori McKenna	Carlile; Hemby; Morris; Shires	3:29
5.	"My Name Can't Be Mama"	Carlile; Morris; Shires	Carlile; Morris; Shires	2:30
6.	"If She Ever Leaves Me"	Shires; Jason Isbell; Chris Tompkins	Carlile	3:13
7.	"Old Soul"	Morris; Luke Dick; Laura Veltz	Morris	5:45
8.	"Don't Call Me"	Shires; Peter Levin	Shires; Carlile	3:36
9.	"My Only Child"	Hemby; Shires; Miranda Lambert	Hemby	3:53
10.	"Heaven Is a Honky Tonk" (featuring Sheryl Crow)	Carlile; Hemby; Ray LaMontagne	Carlile; Hemby; Crow	3:54
11.	"Cocktail and a Song"	Shires	Shires	3:37
12.	"Wheels of Laredo"	Carlile; Tim Hanseroth; Phil Hanseroth	Carlile	4:14
Total length:				42:59

== Personnel ==
Adapted from the album liner notes.

The Highwomen

- Brandi Carlile – lead vocals, background vocals, acoustic guitar, piano
- Natalie Hemby – lead vocals, background vocals
- Maren Morris – lead vocals, background vocals
- Amanda Shires – lead vocals, background vocals, violin

Musicians

- Dave Cobb – producer, acoustic guitar, electric guitar
- Phil Hanseroth – background vocals, bass, acoustic guitar, percussion, tictac bass
- Tim Hanseroth – background vocals, acoustic guitar, electric guitar
- Jason Isbell – acoustic guitar, electric guitar
- Peter Levin – keyboards, Mellotron, piano, strings, Wurlitzer
- Chris Powell – drums, percussion

Guest vocalists

- Sheryl Crow – guest vocals, background vocals, bass
- Yola – guest vocals, background vocals

Additional personnel

- Daniel Bacigalupi – mastering assistant
- Brandon Bell – engineering
- Nicki Fletcher – graphic design
- Alysse Gafkjen – photography
- Tony Hulbert – engineering assistant
- Gena Johnson – engineering assistant
- Colin Lott – engineering assistant
- Pete Lyman – mastering

== Charts ==
=== Weekly charts ===
Weekly chart performance for The Highwomen
Chart (2019)	Peak position
Australian Digital Albums (ARIA)	12
Canadian Albums (Billboard)	31
Scottish Albums (Official Charts)	14
Swiss Albums (Schweizer Hitparade)	69
UK Albums (Official Charts)	92
UK Country Albums (Official Charts)	2
US Billboard 200	10
US Top Country Albums (Billboard)	1

=== Year-end charts ===
2019 year-end chart performance for The Highwomen
Chart (2019)	Position
US Top Country Albums (Billboard)	58
