= The Highwomen =

American country music group

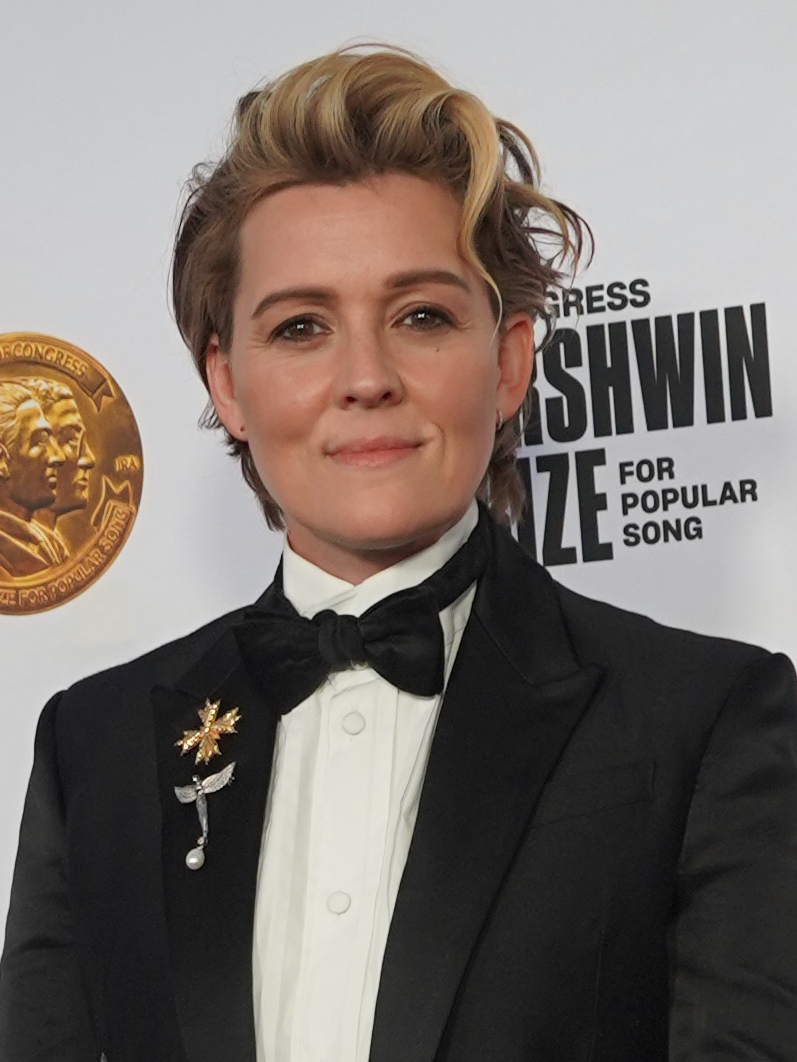
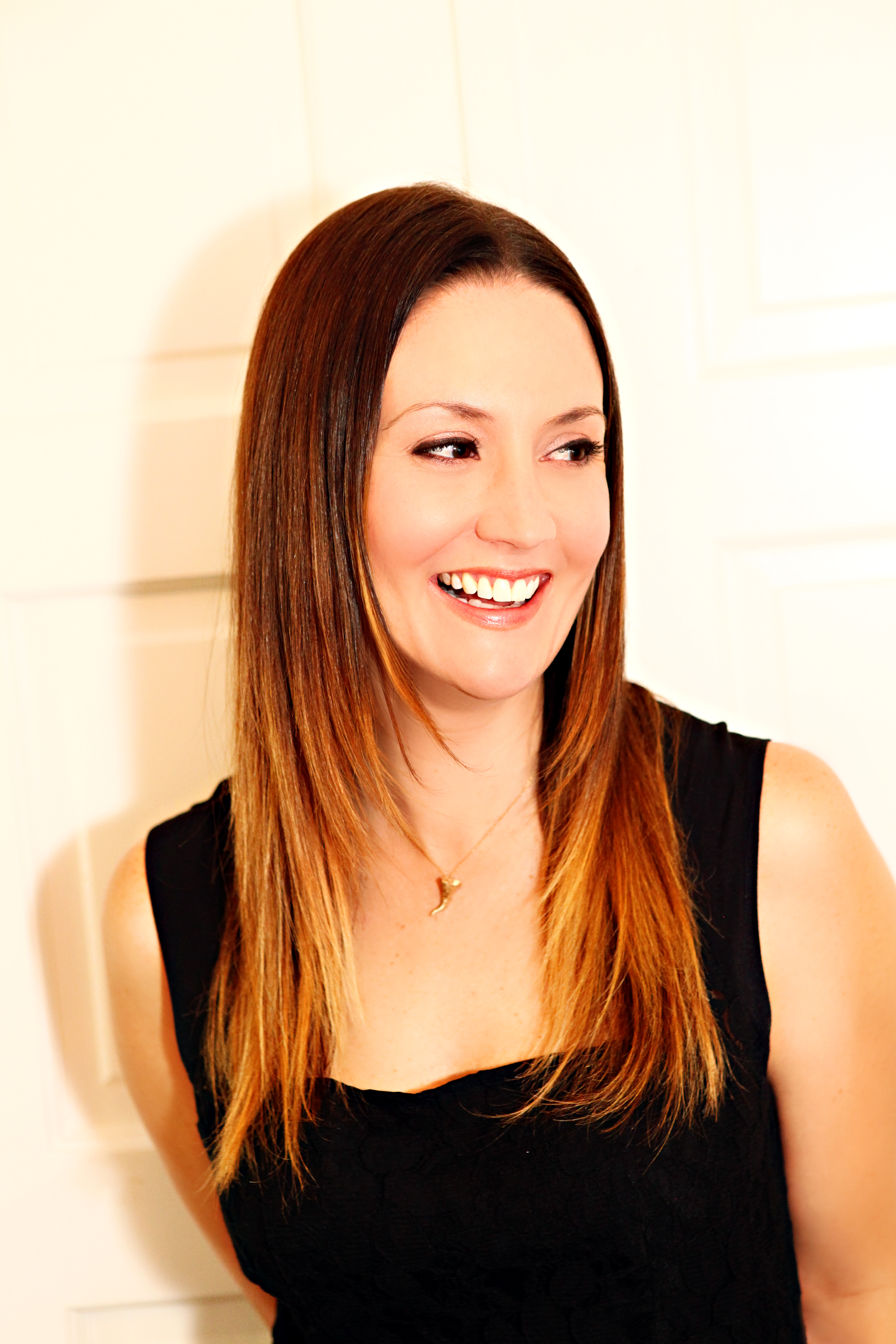
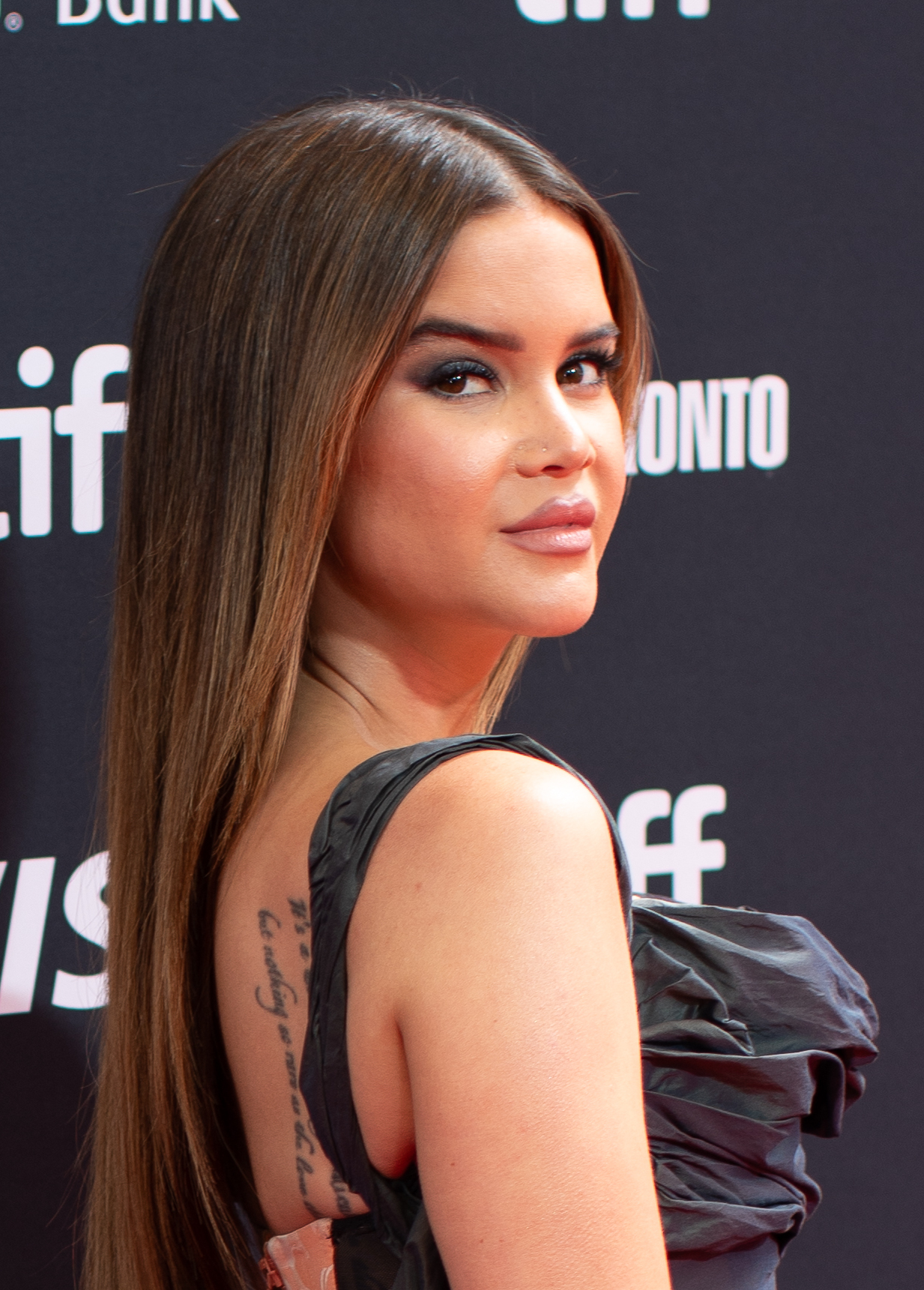
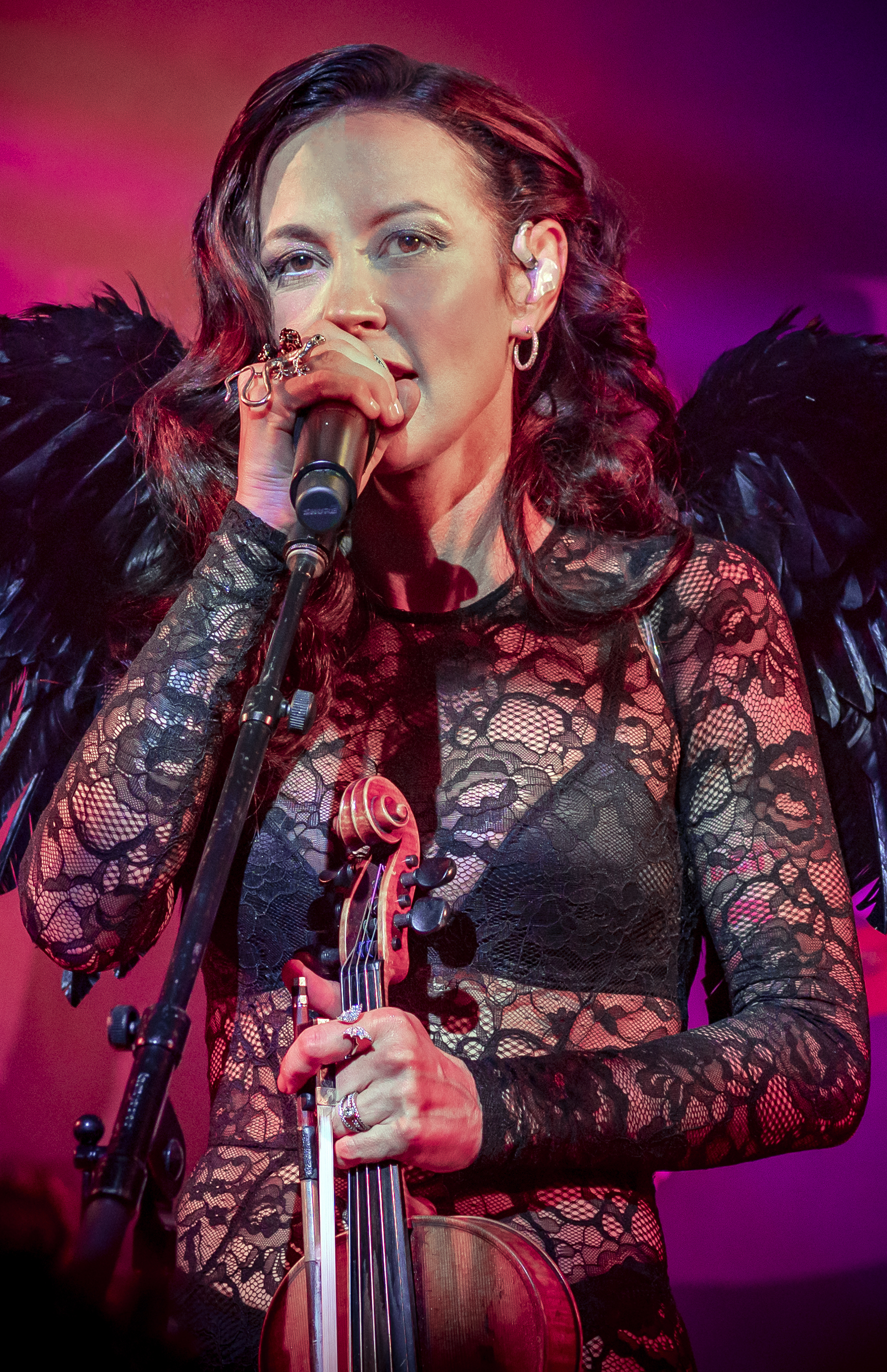
- Brandi Carlile Natalie Hemby Maren Morris Amanda Shires

Background information
- Origin: Nashville, Tennessee, United States
- Genres: Country; Americana
- Years active: 2019–present
- Label: Elektra
- Members: Brandi Carlile; Natalie Hemby; Maren Morris; Amanda Shires
- Website: thehighwomen.com

The Highwomen is an American country music supergroup composed of Brandi Carlile, Natalie Hemby, Maren Morris, and Amanda Shires. The group formed in 2019 when Shires, after studying the unbalanced prominence of male performers on radio playlists, met with Carlile at the recommendation of producer Dave Cobb to address the situation by forming a group. Naming the ensemble after 1980s outlaw country supergroup The Highwaymen, Shires and Carlile leveraged their recent successes and recruited top female country artist Morris and gifted songwriter Hemby to join them, mirroring the earlier group's star power. The Highwomen's self-titled debut album was produced by Cobb and released by Elektra Records on September 6, 2019.

== History ==
In 2016, when Shires was finishing her record My Piece of Land in music producer Dave Cobb's studio, she had an idea to create a female country supergroup, similar to the legendary Highwaymen supergroup consisting of Johnny Cash, Waylon Jennings, Kris Kristofferson and Willie Nelson. At the same time, the lack of representation of women artists on country music radio and at country music festivals had been publicly discussed by many, influenced by the MeToo movement and journalists like Marissa Moss. While on tour in her van, listening to country radio, Shires kept a running list of artists and noticed that there were few women. When she called to request they play more women artists, she was directed to a Facebook page lottery system. Cobb recommended Shires call Carlile, whom she didn't know. Carlile thought it would be fun, and would be an interesting creative project.

The Highwomen project was widely hinted at by Carlile, Morris and Shires before it was officially announced on April 6, 2019. With the name paying homage to The Highwaymen, the Highwomen were originally intended to leave the fourth spot in their line-up vacant to allow other female collaborators to join them, with Chely Wright, Courtney Marie Andrews, Margo Price, Janelle Monáe and Sheryl Crow mentioned as potential guests. The band, who jokingly refer to the collaboration as a pirate-ship experience, said that they see the project as an incubator project that highlights mentorship and support of fellow women artists.

Morris hadn't worked with Cobb before, and remarked on how much she liked tracking live. The band recorded live vocals, live band, harmonies in unison, where the musicians were recording together live in an organic environment at historic RCA Studio A, which Cobb now owns. As part of the experience, some of the members got matching Highwomen tattoos.

The group made their live debut on April 1, 2019 at Loretta Lynn's 87th birthday concert held at the Bridgestone Arena in Nashville. There, Natalie Hemby was officially revealed as the final member and the quartet performed "It Wasn't God Who Made Honky Tonk Angels". Their debut single, "Redesigning Women", and its associated music video featuring female artists including Tanya Tucker, Cam, Lauren Alaina, Cassadee Pope and Wynonna Judd was released on 19 July 2019, with their self-titled debut album (set for release on September 6) becoming available for pre-order on the same day. The song was promoted by country singer Dierks Bentley, who released a comedic reading of the lyrics to his YouTube Channel, which received praise from Carlile and Morris. Their second single, "Crowded Table", written by band member Hemby and Lori McKenna, was released on July 26, 2019.

In July 2019, the Highwomen performed their first ever full live set at the 60th annual Newport Folk Festival, previewing songs from their upcoming album including "If She Ever Leaves Me", written by Shires, her husband Jason Isbell and Chris Thompkins. With Carlile on lead vocals, Isbell described it as "the first gay country song", which elicited applause from the audience. Other songs performed included "My Only Child", an ode to "suburban moms" performed by Hemby, who wrote the track with Shires and Miranda Lambert; "Loose Change", a nod to '70s country written by Morris, Daniel Layus of Augustana, and Maggie Chapman, featuring Morris on lead vocals; and "Cocktail and a Song", which was written solely by Shires in honor of her father. Carlile later invited the rest of the Highwomen to join her during her headlining set, where, as they originally intended, the group performed alongside other female artists including Amy Ray, Courtney Marie Andrews, Dolly Parton, Jade Bird, Judy Collins, Linda Perry, Lucy Dacus, Our Native Daughters, Sheryl Crow, The First Ladies of Bluegrass, and Yola Carter. Shires said the plan was always to debut their music at Newport with Dolly Parton. The band wore custom suits by Manuel.

Their cover of "The Chain" by Fleetwood Mac from the soundtrack of the movie The Kitchen debuted during the film's first trailer and was officially released on August 2, 2019. The title track of their self-titled debut album was released on August 13, 2019. Written by Carlile and Shires with Jimmy Webb, the original writer of "Highwayman", the track that originally inspired the Highwomen's formation, it tells the story of various women throughout history and features guest vocals from British country soul singer Yola Carter and backing vocals from Sheryl Crow. The song is a classic answer song.

The band recorded 15 songs, but only 12 tracks made it on the album. Songwriters included the aforementioned Jimmy Webb, Rodney Clawson, Maggie Chapman, Lori McKenna, Jason Isbell, Peter Levin, Miranda Lambert, Ray LaMontagne, among many others. Many of the songs flip gender roles, with additions of characters like refugee, preacher, Freedom Rider, and a healer, compared to the characters drawn by the Highwaymen songs.

Following the release of their album, the band have infrequently performed together. In 2022, they performed "Somewhere Down The Road" at the Kennedy Center Honors in tribute to Amy Grant, who was one of the honorees. They also performed "Coal Miner's Daughter" during a tribute show on CMT following the death of Loretta Lynn, with Brittney Spencer standing in for Morris.

In September 2025, Amanda Shires stated that the group was reuniting in the studio to work on another album together.

In 2026, they performed at The Gorge.

== Discography ==
=== Studio albums ===
| Title | Details | Peak chart positions | | | | | | | Sales |
| Title | Details | US | US Cou. | US Folk | AUS Dig. | CAN | UK | UK Country | Sales |
|---|---|---|---|---|---|---|---|---|---|
| The Highwomen | Release date: September 6, 2019; Label: Elektra; Formats: CD, vinyl, digital download, streaming | 10 | 1 | 1 | 12 | 31 | 92 | 2 | US: 86,100 |

=== Live albums ===
Live at The Gorge 2023 (released May 29, 2026): A live recording from The Highwomen's 2023 performance at The Gorge Amphitheatre during Carlile's Echoes Through the Canyon concert series, with guest performances by Allison Russell, Brittney Spencer, and Tanya Tucker. Released ahead of The Highwomen's May 31 return to The Gorge as part of Echoes Through the Canyon 2026.

=== Singles ===
| Title | Year | Peak chart positions | | | Album |
| Title | Year | US Dig. | US Cou. | US AAA | Album |
|---|---|---|---|---|---|
| "Redesigning Women" | 2019 | — | 50 | — | The Highwomen |
| "Crowded Table" | 2019 | — | — | 31 | The Highwomen |
| "Highwomen" | 2019 | — | — | — | The Highwomen |
| "The Chain" (from The Kitchen) | 2019 | 46 | — (Note: "The Chain" did not enter the US Hot Country Songs chart but peaked at number nine on the Country Digital Song Sales chart.) | 28 | Non-album single |
| "Hold On" (with Yola featuring Sheryl Crow) | 2020 | — | — | — | Non-album single |

=== Guest appearances ===
| Title | Year | Other artist(s) | Album |
|---|---|---|---|
| "Highway Unicorn" | 2021 | Brittney Spencer and Madeline Edwards | Born This Way The Tenth Anniversary |

=== Music videos ===
| Title | Year |
|---|---|
| "Redesigning Women" | 2019 |
| "Crowded Table" | 2019 |

== Members ==
=== The Highwomen ===
- Brandi Carlile
- Natalie Hemby
- Maren Morris
- Amanda Shires

=== Honorary Highwomen ===
- Sheryl Crow
- Brittney Spencer
- Yola

=== Band ===
- Dave Cobb - production, acoustic guitar, electric guitar
- Phil Hanseroth - backing vocals, bass guitar, acoustic guitar, percussion
- Tim Hanseroth - backing vocals, acoustic guitar, electric guitar
- Jason Isbell - acoustic guitar, electric guitar
- Peter Levin - keyboards, piano, mellotron, strings, wurlitzer
- Chris Powell - drums, percussion

== Awards and nominations ==
| Year | Association | Category | Nominated work | Result |
|---|---|---|---|---|
| 2020 | Academy of Country Music Awards | Group of the Year | The Highwomen | Nominated |
| 2020 | Americana Music Honors & Awards | Duo/Group of the Year | The Highwomen | Won |
| 2020 | Americana Music Honors & Awards | Album of the Year | The Highwomen | Won |
| 2020 | Americana Music Honors & Awards | Song of the Year | "Crowded Table" | Won |
| 2020 | CMT Awards | Group Video of the Year | "Crowded Table" | Won |
| 2021 | Grammy Awards | Best Country Song | "Crowded Table" | Won |
| 2021 | Academy of Country Music Awards | Group of the Year | The Highwomen | Nominated |

== See also ==
- 2019 in country music
