= Coco Moon =

Studio album by Owl City
- Released: March 24, 2023
- Recorded: 2022
- Studios: Sky Harbor Studios, Owatonna, Minnesota
- Genre: Electropop
- Length: 55:14
- Label: Sky Harbor
- Producer: Adam Young

Owl City chronology
Cinematic (2018)	Coco Moon (2023)

Singles from Coco Moon
- 1. "Kelly Time" Released: January 6, 2023; 2. "Adam, Check Please" Released: February 3, 2023; 3. "Vitamin Sea" Released: March 3, 2023; 4. "Boston" Released: February 9, 2024; 5. "Car Trouble" Released: March 1, 2024

Coco Moon is the seventh studio album by American electronica project Owl City. It was released independently via Sky Harbor on March 24, 2023. The album was written and produced by Adam Young. The album is supported by three singles: "Kelly Time", "Adam, Check Please" and "Vitamin Sea". It is his first album in almost five years since his 2018 album, Cinematic.

A deluxe edition was released on March 22, 2024, which was preceded by two singles: "Boston" and "Car Trouble".

== Background and release ==
In June 2022, Young announced that he would be releasing new music soon, as early as fall 2022. He began making cryptic posts on the social media app Instagram, in the form of an ARG. Teasers were later released in October 2022. Young began recording Coco Moon sometime in 2022, before taking a short break to record a song titled "Up to the Cloud" for the mobile game Neural Cloud.

Young announced the title and release date of the album via social media on February 9, 2023. The album contains themes of "autobiographical", "metaphorical", and "odd" songs, according to Young, that refrain from pop culture or political references. Speaking about the overall meaning of the album, he stated;

"The point is that Coco Moon is a very Owl City album. It is quirky. It is odd. It is unapologetically myself. I made an album that is exactly the way it was supposed to be, not an album that popular culture or algorithms, or analytics, or anyone else on planet Earth told me to make. I wrote me. Average, ordinary, weird me."

"Kelly Time" was released on January 6, 2023, as the lead single from the album. The song was inspired by the 2000 film Cast Away and is about "being okay with not always knowing what's gonna happen", as Young says. The album's second single "Adam, Check Please" was released on February 3, 2023, which is about Young's first job when he was 17 years old. "Vitamin Sea" was released as the third and final single from the album on March 3, 2023. Young premiered a music video for the song on March 13, 2023. On December 22, 2023, "My Muse" was serviced for radio airplay.

On January 25, 2024, Young announced that a deluxe edition of Coco Moon would be released on March 22. The deluxe edition contained two new tracks: "Boston" and "Car Trouble", a new version of "Adam, Check Please", a live version of "Under The Circus Lights" and two instrumentals of "The Tornado" and "Dinosaur Park". He released "Boston" on February 9, a cover of the Augustana song. On March 1, Owl City released the fifth single from the album, "Car Trouble".

== Supporting tour ==
In support of the album, Young announced the 30-date To the Moon Tour that began in September and ended in early November 2023, with support from special guest Augustana. Owl City later announced a 3-date Japan leg of the tour which took place in February 2024. Coinciding with the release on March 22, 2024 of the Coco Moon deluxe edition, another (12-date) leg was added in the United States as the To The Moon Deluxe Tour, beginning on March 21 in Raleigh, N.C. and wrapping up on April 14, 2024 in Cleveland, Ohio.

== Composition ==
The album contains 11 tracks, all written and produced by Young. He shared the cover art and tracklist via social media on March 14, 2023. Young explained the meaning for some of the tracks from the album in an interview with PM Studio, including the singles and other cuts like "The Tornado". "Dinosaur Park" is the longest song Owl City has ever recorded, at 6 1/2 minutes, and has been described as a "more innocent" and "patient" song toning down on its electropop sound. "The Tornado" features a brief screamo breakdown which Young has dabbled at in previous side projects such as Aquarium and Novel. "Vitamin Sea" and "Learn How to Surf" are songs about recognizing how tough life can get and pushing through these moments. Other tracks such as "Sons of Thunder" incorporates faith into the lyrics: "You were made to run and not be faint, so take heart, wild one, for there is a God, who loves you to death, no matter what you've done, so don't lose hope 'cause He will lead you home."

== Critical reception ==
Professional ratings
Review scores
Source	Rating
AllMusic	3.5/5 stars
Jesus Freak Hideout	4.5/5 stars

Coco Moon was met with generally positive reviews from music critics. Joel Zaloum of Jesus Freak Hideout gave a positive review stating, "there's something all the more weighty at hand." He compared the album to Young's Scores series for its recognizable sound, patented guitar and synth tones. He described the third track "Kelly Time" as "Young's willingness to keep it simple, writing about everyday pleasures such as nostalgic movies." Other songs such as "Vitamin Sea" and "Learn How to Surf" were described as "carefree, radio-friendly tracks." "Sons of Thunder" and "The Meadow Lark" were described as the highlight and stand out points of the album. However, he did criticize the first track "Adam, Check Please" as a "seemingly mundane note." Overall, he remarked, "There's a beautiful balance between the outlandish and the practical, which should please fans of both camps. Young's addition of deeper spiritual themes, as well as movie-score tendencies, make this, perhaps, his finest work."

In another positive review by Matt Collar of AllMusic, he called the track "Adam, Check Please", a song that was "born out of his own midwestern Christian upbringing." He also described the song "Field Notes" as a track that feels "more like fables or a tale by Mark Twain." However he was critical on the track "Vitamin Sea" for its lack of "subtext" and how it is "likely to elicit a few groans." He ended off stating, "A cynic might at first think he is being ironic or messing with the listener. But no, while there is clearly cheeky humor at play throughout Coco Moon, Young, as with a lot of us, really just likes sand between his toes."

Ryan Reichard of PopCrush stated that the album features some "surprising sonic moments." "The Tornado" has gone on to become a fan-favorite from the album, many praising the song for its "unique production" and Young's "unexpected vocal performance." Dominik Dausch of the Argus Leader wrote on the song "Dinosaur Park" calling it, "a step toward a musically-rendered Night at the Museum set in the City of Presidents – though, the sculptures' depiction of dinosaurs might lack realism themselves."

== Track listing ==
All tracks are written by Adam Young.

Standard edition
No.	Title	Length
1.	"Adam, Check Please"	5:38
2.	"Under the Circus Lights"	5:04
3.	"Kelly Time"	5:29
4.	"Field Notes"	5:38
5.	"Sons of Thunder"	5:02
6.	"The Tornado"	4:49
7.	"Vitamin Sea"	4:38
8.	"Dinosaur Park"	6:31
9.	"Learn How to Surf"	3:40
10.	"The Meadow Lark"	5:08
11.	"My Muse"	3:33
Total length:		55:14

Deluxe edition
No.	Title	Length
12.	"Car Trouble"	5:13
13.	"Boston"	4:04
14.	"Adam, Check Please" (Up North version)	6:43
15.	"Under the Circus Lights" (live)	4:34
16.	"The Tornado" (instrumental)	4:47
17.	"Dinosaur Park" (instrumental)	6:31

== Credits and personnel ==
Credits retrieved from album's liner notes.

Owl City

- Adam Young – vocals, composer, lyricist, mixing, producer

Additional musicians

- Chris Carmichael – strings (3–4, 6, 10)
- Sissy Willow – additional vocals (1–2, 4, 6, 8–11)
- Colby McCallister – additional vocals (5, 7)

Additional personnel

- Mark Heimermann – arrangement, additional producer
- Ted Jensen – mastering (Sterling Sound, Nashville, Tennessee)
- Max Asabin – artwork
- Gabriel Chapa – artwork layout

== Charts ==
Chart performance for Coco Moon
Chart (2023)	Peak position
UK Album Downloads (Official Charts)	43
US Top Current Albums Sales (Billboard)	94

== Release history ==
Release formats for Coco Moon
Region	Date	Format(s)	Label	Ref.
Various	March 24, 2023	Cassette; CD; digital download; LP; streaming	Sky Harbor Records	
Various	March 22, 2024	Digital download; streaming	Sky Harbor Records	
