= Brittney Spencer =

American singer-songwriter (born 1988)

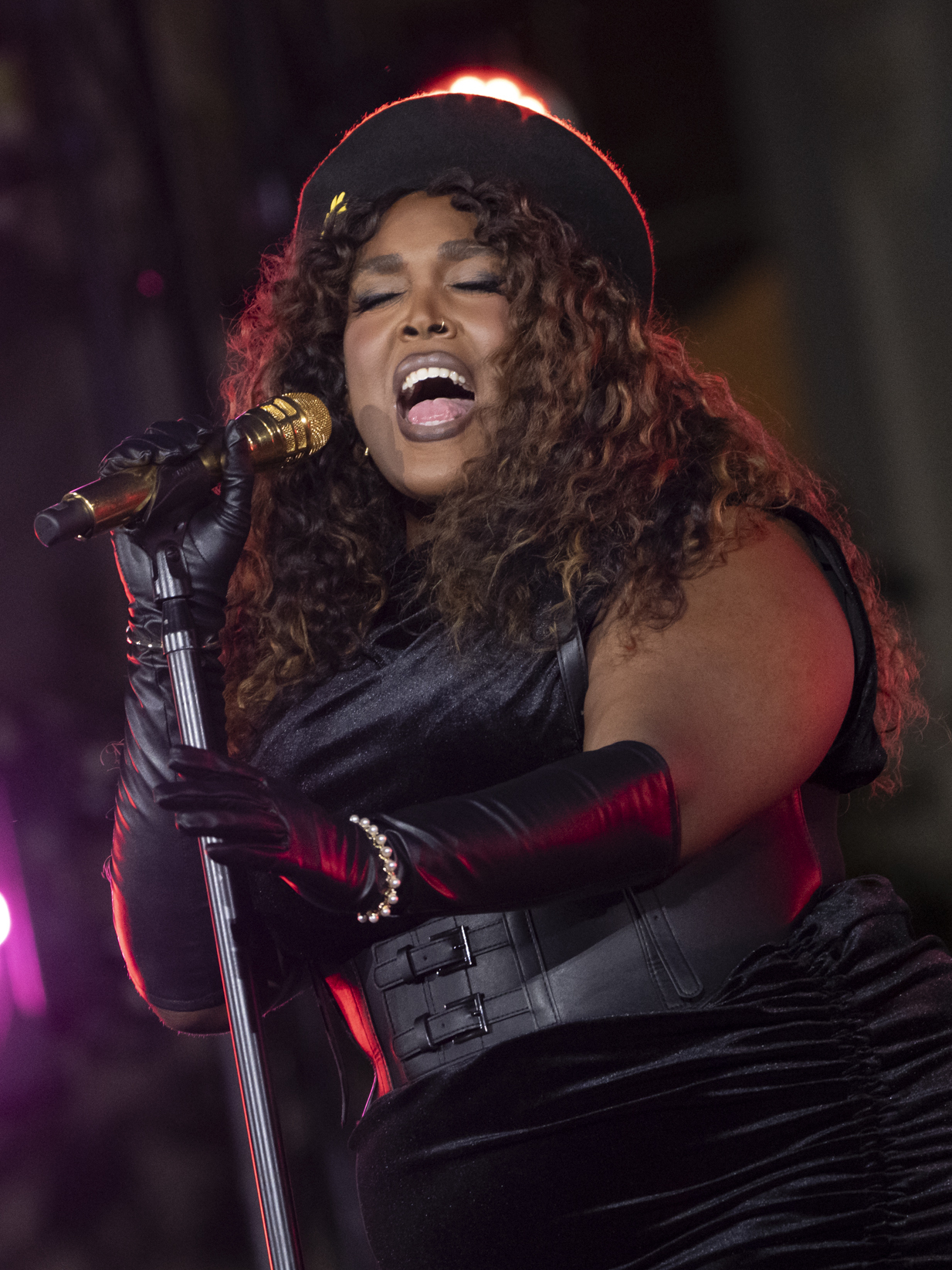
- Spencer performing at the White House in 2024

Background information
- Born: September 9, 1988 (age 37); Baltimore, Maryland, U.S.
- Genres: Country
- Occupation: Singer–songwriter
- Instruments: Vocals; guitar; piano
- Years active: 2020–present
- Labels: Common Exchange; Elektra
- Website: brittneyspencer.com

Brittney Spencer (born September 9, 1988) is an American country singer–songwriter. In 2020 Spencer received notable attention following a viral Twitter video showing Spencer singing a cover of a song by the Highwomen. The video drew praise from fellow country artists and prompted the release of her first extended play (EP) titled Compassion (2020). She has also released several singles, including 2021's "Sober & Skinny". Spencer has since performed on the Country Music Association Awards and has embarked on a world tour.

== Early life ==
Spencer, who is of African-American heritage, is a native of Baltimore, Maryland. She developed an interest in music from singing in church. "Church, for me, was very cultural. It’s spiritual, but also very cultural. Families like mine, we couldn’t really afford singing lessons or anything like that, so I just sang in the church all the time," she told Baltimore magazine. She was raised as an African Methodist Episcopal. Spencer also came from a musical family. Her father was part of a quartet band. A friend from church got Spencer interested in The Chicks, which developed her interest in country music. From there, she developed interest in artists like Taylor Swift. She attended magnet schools in her teen years, including the George Washington Carver Center for Arts and Technology. During this time she learned to play guitar and piano. Spencer also took vocal lessons from a coach who taught her how to sing in a recording studio. She began by singing background vocals for R&B and gospel artists including Jason Nelson. In February 2013, Spencer moved to Nashville, Tennessee, to pursue country music full-time.

== Career ==
After moving to Nashville, Spencer attended Middle Tennessee State University. While attending the university she worked as a vocal coach in a program dedicated to students from low-income homes. She also found work as a background singer and eventually toured with Christopher Cross and Carrie Underwood. She also performed in clubs and other performance venues in the Nashville area. Despite performance opportunities, Spencer found it difficult pursuing country music as an overweight and black performer. "Being a Black woman in Nashville can be challenging when it comes time to book someone to do all sorts of things related to fashion, whether it’s glam or wardrobe. I do feel that systemic or societal pressure at times, but I also feel really empowered," she told Glamour.

In 2020 Spencer received significant attention after posting a cover of The Highwomen's "Crowded Table" on Twitter. The video received more than 150,000 views and re-tweeted by Maren Morris and Amanda Shires who praised Spencer's performance. "I just love to sing and write songs. Though there’s really no way I could have ever prepared for the most humbling experience of my life to take place on Twitter," she told Billboard. In 2020, Spencer released her debut extended play (EP) titled Compassion. The project included several songs including "Damn Right, You're Wrong" and "My Perfect Life". During this time, she also launched her first tour titled "In a Perfect World". In June 2021, Spencer released a new single called "Sober & Skinny". In late 2021, Spencer performed alongside Mickey Guyton and Madeline Edwards on the 55th Annual Country Music Association Awards. The trio sang a track off Guyton's Remember Her Name album called "Love My Hair". She is expecting to release her first full-length album in 2022. Spencer performed at the 57th Academy of Country Music Awards. In March 2022 she was nominated by the CMT Music Awards, her first award from a major industry.

In November 2022, Spencer signed a major label recording contract with Elektra Records. An extended play was released the following day, featuring original material and a cover of The Chicks's "Cowboy Take Me Away".

== Musical style and influences ==
Spencer told American Songwriter that her musical style is diverse because of the different artists and songwriters she is influenced by: "I feel like I have a really wide stretch of what influences me, which is probably why it still made my songs sound so different." In describing her musical style, Marcus K. Dowling explained that Spencer combines a "thundering power of her talent blended with highly engaging songs". She credits Beyoncé, Ray Charles, Miranda Lambert and Jazmine Sullivan as influences on her artistry.

== Discography ==
=== Studio albums ===
List of studio albums, showing relevant details
Title	Album details
My Stupid Life	Released: January 19, 2024; Label: Elektra; Formats: Digital

=== Extended plays ===
List of EPs, showing relevant details
Title	EP details
Compassion	Released: December 4, 2020; Label: Common Exchange; Formats: Digital
If I Ever Get There: A Day at Blackbird Studio	Released: November 4, 2022; Label: Elektra; Formats: Digital

=== Singles ===
List of singles, showing all relevant details
Title	Year	Album	Ref.
"Mothers and Shepherds" (with Common Hymnal)	2019	—N/a	
"Damn Right, You're Wrong"	2020	Compassion	
"Sorrys Don't Work No More"	2020	Compassion	
"Sober & Skinny"	2021	—N/a	
"More Than Perfect"	2022	—N/a	
"Wake Me Up (A Fever Dream)"	2022	—N/a	
"Night In"	2024	My Stupid Life	

=== Other album appearances ===
List of additional album appearances, showing all relevant details
Title	Year	Artist(s)	Album	Ref.
"Highway Unicorn (Road to Love)"	2021	The Highwomen and Madeline Edwards	Born This Way The Tenth Anniversary	
"Midnight Train to Georgia" "It's a Man's Man's Man's World"	2021	Jason Isbell and the 400 Unit	Georgia Blue	
"Lonely at Night"	2022	Amanda Shires	Take It Like a Man	
"Blackbiird"	2024	Beyoncé, Reyna Roberts, Tanner Adell and Tiera Kennedy	Cowboy Carter	

=== Music videos ===
List of music videos, showing year released and director
Title	Year	Director(s)	Ref.
"Sober & Skinny"	2021	Nicki Fletcher; Darryl Hargrove	

== Awards and nominations ==
Year	Award	Work	Category	Result	Ref.
2022	CMT Music Awards	"Sober & Skinny"	CMT Digital First Performance of the Year	Nominated	
2022	Americana Music Honors & Awards	Herself	Emerging Artist of the Year	Nominated	
2024	CMT Music Awards	"Bigger Than The Song"	Female Breakthrough Video of the Year	Nominated	
2024	People's Choice Country Awards	"Blackbiird" (with Beyoncé, Tanner Adell, Tiera Kennedy and Reyna Roberts)	The Collaboration Song of 2024	Nominated	
2024	People's Choice Country Awards	"Blackbiird" (with Beyoncé, Tanner Adell, Tiera Kennedy and Reyna Roberts)	The Cover Song of 2024	Nominated	
