= All the Stars and Boulevards =

Studio album by Augustana
- Released: September 6, 2005
- Recorded: November – December 2004
- Studios: Southern Tracks Recording, Atlanta, GA; The Apple Store, Los Angeles, California
- Genres: Rock, indie rock, roots rock
- Length: 41:25
- Label: Epic
- Producer: Brendan O'Brien

Augustana chronology
You'll Disappear EP (2005)	All the Stars and Boulevards (2005)	Can't Love, Can't Hurt EP (2008)

Singles from All the Stars and Boulevards
- 1. "Stars and Boulevards" Released: October 4, 2005; 2. "Boston" Released: January 17, 2006

All the Stars and Boulevards is the debut album by American rock band Augustana The album was released September 6, 2005, by Epic Records.

The album's release went largely unnoticed at the time. However, the single "Boston" was used during an episode of the CW series One Tree Hill in 2006 and propelled the band into national prominence. As a result, the song was used in several other MTV and VH1 shows, and Augustana was selected as a "You Oughta Know" band by VH1. The album was then selectively re-released on September 12, 2006. "Boston" continued to be used on television into 2007, including in episodes of the series Scrubs, Shark, and The Big Bang Theory.

== Critical reception ==
Professional ratings
Review scores
Source	Rating
AllMusic	2.5/5 stars
Rolling Stone	2.5/5 stars

All the Stars and Boulevards garnered a mixed reception from music critics. Gavin Edwards of Rolling Stone found the production, honest lyrics and guitar work mixing well with each other in O'Brien's control, saying that "Augustana are ready for their guest appearance on just about any WB show (OK, maybe not Reba)." Tim Sendra of AllMusic said that the band's influences that make up their overall sound felt inauthentic, with production, instrumentals and vocal dexterity being put through the studio cycle. But Sendra said that "the album is still listenable in a strange kind of way[,] since the lack of any distinguishing features allows the music to be perfect background music." Bud Scoppa of Paste said that, despite the album being well produced, he found dissonance between the lyrics and instruments mixing together.

== Track listing ==
All tracks are written by Augustana (Daniel Layus, Josiah Rosen, Jared Palomar, Justin South).

No.	Title	Length
1.	"Mayfield"	3:16
2.	"Bullets"	3:11
3.	"Hotel Roosevelt"	3:50
4.	"Boston"	4:06
5.	"Stars and Boulevards"	4:21
6.	"Feel Fine"	3:45
7.	"Wasteland"	3:59
8.	"Lonely People"	3:48
9.	"Sunday Best"	3:22
10.	"California's Burning"	3:45
11.	"Coffee and Cigarettes"	4:02

== Re-release ==
The re-released version of the album includes a re-mixed version of "Wasteland," a new track titled "Marie," and live acoustic versions of "Boston" and "Stars and Boulevards."

== Personnel ==
=== Musicians ===
Augustana is Dan Layus, Josiah Rosen, Jared Palomar, and Justin South.

- Dan Layus – vocals, guitar, piano
- Josiah Rosen – guitar, vocals
- Jared Palomar – bass guitar, vocals, keyboards
- Justin South – drums, percussion
- Brendan O'Brien – keyboards, percussion, backing vocals, mandolin, slide guitar, production

=== Production ===
- Produced and mixed by Brendan O'Brien
- All songs recorded by Nick Didia
- Second engineer: Karl Egsieker
- Additional engineering: Billy Bowers
- Assistant engineer: Tom Tapley
- Mastered by Bob Ludwig at Gateway Mastering, Portland, ME
- A&R: Pete Giberga
- A&R coordinator: Samantha Benerofe
- Management: Michael Rosenblatt and Stephen Short for That Guy Management (currently known as Ping Pong Music)
