= List of Owl City concert tours =

2009-2018 Owl City concerts

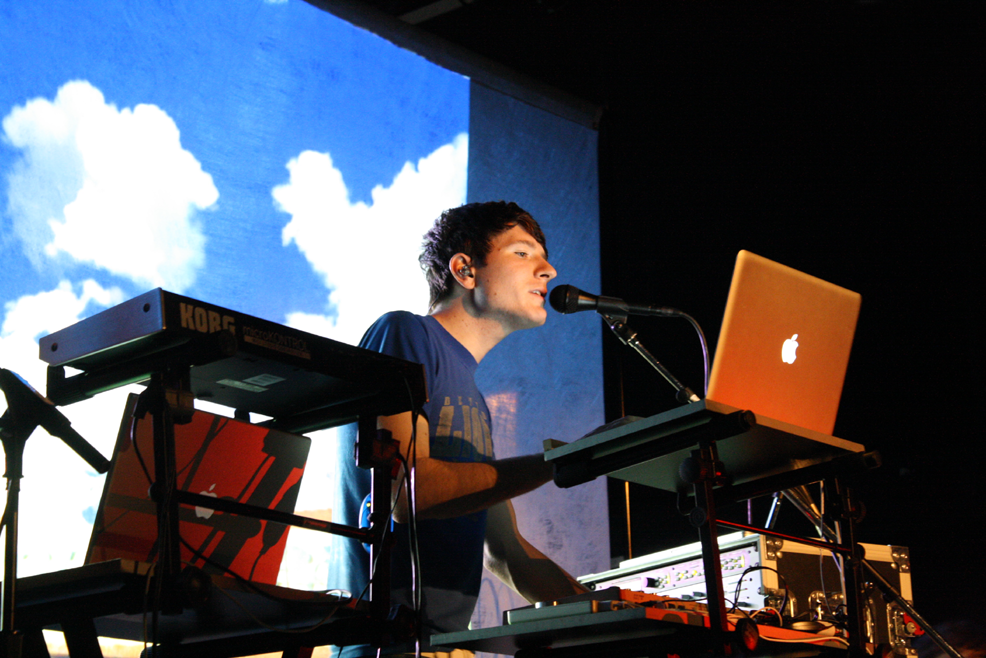
Owl City performing in 2009 at the Bowery Ballroom

Owl City has toured several places such as North America, Europe, Asia, Australia, and New Zealand. This list contains a collection of tours that Owl City has completed between the years of 2009 and 2018. The list contains the date, city, country, and venue performed in. It also contains everyone who opened for Owl City throughout all of the tours, such as Kate Havnevik and Unicorn Kid in 2009, and The Scene Aesthetic also in 2009. Owl City released his 8th album in 2023, titled Coco Moon, making it his first album in 5 years. He announced the To the Moon Tour to support the album.

== 2009 tours ==
Date	City	Country	Venue
North American Fall Tour
with Kate Havnevik and Unicorn Kid
September 9, 2009	Nashville	United States	Rocketown
September 10, 2009	Atlanta	United States	The Loft
September 11, 2009	Carrboro	United States	Cat's Cradle
September 12, 2009	Washington, D.C.	United States	Rock and Roll Hotel
September 14, 2009	Toronto	Canada	El Mocambo
September 15, 2009	New York City	United States	Bowery Ballroom
September 17, 2009	South Hackensack	United States	School of Rock
September 18, 2009	Boston	United States	Paradise Rock Club
September 19, 2009	Chester	United States	The Note West
September 21, 2009	Cleveland	United States	Grog Shop
September 22, 2009	Pontiac	United States	Eagle Theater
September 24, 2009	Grand Rapids	United States	The Intersection
September 25, 2009	Chicago	United States	The Metro
September 26, 2009	Minneapolis	United States	The Cabooze
September 27, 2009	Milwaukee	United States	The Rave
with The Scene Aesthetic and Brooke Wagonner
October 8, 2009	Des Moines	United States	House of Bricks
October 9, 2009	Omaha	United States	The Waiting Room
October 10, 2009	Denver	United States	Bluebird Theater
October 12, 2009	Boise	United States	The Venue
October 13, 2009	Spokane	United States	Service Station
October 15, 2009	Vancouver	Canada	Biltmore Cabaret
October 16, 2009	Seattle	United States	Neumo's
October 17, 2009	Portland	United States	Hawthorne Theatre
October 19, 2009	San Francisco	United States	Slim's
October 20, 2009	West Hollywood	United States	Troubadour
October 22, 2009	Anaheim	United States	House of Blues
October 23, 2009	San Diego	United States	The Epicentre
October 24, 2009	Scottsdale	United States	Martini Ranch
October 25, 2009	Albuquerque	United States	Launchpad
October 27, 2009	Tulsa	United States	The Marquee
October 28, 2009	Dallas	United States	Cambridge Room
October 29, 2009	Dallas	United States	Cambridge Room
October 30, 2009	Austin	United States	Emo's Alternative Lounge
October 31, 2009	Houston	United States	Meridian
November 1, 2009	Norman	United States	University of Oklahoma – McCasland Field House (free concert)
November 28, 2009	Honolulu	United States	Pipeline Cafe
December 15, 2009	San Antonio		Not So Silent Night
Mae Japan Tour 2009 Opening act
November 24, 2009	Tokyo	Japan	Shibuya Club Quattro
November 25, 2009	Osaka	Japan	Shinsaibashi Club Quattro
November 26, 2009	Nagoya	Japan	Nagoya Club Quattro

== 2010 tours ==
Date	City	Country	Venue
North American Tour (1st leg) with Lights
January 21, 2010	Kansas City	United States	Beaumont Club
January 22, 2010	Oklahoma City	United States	Diamond Ballroom
January 24, 2010	Indianapolis	United States	Murat Center
January 26, 2010	Madison	United States	Majestic Theatre
January 27, 2010	Cincinnati	United States	20th Century Theatre
January 28, 2010	Columbus	United States	Newport Music Hall
January 29, 2010	Towson	United States	Recher Theatre
January 30, 2010	Norfolk	United States	The NorVa
February 1, 2010	Charleston	United States	Music Farm
February 2, 2010	Jacksonville	United States	Freebird Live
February 3, 2010	St. Petersburg	United States	State Theatre
February 4, 2010	Fort Lauderdale	United States	Culture Room
February 5, 2010	Orlando	United States	House of Blues
February 6, 2010	Athens	United States	The Melting Point
February 8, 2010	Birmingham	United States	WorkPlay Theatre
February 9, 2010	Baton Rouge	United States	Varsity Theatre
February 10, 2010	Little Rock	United States	Revolution
February 14, 2010	Baltimore	United States	UMBC
UK Winter tour with Lights
February 17, 2010	Brighton	United Kingdom	Komedia
February 18, 2010	London	United Kingdom	Electric Ballroom
February 19, 2010	Oxford	United Kingdom	O2 Academy
February 20, 2010	Newcastle upon Tyne	United Kingdom	O2 Academy
February 21, 2010	Birmingham	United Kingdom	O2 Academy
February 22, 2010	Manchester	United Kingdom	Manchester Academy
European tour with Lights
February 24, 2010	Amsterdam	Netherlands	Melkweg
February 25, 2010	Brussels	Belgium	Le Botanique – Salle de l'Orangerie
February 26, 2010	Paris	France	Le Nouveau Casino
February 27, 2010	Cologne	Germany	Gloria
February 28, 2010	Munich	Germany	59:1
March 1, 2010	Berlin	Germany	Magnet Club
March 2, 2010	Copenhagen	Denmark	Amager Bio
Philippine, Australia & New Zealand Winter Tour with Lights
March 12, 2010	Auckland	New Zealand	Auckland Town Hall
March 14, 2010	Manila	Philippines	TriNoma
March 16, 2010	Sydney	Australia	UNSW Roundhouse
March 17, 2010	Brisbane	Australia	The Tivoli
March 19, 2010	Melbourne	Australia	The HiFi
March 20, 2010	Melbourne	Australia	The HiFi
March 21, 2010	Perth	Australia	Metro City
North American tour (2nd leg) with Lights
March 30, 2010	Boise	United States	Knitting Factory
March 31, 2010	Spokane	United States	Knitting Factory
April 1, 2010	Seattle	United States	Paramount Theater
April 2, 2010	Vancouver	Canada	The Centre
April 3, 2010	Portland	United States	Roseland Theater
April 5, 2010	San Francisco	United States	The Fillmore
April 6, 2010	San Francisco	United States	The Fillmore
April 7, 2010	Pomona	United States	Fox Theater
April 8, 2010	San Diego	United States	Soma
April 9, 2010	Los Angeles	United States	Club Nokia
April 10, 2010	Phoenix	United States	Marquee Theatre
April 12, 2010	Magna	United States	The Great Saltair
April 13, 2010	Denver	United States	Ogden Theatre
April 14, 2010	Tulsa	United States	Reynolds Center
April 15, 2010	Austin	United States	Stubb's BBQ
April 17, 2010	Dallas	United States	Nokia Theatre
April 19, 2010	Nashville	United States	War Memorial
April 20, 2010	Atlanta	United States	The Tabernacle
April 22, 2010	Washington, D.C.	United States	DAR Constitution Hall
April 23, 2010	Boston	United States	House of Blues
April 24, 2010	New York City	United States	Terminal 5
April 25, 2010	Philadelphia	United States	Electric Factory
April 27, 2010	Toronto	Canada	Sound Academy
April 28, 2010	Cleveland	United States	House of Blues
April 29, 2010	Royal Oak	United States	Royal Oak Music Theatre
April 30, 2010	Chicago	United States	Aragon Ballroom
May 1, 2010	Minneapolis	United States	State Theater two shows
May 2, 2010	Milwaukee	United States	Eagles Ballroom
May 4, 2010	Des Moines	United States	Val Air Ballroom
May 5, 2010	St. Louis	United States	The Pageant (rescheduled from January 23, 2010)
European Spring tour with Lights
May 8, 2010	Glasgow	United Kingdom	Barrowlands
May 9, 2010	London	United Kingdom	O_{2} Shepherd's Bush Empire
May 11, 2010	Paris	France	Élysée Montmartre
May 12, 2010	Cologne	Germany	E-Werk
North American tour (3rd leg)
August 4, 2010	Toronto	Canada	Molson Amphitheater
~~August 5, 2010~~	Clarkston	United States	DTE Energy Music Theater
August 6, 2010	Noblesville	United States	Verizon Wireless Music Center
August 7, 2010	Canandaigua	United States	CMAC
August 9, 2010	Mansfield	United States	Comcast Center
August 11, 2010	Wantagh	United States	Nikon at Jones Beach Theater
August 13, 2010	Bristow	United States	Jiffy Lube Live
August 14, 2010	Camden	United States	Susquehanna Bank Center
August 15, 2010	Holmdel	United States	PNC Bank Arts Center
August 18, 2010	Phoenix	United States	Cricket Wireless Pavilion
August 20, 2010	Mountain View	United States	Shoreline Amphitheatre
August 21, 2010	Wheatland	United States	Sleep Train Amphitheatre
August 22, 2010	Los Angeles	United States	Hollywood Bowl
August 24, 2010	Irvine	United States	Verizon Wireless Amphitheater
August 25, 2010	Chula Vista	United States	Cricket Wireless Amphitheatre
August 28, 2010	Honolulu	United States	Pipeline Cafe
August 31, 2010	Salt Lake City	United States	USANA Amphitheatre
September 1, 2010	Morrison	United States	Red Rocks Amphitheatre
September 4, 2010	Dallas	United States	SuperPages.com Center
September 5, 2010	The Woodlands	United States	Cynthia Woods Mitchell Pavilion
September 6, 2010	Orange Beach	United States	Amphitheater at the Wharf
September 8, 2010	Atlanta	United States	Aaron's Amphitheatre at Lakewood
September 10, 2010	Tampa	United States	Ford Amphitheatre
September 11, 2010	West Palm Beach	United States	Cruzan Amphitheater
September 18, 2010	West Springfield	United States	Eastern States Exposition
October 31, 2010	Owatonna	United States	Owatonna Senior High School
Asian Fall tour
November 4, 2010	Osaka	Japan	Big Cat
November 5, 2010	Nagoya	Japan	Club Quattro
November 6, 2010	Tokyo	Japan	Shibuya AX
2010 Australia & New Zealand Fall tour Due to scheduling conflicts, Owl City postponed its fall Australian tour.
November 9, 2010	Sydney	Australia	~~Enmore~~
November 10, 2010	Melbourne	Australia	~~Palais~~
November 11, 2010	Brisbane	Australia	~~Tivoli~~
November 13, 2010	Auckland	New Zealand	~~Powerstation~~

== 2011 tours ==
Date	City	Country	Venue
All Things Bright and Beautiful North American Tour with Mat Kearney and Unwed Sailor
June 13, 2011	Nashville	United States	Ryman Auditorium
June 14, 2011	Atlanta	United States	The Tabernacle
June 16, 2011	Orlando	United States	House of Blues
June 17, 2011	Charlotte	United States	Fillmore
June 18, 2011	Baltimore	United States	Tabernacle
June 20, 2011	Montreal	Canada	Olympia
June 21, 2011	Toronto	Canada	Kool Haus
June 23, 2011	New York City	United States	Roseland Ballroom
June 25, 2011	Philadelphia	United States	The Mann
June 26, 2011	Boston	United States	House of Blues
June 28, 2011	Indianapolis	United States	Egyptian Room
June 29, 2011	Detroit	United States	Fillmore
June 30, 2011	Milwaukee	United States	Summerfest
July 1, 2011	Columbus	United States	Lifestyle Communities Pavilion
July 2, 2011	Mount Union	United States	Creation Festival
July 11, 2011	Kansas City	United States	Uptown Theater
July 12, 2011	Denver	United States	Fillmore Auditorium
July 13, 2011	Salt Lake City	United States	McKay Event Center
July 15, 2011	Seattle	United States	Paramount Theatre
July 16, 2011	Vancouver	Canada	The Centre
July 17, 2011	Portland	United States	Roseland Ballroom
July 19, 2011	San Francisco	United States	Warfield Theatre
July 21, 2011	Los Angeles	United States	Club Nokia
July 23, 2011	Pomona	United States	Pomona Fox Theater
July 25, 2011	Houston	United States	Verizon Wireless Theater
July 26, 2011	Grand Prairie	United States	Verizon Theatre at Grand Prairie
July 27, 2011	Austin, Texas	United States	ACL Live
July 29, 2011	Chicago	United States	Aragon Ballroom
July 30, 2011	Saint Paul	United States	Roy Wilkins Auditorium
All Things Bright and Beautiful Australia & New Zealand Tour Supported by New Empire
August 12, 2011	Auckland	New Zealand	Auckland Town Hall
August 15, 2011	Brisbane	Australia	The Tivoli
August 16, 2011	Sydney	Australia	The Metro Theatre
August 17, 2011	Melbourne	Australia	Billboard
August 18, 2011	Melbourne	Australia	Billboard
All Things Bright and Beautiful European Tour
September 5, 2011	Dublin	Ireland	The Academy
September 7, 2011	Glasgow	Scotland	O_{2} ABC
September 8, 2011	Manchester	England	Academy
September 10, 2011	London	England	O_{2} Shepherd's Bush Empire
September 12, 2011	Leeds	England	The Cockpit
September 13, 2011	Birmingham	England	HMV Institute
September 15, 2011	Tilburg	Netherlands	013
September 16, 2011	Brussels	Belgium	Ancienne Belgique
September 17, 2011	Paris	France	Bataclan
September 19, 2011	Madrid	Spain	Ramdall
September 20, 2011	Lisbon	Portugal	Campo Pequeno bullring
September 22, 2011	Barcelona	Spain	Apolo 2
September 24, 2011	Milan	Italy	Magazzini Generali
September 26, 2011	Zürich	Switzerland	Abart
September 27, 2011	Munich	Germany	Theaterfabrik
September 29, 2011	Vienna	Austria	Vienna Arena
September 30, 2011	Berlin	Germany	Postbahnhof
October 1, 2011	Cologne	Germany	Gloria Theatre
October 2, 2011	Hamburg	Germany	Gruenspan
October 4, 2011	Copenhagen	Denmark	Vega
October 5, 2011	Stockholm	Sweden	Berns
All Things Bright and Beautiful Asian Tour
October 20, 2011	Osaka	Japan	Big Cat
October 21, 2011	Nagoya	Japan	Club Quattro
October 22, 2011	Tokyo	Japan	Shinagawa Prince Stellar Ball
October 24, 2011	Seoul	South Korea	Melon AX Hall
October 26, 2011	Manila	Philippines	NBC Tent, Fort Bonifacio
October 28, 2011	Jakarta	Indonesia	Tennis Indoor Senayan
All Things Bright and Beautiful American Tour
October 31, 2011	Honolulu	United States	Hawaii Theatre
November 4, 2011	Oklahoma City	United States	Diamond Ballroom
November 19, 2011	Minneapolis	United States	University of Minnesota Fieldhouse
November 20, 2011	Waukesha	United States	Carroll University

== 2012 tours ==
Date	City	Country	Venue
Owl City – Promo Tour
January 25, 2012	Anchorage	United States	Bear Tooth Theatre
January 28, 2012	Pattaya	Thailand	Silverlake Music Festival
June 2, 2012	Rio de Janeiro	Brazil	Circo Voador
June 29, 2012	Mason	United States	SpiritSong Fest
June 30, 2012	Doswell	United States	Kings Dominion's Kingswood Amphitheatre
July 9, 2012	Toronto	Canada	Mod Club
July 10, 2012	New York City	United States	Bowery Ballroom
July 12, 2012	Chicago	United States	Bottom Lounge
July 13, 2012	Minneapolis	United States	Varsity Theatre
July 15, 2012	Denver	United States	Bluebird Theatre
July 18, 2012	Los Angeles	United States	Greek Theatre
July 20, 2012	Sacramento	United States	Endfest 2012 – Power Balance Pavilion
July 21, 2012	San Francisco	United States	Slim's
July 23, 2012	Seattle	United States	Triple Door
July 27, 2012	Niigata	Japan	Fuji Rock Festival
July 28, 2012	Icheon	South Korea	Jisan Festival
July 31, 2012	Copenhagen	Denmark	Vega
August 1, 2012	Berlin	Germany	Lido
August 2, 2012	Cologne	Germany	Werkstatt
August 4, 2012	Utrecht	Netherlands	Tivoli de Helling
August 6, 2012	London	United Kingdom	KCLSU
The Midsummer Station 2012 World Tour
September 5, 2012	Nashville	United States	Cannery
September 6, 2012	Atlanta	United States	Center Stage
September 7, 2012	Orlando	United States	Beacham Theatre
September 8, 2012	Fort Lauderdale	United States	Revolution Live
September 10, 2012	Washington, D.C.	United States	9:30 Club
September 11, 2012	New York City	United States	Irving Plaza
September 13, 2012	Boston	United States	Paradise Lounge
September 14, 2012	Philadelphia	United States	Theatre of The Living Arts
September 15, 2012	Toronto	Canada	Phoenix Concert Hall
September 16, 2012	Columbus	United States	Newport Music Hall
September 18, 2012	Houston |rowspan="2"|House of Blues	United States	
September 19, 2012	Dallas	United States	
September 20, 2012	Austin	United States	La Zona Rosa
September 22, 2012	San Diego	United States	House of Blues
September 24, 2012	Los Angeles	United States	The Fonda Theatre
September 25, 2012	Anaheim	United States	House of Blues
September 26, 2012	San Francisco	United States	The Regency Center
September 28, 2012	Vancouver	Canada	Commodore Ballroom
September 29, 2012	Seattle	United States	Neptune Theatre
October 1, 2012	Salt Lake City	United States	The Depot
October 2, 2012	Denver	United States	Ogden Theatre
October 4, 2012	Minneapolis	United States	First Avenue
October 5, 2012	Kansas City	United States	Beaumont
October 6, 2012	Chicago	United States	The Vic Theatre
October 7, 2012	Detroit	United States	Crofoot
October 10, 2012	Seoul	South Korea	V-Hall
October 18, 2012	Paris	France	Trabendo
October 19, 2012	Zürich	Switzerland	Mascotte
October 21, 2012	Munich	Germany	Hansa 39
October 22, 2012	Frankfurt	Germany	Batschkapp
October 23, 2012	Hamburg	Germany	Knust
October 25, 2012	London	United Kingdom	Heaven
October 26, 2012	Birmingham	United Kingdom	Library
October 27, 2012	Dublin	Ireland	Whelan's
October 28, 2012	Glasgow	United Kingdom	Garage
October 30, 2012	Manchester	United Kingdom	Academy 3
October 31, 2012	Oxford	United Kingdom	Academy 1
November 2, 2012	Gent	Belgium	Vooruit
November 3, 2012	Amsterdam	Netherlands	Melkweg
November 7, 2012	Osaka	Japan	Big Cat
November 8, 2012	Tokyo	Japan	Shibuya AX
November 10, 2012	Seoul	South Korea	V Hall
November 12, 2012	Taipei	Taiwan	Legacy Taipei
November 14, 2012	Jakarta	Indonesia	Tennis Indoor Senayan
November 16, 2012	Auckland	New Zealand	Powerstation
November 18, 2012	Melbourne	Australia	Corner Hotel (Early Show)
November 18, 2012	Melbourne	Australia	Corner Hotel (Late Show)
November 20, 2012	Sydney	Australia	The Metro Theatre
December 3, 2012	Los Angeles	United States	KISSFM Jingle Ball @ Nokia Theatre
December 4, 2012	Saint Paul	United States	KDWB Jingle Ball @ Xcel Energy Center
December 10, 2012	Buffalo	United States	WKSE Kissmas Bash @ First Niagara Center
December 12, 2012	Atlanta	United States	WWPW Jingle Ball @ Philips Arena
December 14, 2012	San Jose	United States	KMVQ Triple Ho Show @ Event Center at SJSU
December 15, 2012	Los Angeles	United States	L.A. Live (Free Show)
December 16, 2012	Seattle	United States	KBKS Jingle Ball @ WaMu Theater

== 2013 tours ==
Date	City	Country	Venue
North America
February 10, 2013 (Note: Solo engagement)	Urbana	United States	The Canopy
February 11, 2013	Lansing	United States	The Loft
February 13, 2013 (Note: With American pop rock band Maroon 5 and American rock band Neon Trees)	Columbus	United States	Schottenstein Center
February 14, 2013	Auburn Hills	United States	The Palace of Auburn Hills
February 16, 2013 (Note: With Maroon 5 and Neon Trees only, Owl City unable to perform due to singer Adam Young being ill.)	New York City	United States	Madison Square Garden
February 17, 2013	Manchester	United States	Verizon Wireless Arena
February 19, 2013	Toronto	Canada	Air Canada Centre
February 20, 2013	Montreal	Canada	Bell Centre
February 22, 2013	Uncasville	United States	Mohegan Sun Arena
February 23, 2013	East Rutherford	United States	Izod Center
February 24, 2013	Cleveland	United States	House of Blues
February 25, 2013	Grand Rapids	United States	Van Andel Arena
February 27, 2013	Kansas City	United States	Sprint Center
February 28, 2013	Milwaukee	United States	The Rave
March 1, 2013	Moline	United States	iWireless Center
March 3, 2013	Omaha	United States	CenturyLink Center Omaha
March 4, 2013	Saint Paul	United States	Xcel Energy Center
March 7, 2013	Calgary	Canada	Scotiabank Saddledome
March 9, 2013	Vancouver	Canada	Rogers Arena
March 11, 2013	Seattle	United States	KeyArena
March 10, 2013	Spokane	United States	Knitting Factory
March 13, 2013	San Jose	United States	HP Pavilion
March 15, 2013	Los Angeles	United States	Staples Center
March 16, 2013	Las Vegas	United States	Mandalay Bay Arena
March 17, 2013	Phoenix	United States	Crescent Ballroom
March 19, 2013	Houston	United States	Toyota Center
March 21, 2013	Dallas	United States	American Airlines Center
March 22, 2013	Tulsa	United States	BOK Center
March 23, 2013	St. Louis	United States	The Pageant
March 24, 2013	Nashville	United States	Bridgestone Arena
March 26, 2013	Birmingham	United States	BJCC Arena
March 27, 2013	Atlanta	United States	Philips Arena
March 29, 2013	Fort Lauderdale	United States	BB&T Center
March 30, 2013	Orlando	United States	Amway Center
April 1, 2013	Jacksonville	United States	Veterans Memorial Arena
April 3, 2013	Washington, D.C.	United States	Verizon Arena
April 4, 2013	Philadelphia	United States	Wells Fargo Center
April 5, 2013	Pittsburgh	United States	Altar Bar
April 6, 2013	Rosemont	United States	Allstate Arena
April 14, 2013 (Note: With Neon Trees alone)	Cincinnati	United States	Xavier University
May 3, 2013	Akron	United States	University of Akron
May 4, 2013	Greenville	United States	Agape Fest
May 15, 2013	St. Louis	United States	Yahoo! On The Road Tour
June 12, 2013	Atlanta	United States	Pop Tarts Crazy Good Summer Concert @ The Tabernacle
August 9, 2013	Des Moines	United States	Simon Estes Amphitheater
August 10, 2013	Joliet	United States	Mojoes
August 11, 2013	Grand Rapids	United States	Meijer Gardens
August 12, 2013	London	Canada	London Music Hall
August 14, 2013	Saint-Jean-sur-Richelieu	Canada	Festival International de Montgolfières
August 15, 2013	Ottawa	Canada	Algonquin Commons Theatre
August 16, 2013	Buffalo	United States	Town Ballroom
Asia
August 20, 2013	Shanghai	China	The Mixing Room
August 21, 2013	Beijing	China	M-Space at the MasterCard Center
August 22, 2013	Hong Kong	China	KITEC Rotunda 2
August 24, 2013	Bangkok	Thailand	Synopsis Bangkok Music Festival
North America
August 28, 2013	Lancaster	United States	Chameleon Club
August 29, 2013	Atlantic City	United States	House of Blues
August 30, 2013	Syracuse	United States	New York State Fair
August 31, 2013	Deer Park	United States	Tanger Outlets at the Arches
September 1, 2013	Salisbury	United States	Blue Ocean Music Hall
Asia
September 23, 2013	Singapore	Singapore	2013 Formula 1 Singtel Singapore Grand Prix
South America
November 8, 2013	Córdoba	Argentina	Z Festival – Córdoba @ Mario Kempes Stadium
November 9, 2013	Buenos Aires	Argentina	Z Festival – Buenos Aires @ River Plate Stadium
November 10, 2013	Buenos Aires	Argentina	River Plate Stadium
November 12, 2013	Santiago	Chile	Estadio Nacional

== 2014 tours ==
Date	City	Country	Venue
Japan
July 12, 2014	Yokohama	Japan	Nano Mugen Festival 2014; Yokohama Arena
July 13, 2014	Yokohama	Japan	Nano Mugen Festival 2014; Yokohama Arena
October 4, 2014 (Note: Adam is supporting Japanese rock band Sekai no Owari. It was canceled due to a typhoon on October 6, 2014.)	Fujiyoshida	Japan	TOKYO FANTASY; Fuji-Q Highland
October 5, 2014	Fujiyoshida	Japan	TOKYO FANTASY; Fuji-Q Highland
October 6, 2014	Fujiyoshida	Japan	TOKYO FANTASY; Fuji-Q Highland

== 2015 tours ==
Date	City	Country	Venue
Asian Tour
May 8, 2015	Manila	Philippines	Bonifacio High Street Amphitheater @ BGC
May 10, 2015	Denpasar	Indonesia	Sky Garden
May 11, 2015	Jakarta	Indonesia	Rolling Stone
May 14, 2015	Beijing	China	The Huiyuan-Space
May 16, 2015	Shanghai	China	The Mixing Room
May 17, 2015	Shanghai	China	The Mixing Room
May 19, 2015	Guangzhou	China	Sun Yat-Sen's Memorial Hall
May 21, 2015	Singapore	Singapore	The Coliseum @ Hard Rock Hotel Singapore
May 23, 2015	Seoul	The Republic of Korea	Seoul Jazz Festival
May 26, 2015	Osaka	Japan	Big Cat
May 27, 2015	Nagoya	Japan	Bottom Line
May 28, 2015	Tokyo	Japan	Zepp Divercity Tokyo
July 24, 2015	Niigata	Japan	Fuji Rock Festival 2015
On the Verge US Tour
October 5, 2015	Nashville	United States	The Cannery Ballroom
October 6, 2015	Atlanta	United States	Center Stage
October 8, 2015	Philadelphia	United States	The Trocadero Theatre
October 9, 2015	Washington, D.C.	United States	9:30 Club
October 10, 2015	New York City	United States	Irving Plaza
October 12, 2015	Boston	United States	Paradise Rock Club
October 13, 2015	Lancaster	United States	Chameleon Club
October 15, 2015	Chicago	United States	House of Blues
October 16, 2015	Milwaukee	United States	The Rave II
October 17, 2015	Minneapolis	United States	Varsity Theater
October 19, 2015	Englewood	United States	Gothic Theatre
October 20, 2015	Salt Lake City	United States	The Complex
October 22, 2015	Seattle	United States	Neptune Theatre
October 24, 2015	San Francisco	United States	The Regency Ballroom
October 25, 2015	San Diego	United States	Observatory North Park
October 26, 2015	Anaheim	United States	House of Blues (w/ Rozzi Crane)

== 2018 tours ==
Date	City	Country	Venue
Cinematic North American Tour
September 13, 2018	Milwaukee	United States	The Rave/Eagles Club
September 14, 2018	Pontiac	United States	The Crofoot Ballroom
September 15, 2018	Toronto	Canada	Phoenix Concert Theatre
September 17, 2018	Philadelphia	United States	Theater of the Living Arts
September 18, 2018	Lancaster	United States	Chameleon Club
September 19, 2018	New York City	United States	Irving Plaza
September 21, 2018	Boston	United States	Paradise Rock Club
September 22, 2018	Washington, D.C.	United States	9:30 Club
September 23, 2018	Charlotte	United States	The Underground
September 25, 2018	Atlanta	United States	Center Stage Theater
September 26, 2018	Orlando	United States	The Plaza Live
September 28, 2018	Dallas	United States	House of Blues – Dallas
September 29, 2018	Houston	United States	House of Blues – Houston
October 1, 2018	Phoenix	United States	Crescent Ballroom
October 2, 2018	Anaheim	United States	House of Blues – Anaheim
October 3, 2018	San Francisco	United States	The Regency Ballroom
October 5, 2018	Portland	United States	Hawthorne Theatre
October 6, 2018	Seattle	United States	Neptune Theatre
October 8, 2018	Boise	United States	Egyptian Theatre
October 9, 2018	Salt Lake City	United States	The Complex
October 10, 2018	Denver	United States	Bluebird Theatre
October 12, 2018	Minneapolis	United States	First Avenue
October 13, 2018	Chicago	United States	House of Blues – Chicago
October 14, 2018	Columbus	United States	EXPRESS LIVE!
Asian Tour
November 7, 2018	Tokyo	Japan	Ex Theatre
November 8, 2018	Nagoya-shi	Japan	Bottom Line
November 9, 2018	Higashi-osaka	Japan	BIGCAT
November 11, 2018	Yongsangu	South Korea	Blue Square IMarket Hall
November 14, 2018	Beijing	China	M Space
November 18, 2018	Chengdu	China	Normalizing Arts Center Hall 1
November 20, 2018	Pudong Xinqu	China	The Mixing Room & Muse
November 21, 2018	Pudong Xinqu	China	The Mixing Room & Muse
November 23, 2018	Nanjing	China	Nanjing-Taoxiang Music Space
November 24, 2018	Guangzhao	China	Rock House

== 2023–2024 tours ==
Date	City	Country	Venue
To the Moon Tour
September 12, 2023	Detroit	United States	Saint Andrew's Hall
September 13, 2023	Columbus	United States	Newport Music Hall
September 15, 2023	New York City	United States	Webster Hall
September 16, 2023	Washington D.C.	United States	9:30 Club
September 17, 2023	Boston	United States	House of Blues Boston (Note: The show on September 17, 2023 was originally at Paradise Rock Club.)
September 19, 2023	Charlotte	United States	The Underground
September 20, 2023	Atlanta	United States	Buckhead Theatre
September 22, 2023	Louisville	United States	Mercury Ballroom
September 23, 2023	Indianapolis	United States	Deluxe at Old National Centre
September 24, 2023	Kansas City	United States	The Truman
September 26, 2023	Denver	United States	Ogden Theatre
September 27, 2023	Salt Lake City	United States	The Union Event Center
September 29, 2023	Portland	United States	McMenamins Crystal Ballroom
September 30, 2023	Seattle	United States	Moore Theater (Note: The show on September 30, 2023 was originally at Neptune Theater.)
October 2, 2023	Sacramento	United States	Ace of Spades
October 3, 2023	San Francisco	United States	The Midway
October 4, 2023	Anaheim	United States	House of Blues Anaheim
October 6, 2023	Las Vegas	United States	Brooklyn Bowl Las Vegas
October 7, 2023	San Diego	United States	House of Blues San Diego
October 8, 2023	Phoenix	United States	The Van Buren
October 10, 2023	Dallas	United States	House of Blues Dallas (Note: The show on October 10, 2023 was originally at The Echo Lounge & Music Hall.)
October 11, 2023	Houston	United States	House of Blues Houston
October 13, 2023	Tulsa	United States	Cain's Ballroom
October 14, 2023	St. Louis	United States	Delmar Hall
October 15, 2023	Nashville	United States	Brooklyn Bowl Nashville
October 17, 2023	Grand Rapids	United States	The Intersection
October 18, 2023	Chicago	United States	House of Blues Chicago
October 20, 2023	Milwaukee	United States	The Rave / Eagles Club
October 21, 2023	Minneapolis	United States	Uptown Theatre
November 2, 2023	Blacksburg	United States	Lyric Theatre
February 5, 2024	Tokyo	Japan	Zepp Shinjuku
February 6, 2024	Nagoya	Japan	Club Quattro
February 7, 2024	Osaka	Japan	Bigcat
To the Moon Deluxe Tour
March 21, 2024	Raleigh, NC	United States	The Ritz
March 22, 2024	Washington, DC	United States	Georgetown University – McDonough Memorial Gymnasium
March 23, 2024	Norfolk, VA	United States	The NorVa
April 2, 2024	Chattanooga, TN	United States	The Signal
April 3, 2024	Birmingham, AL	United States	Iron City
April 5, 2024	Ponte Vedra Beach, FL	United States	Ponte Vedra Concert Hall
April 6, 2024	Tampa, FL	United States	Busch Gardens
April 7, 2024	Orlando, FL	United States	Bayside Stadium
April 9, 2024	Asheville, NC	United States	The Orange Peel
April 10, 2024	Lexington, KY	United States	Manchester Music Hall
April 12, 2024	Cincinnati, OH	United States	Bogart's
April 13, 2024	Pittsburgh, PA	United States	Roxian Theatre
April 14, 2024	Cleveland, OH	United States	House of Blues
