= Augustana (album) =

Studio album by Augustana
- Released: April 26, 2011
- Studio: The Lair (Los Angeles); The Gecko Chamber (Los Angeles); Phantom Vox (Los Angeles); The Enemy Dojo (Calabasas)
- Genre: Rock; pop rock; roots rock; indie rock
- Length: 37:38
- Label: Epic
- Producer: Julian Bunetta; Sam Farrar; Jacquire King; Jeff Trott

Augustana chronology
Can't Love, Can't Hurt (2008)	Augustana (2011)	Life Imitating Life (2014)

Professional ratings
Aggregate scores
Source	Rating
Metacritic	60/100
Review scores
Source	Rating
Allmusic	4/5 stars
Alternative Addiction	4.5/5 stars
BLARE Magazine	3/5 stars
IGN Music	4/5 stars

Augustana is the third studio album by the American rock band Augustana, released on April 26, 2011 on Epic Records.

The album's lead single, "Steal Your Heart", was planned for a radio release on February 14 in order to coincide with Valentine's Day, but was released early on February 8 via AOL Music. American Songwriter's review states the album "is full of strong, if not extraordinary material, which is sure to leave an indelible impression."

== Track listing ==
Augustana track listing
No.	Title	Writer(s)	Producer(s)	Length
1.	"Steal Your Heart"	Daniel Layus; Sam Farrar; John Fredericks; Chris Sachtleben	Farrar	3:33
2.	"Wrong Side of Love"	Layus	Jacquire King	3:32
3.	"On the Other Side"	Layus; Evan Bogart	Julian Bunetta	4:17
4.	"Counting Stars"	Layus; Kevin Griffin; Bunetta	Bunetta	4:17
5.	"Borrowed Time"	Layus; Jeff Trott	Trott	3:09
6.	"Shot in the Dark"	Layus; Sachtleben; Bunetta; Fredericks	Bunetta	3:26
7.	"Someone's Baby Now"	Layus	King	3:17
8.	"Hurricane"	Layus; Fredericks	King	5:20
9.	"Just Stay Here Tonight"	Layus	King	3:20
10.	"You Were Made for Me (It Only Means I Love You)"	Layus	King	3:27
Total length:				37:38

iTunes bonus tracks
No.	Title	Writer(s)	Producer(s)	Length
11.	"Hearts Wander"	Layus	King	3:00
12.	"Last Mistake"	Layus; Fredericks	King	3:47
Total length:				44:25

== Personnel ==
Credits adapted from the album's liner notes and Apple Music.

=== Augustana ===
- Daniel Layus – vocals (all tracks); acoustic guitar, background vocals (track 5)
- Chris Sachtleben – guitar
- Jared Palomar – bass guitar
- Justin South – drums

=== Additional contributors ===
- John Fredericks – keyboards
- Adam Ayan – mastering
- Jon Kaplan – mixing (1, 3, 4, 6)
- Andy Marcinkowski – mixing assistance, editing (1, 3, 4, 6)
- Noah Passovoy – engineering (1)
- Jacquire King – mixing, engineering (2, 7–10, 12)
- Jon Stinson – mixing assistance (2, 7–10, 12)
- Brad Bivens – engineering (2, 7–10, 12)
- BB Vaughn – engineering assistance (2, 7–10, 12)
- Andy Breihan – band and production assistance (2, 7–10, 12)
- Jeff Trott – lap steel guitar, mandolin, bass guitar, mixing, engineering (5)
- Victor Indrizzo – drums (5)
- Bob Salcedo – additional engineering (5)
- Beau Grealy – photography
- Storey Elementary – design
