= Crowded Table =

2019 single by The Highwomen

Single by The Highwomen

from the album The Highwomen
- Released: July 26, 2019
- Studio: RCA Studio A in Nashville
- Genre: Americana; Country
- Length: 3:29
- Label: Low Country Sound; Elektra
- Songwriters: Brandi Carlile; Natalie Hemby; Lori McKenna
- Producer: Dave Cobb

The Highwomen singles chronology
"Redesigning Women" (2019)	"Crowded Table" (2019)	"Highwomen" (2019)

"Crowded Table" is a song recorded by American country music supergroup The Highwomen. It was co-written by group members Brandi Carlile and Natalie Hemby, and singer-songwriter Lori McKenna. Produced by Dave Cobb, the song was released July 26, 2019 as the second single off The Highwomen, the group's debut album. Following by one week the release of the single "Redesigning Women", the song continues the album's theme, calling for community and inclusivity in both country music and society. The song received widespread critical acclaim, winning both the Grammy Award for Best Country Song and the Americana Music Association Song of the Year award for 2020.

== Writing and production ==
Natalie Hemby began writing the song before becoming a member of The Highwomen. As related by Lori McKenna on an episode of the CMT "I Wrote That!" series of interviews, The Highwomen original lineup consisting of Amanda Shires, Carlile, and Maren Morris recruited McKenna and Hemby to contribute songs for their debut album. McKenna visited Hemby at her home and after Hemby said "I have this title, 'Crowded Table'. You know, like I want a house 'with a crowded table'", the two started an emotion-filled songwriting session, with McKenna saying in the interview that they "just kind of poured our hearts into it."

Following the writing session, Hemby took the song to the studio where Dave Cobb and the band were working on the album. The other members of the group at that time surprised her with an invitation to join The Highwomen, which Hemby accepted. McKenna says after that, Carlile added further to the song: "The chorus really opened up and became more, sort of more worldly and more universal once Brandi put her spin on it."

The song was recorded live with four-part harmonies and its theme is community and inclusiveness. Regarding the song's lyric "I want a house with a crowded table / And a place by the fire for everyone", Carlile explained in an interview for the Country Music Association: "I think that the table and the fire being a metaphor for bringing people together that don’t all think the same thing. We don’t all believe the same things even in The Highwomen. But the fact that we can come to the table, that we can break bread and then we can go out into the world as activists and as women, but we come home to each other at the end of the day, that’s what families do. I think that’s a really beautiful sentiment everybody needs to hear right now.”

The production studio used by The Highwomen is RCA Studio A, where several important country albums were recorded in the 1960s and 70s, and is operated by Dave Cobb. The video released for "Crowded Table" was filmed in the studio, and along with The Highwomen singing the song, also features scenes with other artists who appear on the album, including Sheryl Crow, Jason Isbell, Yola, and Phil and Tim Hanseroth.

== Critical reception ==
Among the positive reviews "Crowded Table" received, Alex Suskind of Entertainment Weekly, which ranked the song fourth best of 2019, wrote: "This powerful, singalong-ready single from the country supergroup dreams of a shared tomorrow — one where women of all stripes can sit down together and have a conversation, despite their differences. 'Let us take on the world while we're young and able/ And bring us back together when the day is done,' the quartet sings on a hook that feels both timely and timeless." Spencer Kornhaber wrote in The Atlantic, "The label of 'supergroup' is always fraught—such groups rarely turn out to be all that super—but here it’s shored up by the way the form of the band aligns with its mission. On “Crowded Table,” the women conjure a grand, sprawling feeling as they imagine a house where “everyone’s a little broken / And everyone belongs.” In an outline of The Highwomen, The New York Times wrote of how the band sought to bring women into equality in male-dominated country music, noting with "Crowded Table", "the band sings in unison, a folksy but effective translation of the kind of inclusiveness they’re fighting for."

== Accolades ==
Year	Association	Category	Result
2020	CMT Music Awards	Group Video of the Year	Nominated
2020	Americana Music Honors & Awards	Song of the Year	Won
2021	Grammy Awards	Best Country Song	Won

== Live performances ==
The Highwomen debuted "Crowded Table" live at the 2019 Newport Folk Festival.

== Charts ==
Chart (2020)	Peak position
Billboard US AAA	31
