= Sweet and Low (Augustana song) =

Single by Augustana

from the album Can't Love, Can't Hurt
- Released: March 4, 2008
- Recorded: 2007–2008
- Studio: The Pass Studios (Los Angeles)
- Genre: Alternative rock; pop rock
- Length: 3:34
- Label: Epic
- Songwriters: Dan Layus; Mike Flynn
- Producers: Mike Flynn; Warren Huart

Augustana singles chronology
"Boston" (2005)	"Sweet and Low" (2008)	"I Still Ain't Over You" (2009)

Music video
- "Sweet and Low" on YouTube

"Sweet and Low" is a song by rock band Augustana. It was released on March 4, 2008, as the first single from their second studio album Can't Love, Can't Hurt. The song peaked at No. 88 on the Billboard Hot 100. It also reached No. 33 on the U.S. Adult Top 40 and No. 4 on the U.S. Adult Alternative Airplay charts.

The song was used in an episode of Kyle XY, which further gained attraction in late 2009 and early 2010. As of October 2021, the official music video on YouTube has over 1.4 million views. The video was posted on April 1, 2008.

== Critical reception ==
David Wiegand of SFGate called the track "the album's standout number." Craig Manning of Chorus.fm described it as "as a radio-friendly first single until it hits its big, urgent bridge."

== Music video ==
The music video for "Sweet and Low" premiered via MTV on April 1, 2008, directed by JW James and Scott Duncan. It later premiered on VEVO on August 25, 2010.

== Track listing ==
CD single
No.	Title	Length
1.	"Sweet and Low"	3:34

Digital download
No.	Title	Length
1.	"Sweet and Low" (Live at Sweetwater Studios)	3:07

== Charts ==
Chart performance for "Sweet and Low"
Chart (2008)	Peak position
US Billboard Hot 100	88
US Adult Alternative Airplay (Billboard)	4
US Adult Pop Airplay (Billboard)	33
US Pop 100 (Billboard)	66

== Release history ==
Release history and formats for "Sweet and Low"
Region	Date	Format	Label	Ref.
Various	March 4, 2008	Digital download	Sony Music Entertainment	
