= Boston (Augustana song) =

2006 song by Augustana

Single by Augustana

from the album All the Stars and Boulevards
- Released: January 17, 2006
- Studio: The Apple Store, Los Angeles, California
- Genre: Pop rock
- Length: 4:06
- Label: Epic
- Songwriters: Dan Layus, Jared Palomar, Justin South, Josiah Rosen
- Producers: Brendan O'Brien, Jon King

Augustana singles chronology
"Stars and Boulevards" (2005)	"Boston" (2006)	"Sweet and Low" (2008)

"Boston" is a song by American rock band Augustana, from their debut album All the Stars and Boulevards (2005). The song was released as the second single on January 17, 2006. It was originally produced in 2003 by Jon King for their demo, Midwest Skies and Sleepless Mondays, and was later re-recorded with producer Brendan O'Brien for All the Stars and Boulevards.

== Background and release ==
In May 2005, the band announced the release date for their debut studio album, All the Stars and Boulevards, as well as releasing "Boston" for download on their website along with two other tracks. The song was released as the second single in 2006 and soon gained radio airplay.

== Composition ==
The sheet music for "Boston" is published in the key of C major, and is set in time signature of common time with a tempo of 147 beats per minute. Dan Layus's vocal range spans from A_{3} to G_{5}.

Augustana bassist Jared Palomar has stated that the song is loosely based on one of Layus' high school classmates who left to attend Duke University. Palomar said, "It's more the idea of getting away from everything and starting over." Asked about the meaning of "Boston" in the song, Layus replied: "You know, growing up, I had extended family on the outskirts of Boston, and we’d fly out there for the holidays fairly often, and I always loved it out there, in my mind it always seemed like the farthest point away from California that you could go.... I must have been tapping into that when I was writing that song 'Boston' ...."

== Music video ==
The music video for "Boston" was released on February 6, 2006, and was directed by Paul Fedor. It starts with lead singer Dan Layus playing a piano on a beach's shoreline at low tide initially, later showing numerous other abandoned pianos standing still on the shoreline. As the video progresses, other band members appear. Soon after, high tide comes up and the entire band continues to play as they are submerged in water over and over. Band members have been shown to be struggling to keep up with their musical instruments, but they do not seem to give up playing even in such adverse conditions. Some of the abandoned pianos are now partially underwater, tipped over, and/or partially sunken to the sand while seagulls flock on them. The video ends with the camera viewing the sea, but focused on a buoy. The video was filmed in California at Zuma Beach.

== Use in popular media ==
"Boston" was used in the third-season finale of One Tree Hill, "The Show Must Go On", when Brooke Davis and Lucas Scott have their last dance as a couple. Nathan and Haley drive away to their honeymoon meanwhile Lucas confesses to Peyton that he told Brooke about their kiss in the library. It was also featured in Scrubs, 19th episode of the fifth season, "His Story 3", in The Big Bang Theory, 3rd episode of the first season ("The Fuzzy Boots Corollary"), in "Here Comes the Judge", the 15th episode of season one of Shark, and in the season finale of the first season of Boston's Finest. It's also heard in the film A Warrior's Heart.

== Track listing ==
Digital download
No.	Title	Length
1.	"Boston"	4:05
2.	"Boston" (music video)	4:03

CD single
No.	Title	Length
1.	"Boston" (album version)	4:07
2.	"Boston" (Live From The Grove)	4:13
3.	"Mayfield" (live)	6:51
4.	"Ringtone"
Total length:		14:40

== Charts ==
=== Weekly charts ===
Weekly chart performance for "Boston"
Chart (2006–2007)	Peak position
Canada Hot 100 (Billboard)	82
Canada CHR/Top 40 (Billboard)	47
Canada Hot AC (Billboard)	45
US Billboard Hot 100	34
US Adult Alternative Airplay (Billboard)	9
US Adult Pop Airplay (Billboard)	10
US Pop Airplay (Billboard)	24

=== Year-end charts ===
Year-end chart performance for "Boston"
Chart (2007)	Peak position
US Digital Song Sales (Billboard)	67
US Hot Adult Contemporary (Radio & Records)	47

== Release history ==
Release history and formats for "Boston"
Region	Date	Format	Label	Ref.
United States	January 17, 2006	Contemporary hit radio	Epic	
Various	August 8, 2006	Digital download	Sony Music Entertainment	
United States	October 23, 2007	CD	Epic	

== Owl City version ==
"Boston"

Single by Owl City

from the album Coco Moon
- Released: February 9, 2024
- Genre: Synth-pop; punk rock
- Length: 4:04
- Label: Sky Harbor
- Songwriter: Dan Layus
- Producer: Adam Young

Owl City singles chronology
"Vitamin Sea" (2023)	"Boston" (2024)	"Car Trouble" (2024)

American electronica project Owl City released a cover of the song on February 9, 2024, from the deluxe edition of his seventh studio album, Coco Moon.

=== Background ===
On January 25, 2024, Young teased a cover of "Boston" via Instagram. It was officially released on February 9, and was produced by Young.

=== Critical reception ===
Peter Källman of Music Talkers gave a positive review of the track. He stated, "The song 'Boston' sort of starts in a 'classic' Owl City fashion, from what I can remember, with the cute synths modified to perfection and an overall bubbly feeling [...] We introduce distorted guitars, rebellious pop-punk vocals, and much more. I would say this switch-up makes sense, and it is appreciated that someone put so much thought into their song." He described the first half of the song as "modern and in line with the Owl City sound." He also noted how the punk rock elements becomes "nostalgic."

=== Release history ===
Release history and formats for "Boston"
Region	Date	Format	Label	Ref.
Various	February 9, 2024	Digital download	Sky Harbor	
United Kingdom	February 9, 2024	Contemporary hit radio	Sky Harbor	

== See also ==
- Don't Know What You Got (Till It's Gone) by Cinderella - A song whose music video also features a piano being played next to water.
