= Life Imitating Life =

Studio album by Augustana
- Released: April 22, 2014
- Recorded: March–September 2013, Rhinebeck, NY and Nashville, TN.
- Genre: Rock, pop rock, indie rock, roots rock
- Length: 43:19
- Label: Razor & Tie
- Producer: John O’Mahony

Augustana chronology
Augustana (2011)	Life Imitating Life (2014)

Singles from Life Imitating Life
- 1. "Ash and Ember" Released: March 4, 2014

Life Imitating Life is the fourth studio album by the American rock band Augustana, released on April 22, 2014 via Razor & Tie. The album features Sarab Singh on drums, all other instruments were recorded by Dan Layus.

== Track listing ==
All tracks are written by Daniel Layus.

No.	Title	Length
1.	"Ash and Ember"	3:56
2.	"Need a Little Sunshine"	3:47
3.	"Love in the Air"	4:08
4.	"Youth is Wasted on the Young"	3:28
5.	"Say You Want Me"	3:53
6.	"Fit Together"	4:15
7.	"According to Plan"	3:53
8.	"I Really Think So"	3:16
9.	"Alive"	3:36
10.	"Remember Me"	3:52

Deluxe edition bonus tracks
No.	Title	Length
11.	"Long Way to Go"	3:15
12.	"American Heartbreak"	4:00
