= Can't Love, Can't Hurt =

2008 album by Augustana

Studio album by Augustana
- Released: April 29, 2008
- Genres: Rock, roots rock, indie rock
- Length: 40:38
- Label: Epic
- Producers: Mike Flynn and Warren Huart

Augustana chronology
Can't Love, Can't Hurt EP (2008)	Can't Love, Can't Hurt (2008)	Augustana (2011)

Professional ratings
Review scores
Source	Rating
AbsolutePunk.net	(87%)
The Album Project	4/5 stars
Allmusic	3.5/5 stars
Billboard	
Patrol Magazine	(6.0/10)
PopMatters	(3/10)

Can't Love, Can't Hurt is the second album by Augustana, a California rock band. The album was released on April 29, 2008, by Epic Records. The album debuted at number 21 on the U.S. Billboard 200 chart, selling over 21,000 copies in its first week.

An iTunes exclusive EP was released on February 26, 2008 to promote the album featuring the first three tracks from the album.

== Track listing ==
All songs written by Dan Layus and Mike Flynn.

=== Regular edition ===
1. "Hey Now" – 4:39
2. "I Still Ain't Over You" – 3:31
3. "Sweet and Low" – 3:34
4. "Twenty Years" – 4:27
5. "Meet You There" – 3:14
6. "Fire" – 2:31
7. "Either Way, I'll Break Your Heart Someday" – 4:11
8. "Dust" – 5:04
9. "Rest, Shame, Love" – 3:59
10. "Where Love Went Wrong" – 5:31
11. "I'll Stay"^{†} – 3:38
12. "Sweet and Low" (acoustic)^{†} – 3:21
13. "Sweet and Low" (music video)^{†} – 3:32
14. "Hey Now" (acoustic music video)^{†} – 4:14
15. "Reasons"^{†} – 3:29

^{†} Deluxe edition bonus tracks.

== Personnel ==
=== Musicians ===
- Dan Layus – vocals, guitars, piano
- Jared Palomar – bass guitar, vocals
- Justin South – drums, percussion, vocals
- Chris Sachtleben - guitars, mandolin, vocals
- John Fredericks – piano, keyboards, guitars, vocals
- David Lamoureux - keyboards, percussion

=== Production ===
- Produced by Mike Flynn
- Co-Produced and Engineered by Warren Huart
- Strings arranged & conducted by David Campbell
- Recorded at The Pass Studios in Los Angeles, CA
- Assisted by Zeph Sowers and Bo Joe
- Mixed by Jim Scott at PLYRZ Studios, Assisted by Kevin Dean

Can't Love, Can't Hurt EP

EP by Augustana
- Released: 2008
- Genres: Rock, roots rock, indie rock
- Length: 11:07
- Label: Epic

== EP track listing ==
1. "Sweet and Low"
2. "Hey Now"
3. "I Still Ain't Over You"
