= Maggie Chapman (singer) =

American singer-songwriter (born 1997)

- Born: April 23, 1997 (age 28); Clearwater, Florida, United States
- Genres: Pop
- Occupations: Singer; songwriter
- Instrument(s): Vocals, guitar, piano
- Years active: 2013–present
- Website: Maggiechapmanmusic.com

Maggie Chapman is an American singer-songwriter who currently resides in Nashville, Tennessee. She released her debut album, Vignette, in September 2014.

== Career ==
Chapman signed with Creative Nation in 2013. Her debut EP, Maggie Chapman, was released in February 2014. The EP was featured on Rolling Stone magazine and USA Today with both Teen Vogue and Kings of A&R noting her as a new artist to watch. She released her first full-length album, Vignette, on September 16, 2014. Esquire, Idolator, Just Jared Jr. Maggie co-wrote all ten tracks on the album, which was produced by Luke Laird.

== Discography ==
=== Studio albums ===
Title	Album details
Vignette	Released: September 16, 2014; Format: CD, digital download

=== Extended plays ===
Title	EP details
Maggie Chapman	Released: February 17, 2014

=== Singles ===
Single	Release date
"Could've Been Summer"	November 26, 2013
"Back in Love" (Landon Austin & Maggie Chapman)	April 28, 2014
"Make It Rain, Dear"	November 28, 2014
