= Augustana (band) =

American rock band

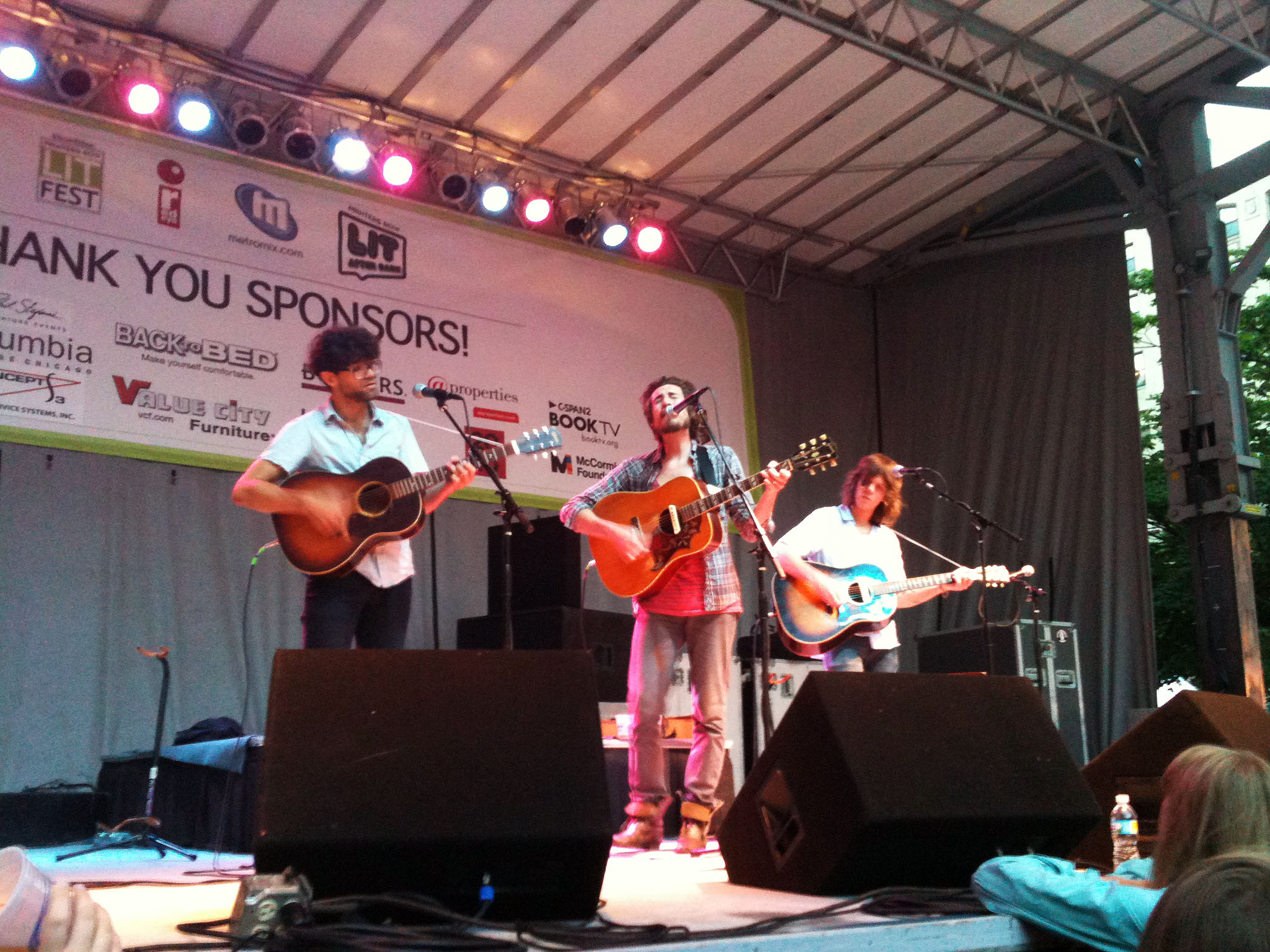
- Augustana, Chicago 2010

Background information
- Origin: Santa Ana, California, U.S.
- Genres: Rock; indie rock; roots rock
- Years active: 2002–2011; 2012–present
- Labels: Epic; Razor & Tie; Washington Square
- Members: Daniel Layus; Chris Sachtleben; Jared Palomar
- Past members: Justin South; John Vincent; Josiah Rosen; Simeon Lohrmann; Josh Calhoun; Kyle Baker
- Website: www.augustanamusic.com

Augustana is an American rock band based in San Diego, California and it was formed in 2002 in southern Illinois. The band currently consists of Daniel Layus (lead vocals, guitar, piano), Chris Sachtleben (guitar, backing vocals), and Jared Palomar (bass guitar, keyboards, backing vocals). The band have released six studio albums and six EPs while being signed to Epic Records and Razor & Tie. They are best known for their song "Boston" and the album All the Stars and Boulevards.

== History ==
=== Early years (2002–2004) ===
Lead vocalist and keyboardist Daniel Layus and guitarist Josiah Rosen were studying contemporary Christian music at Greenville University when Augustana formed in Autumn 2002 in Illinois. Layus brought Rosen and friends Kyle Baker and Simeon Lohrmann together to write and create music. The album was released in the Spring of 2003 and only 1000 copies were produced, however, early buzz and reviews were primarily positive. Later that year the band recorded and released 25 copies of the Mayfield EP.

Dan Layus decided to move back to Southern California with bandmate Josiah Rosen, where they eventually found their drummer, Justin South. The band joined numerous tours with artists such as Switchfoot, Maroon 5, The Fray, Counting Crows, Dashboard Confessional, O.A.R., Snow Patrol, The Damnwells, Goo Goo Dolls, Acceptance, Cartel, and OneRepublic, as well as having their own headlining tours.

=== All the Stars and Boulevards (2005–2007) ===
All the Stars and Boulevards was released September 6, 2005, and reached #1 on the Billboard Top Heatseekers chart and #96 on the Billboard Top 200 chart. The first single from the album, "Boston", was released in 2005. This version differs from the one on their debut album, Midwest Skies and Sleepless Mondays. The album was made available exclusively at Best Buy stores, and the Best Buy website, where it was sold out by the following day. The new features on this re-release are a re-mixed version of "Wasteland"; a new track named "Marie"; and acoustic versions and music videos of "Boston" and "Stars and Boulevards". Their most recognizable song is "Boston" which made it all the way to 34 on the Billboard top 100, as well as appearing on television shows Scrubs, Smallville, Hidden Palms, and One Tree Hill. On January 3, 2007, they performed it when they appeared as the musical guest on the Late Show with David Letterman (S14.E71). Leonard Hofstadter is heard singing it in the third episode of Season 1 of The Big Bang Theory. Josiah Rosen left the band soon after. At the beginning of 2007, the band embarked on their second headlining tour, supported by Vega4. The band also opened for Chris Carrabba of Dashboard Confessional in late 2007.

=== Can't Love, Can't Hurt (2008–2010) ===
The band released their third album, Can't Love, Can't Hurt, on April 29, 2008. The first single from the album is titled "Sweet and Low". The second single, "I Still Ain't Over You" reached #22 on the Adult album alternative chart. On May 1, 2008, the band appeared on The Tonight Show with Jay Leno. Following personnel problems, the band had to cancel their European/North American tour for fall 2010.

=== Augustana (2011–2013) ===
Augustana's self-titled, fourth full-length album was released on April 26, 2011. The album's lead single, "Steal Your Heart", was planned for a radio release on February 14 in order to coincide with Valentine's Day, but was released early on February 8 on AOL Music. Another song off the album "Just Stay Here Tonight" was used in an episode of Private Practice. "Steal Your Heart" was also used in the extended length Degrassi promo for the 11th season. They also performed "Steal Your Heart" at their second appearance on the Late Show with David Letterman, on May 25, 2011.

In July 2011 the band abruptly cancelled the remaining dates of their current tour. Soon after frontman Dan Layus revealed that fellow founding members Jared Palomar and Justin South had left the band. Around that time Augustana parted ways with Epic Records. On November 11, 2011, Layus announced that all remaining members had amicably parted ways, but that he would continue to tour and perform under the name Augustana. On 22 July 2013, Dan Layus announced that Augustana was signed to a new record deal.

=== Life Imitating Life, Side A, Solo work, Singles and Live (Recorded from a Livestream Event) (2014–2021) ===
In early 2014 the band announced that they had signed with Razor & Tie. On April 22, 2014, Augustana released the album, Life Imitating Life. They also premiered the first single, "Ash and Ember".

On September 2, 2015, Augustana released three new tracks ("Climb", "Must Be Love" and "You Can Have Mine") on an EP titled "Side A".

In 2016, they began touring as an opener for the Dixie Chicks on their DCX MMXVI World Tour.

On August 3, 2016, Augustana's social media sites changed their names to Dan Layus, the name of the sole remaining founding member and lead singer/songwriter.

Dan Layus released a solo album, Dangerous Things, on October 21, 2016. A new version of the Augustana track "You Can Have Mine" from the "Side A" EP was featured on Dangerous Things. In late 2017 and into 2018, Dan Layus referred to a follow-up solo project tentatively titled, "Dangerous Times", on his Twitter account; however, as of 2021, the follow-up project had not been publicly released.

On August 28, 2019, the song "For Now, Forever" was released as a digital single, with "The Heart of It" as its B-side, under the Augustana name. Augustana then embarked on a US tour in October 2019 into November 2019, with Zac Clark of Andrew McMahon in the Wilderness as a supporting act. On August 21, 2020, the songs "Okay" and "Lies" were released digitally, and on November 20, 2020, "Take" was released as another new digital single. Closing out the year, Augustana debuted a cover of "Make Someone Happy" from the musical Do Re Mi, on December 20, 2020.

The Live (Recorded from a Livestream Event) album was released on streaming platforms on March 19, 2021, with songs from a virtual concert that was held on December 3, 2020. On April 16, 2021, Layus announced the album would be pressed on a double vinyl and likely ship in April. On June 2, 2021, Layus announced an east coast solo tour to take place in November 2021. The tour continued in early 2022 with mid-west dates.

=== Everyday An Eternity, Yourself Yesterday: A Rarities Collection, Continued Touring, and Something Beautiful (2022–present) ===
Layus digitally released the single "Remedy" on January 20, 2022, written and produced with David Naish..

On May 20, 2022, Augustana released a surprise digital album, titled Everyday an Eternity. Layus shared on his website and social media accounts, "Everyday an Eternity is an album of solo piano works written at times when I’ve felt pulled towards artistic expression through the piano alone, while weaving lyricism into the instrument itself." A vinyl pre-order was announced shortly after, on June 6.

Yourself Yesterday: A Rarities Collection, an album of rare and previously unreleased tracks, was digitally released on August 19, 2022. Layus said the tracks spanned from the past decade.

The Everyday an Eternity tour, supporting both albums, took place in October and November 2022, and continued in May 2023.

A new single, "Stand On My Own", debuted August 4, 2023. Layus then performed solo as a supporting act for Owl City during his To The Moon tour. Following the tour, another new single was released on October 6, 2023, "Something Beautiful". Also in October, an April and May 2024 headlining tour was announced, with the promise of a new album coming before the tour. On March 4, 2024, Layus announced through his social medial accounts that Something Beautiful, a new full-length album would be released under the Augustana moniker on March 22, 2024. The album would mark the band's first rock LP since Life Imitating Life was released nearly 10 years prior. Layus said, "10 years in the making... Written throughout 2023 and sequenced in the order in which it was written, this record has found a special place in my heart and life. I'm honored to share this music with all of you and to play this album live next month on our headlining tour!!!". Four days following the announcement of the album, a vinyl pre-order would launch.

In 2025, guitarist, Chris Sachtleben and bassist, Jared Palomar would rejoin the band and they will be performing with Augustana this summer of 2025 just after 14 years of absence from the band.

== Band members ==
Current members

- Daniel Layus – vocals, guitar, piano (2002–2011, 2012–present)
- Chris Sachtleben – lead guitar, vocals (2006–2011, 2025–present)
- Jared Palomar – bass, keyboards, vocals (2004–2011, 2025–present)

Current touring members

- John David Kent – drums, percussion (2024–present)

Former members

- Josiah Rosen – lead guitar, vocals (2002-2006)
- Simeon Lohrmann – bass (2002–2003)
- Kyle Baker – drums (2002–2003)
- Josh Calhoun – drums (2004)
- Justin South – drums (2004–2011)
- David Lamoureux – keyboards, drums, percussion, vocals, programming, accordion, arrangement, musical director, (2005–2007, 2011–2013, 2019–2021)
- John Vincent – piano, keyboards, vocals (2007–2011)

Former touring members

- Jake Owen – bass, vocals (2019–2025)
- Jay Barclay – lead guitar, vocals (2011–2025)

== Discography ==
=== Studio albums ===
List of studio albums, with selected chart positions, sales figures and certifications
Title	Album details	Peak chart positions			Sales
Title	Album details	US	US Indie	US Rock	Sales
Midwest Skies and Sleepless Mondays	Released: 2003; Label: Self-released; Format: CD	—	—	—	US: 1,000
All the Stars and Boulevards	Released: September 6, 2005; Label: Epic; Format: CD, digital download	96	—	—	US: 345,000
Can't Love, Can't Hurt	Released: April 29, 2008; Label: Epic; Format: CD, digital download, vinyl	21	—	8	WW: 400,000; US: 121,000
Augustana	Released: April 26, 2011; Label: Epic; Format: CD, digital download	29	—	9	US: 29,000
Life Imitating Life	Released: April 22, 2014; Label: Washington Square; Format: CD, digital download	67	11	16	
Everyday an Eternity: Solo Piano Works	Released: May 20, 2022; Label: Plated Records; Format: Digital download, vinyl	—	—	—	
Something Beautiful	Released: March 22, 2024; Label: Independent; Format: Digital download, vinyl	—	—	—	
"—" denotes a recording that did not chart or was not released in that territory.

=== Compilation albums ===
List of compilation albums with selected details
Title	Details
Playlist: The Very Best of Augustana	Released: January 31, 2012; Label: Sony Music Entertainment; Formats: CD, digital download
Yourself Yesterday: A Rarities Collection	Released: August 19, 2022; Label: Plated Records; Format: Digital download

=== Live albums ===
List of live albums with selected details
Title	Details
Live (Recorded from a Livestream Event)	Released: March 19, 2021; Label: Plated Records; Formats: Digital download, vinyl
Chamber Works (Live with String Quartet)	Released: February 21, 2025; Label: Independent (Distributed by Stem); Formats: Digital download
Augustana (Live with String Quartet)	Released: April 25, 2025; Label: Independent (Distributed by Stem); Formats: Digital download

=== Extended plays ===
List of extended plays with selected details
Title	Details
Mayfield	Released: 2003; Label: Self-released; Formats: CD
Stars and Boulevards EP (Live)	Released: September 6, 2005; Label: Sony Music Entertainment; Format: Digital download
Boston EP	Released: September 5, 2006; Label: Epic, Legacy, Sony Music Entertainment; Format: Digital download
Live at Austin City Limits Music Festival 2007: Augustana	Released: November 6, 2007; Label: Sony Music Entertainment; Format: Digital download
Can't Love, Can't Hurt EP	Released: February 26, 2008; Label: Sony Music Entertainment; Format: Digital download
Side A	Released: September 15, 2015; Label: None; Format: Digital download

=== Singles ===
List of singles as lead artist, with selected chart positions, showing year released and album name
Title	Year	Peak chart positions									Album
Title	Year	US	US AAA	US Adult	US Pop 100	US Pop	US Rock Dig.	CAN	CAN CHR	CAN HAC	Album
"Stars and Boulevards"	2005	—	16	—	—	—	—	—	—	—	All the Stars and Boulevards
"Boston"	2006	34	9	10	31	24	48	82	47	45	All the Stars and Boulevards
"Sweet and Low"	2008	88	4	33	66	—	—	—	—	—	Can't Love, Can't Hurt
"I Still Ain't Over You"	2008	—	20	—	—	—	—	—	—	—	Can't Love, Can't Hurt
"Steal Your Heart"	2011	—	18	—	—	—	—	—	—	—	Augustana
"Just Stay Here Tonight"	2011	—	—	—	—	—	26	—	—	—	Augustana
"Ash and Ember"	2014	—	27	—	—	—	—	—	—	—	Life Imitating Life
"For Now, Forever/The Heart of It"	2019	—	—	—	—	—	—	—	—	—	Non-album singles
"Okay/Lies"	2020	—	—	—	—	—	—	—	—	—	Non-album singles
"Take"	2020	—	—	—	—	—	—	—	—	—	Non-album singles
"Make Someone Happy"	2020	—	—	—	—	—	—	—	—	—	Non-album singles
"Remedy"	2022	—	—	—	—	—	—	—	—	—	Non-album singles
"Echo" (with Mokita)	2022	—	—	—	—	—	—	—	—	—	Non-album singles
"Stand On My Own"	2023	—	—	—	—	—	—	—	—	—	Something Beautiful
"Something Beautiful"	2023	—	—	—	—	—	—	—	—	—	Something Beautiful
"—" denotes a release that did not chart.

== In popular culture ==
In The Big Bang Theory television series, episode 3, series 1, "The Fuzzy Boots Corollary", first aired October 8, 2007, main character Leonard Hofstadter sings the song "Boston".
