= Broken Hearts & Dirty Windows: Songs of John Prine, Vol. 2 =

Compilation album by Various artists
- Released: October 8, 2021
- Genre: Country music
- Length: 46:12
- Label: Oh Boy Records

Broken Hearts & Dirty Windows: Songs of John Prine, Vol. 2 is a 2021 tribute album featuring a dozen covers of John Prine songs performed by various artists. Recorded as a "celebration of John and an offering to his beloved family", following his unexpected death caused by complications from COVID-19 in April, 2020, Brandi Carlile, Nathaniel Rateliff, Bonnie Raitt, and Sturgill Simpson are among the artists contributing their interpretations of Prine's music to the album.

== Background ==
Jody Whelan, son of John Prine and his widow Fiona Whelan Prine and operator of Prine's Oh Boy Records, told Billboard Magazine's Rich Fury that multiple albums worth of covers were planned, with this album following the 2010 first volume, Broken Hearts & Dirty Windows: Songs of John Prine. Pointing to the rewards found in maintaining a legacy, Fiona Prine told Fury: "We had an enormous loss, but the gift is commensurate with the loss. What he left for us is a huge responsibility, and we take it very seriously."

== Reception ==
Reviews noted the "star-studded" lineup of artists on the album, while varying praise. Mike Davies of KLOF Magazine gave the performances excellent marks, writing in an overall assessment, "Doing ample justice to Prine’s talent and legacy, this is a terrific collection." Pitchfork reviewer Stephen M. Deusner was less enthusiastic, finding the performers in general somber, writing "they’re missing Prine’s wry sense of humor, his beatific sense of wonder." Deusner did find a bright spot in Amanda Shires' interpretation of "Saddle in the Rain", calling her humorous take on the sexual implications of covering the song from a female perspective "transformative, witty, fun...Shires shows how his songs welcome and even thrive on irreverence."

== Track listing ==
All songs written by John Prine except (1, 6):

1. "I Remember Everything" (Pat McLaughlin, John Prine) - Brandi Carlile - 2:36
2. "Pretty Good" - Nathaniel Rateliff & the Night Sweats - 3:49
3. "Saddle in the Rain" - Amanda Shires - 4:46
4. "Yes I Guess They Oughta Name a Drink After You" - Tyler Childers - 2:52
5. "Sweet Revenge" - Margo Price - 4:34
6. "Summer's End" (McLaughlin, Prine) - Valerie June - 3:29
7. "Souvenirs" - Jason Isbell - 4:21
8. "Angel from Montgomery" - Bonnie Raitt - 4:11
9. "Sam Stone" - John Paul White - 4:26
10. "One Red Rose" - Iris DeMent - 3:07
11. "Hello in There" - Emmylou Harris - 4:43
12. "Paradise" - Sturgill Simpson - 3:18

== Personnel ==
=== Musicians and track production ===
on (1), "I Remember Everything"

- Brandi Carlile – vocals, guitar, producer
- Ann Mincieli – producer

on (2), "Pretty Good"

- Nathaniel Rateliff – vocals, guitar
- Joseph Pope III – bass
- Mark Shusterman – keyboards
- Luke Mossman – electric guitar
- Patrick Meese – drums
- Jeff Dazey – tenor saxophone
- Andreas Wild – baritone saxophone
- Daniel Hardaway – trumpet
- RMB – producer, mixing
- James Barone – producer

on (3), "Saddle In The Rain"

- Amanda Shires – vocals
- Peter Levin – piano
- Peter Stroud – bass
- Audley Freed – guitars
- Fred Eltringham – drum
- Brittney Spencer – vocals
- Lawrence Rothman – producer, mixing
- Louis Remenapp – engineering
- Pete Lyman – mastering

on (4), "Yes I Guess They Oughta Name a Drink After You"

- Tyler Childers – vocals
- Rodney Elkins – drums
- Craig Burletic – bass
- Chase Lewis – piano
- James Barker – pedal steel
- Jesse Wells – acoustic guitar, baritone guitar, fiddle
- James Barker – recording, mixing

on (5), "Sweet Revenge"

- Margo Price – vocals, producer
- Kevin Black – bass, vocals
- Dillon Napier – drums, shaker, tambourine, vocals
- Jamie Davis – electric guitar, acoustic guitar, vocals
- Alex Munoz – electric guitar, vocals
- Micah Hulscher – piano, electric b3 organ
- Ashley Wilcoxson – vocals
- Vance Powell – producer

on (6), "Summer's End"

- Valerie June – vocals
- Dan Iead – guitar, pedal steel guitar
- Ryan Sawyer – drums
- Jason DiMatteo – bass
- Ben Rice – engineering, mixing

on (7), "Souvenirs"

- Jason Isbell – electric guitar, acoustic guitar, backing vocals, lead vocals, producer
- Chad Gamble – drums, percussion
- Jimbo Hart – bass
- Derry deBorja – piano
- Sadler Vaden – acoustic guitar
- Gena Johnson – engineering, mixing
- Louis Remenapp – engineering

on (8), "Angel from Montgomery"

- Bonnie Raitt – guitar, vocals
- James "Hutch" Hutchinson – bass, backing vocals
- Glenn Patscha – organ, backing vocals, recording, engineering
- Joel Jaffe – recording
- Matt Reagan – engineering
- Patrick Simmons – recording, engineering

on (9), "Sam Stone"

- John Paul White – vocals, acoustic guitar, bass, producer
- Ben Tanner – pump organ, producer, mixing
- Fats Kaplin – strings, steel guitar

on (10), "One Red Rose"

- Iris DeMent – vocals, piano
- Dave Jacques – bass, double bass (bowed bass)
- Jon Graboff – pedal steel guitar
- Bryan Owings – drums
- Brad Jones – mixing
- Pieta Brown – producer

on (11), "Hello in There"

- Emmylou Harris – vocals
- Bryan Sutton – acoustic guitar
- Jay Joyce – electric guitar (b-bender), producer
- Jason Hall – recording
- Court Blankenship – production assistant

on (12), "Paradise"

- Sturgill Simpson – vocals, guitar, backing vocals, producer
- Miles Miller – drums, backing vocals
- Mike Bub – bass, backing vocal
- Scott Vestal – banjo, backing vocals
- Sierra Hull – mandolin, backing vocals
- Stuart Duncan – fiddle, backing vocals
- Tim O'Brien – guitar, backing vocals
- Mark Howard – guitar, backing vocals
- Sean Sullivan – recording, mixing
- David Ferguson – producer, recording, mixing

=== Album production ===
- Pete Lyman – mastering
- Jody Whelan – executive producer, compilation producer
- Eileen Tilson – executive producer
- Fiona Whelan Prine – compilation producer
- Colin Fiddler – production coordination
