= Chad Gamble =

- Born: Tuscumbia, Alabama, U.S.
- Genres: Americana; Rock
- Instrument: Drums
- Member of: Jason Isbell and the 400 Unit

Chad Gamble is a drummer, songwriter, session musician, and producer, best known as a member of Jason Isbell's band, The 400 Unit.

== Personal life ==
Gamble grew up in Tuscumbia, AL and started playing drums at the age of 4. His first drum kit was a Muppets themed set and the first song that he learned to play was The Beach Boys’ “In My Room.” After graduating from the University of Alabama in 1997, he moved to Shreveport, LA, then Memphis, TN.

Gamble's older brother is Al Gamble of the R&B band St. Paul and the Broken Bones.

== Career ==
Gamble has toured with The Bluebirds, Gamble Brothers Band, and Jason Isbell and the 400 Unit. Gamble has been a part of the 400 Unit since 2008.

Gamble cites Levon Helm, Art Blakey, Zigaboo Modeliste, the Allman Brothers’ Butch Trucks, and Jaimoe Johanson as some of his biggest musical influences .

Gamble has won two Grammys for his contributions to Isbell's albums, The Nashville Sound and Weathervanes. The Memphis Chapter of the National Academy of Recording Arts and Sciences also nominated Gamble twice as "Premier Drummer".

He is currently an ambassador for Gretsch Drums and called signing with them a "defining moment" in his career.
