= Jason Isbell and the 400 Unit (album) =

Studio album by Jason Isbell
- Released: February 17, 2009
- Studios: FAME (Muscle Shoals); The Nutthouse (Sheffield); The Echo Lab (Denton)
- Genres: Americana, folk
- Label: Lightning Rod
- Producers: Jason Isbell and the 400 Unit; Matt Pence

Jason Isbell chronology
| Sirens of the Ditch (2007) | Jason Isbell and the 400 Unit (2009) | Here We Rest (2011) |

Professional ratings
Review scores
| Source | Rating |
|---|---|
| AllMusic | 4/5 stars |
| Pitchfork | 7.4/10 |
| Slant | 4.5/5 stars |

Jason Isbell and the 400 Unit is Jason Isbell's second full-length album, and first album with the 400 Unit as accompanying band. It was released on February 17, 2009, through Lightning Rod Records. The deluxe version of the album contains an additional four tracks.

On October 18, 2019, the album was re-released with remixing done by Dave Cobb and remastering done by Pete Lyman.

== Track listing ==
| No. | Title | Length |
|---|---|---|
| 1. | "Seven-Mile Island" | 4:16 |
| 2. | "Sunstroke" | 5:15 |
| 3. | "Good" | 4:45 |
| 4. | "Cigarettes and Wine" | 6:45 |
| 5. | "However Long" | 4:17 |
| 6. | "Coda" | 2:05 |
| 7. | "The Blue" | 4:57 |
| 8. | "No Choice in the Matter" | 5:30 |
| 9. | "Soldiers Get Strange" | 4:07 |
| 10. | "Streetlights" | 4:10 |
| 11. | "The Last Song I Will Write" | 5:54 |
| Total length: | | 52:01 |

Deluxe version bonus tracks
| No. | Title | Length |
|---|---|---|
| 12. | "When My Baby's Beside Me" | 3:36 |
| 13. | "Streetlights" (acoustic) | 3:47 |
| 14. | "The Blue" (acoustic) | 4:23 |
| 15. | "Cigarettes and Wine" (acoustic) | 5:38 |
| Total length: | | 69:25 |

Reissue track listing
| No. | Title | Length |
|---|---|---|
| 1. | "Seven-Mile Island" | 4:16 |
| 2. | "Sunstroke" | 5:15 |
| 3. | "Good" | 4:45 |
| 4. | "Cigarettes and Wine" | 6:45 |
| 5. | "However Long" | 4:17 |
| 6. | "The Blue" | 4:57 |
| 7. | "No Choice in the Matter" | 5:30 |
| 8. | "Soldiers Get Strange" | 4:07 |
| 9. | "Streetlights" | 4:10 |
| 10. | "The Last Song I Will Write" | 5:54 |
| 11. | "When My Baby's Beside Me" | 3:36 |
| 12. | "Coda" | 2:05 |
| Total length: | | 55:37 |

== Personnel ==
Jason Isbell and the 400 Units

- Jason Isbell – vocals, guitars, production
- Browan Lollar – guitars, production, cover, disc illustration
- Derry deBorja – keyboards, production
- Jimbo Hart – bass guitar, production

Additional contributors

- Matt Pence – drums, production, mixing
- Glenn Schick – mastering
- Jimmy Nutt – engineering
- Ben Tanner – engineering assistance
- Dixon Keel – engineering assistance
- Charles Rose – horns and horn arrangements on "No Choice in the Matter"
- Harvey Thompson – horns on "No Choice in the Matter"
- Vinny Ciesielski – horns on "No Choice in the Matter"
- Marc Harkness – design
- Allison V. Smith – photos
