= Foxes in the Snow =

Studio album by Jason Isbell
- Released: March 7, 2025
- Recorded: October 2024
- Studio: Electric Lady
- Length: 38:02
- Label: Southeastern
- Producer: Jason Isbell; Gena Johnson

Jason Isbell chronology
Weathervanes (2023)	Foxes in the Snow (2025)

Singles from Foxes in the Snow
- 1. "Bury Me" Released: January 14, 2025; 2. "Foxes in the Snow" Released: February 14, 2025

Foxes in the Snow is the tenth studio album by the American singer-songwriter Jason Isbell, released on March 7, 2025 on Southeastern. Produced by Isbell and Gena Johnson, the album was recorded in five days at Electric Lady Studios in New York, and is Isbell's first solo acoustic album. The album is also Isbell's first since his debut, Sirens of the Ditch (2007), not to feature any members of his backing band, The 400 Unit.

Preceded by the singles, "Bury Me" and "Foxes in the Snow", the album's lyrics are partly influenced by Isbell's divorce from Amanda Shires, his wife of eleven years and former bandmate, while also taking inspiration from a new relationship with artist Anna Weyant, who created the album's artwork.

== Background and recording ==
The album was recorded in five days at Electric Lady Studios in New York, with producer Gena Johnson. The album's stark, acoustic aesthetic features Isbell performing on a 1940 Martin guitar throughout.

Regarding his decision to record Foxes in the Snow on his own, without the participation of his backing band The 400 Unit, Isbell noted: "I don’t want to keep doing stuff that’s easy. A lot of the stories on this record, a lot of these details and a lot of these songs are very personal. I didn’t want to force anybody else to be in the room with that. When you’re being this open and this vulnerable, there’s something about doing it alone. Even though you know that the results are going to get broadcast to everybody, there’s something about sitting with a guitar and singing a song that makes sense to me when it’s this personal."

== Writing and composition ==
The album's lyrical content was partly influenced by Isbell's recent divorce from Amanda Shires, his wife of eleven years and former bandmate. Isbell lists the tracks, "Eileen", "Gravelweed" and "True Believer", as songs that directly address their break-up: "With those three songs, especially, I’m trying to talk about a period in my life that was difficult, a lot of change. I got a divorce. I moved out of the house. I’m trying to help raise my daughter through all of this and deal with the fallout of the relationship. What I want to do is to be able to zoom out and sort of see things from a perspective that’s past simple bitterness or anger or resentment or anything like that. And I want to look at it from the point of view of what was this period in my life? In what ways was this formative for me? And how did I treat the other people who were involved? And how can I use that information to grow as a human being into whatever’s next? And all three of those songs deal with that."

Several tracks on the album are written from the perspective of starting a new romance, with Isbell writing about his current relationship with artist Anna Weyant, who created the album's artwork: "I’m trying to come into all of these songs, all these stories, with as much gratitude as I can have. And I’m trying to shape that, sit across the table with the version of myself that I’m not necessarily the most comfortable with and shape that into something that can bring a listener some joy."

== Track listing ==
All tracks are written by Jason Isbell.

Foxes in the Snow track listing
No.	Title	Length
1.	"Bury Me"	3:02
2.	"Ride to Robert's"	4:25
3.	"Eileen"	3:28
4.	"Gravelweed"	3:20
5.	"Don't Be Tough"	3:24
6.	"Open and Close"	2:55
7.	"Foxes in the Snow"	3:20
8.	"Crimson and Clay"	3:02
9.	"Good While It Lasted"	4:03
10.	"True Believer"	3:46
11.	"Wind Behind the Rain"	3:10
Total length:		38:02

== Personnel ==
Credits adapted from the album's liner notes.

- Jason Isbell – vocals, guitar, production
- Gena Johnson – production, mixing, engineering
- Pete Lyman – mastering
- Daniel Bacigalupi – mastering assistance
- Michael Deano – engineering assistance
- Anna Weyant – cover painting
- Sarah Goldstein – art direction
- Will Welch – photography

== Charts ==
Chart performance for Foxes in the Snow
Chart (2025)	Peak position
Belgian Albums (Ultratop Flanders)	196
Dutch Albums (Album Top 100)	51
Scottish Albums (OCC)	6
UK Albums (OCC)	58
UK Independent Albums (OCC)	3
US Billboard 200	27
US Americana/Folk Albums (Billboard)	2
US Independent Albums (Billboard)	5
US Top Country Albums (Billboard)	4
US Top Rock & Alternative Albums (Billboard)	4
