= Roman candle =

Roman candle(s) may refer to:

== Film and television ==
- Roman Candles (1966 film), an American short film by John Waters
- Roman Candles (1920 film), an American silent comedy-drama directed by Jack Pratt
- "Roman Candle" (Brand New Cherry Flavor), a 2021 TV episode

== Literature ==
- Roman Candle, a 1956 book by Letitia Baldrige
- Roman Candle, a 1960 play by Sidney Sheldon
- Roman Candle, a 2010 biography of Bobby Darin by David Evanier

== Music ==
- Roman Candle (band), an American indie rock band from Chapel Hill, North Carolina
- Roman Candle (hardcore band), an American hardcore band from Las Vegas, Nevada
- Roman Candle (album), by Elliott Smith, or the title song, 1994
- "Roman Candle", a song by Morgan Wade from Psychopath, 2023
- "Roman Candles", a song by Death Cab for Cutie from Asphalt Meadows, 2022

== Other uses ==
- Roman candle (firework), a type of firework
- Roman Candle (Portland, Oregon), a defunct bakery and pizzeria in the United States
- Malfunction (parachuting), a parachute malfunction, where the canopy comes out of the D-bag, but fails to deploy and develop

== See also ==
- Nero's Torches, or Candlesticks of Christianity, an 1876 painting by Henryk Siemiradzki
