= Psychopath (album) =

2023 studio album by American country musician Morgan Wade

Studio album by Morgan Wade
- Released: August 25, 2023
- Recorded: Mid-2022
- Studio: Sound Emporium (Nashville); Curb (Nashville); The Smoakstack (Nashville); TJV (Franklin)
- Genre: Country
- Length: 47:54
- Label: RCA Nashville; Ladylike
- Producer: Sadler Vaden

Morgan Wade chronology
Reckless (2021)	Psychopath (2023)	Obsessed (2024)

Psychopath is the third studio album by American country music artist Morgan Wade. It was released on August 25, 2023, through RCA Nashville. The release was recorded immediately after her breakthrough Reckless and received positive reviews from critics.

== Content ==
I wrote ‘Psychopath’ before Reckless actually even came out. It was one of those songs for me where I just sat down, wrote it, and was done in one take. I came up with that song and memorized it immediately. I never wrote it down. Then I had it and was like, ‘Okay, this one sticks.’ It stuck in my head. I’ve always wanted to put [the term] ‘psychopath’ in a song. You especially don’t expect a country song to be called ‘Psychopath.’ So for me, it was taking that with [the thought of], ‘I love you so much’ and ‘what was I doing before I met you? I don’t even remember a time before you. We are crazy, and this is different, but I love you.'”

— Wade on writing and recording the title track to Psychopath

Wade co-wrote all 13 tracks on Psychopath, and Sadler Vaden produced the project.

== Reception ==
Hal Horowitz of American Songwriter gave this album three out of five stars, praising tracks that "highlight Wade’s clear, tough, yet emotional vocals" and the songwriting, but criticizing that "the album would be better if draped in starker surroundings for a less-is-more appeal". BrooklynVegan included this among their 13 Great Country Albums from 2023, with critic Andrew Sacher writing that "Morgan has a way of blurring the lines between country traditions, punk grit, and pop appeal, but more important than any of her stylistic choices is just how strong her songwriting is... the way she turns a phrase and delivers a melody will catch you off guard on first listen".

A profile of Wade by The Los Angeles Times included the assessment by Jewly Hight that this music has an "alpha attitude and potent vulnerability make for one of current country music’s more bracing dispatches". John Amen of No Depression stated that this album "continues to display [Wade's] versatility, crafting accessible narratives while reveling in textbook hooks" and "highlights her broadening range and skillful integrations of country, rock, and pop elements". In The Sydney Morning Herald, Robert Moran rated this album four out of five stars, praising Wade's songwriting abilities and how among "songs touching on her wobbly relationship with addiction, she cuts an edgy figure among her clean-cut, all-American country cohorts". Poppie Platt of The Daily Telegraph gave Psychopath three out of five stars, ending that it "may not thrill the country purists out there, it’s a promising next step for an artist who could be well on her way to making the rare crossover into the mainstream charts".

== Track listing ==
Psychopath track listing
No.	Title	Writer(s)	Length
1.	"Domino"	Morgan Wade; Ashley Monroe; Sadler Vaden; Butch Walker	3:27
2.	"80's Movie"	Wade; Vaden	3:51
3.	"Losers Look like Me"	Wade	3:29
4.	"Roman Candle"	Wade	4:07
5.	"Guns and Roses"	Wade; Natalie Hemby; Vaden	3:36
6.	"Alanis"	Wade; Hemby; Vaden	4:26
7.	"Phantom Feelings"	Wade; Julia Michaels; Ben Rice	3:52
8.	"Psychopath"	Wade	3:28
9.	"Outrun Me"	Wade; Hillary Lindsey; Lori McKenna; Liz Rose; Vaden	3:47
10.	"Want"	Wade; Monroe; Angaleena Presley	3:32
11.	"Fall in Love with Me"	Wade	3:15
12.	"Meet Somebody"	Wade; Vaden	3:19
13.	"27 Club"	Wade	3:43
Total length:			47:58

== Personnel ==
Credits adapted from the album's liner notes.

=== Musicians ===
- Fred Eltringham – drums, percussion
- Aaron Sterling – drums, percussion
- Jimbo Hart – bass
- Eli Beaird – bass
- Sadler Vaden – electric guitar, acoustic guitar, B-Bender guitar, rubber bridge guitar, harmonica, keyboards, synthesizer, piano, background vocals
- Billy Justineau – keyboards, synthesizer, Mellotron, B-3 organ, string machine, Wurlitzer
- Derry deBorja – piano, Moog
- Jarrad Kritzstein – upright piano, Mellotron
- Eleanore Denig – strings
- Morgan Wade – lead vocals, background vocals
- Gena Johnson – background vocals
- Drew Erwin – background vocals
- Ashley Monroe – background vocals
- Leigh Nash – background vocals
- Katie Pruitt – background vocals
- Brittney Spencer – background vocals

=== Technical ===
- Sadler Vaden – production (all tracks); additional recording, digital editing (track 8)
- Owen Lewis – mixing, recording (tracks 1–3, 6, 10, 11, 13)
- Matt Ross-Spang – mixing (tracks 4, 5, 7, 8, 9, 12)
- Darrell Thorp – mixing (track 12)
- Gena Johnson – recording (tracks 2, 4, 5, 7–9, 12), digital editing (8), additional vocal production (12)
- Paul Ebersold – digital editing (track 8)
- Skyler Chuckry – recording assistance (tracks 1–3, 6, 10, 11, 13)
- Craig White – recording assistance (tracks 2, 4, 5, 7–9, 12)
- Zack Zinck – recording assistance (track 8)
- Scott Johnson – production management

=== Visuals ===
- Matthew Berinato –packaging design, photography

== Chart performance ==
Psychopath reached sixth place on Billboard's Top Heatseekers and 45 on Country Albums.

Chart (2023)	Peak position
US Top Country Albums (Billboard)	45

== See also ==
- 2023 in American music
- List of 2023 albums
