= Georgia Blue =

Studio album by Jason Isbell and the 400 Unit
- Released: October 15, 2021
- Recorded: 2020–2021
- Length: 67:51
- Label: Southeastern

Jason Isbell and the 400 Unit chronology
Reunions (2020)	Georgia Blue (2021)	Weathervanes (2023)

Georgia Blue is the eighth studio album released by Jason Isbell, and the fifth accompanied by his backing band the 400 Unit. It was released first on streaming services on October 15, 2021, through Southeastern Records, with a CD and vinyl (for Record Store Day Black Friday).

== Background ==
On November 5, 2020, Isbell announced on Twitter that if Joe Biden won the state of Georgia in the 2020 United States presidential election, he would record a charity album featuring covers of songs by Georgia artists. After it was projected that Biden had won the state, along with the subsequent double Senate runoff election wins of Senate Democrats Jon Ossoff and Raphael Warnock, he reaffirmed on Twitter that he was being serious and that he would begin work on the album shortly.

== Track listing ==
Georgia Blue track listing
No.	Title	Writer(s)	Original performer(s)	Length
1.	"Nightswimming" (featuring Béla Fleck and Chris Thile)	Bill Berry, Peter Buck, Mike Mills, Michael Stipe	R.E.M.	3:59
2.	"Honeysuckle Blue" (featuring Sadler Vaden)	Kevn Kinney	Drivin' 'n' Cryin'	5:16
3.	"It's a Man's Man's Man's World" (featuring Brittney Spencer)	James Brown, Betty Jean Newsome	James Brown	4:31
4.	"Cross Bones Style" (featuring Amanda Shires)	Chan Marshall	Cat Power	6:23
5.	"The Truth" (featuring Adia Victoria)	Precious Bryant	Precious Bryant	3:32
6.	"I've Been Loving You Too Long"	Otis Redding, Jerry Butler	Otis Redding	3:11
7.	"Sometimes Salvation" (featuring Steve Gorman)	Chris Robinson, Rich Robinson	The Black Crowes	5:01
8.	"Kid Fears" (featuring Julien Baker and Brandi Carlile)	Amy Ray	Indigo Girls	4:10
9.	"Reverse"	Andy LeMaster	Now It's Overhead	4:52
10.	"Midnight Train to Georgia" (featuring Brittney Spencer and John Paul White)	Jim Weatherly	Gladys Knight & the Pips	4:50
11.	"In Memory of Elizabeth Reed" (featuring Peter Levin)	Dickey Betts	The Allman Brothers Band	12:19
12.	"I'm Through"	Vic Chesnutt	Vic Chesnutt	6:12
13.	"Driver 8" (featuring John Paul White)	Bill Berry, Peter Buck, Mike Mills, Michael Stipe	R.E.M.	3:35
Total length:				67:51

== Charts ==
Chart performance for Georgia Blue
Chart (2021)	Peak position
Scottish Albums (OCC)	59
UK Independent Albums (OCC)	23
US Billboard 200	83
US Folk Albums (Billboard)	6
US Independent Albums (Billboard)	48
