= Reckless (Morgan Wade album) =

Studio album by Morgan Wade
- Released: March 19, 2021
- Studio: The Bakery (Nashville)
- Genres: Country; alternative country; Americana
- Length: 38:49
- Labels: Thirty Tigers; Arista Nashville
- Producers: Paul Ebersold; Sadler Vaden

Morgan Wade chronology
| Puppets with My Heart (2018) | Reckless (2021) | Psychopath (2023) |

Reckless is the second studio album and major-label debut by American country music artist Morgan Wade. It was released on March 19, 2021, through the Thirty Tigers label.

== Release ==
The track "Wilder Days" was released as a single and peaked at number 36 on the Billboard Hot Country Songs chart and number 29 on the Country Airplay chart.

On January 28, 2022, a deluxe edition of the album was released with six additional tracks. This re-release was done through Arista Nashville. One of the six bonus tracks is a cover of Elvis Presley's "Suspicious Minds".

== Reception ==
Professional ratings
Review scores
| Source | Rating |
|---|---|
| Slant Magazine | 4/5 stars |

Slant Magazine critic Jim Malec stated that Wade "blends pop and country without subjugating either, all the while covering a wide swath of stylistic ground". No Depression critic Rachel Cholst praised the album, stating that "the songs are easy on the ears, but transgressive in insisting that listeners wrestle with tough topics." According to critic Robert Christgau, "this is the most sexually explicit country record [he as] ever heard."

== Track listing ==
| No. | Title | Writer(s) | Length |
|---|---|---|---|
| 1. | "Wilder Days" | Morgan Wade; Sadler Vaden | 4:11 |
| 2. | "Matches and Metaphors" | Wade; Vaden | 3:17 |
| 3. | "Other Side" | Wade | 3:12 |
| 4. | "Don't Cry" | Wade; Paul Ebersold | 3:39 |
| 5. | "Mend" | Wade | 4:54 |
| 6. | "Last Cigarette" | Wade; Ebersold; Vaden | 2:49 |
| 7. | "Take Me Away" | Wade | 3:45 |
| 8. | "Reckless" | Wade; Vaden | 3:44 |
| 9. | "Northern Air" | Wade; Vaden | 4:51 |
| 10. | "Met You" | Wade | 4:33 |

Deluxe edition bonus tracks
| No. | Title | Writer(s) | Length |
|---|---|---|---|
| 11. | "Carry Me Home" | Wade | 3:40 |
| 12. | "When the Dirt All Settles" | Wade; Vaden; Jaren Johnston | 2:22 |
| 13. | "Run" | Wade | 3:33 |
| 14. | "The Night" | Wade | 4:23 |
| 15. | "Through Your Eyes" | Wade; Vaden | 3:22 |
| 16. | "Suspicious Minds" | Mark James | 3:39 |

== Personnel ==
=== Musicians ===
- Morgan Wade – vocals
- Sadler Vaden – background vocals, electric guitars, acoustic guitar, 12-string acoustic guitar, bass, keyboards, synthesizers (all tracks); Mellotron (tracks 1–10); 12-string electric slide guitar, baritone guitar, slide guitar, drum programming (11–16)
- Paul Ebersold – keyboards (all tracks), synthesizers (tracks 1–10), drums (6); Mellotron, piano (11–16)
- Jamie Dick – drums, percussion (tracks 1, 2, 5, 9, 11–16)
- Fred Eltringham – drums, percussion (tracks 3, 4, 7, 8, 11–16)
- Jimbo Hart – bass (tracks 3, 7, 8, 11–16)
- Derry deBorja – keyboards (tracks 7, 10), piano (8)
- Eli Beaird – bass (tracks 11–16)
- Jarrad Kritzstein – piano, Mellotron, Wurlitzer (tracks 11–16)
- Parker Cason – B-3 organ (tracks 11–16)
- Kai Welch – vocoder (tracks 11–16)

=== Technical ===
- Sadler Vaden – production, mixing (all tracks); digital editing, additional recording (tracks 11–16)
- Paul Ebersold – production, engineering (tracks 1–10); mixing (all tracks), recording (12), digital editing (11–16)
- Richard Dodd – mastering
- Gena Johnson – recording, digital editing (tracks 11–16)
- Park Cason – recording (track 14)
- Zoe Babyar – mixing assistance (tracks 11–16)
- Zack Zinck – recording assistance (tracks 11–16)
- Scott Johnson – production management (tracks 11–16)

=== Visuals ===
- David McClister – photography
- Keith Brogdon – original cover design
- Matthew Berinato – packaging design

== Chart performance ==
| Chart (2022) | Peak position |
|---|---|
| US Americana/Folk Albums (Billboard) | 8 |
| US Top Country Albums (Billboard) | 30 |
