= Green Hill, Alabama =

Unincorporated community in Alabama, United States

Greenhill, Alabama
- Unincorporated community
- Location within Alabama Location within the United States
- Coordinates: 34°58′23″N 87°30′44″W
- Country: United States
- State: Alabama
- County: Lauderdale
- Elevation: 751 ft (229 m)
- Time zone: UTC-6 (Central (CST))
  - Summer (DST): UTC-5 (CDT)
- Area code: 256
- GNIS feature ID: 119341

Green Hill is an unincorporated community in Lauderdale County, Alabama.

Green Hill is the hometown of Iron Horse Bluegrass, Secret Sisters, and Jason Isbell, a singer-songwriter and former member of the Drive-By Truckers.
