= Reunions (album) =

Studio album by Jason Isbell and The 400 Unit
- Released: May 15, 2020
- Recorded: 2019
- Studio: RCA Studio A (Nashville)
- Genres: Americana, folk rock
- Length: 41:10
- Label: Southeastern
- Producer: Dave Cobb

Jason Isbell and The 400 Unit chronology
The Nashville Sound (2017)	Reunions (2020)	Georgia Blue (2021)

Reunions is the seventh studio album by Jason Isbell, and the fourth credited to "Jason Isbell and the 400 Unit". In an attempt to help small businesses during the COVID-19 pandemic, the album was released by Southeastern Records in independent record stores on May 8, 2020, which was one week before its wide release on May 15. The songs "Be Afraid", "What've I Done to Help", and "Only Children" were released as singles prior to the release of the full album. In the United States, Reunions peaked at number 9 on the Billboard 200 chart.

== Background ==
Isbell has noted that the common thread throughout the album is reunions with ghosts, both living and dead, from his past life. He told Vinyl Me, Please magazine that "there’s ghosts all over the record, and that’s why I called it Reunions, because that’s what a ghost is: reuniting with somebody long enough for them to tell you what you missed the first time around."

In an interview with NPR Music, he elaborated, saying that "initially, I was just trying to write a bunch of good songs and I think that's always how it starts for me...What happened with this record: after I wrote a couple songs, I started noticing patterns. I started seeing the fact that I was going back in time and reconnecting, at least on a psychological level, with a lot of the people, a lot of the relationships that I had growing up and when I was younger and before I got sober. I got sober eight and a half years ago. For a long spell, between the time when I got sober and just the last couple years, it was really difficult for me to revisit those times in a way that was anything less than judgmental. Because I had to look back at myself with disdain and not risk turning back into the person I used to be."

Songs like "Only Children" and "Dreamsicle" take a bittersweet look back at Isbell's childhood, while "Be Afraid" and "What've I Done To Help" address current events and political anxiety in the United States. "It Gets Easier" explicitly addresses the struggles of Isbell's newfound sobriety with the refrain: "it gets easier, but it never gets easy"; he told NPR that "The song is about looking at this from a perspective of time, and the fact that the song happens to a person who isn't recently sober, somebody who's been working on it for a while."

== Critical reception ==
Professional ratings
Aggregate scores
Source	Rating
Metacritic	82/100
Review scores
Source	Rating
AllMusic	4.5/5 stars
American Songwriter	4/5 stars
And It Don't Stop	(3-star Honorable Mention)
Exclaim!	9/10
Flood Magazine	7/10
The Line of Best Fit	8/10
Paste	8/10
Pitchfork	7.8/10
Rolling Stone	3.5/5 stars
Under the Radar	8/10

The album received positive reviews from music critics. On Metacritic, it has a weighted average score of 82 out of 100 based on 16 reviews, indicating "universal acclaim".

Mark Deming of AllMusic gave the album 4.5 out of 5 stars and commented on how it seemed to address the anxiety and unrest resulting from the COVID-19 pandemic, despite being written before it began: "The fact these songs seem so telling in a strange and difficult time has a bit to do with coincidence, but more important is the excellence of Isbell's songwriting". In his "Consumer Guide" column, Robert Christgau highlighted the songs "It Gets Easier" and "What've I Done to Help?", and wrote of the album: "Lest anyone think he’s full of himself, this brave, soulful, articulate Nashville conscience singer turns the high beam on his own moral shortcomings".

=== Accolades ===
Accolades for Reunions
Publication	Accolade	Rank	Ref.
Billboard	Billboard's 50 Best Albums of 2020 – Mid-Year	N/A	
Billboard	Top 50 Best Albums of 2020	30	
Consequence of Sound	Top 50 Albums of 2020	11	
Double J	Top 50 Albums of 2020	31	
Mojo	Top 75 Albums of 2020	73	
Paste	Paste's 25 Best Albums of 2020 – Mid-Year	6	
Paste	The 50 Best Albums of 2020	12	
PopMatters	The 60 Best Albums of 2020	25	
Stereogum	Stereogum's 50 Best Albums of 2020 – Mid-Year	11	
Stereogum	The 50 Best Albums of 2020	37	
Rolling Stone	The 50 Best Albums of 2020	28	
Variety	Variety's Best Albums of 2020 – Mid-Year	N/A	

== Track listing ==
All tracks written by Jason Isbell except where noted.

No.	Title	Length
1.	"What've I Done to Help" (Isbell, Michael Kiwanuka)	6:40
2.	"Dreamsicle"	3:44
3.	"Only Children"	3:57
4.	"Overseas"	5:07
5.	"Running with Our Eyes Closed"	3:42
6.	"River"	3:22
7.	"Be Afraid"	3:19
8.	"St. Peter's Autograph"	4:11
9.	"It Gets Easier"	3:47
10.	"Letting You Go"	3:23
Total length:		41:10

== Personnel ==
Credits adapted from AllMusic.

The 400 Unit

- Jason Isbell – vocals, background vocals, electric guitar, acoustic guitar, piano
- Derry Deborja – piano, organ, keyboards, omnichord
- Chad Gamble – drums, tambourine
- Jimbo Hart – bass
- Amanda Shires – fiddle, background vocals
- Sadler Vaden – electric guitar, acoustic guitar, nylon acoustic guitar

Additional musicians

- Dave Cobb – shaker
- David Crosby – background vocals
- Jay Buchanan – background vocals

Production and design

- Dave Cobb – producer, mixing
- Gena Johnson – engineer
- Toby Hurlbert – assistant engineer
- Pete Lyman – mastering
- Daniel Bacigalupi – mastering assistant
- Jason Isbell – cover photo
- Chantry Barnett – cover model
- Keir Novesky – custom title lettering
- Fetzer Design – art direction

== Charts ==
=== Weekly charts ===
Chart performance for Reunions
Chart (2020)	Peak position
Australian Albums (ARIA)	19
Belgian Albums (Ultratop Flanders)	138
Canadian Albums (Billboard)	58
Dutch Albums (Album Top 100)	27
German Albums (Offizielle Top 100)	94
Norwegian Albums (VG-lista)	10
Scottish Albums (Official Charts)	2
Swedish Albums (Sverigetopplistan)	31
UK Albums (Official Charts)	18
UK Country Albums (Official Charts)	1
US Billboard 200	9
US Top Country Albums (Billboard)	1
US Top Folk Albums (Billboard)	1
US Top Rock Albums (Billboard)	1

=== Year-end charts ===
Year-end chart performance for Reunions
Chart (2020)	Position
US Top Country Albums (Billboard)	76
US Top Rock Albums (Billboard)	77
