= Cover Me Up =

Song by Jason Isbell

Song by Jason Isbell

from the album Southeastern
- Released: 2013
- Genre: Americana
- Length: 4:54
- Label: Southeastern
- Songwriter: Jason Isbell
- Producer: Dave Cobb

"Cover Me Up" is a song written and recorded by American singer-songwriter Jason Isbell. It is the first track on his 2013 studio album Southeastern.

== Content and history ==
Isbell told NPR in 2013 that he wrote the song about his wife, Amanda Shires. He described the song as "a hard one for me to even get through without breaking down the first time" because of how personally he felt that it expressed his love for Shires. The corresponding album came after Isbell had ended alcohol rehabilitation. The Bluegrass Situation describes the song as " Solemn, stripped-down, and slow, it floors listeners with its stark vulnerability and the strength of its romance as Isbell unfolds his love for Amanda Shires".

The song is composed in the key of E-flat major. It uses a 6/8 time signature with an approximate tempo of 44 beats per minute.

== Critical reception ==
Steve Leggett, in his review of the album for AllMusic, called "Cover Me Up" a "beautiful opening love song". Writing for Paste, Jerrick Adams stated in a review of Southeastern that " on the one hand a gentle, insistent love song, and on the other a moving testament to personal redemption that never once turns a blind eye to past indiscretions. It sets the tone for the remainder of the album, which is given equally to the promise of romance and the ever-looming possibility of suffering, both self-induced and arbitrary." In 2020, Paste ranked the song number one on their list of the 20 greatest Jason Isbell songs, and in 2022, American Songwriter ranked the song number four on their list of the 10 greatest Jason Isbell songs.

== Certifications ==
Region	Certification	Certified units/sales
United States (RIAA)	Gold	500,000^{‡}
^{‡} Sales+streaming figures based on certification alone.

== Morgan Wallen version ==
"Cover Me Up"

Promotional single by Morgan Wallen

from the album Dangerous: The Double Album
- Released: April 5, 2019
- Genre: Country
- Length: 4:53
- Label: Big Loud
- Songwriter: Jason Isbell
- Producers: Joey Moi; Dave Cohen

Lyric video
- "Cover Me Up" on YouTube

Short film
- "Cover Me Up" on YouTube

In November 2020, Wallen's cover of "Cover Me Up" was announced as one of the tracks on his then-upcoming album Dangerous: The Double Album. Wallen's version is co-produced by Joey Moi and Dave Cohen.

Wallen had covered the song in concert for more than a year prior to the release of his studio version, including performances on a tour with Luke Combs and during a video shoot created by the country music website Taste of Country. The latter publication noted that while Wallen's live covers had received mixed reception from fans, Isbell himself stated approval toward Wallen's rendition. Although not released as a single, Wallen's rendition charted on the Billboard Hot 100, Hot Country Songs and Canadian Hot 100 charts between 2019 and 2020. It has also received a platinum certification from the Recording Industry Association of America (RIAA) and Music Canada.

Wallen uploaded an 8-minute short film on November 22, 2019, directed by Justin Clough and filmed near Leiper's Fork, Tennessee. The video portrays the song's storyline through a soldier who is suffering post-traumatic stress disorder.

After a controversy surrounding a video of Wallen shouting a racial slur in February 2021, Isbell announced that he would donate his songwriting royalties to the Nashville chapter of the NAACP.

=== Chart performance ===
==== Weekly charts ====
Chart (2019–2021)	Peak position
Canada Hot 100 (Billboard)	50
US Billboard Hot 100	52
US Hot Country Songs (Billboard)	15

==== Year-end charts ====
Chart (2020)	Position
US Hot Country Songs (Billboard)	97

=== Certifications ===
Region	Certification	Certified units/sales
Australia (ARIA)	2× Platinum	140,000^{‡}
Canada (Music Canada)	3× Platinum	240,000^{‡}
New Zealand (RMNZ)	Platinum	30,000^{‡}
United Kingdom (BPI)	Silver	200,000^{‡}
United States (RIAA)	8× Platinum	8,000,000^{‡}
^{‡} Sales+streaming figures based on certification alone.

== Other versions ==
The song has also been covered by the Zac Brown Band, released exclusively to Spotify in 2017. Rodney Atkins released a version of the song, appearing on his album Caught Up in the Country (2019), as did Warren Zeiders, on his 2021 album Acoustic Covers.
