= Obsessed (Morgan Wade album) =

Studio album by Morgan Wade
- Released: August 16, 2024
- Genre: Country
- Length: 54:14
- Label: RCA Nashville; Ladylike
- Producer: Clint Wells

Morgan Wade chronology
Psychopath (2023)	Obsessed (2024)	The Party Is Over (recovered) (2025)

Obsessed is the fourth studio album by American country music artist Morgan Wade. It released on August 16, 2024, through RCA Nashville.

== Content ==
Wade wrote all 13 tracks on Obsessed, and Clint Wells produced the project.

== Reception ==
Ed Power of iNews gave this album four stars and praised the album by saying "The album lacks the big corporate gloss of Psychopath, but the grittier framing gives her material room to breathe and showcases her taut, expressive voice. In a departure from previous projects, Wade wrote all the songs herself, often after shows. Forged amid a combination of jetlag and loneliness, it pulsates with hallucinatory imagery and wee-hours anxiety."

== Track listing ==
All tracks are written by Morgan Wade.

Obsessed track listing
No.	Title	Length
1.	"Total Control"	3:55
2.	"Department Store"	3:56
3.	"Time to Love, Time to Kill"	3:48
4.	"Obsessed"	4:04
5.	"Juliet"	3:47
6.	"2AM in London"	3:03
7.	"Hansel and Gretel"	3:50
8.	"Spin"	3:20
9.	"Reality"	3:47
10.	"Walked on Water" (featuring Kesha)	3:20
11.	"Halloween"	3:15
12.	"Crossing State Lines"	6:41
13.	"Moth to a Flame"	3:52
14.	"Deconstruction"	3:34

== Personnel ==
Musicians

- Morgan Wade – lead vocals
- Clint Wells – acoustic guitar (all tracks), electric guitar (tracks 1–5, 12), background vocals (1–3), percussion (8)
- Sam Wilson – pedal steel guitar (tracks 1, 2, 4, 6–10, 12–14), electric guitar (1–4, 9, 12), acoustic guitar (1, 8), steel guitar (14)
- Annie Wildgen – background vocals (tracks 1–9)
- Tony Lucido – bass guitar (tracks 1–5, 7–9, 12, 14)
- Nathan Sexton – percussion (tracks 1–5, 7, 9, 10, 12, 14), drums (1–5, 7, 9, 12, 14)
- Johnny Sword – background vocals (tracks 1, 3, 4), bass guitar (8)
- Billy Justineau – organ (tracks 1, 7, 12), synthesizer (1), piano (7, 12), vibraphone (12)
- Don Eanes – piano (tracks 2–6, 9–11, 13, 14), organ (2–5, 9, 10, 14), harmonium (11), synthesizer (13, 14)
- Alex Dezen – background vocals (tracks 5, 9)
- Paul Moak – synthesizer (track 9)
- Kesha – vocals (track 10)
- Eleonore Denig – strings (track 11)

Technical

- Clint Wells – production (all tracks), engineering (tracks 4, 10, 11), editing (1, 2, 4, 6–8, 10–12)
- Zack Zinck – mixing, engineering (all tracks); editing (1, 7, 8, 12)
- Sam Moses – mastering
- Clay Jones – engineering (tracks 2, 5)
- Joe Trentacosti – engineering, editing (tracks 3, 5, 9, 13, 14)
- Steve Blackmon – engineering (tracks 3, 5, 9, 13, 14)
- James McLaughlin – engineering (tracks 4, 10, 11)
- Matt Dyson – vocal engineering, editing (track 10)
- Brandon Hapgood – editing (tracks 2–6, 9–11, 13, 14)
- Samuel Hayes – editing (tracks 2–6, 9–11, 13, 14)
- Paul Moak – engineering assistance

== Charts ==
Chart performance for Obsessed
Chart (2024)	Peak position
Scottish Albums (OCC)	34
UK Album Downloads (OCC)	25
UK Albums Sales (OCC)	30
UK Americana Albums (OCC)	8
UK Country Albums (OCC)	3
