= Something More Than Free =

Studio album by Jason Isbell
- Released: July 17, 2015
- Recorded: March 2015
- Studio: Sound Emporium (Nashville, Tennessee)
- Genre: Americana, alternative country
- Length: 43:55
- Label: Southeastern
- Producer: Dave Cobb

Jason Isbell chronology
Southeastern (2013)	Something More Than Free (2015)	The Nashville Sound (2017)

Something More Than Free is the fifth studio album by Jason Isbell, released on July 17, 2015. It was produced by Dave Cobb, who had produced Isbell's previous record, Southeastern (2013). At the 58th Annual Grammy Awards, the album won the award for Best Americana Album, and the song "24 Frames" won the award for Best American Roots Song.

== Reception ==
Professional ratings
Aggregate scores
Source	Rating
AnyDecentMusic?	8.2/10
Metacritic	87/100
Review scores
Source	Rating
AllMusic	4/5 stars
The A.V. Club	A−
The Daily Telegraph	5/5 stars
Entertainment Weekly	A
The Irish Times	4/5 stars
Mojo	4/5 stars
Pitchfork	5.8/10
Rolling Stone	4/5 stars
Spin	7/10
Vice	A−

The album received mostly positive reviews. On Metacritic, it has a score of 87 out of 100 based on 25 reviews, indicating "universal acclaim".

Jon Freeman of Nash Country Weekly gave the album a grade of "A" and wrote that "Jason Isbell has a reporter's eye for detail and a poet's gift for a beautifully crafted turn of phrase". He went on to say that "Jason's throaty rasp, not unlike Tyler Farr's, is the ideal vehicle for those stories [...] It may not be all pretty, but Something More Than Free is as real as it gets." Craig Manning of AbsolutePunk praised the album, writing: "Like Southeastern, Something More Than Free is a masterwork, and while I'm not sure if I quite agree with Isbell that it's better than Southeastern, it certainly offers a different (but equally satisfying) experience." In another positive review that compared the album to its predecessor, Eric Swedlund of The A.V. Club wrote that, "though Something More Than Free may not repeat Isbell's album-of-the-year accolades, it continues the magic of that breakthrough LP".

Jeremy Winograd of Slant Magazine wrote, in an otherwise positive review, that Something More Than Free "retains Southeastern's intimate acoustic-based feel and heavyhearted lyrical matter, but it's even more smooth-edged and lacks the emotional gut-punches of its predecessor." In a mixed review, Stephen Deusner of Pitchfork described Something More Than Free as "an album that contains too few surprises", and said that "the music does little to distinguish these characters or enliven the lyrics".

=== Accolades ===
Publication	Year	Accolade	Rank
Stereogum	2015	The 50 Best Albums of 2015	31
Nashville Scene	2015	16th Annual Country Music Critics' Poll	2
Rolling Stone	2015	40 Best Country Albums of 2015	1

== Commercial performance ==
In the United States, the album debuted at number 6 on the Billboard 200, and at number 1 on Billboard's Top Rock Albums, Folk Albums, and Top Country Albums charts, with 46,000 units sold. Although he had previously had critical success in the Americana genre, this was the first time one of Isbell's albums had performed so well on the charts across several genres. As of July 2016, the album had sold 143,000 copies in the U.S.

The single "24 Frames" peaked at number 8 on the Billboard Triple A Airplay chart, and at number 42 on the Rock Airplay chart.

== Track listing ==
All tracks are written by Jason Isbell.

No.	Title	Length
1.	"If It Takes a Lifetime"	3:43
2.	"24 Frames"	3:16
3.	"Flagship"	3:52
4.	"How to Forget"	4:06
5.	"Children of Children"	5:52
6.	"The Life You Chose"	4:05
7.	"Something More Than Free"	3:33
8.	"Speed Trap Town"	4:04
9.	"Hudson Commodore"	3:26
10.	"Palmetto Rose"	4:06
11.	"To a Band That I Loved"	3:52

== Personnel ==
- Jason Isbell – vocals, electric guitar, slide guitar, acoustic guitar, hi-string acoustic guitar, nylon string guitar, resonator guitar
- Dave Cobb – percussion, acoustic guitar
- Derry Deborja – piano, mellotron, organ, synthesizer, Wurlitzer
- Chad Gamble – drums
- Jimbo Hart – bass guitar
- Amanda Shires – fiddle, strings, harmony vocals
- Sadler Vaden – electric guitar, background vocals

== Charts ==
=== Weekly charts ===
Chart (2015)	Peak position
Australian Albums (ARIA)	32
Belgian Albums (Ultratop Flanders)	83
Irish Albums (IRMA)	48
Swedish Albums (Sverigetopplistan)	33
UK Albums (OCC)	17
US Billboard 200	6
US Top Country Albums (Billboard)	1
US Americana/Folk Albums (Billboard)	1
US Independent Albums (Billboard)	2
US Top Rock Albums (Billboard)	1

=== Year-end charts ===
Chart (2015)	Position
US Top Country Albums (Billboard)	38
US Folk Albums (Billboard)	11
US Top Rock Albums (Billboard)	43

Chart (2016)	Position
US Top Country Albums (Billboard)	63
