= Morgan Wade =

American singer-songwriter

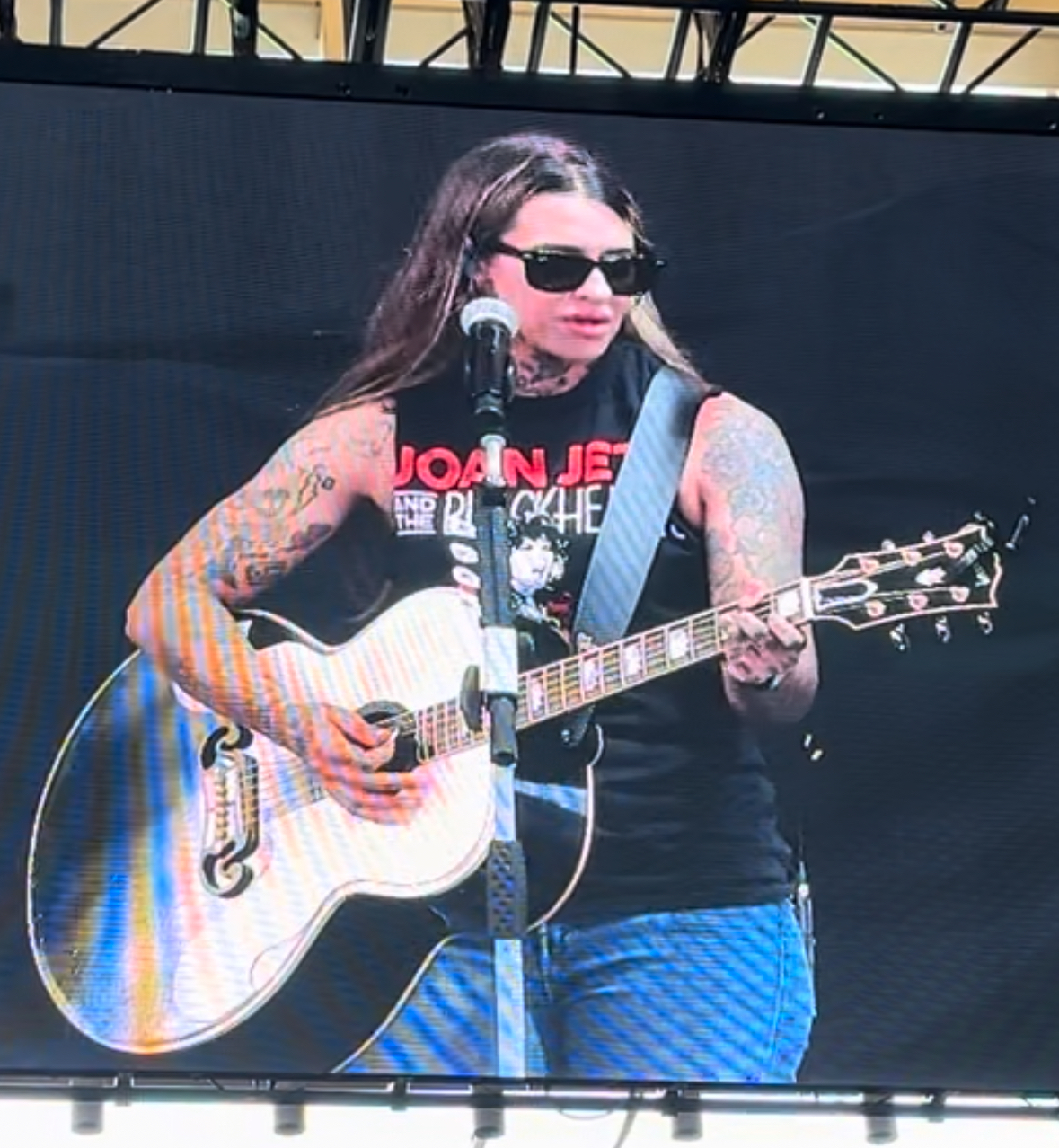
- Morgan Wade, July 2024, Noblesville, Indiana

Background information
- Born: Morgan Dealie Wade; December 10, 1994 (age 31); Floyd, Virginia, U.S.
- Genre: Country
- Occupations: Singer; songwriter
- Instruments: Vocals, guitar
- Years active: 2018–present
- Labels: Thirty Tigers; Arista Nashville; RCA Nashville; Sony; Ladylike; Warner Records
- Website: www.morganwademusic.com

Morgan Dealie Wade (born December 10, 1994) is an American country music singer and songwriter. She has released five albums: Puppets with My Heart (2018), Reckless (2021), Psychopath (2023), Obsessed (2024) and The Party Is Over (Recovered) (2025).

== Biography ==
=== Early life ===
Morgan Wade is a native of Floyd, Virginia. Her parents divorced when she was 5 years old and she spent a lot of time with her grandparents, who took her to local bluegrass music events. In 2016, she graduated from Jefferson College of Health Sciences in Roanoke, Virginia with a bachelors in exercise science and a minor in public health.

=== Early career ===
As a freshman in college, she was inspired to write songs after breaking up with her boyfriend. She recruited musicians through Craigslist to record her first album, Puppets with My Heart, released in January 2018 under the band name Morgan Wade & The Stepbrothers.

In July 2018, Wade performed at FloydFest, where Jason Isbell's sound engineer gave her album to Sadler Vaden, the guitarist in Isbell's band the 400 Unit.

=== Reckless (2021–2022) ===
Sadler Vaden and producer Paul Ebersold then helped her assemble Reckless; the album was released via the Thirty Tigers label in 2021. Reckless sold 3,000 copies in its first week and charted at number 14 on the Billboard Top Heatseekers charts. Wade said that the album was inspired by her struggles with her mental health, past relationships, and sobriety. Rolling Stone wrote that Wade has "the ragged edge of a singer-songwriter who’s been putting her nose to the grindstone for some time. In a voice like worn leather, Wade describes desperate, spontaneous relationships that feel the strongest when they’re at their breaking point."

"Wilder Days" was released to radio in 2021 as the album's first single. Billy Dukes of Taste of Country described Wade's vocal presence on the song as a "hardened Sheryl Crow" and called the song "complex, with chords and a melancholy shuffle that shouts heartbreak, even if her story is at worst hesitant and thoughtful."

In January 2022, Wade released "Run".

The deluxe edition of Reckless was released on January 28, 2022, via Arista Nashville. It included six bonus tracks, including a cover of Elvis Presley's 1969 hit "Suspicious Minds".

=== Psychopath and Obsessed (2023–present) ===
On May 19, 2023, Wade released a song titled "Psychopath," the lead single to her third album of the same name, released in August 2023. On July 10, she released a second single "80's Movies" followed by the third single entitled "Fall in Love with Me" which was released on August 4.

On March 1, 2024, Wade released "2AM in London," the lead single to her fourth album Obsessed. On April 12, the second titled "Time to Love, Time to Kill" was released. Along with release of the single, Wade announced Obsessed, released in August 2024.

On August 1, 2025, Wade released The Party Is Over (recovered), which offers both new work and demos and unreleased songs.

=== Acting ===
In April 2026, it was reported that Wade was cast on Dutton Ranch as Carol, a bartender at a local bar in a recurring capacity, making her acting debut on May 15, 2026.

== Personal life ==
In March 2024, Wade proactively underwent a double mastectomy after she tested positive for the RAD5ID gene, which, along with a family history of breast cancer, put her at a greater risk. She then got breast implants.

Wade is active in powerlifting and running.

The stress of touring and recording early in her career led to her developing an alcohol addiction at age 19; however, after a night of heavy drinking in 2017 at age 22, she became sober.

Wade is good friends with Kyle Richards. Kyle appeared in Morgan Wade's 2023 music video for "Fall in Love with Me", which depicted the pair as lovers.

== Tours ==
=== Opening act ===
- With Lucero (2021)
- "The Triple Moon Tour" with Alanis Morissette (2024)
- With Shinedown (2025)

=== Headlining ===
- Psychopath (2023)
- Crossing Province Lines (2025)

== Discography ==
Morgan Wade discography
- Studio albums: 3
- EPs: 2
- Singles: 12
- Music videos: 7

=== Albums ===
Title	Album details	Peak positions		
Title	Album details	US Heat.	US Country	US Folk
Puppets with My Heart	Release date: 2018; Label: Self-released	—	—	—
Reckless	Release date: March 19, 2021; Label: Thirty Tigers, Arista Nashville	2	30	8
Psychopath	Release date: August 25, 2023; Label: RCA Nashville, Ladylike	6	45	—
Obsessed	Release date: August 16, 2024; Label: RCA Nashville, Ladylike	10	—	—
The Party Is Over (recovered)	Release date: August 1, 2025; Label: RCA Nashville, Ladylike	—	—	—

=== Extended plays ===
Title	Details
OurVinyl Sessions	Release date: June 18, 2020; Label: OurVinyl
Acoustic Sessions EP	Release date: August 12, 2022; Label: Sony, LadyLike

=== Singles ===
Year	Title	Peak positions		Certifications	Album
Year	Title	US Country	US Country Airplay	Certifications	Album
2019	"The Night"	—	—		
2021	"Wilder Days"	36	29	RIAA: Platinum	Reckless
2021	"I'll Be Home for Christmas"	—	—		Non-album singles
2021	"Santa Claus Is Back in Town"	—	—		Non-album singles
2022	"Run"	—	—		Non-album singles
2022	"The Night Part 1 & 2"	—	—		Non-album singles
2023	"Psychopath"	—	—		Psychopath
2023	"80's Movie"	—	—		Psychopath
2023	"Fall in Love with Me"	—	—		Psychopath
2023	"Halloween"	—	—		Non-album single
2024	"2AM in London"	—	—		Obsessed
2024	"Time to Love, Time to Kill"	—	—		Obsessed
2025	"East Coast"	—	—		The Party Is Over
2025	"The Party Is Over"	—	—		The Party Is Over

=== Music videos ===
Year	Title	Album
2021	"Wilder Days"	Reckless
2022	"Run"	Reckless (Deluxe Edition)
2022	"Take Me Away"	Reckless (Deluxe Edition)
2023	"The Night"	Reckless (Deluxe Edition)
2023	"The Night (Part 2)"	The Night Part 1 & 2 (Note: The Night Part 1 & 2 is the name of a two-song single.)
2023	"80's Movie"	Psychopath
2023	"Fall in Love with Me"	Psychopath

== Awards and nominations ==
Morgan awards and nominations
Awards and nominations
Award	Wins	Nominations
Academy of Country Music Awards	0	1
Americana Music Honors & Awards	0	1

Totals (Note: Certain award groups do not simply award one winner. They acknowledge several different recipients, have runners-up, and have third place. Since this is a specific recognition and is different from losing an award, runner-up mentions are considered wins in this award tally. For simplification and to avoid errors, each award in this list has been presumed to have had a prior nomination.)
- Wins: 0
- Nominations: 2

Year	Organization	Award	Nominee/Work	Result
2022	Americana Music Honors & Awards	Emerging Act of the Year	Morgan Wade	Nominated
2023	Academy of Country Music Awards	New Female Artist of the Year	Morgan Wade	Nominated
