= Derry deBorja =

- Born: Baltimore, Maryland, U.S.
- Origin: Washington, D.C., U.S.
- Genres: Americana; Rock
- Instrument(s): Keyboard, Accordion, Synth, Mellotron
- Years active: 2005-present
- Member of: Jason Isbell and the 400 Unit
- Formerly of: Son Volt

Derry deBorja is a keyboardist, songwriter, composer, and producer best known as a member of Jason Isbell's band, the 400 Unit.

== Biography ==
deBorja is a Baltimore native and started his musical career in Washington, D.C. as keyboardist for the Americana band Canyon, where he met Uncle Tupelo/Son Volt founder Jay Farrar. After meeting Farrar, he joined Son Volt in 2005 and contributed to their 2007 album, The Search.

deBorja joined Jason Isbell and The 400 Unit in 2007. He has won 2 Grammys for his contributions to Isbell's albums, The Nashville Sound and Weathervanes.

deBorja has also contributed to recent recordings by Morgan Wade, Bahamas, Joe Pug, Josh Ritter, and Ian Noe.

== Discography ==
Artist	Title	Label	Year
Canyon	Canyon	Slowdime Records	2001
Son Volt	Okemah and the Melody of Riot	Transmit Sounds	2005
Son Volt	The Search	Transmit Sounds	2007
Jason Isbell and the 400 Unit	Here We Rest	Lightning Rod Records	2011
Jason Isbell	Southeastern	Southeastern Records	2013
Jason Isbell	Something More Than Free	Southeastern Records	2015
Sadler Vaden	Sadler Vaden	Glass Jaw Records	2016
Jason Isbell and the 400 Unit	The Nashville Sound	Southeastern Records	2017
Jason Isbell and the 400 Unit	Live From The Ryman	Southeastern Records	2018
Josh Ritter	Fever Breaks	Pytheas Recordings	2019
Sadler Vaden	Anybody Out There?	Dirty Mag Records	2020
Jason Isbell and the 400 Unit	Reunions	Southeastern Records	2020
Morgan Wade	Reckless	Ladylike Records	2021
Joe Pug	Nation of Heat | Revisited	Nation of Heat Records	2022
Ian Noe	River Fools and Mountain Saints	Thirty Tigers	2023
Jason Isbell and the 400 Unit	Weathervanes	Southeastern Records	2023
Morgan Wade	Psychopath	Sony Music Nashville	2023
