= Sirens of the Ditch =

Studio album by Jason Isbell
- Released: July 10, 2007
- Recorded: 2003–2007
- Studio: FAME Studios (Florence, Alabama)
- Genre: rock, alternative country
- Length: 50:16
- Label: New West Records (2007)
- Producer: Jason Isbell, Patterson Hood

Jason Isbell chronology
| Sirens of the Ditch (2007) | Jason Isbell and the 400 Unit (2009) |

Professional ratings
Aggregate scores
| Source | Rating |
|---|---|
| Metacritic | 78/100 |
Review scores
| Source | Rating |
| AllMusic | 4/5 stars |
| The A.V. Club | A− |
| Entertainment Weekly | A− |
| Pitchfork | 7.4/10 |
| PopMatters | 7/10 stars |

Sirens of the Ditch is the debut solo album released by singer-songwriter and former Drive-By Truckers lead guitarist, Jason Isbell. The album was released on July 10, 2007.

After leaving Drive-By Truckers amicably in 2007, Isbell released Sirens of the Ditch on New West Records. Sirens of the Ditch was recorded at FAME Studios, where among the musicians helping to record the album was Patterson Hood of Drive by Truckers and Spooner Oldham, famous for his work with Aretha Franklin and Neil Young. According to Washington Post writer Catherine Lewis, Sirens of the Ditch has "a more bluesy pop sound" than Isbell's work with Drive-By Truckers. The first single from the album, "Brand New Kind of Actress," deals with the death of Lana Clarkson in Phil Spector's mansion. Another single, "Dress Blues," concerns the death of Corporal Matthew Conley, a US Marine from Isbell's hometown who was killed in the Iraq War. "Dress Blues" was also recorded by the Zac Brown Band (featuring Jewel), on their April 2015 release, Jekyll + Hyde.

The album was re-released on July 13, 2018. Titled Sirens of the Ditch: Deluxe Edition, the album features four previously unreleased songs.

== Track listing ==
| No. | Title | Length |
|---|---|---|
| 1. | "Brand New Kind of Actress" | 5:35 |
| 2. | "Down in a Hole" | 4:22 |
| 3. | "Try" | 4:52 |
| 4. | "Chicago Promenade" | 3:23 |
| 5. | "Dress Blues" | 4:11 |
| 6. | "Grown" | 3:46 |
| 7. | "Hurricanes and Hand Grenades" | 5:11 |
| 8. | "In a Razor Town" | 3:19 |
| 9. | "Shotgun Wedding" | 3:49 |
| 10. | "The Magician" | 4:20 |
| 11. | "The Devil Is My Running Mate" | 3:45 |

Deluxe Edition
| No. | Title | Length |
|---|---|---|
| 12. | "Whisper" | 4:41 |
| 13. | "Crystal Clear" | 5:02 |
| 14. | "The Assassin" | 3:40 |
| 15. | "Racetrack Romeo" | 5:00 |

== Personnel ==
- David Barbe – keyboards
- Mike Dillon, Brad Morgan – drums
- David Hood – bass guitar
- Patterson Hood – acoustic guitar, electric guitar
- Jason Isbell – banjo, bass guitar, dobro, acoustic guitar, electric guitar, Hammond organ, piano, lead vocals, background vocals, Wurlitzer
- Clay Leverett – background vocals
- John Neff – pedal steel guitar
- Spooner Oldham – Hammond organ
- Shonna Tucker – bass guitar, background vocals
