= The Nashville Sound =

Studio album by Jason Isbell and the 400 Unit
- Released: June 16, 2017
- Studios: RCA Studio A (Nashville, Tennessee)
- Genres: Americana, alternative country
- Length: 40:17
- Label: Southeastern
- Producer: Dave Cobb

Jason Isbell and the 400 Unit chronology
Something More Than Free (2015)	The Nashville Sound (2017)	Reunions (2020)

The Nashville Sound is the sixth studio album by Jason Isbell, and the third credited to "Jason Isbell and the 400 Unit" (the first since Here We Rest in 2011). It was released on June 16, 2017. The album was produced by Dave Cobb, who had produced Isbell's previous two albums: Southeastern (2013) and Something More Than Free (2015). At the 60th Annual Grammy Awards, the album won the award for Best Americana Album, and the song "If We Were Vampires" won the award for Best American Roots Song.

== Reception ==
Professional ratings
Aggregate scores
Source	Rating
AnyDecentMusic?	7.9/10
Metacritic	82/100
Review scores
Source	Rating
AllMusic	4/5 stars
American Songwriter	4.5/5 stars
The A.V. Club	B+
The Independent	4/5 stars
Mojo	4/5 stars
Pitchfork	6.3/10
Record Collector	4/5 stars
Rolling Stone	3.5/5 stars
Uncut	9/10
Vice	A

The album earned Isbell his first CMA Award nomination, which was for Album of the Year at the 2017 ceremony. It won Best Americana Album at the 60th Annual Grammy Awards, and International Album of the Year at the 2018 UK Americana Awards. Additionally, "If We Were Vampires" won the Grammy for Best American Roots Song.

=== Accolades ===
Publication	Year	Accolade	Rank	Ref.
Rolling Stone	2017	50 Best Albums of 2017	21	
Stereogum	2017	The 50 Best Albums of 2017	49	
Uncut	2017	Albums of the Year	72	
Exclaim!	2017	Top 10 Folk and Country Albums of 2017	4	

=== Commercial performance ===
In the United States, the album debuted at number 4 on the Billboard 200 with 54,000 album-equivalent units, of which 51,000 were pure album sales. It is Isbell's highest placement on that chart, besting Something More Than Free, which peaked at number 6 in 2015. As of December 2018, the album had sold 152,500 copies in the U.S.

The single "If We Were Vampires" peaked at number 29 on the Billboard Triple A Airplay chart.

== Track listing ==
All tracks are written by Jason Isbell, except where noted.

No.	Title	Length
1.	"Last of My Kind"	4:22
2.	"Cumberland Gap"	3:24
3.	"Tupelo"	4:01
4.	"White Man's World"	3:56
5.	"If We Were Vampires"	3:35
6.	"Anxiety" (Isbell, Amanda Shires)	6:57
7.	"Molotov"	3:46
8.	"Chaos and Clothes"	3:34
9.	"Hope the High Road"	3:03
10.	"Something to Love"	3:39

== Personnel ==
Credits adapted from AllMusic.

The 400 Unit

- Jason Isbell – lead vocals, harmony vocals, acoustic guitar, electric guitar
- Derry Deborja – keyboard, Therevox, photography
- Chad Gamble – drums
- Jimbo Hart – bass
- Amanda Shires – harmony vocals, fiddle, photography
- Sadler Vaden – electric guitar

Production and design

- Danny Clinch – photography
- Dave Cobb – producer, acoustic guitar, percussion
- Gena Johnson – assistant engineer
- Peter Lyman – mastering
- Matt Ross-Spang – engineer
- Tracie Thomas – art direction

== Charts ==
=== Weekly charts ===
Chart (2017)	Peak position
Australian Albums (ARIA)	30
Belgian Albums (Ultratop Flanders)	48
Belgian Albums (Ultratop Wallonia)	198
Canadian Albums (Billboard)	24
Dutch Albums (Album Top 100)	39
Irish Albums (IRMA)	61
New Zealand Heatseekers Albums (RMNZ)	5
Norwegian Albums (VG-lista)	20
Scottish Albums (Official Charts)	13
Swedish Albums (Sverigetopplistan)	35
Swiss Albums (Schweizer Hitparade)	54
UK Albums (Official Charts)	26
US Billboard 200	4
US Americana/Folk Albums (Billboard)	1
US Independent Albums (Billboard)	1
US Top Country Albums (Billboard)	1
US Top Rock Albums (Billboard)	1

=== Year-end charts ===
Chart (2017)	Position
US Top Country Albums (Billboard)	50
US Top Rock Albums (Billboard)	54
