= Southeastern (album) =

Studio album by Jason Isbell
- Released: June 11, 2013
- Genres: Alternative country; Americana
- Length: 47:18
- Label: Southeastern
- Producer: Dave Cobb

Jason Isbell chronology
Here We Rest (2011)	Southeastern (2013)	Something More Than Free (2015)

Professional ratings
Aggregate scores
Source	Rating
AnyDecentMusic?	8.1/10
Metacritic	87/100
Review scores
Source	Rating
AllMusic	4/5 stars
American Songwriter	4.5/5 stars
The A.V. Club	A−
The Independent	4/5 stars
Mojo	4/5 stars
Paste	9.0/10
Pitchfork	7.7/10
Rolling Stone	3.5/4 stars
Spin	8/10
Uncut	8/10

Southeastern is the fourth studio album by American singer-songwriter Jason Isbell, released on June 11, 2013 on Southeastern Records. Initially set to be produced by Isbell's friend and touring companion Ryan Adams, the album was recorded following a stint in rehab, with Isbell noting, "This time I want to remember it all." Produced by Dave Cobb, the album was released to widespread critical acclaim. In 2020, the album was ranked at 458 on Rolling Stone's 500 Greatest Albums of All Time list.

In 2023, Isbell re-released the album as a deluxe edition with an updated album cover, a remaster of the original album, demos, and a live performance of the album from a December 2022 show at the Bijou Theatre in Knoxville, Tennessee.

== Background and recording ==
The album was recorded without the full participation of Jason Isbell's regular backing band The 400 Unit, with Isbell noting: "It really came to the nature of the songs more than anything else. It's a very personal record for me. And I had gone into the studio with the intention of making more of a solo, acoustic album. But Dave [Cobb], the producer, and I both sort of got bored with that idea and we decided to bring a band in for some things." The 400 Unit band members Chad Gamble and Derry deBorja appear on drums and keyboards, respectively.

Ryan Adams was originally the album's producer, but Adams suddenly backed out of the agreement after Isbell sent him the first demos for the album. Isbell believes that Adams was "intimidated" by the quality of the music, after first thinking that Adams was disappointed.

Producer Dave Cobb encouraged Isbell to record his vocals in one take: "I think the big difference is that during the process we kept a lot of live vocal takes and I've not done that in the past. I was sort of terrified, really. Before, we'd spend a couple days at the end of the sessions tuning everything. Dave Cobb really encouraged me to sing with the live tracks while we were recording it."

Isbell finished recording Southeastern one or two days before his wedding to musician Amanda Shires, saying he "even went back and did some final touches on Sunday after the wedding before we went on our honeymoon.

On the title, Isbell said that geography "wasn't actually the reason I named the album that. That came from a tool and die shop in Alabama that my dad worked at when I was very young. He came home with terrible stories; I thought of the place as a dungeon. So I wanted to reclaim that for my own purposes."

== Writing and composition ==
The album's title stems from Isbell's childhood, with Isbell stating, "My dad used to work for a tool-and-die shop when I was a kid that was called Southeastern and that's how it originally occurred to me. I had moved from Muscle Shoals to Nashville – almost a year ago now — and it struck me that, at this point in my life, I don't have any interest in living in any other part of the country or the world, really."

The album's fourth track, "Elephant", focuses upon cancer, with Isbell stating: "It's something that everyone has had an experience with, or they will have. It can be difficult, but it's supposed to be. You're supposed to give enough of a damn about the songs you're singing that you might get a little choked up a little during one of 'em."

The album's tenth track, "Super 8," reflects on the humor that comes with sobriety, with Isbell saying: "There’s more to the human experience than the other songs on that album represent. Thematically, it’s important to represent the humor in addiction and recovery, and the humor that happens when you open yourself up and make yourself vulnerable to the people that you care about — and to your audience.”

The track "Yvette", which deals with sexual abuse, is a companion piece to the track, "Daisy Mae", on Isbell's previous studio album, Here We Rest (2011). He notes, "I got to a point, I guess when I was probably thirty, or thirty-one years old, where it occurred to me almost everyone you meet was sexually abused as a kid, almost everybody, by someone. That never happened to me, believe it or not, but the percentages are just staggering, and writing a song about something that's that depressing I think it's good to discuss it. Some people like to discuss those things, maybe they don't want to start the conversation themselves, but sometimes those things help folks to relate and get those things out of their system a little bit."

== Commercial performance ==
The album debuted at No. 23 on the Billboard 200, and No. 7 on the Top Rock Albums chart, selling 18,000 copies in its first week. It has sold 148,000 copies in the United States as of June 2015.

== Track listing ==
All tracks are written by Jason Isbell.

No.	Title	Length
1.	"Cover Me Up"	4:51
2.	"Stockholm"	2:49
3.	"Traveling Alone"	4:27
4.	"Elephant"	3:37
5.	"Flying Over Water"	3:58
6.	"Different Days"	3:34
7.	"Live Oak"	3:35
8.	"Songs That She Sang in the Shower"	3:56
9.	"New South Wales"	3:53
10.	"Super 8"	3:25
11.	"Yvette"	4:28
12.	"Relatively Easy"	4:45

iTunes bonus tracks
No.	Title	Length
13.	"Elephant" (demo)	3:57
14.	"Traveling Alone" (demo)	4:01

== Personnel ==
Primary musicians

- Jason Isbell – vocals, guitar
- Brian Allen – bass guitar
- Chad Gamble – drums
- Derry deBorja – keyboards, mellotron
- Dave Cobb – percussion

Additional musicians

- Kim Richey – vocals (2, 12)
- Amanda Shires – fiddle and vocals (3, 9)
- Paul Griffith – drums (3)
- Will Johnson – vocals (10)

Recording personnel

- Dave Cobb – producer
- Mark Petaccia – engineer, mixing
- Pete Lyman – mastering
- Bill Satcher – runner
- John Michael Brady – drum tech

Artwork

- Chris Kro – art direction
- Michael Wilson – photography

== Charts ==
Chart (2013)	Peak position
US Billboard 200	23
US Independent Albums (Billboard)	5
US Top Rock Albums (Billboard)	7
US Indie Store Album Sales (Billboard)	5

== Certifications ==
Certifications for Southeastern
Region	Certification	Certified units/sales
United States (RIAA)	Gold	500,000^{‡}
^{‡} Sales+streaming figures based on certification alone.
