= Here We Rest =

Studio album by Jason Isbell and The 400 Unit
- Released: April 12, 2011
- Genres: Country, blues
- Length: 39:38
- Label: Lightning Rod Records
- Producers: Jason Isbell and the 400 Unit

Jason Isbell and The 400 Unit chronology
| Jason Isbell and The 400 Unit (2009) | Here We Rest (2011) | Southeastern (2013) |

Here We Rest is the third studio album by American musician Jason Isbell, and the second credited to "Jason Isbell and the 400 Unit". It was released on April 12, 2011. On October 18, 2019, the album was re-released with remixing done by Dave Cobb and remastering done by Pete Lyman.

== Critical reception ==
Professional ratings
Aggregate scores
| Source | Rating |
|---|---|
| Metacritic | 76/100 |
Review scores
| Source | Rating |
| AllMusic | ) |
| Boston Phoenix | ) |
| Robert Christgau | (2-star Honorable Mention) |
| Pitchfork Media | (6.0/10) |

The album received a Metacritic score of 76 based on 15 reviews, indicating generally favorable reviews. Andrew Leahey of AllMusic found that the songs in the album had captured "archetypal characters that populate most struggling Southern towns" with a "sympathetic soundtrack of folk, country, and bar band rock & roll", one that is "bittersweet, but there’s an air of resilience". Zeth Lundy of Boston Phoenix thought that Isbell had settled into his "comfortable post-Truckers solo-artist groove," and that his voice "is now smoother, older yet less weathered." Nick Coleman of Independent on Sunday however felt that what kept the album from becoming an impressive album is "the slightness of [Isbell's] voice – and his band".

== Track listing ==
| No. | Title | Length |
|---|---|---|
| 1. | "Alabama Pines" | 3:49 |
| 2. | "Go It Alone" | 4:27 |
| 3. | "We've Met" | 3:08 |
| 4. | "Codeine" | 5:36 |
| 5. | "Stopping By" | 4:09 |
| 6. | "Daisy Mae" | 2:53 |
| 7. | "The Ballad of Nobeard" | 0:27 |
| 8. | "Never Could Believe" | 4:06 |
| 9. | "Heart on a String" | 3:49 |
| 10. | "Save It For Sunday" | 3:49 |
| 11. | "Tour of Duty" | 3:29 |

"Go It Alone" was used in Sons of Anarchy Season 4 episode "Booster." "Alabama Pines" won Song of the Year at the 2012 Americana Music Awards.

== Personnel ==
- Jason Isbell - lead vocal, lead and rhythm guitars, piano, organ
- Jimbo Hart - electric bass, upright bass, backup vocals
- Browan Lollar - lead and rhythm guitar, backup vocals
- Derry deBorja - piano, organ, accordion, backup vocals
- Chad Gamble - drums, percussion, backup vocals

Special Guests

- Abby Owens - harmony vocals
- Amanda Shires - harmony vocals, fiddle

== Cover art ==
- Browan Lollar
