= Sadler Vaden =

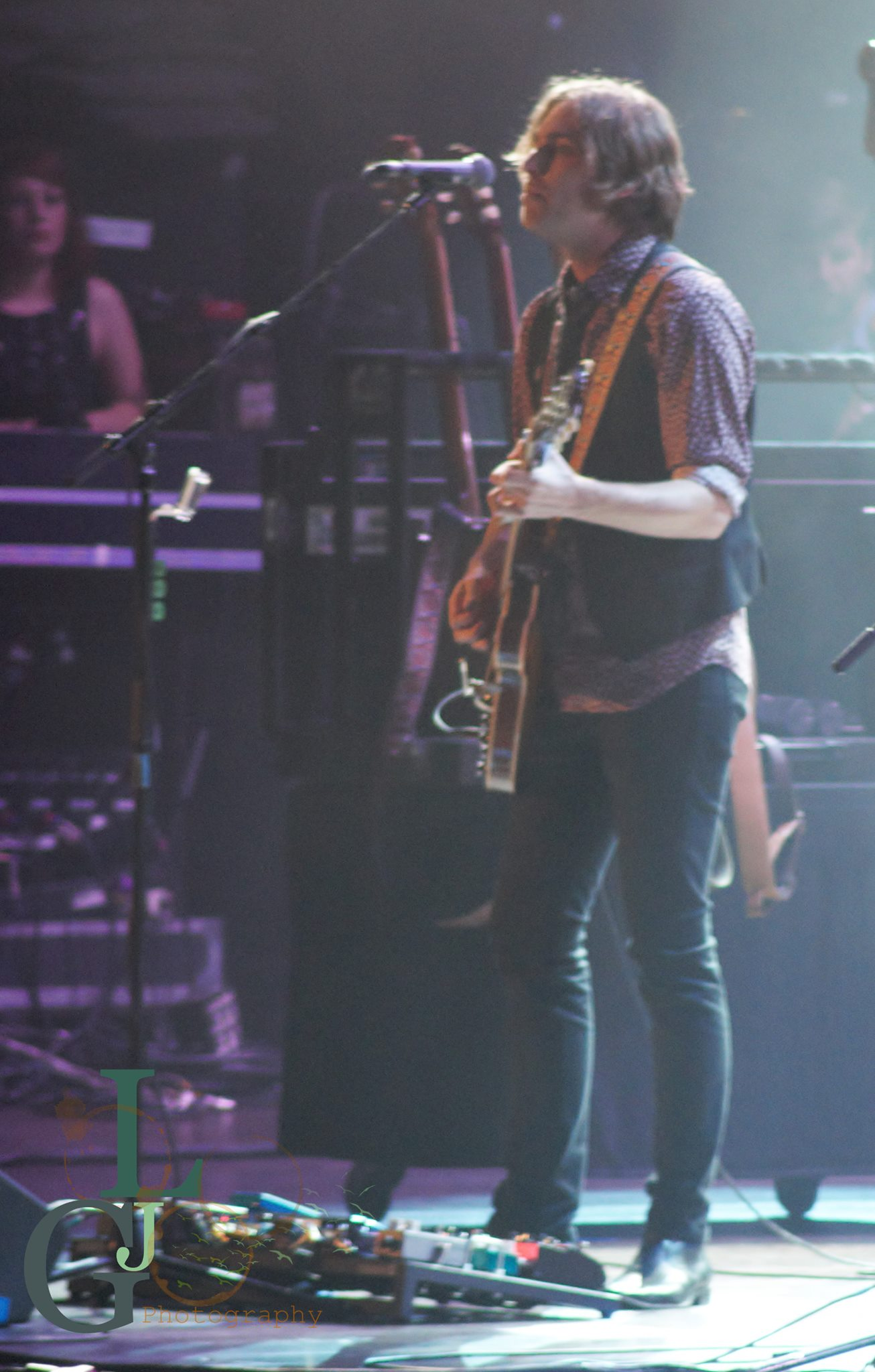

Background information
- Born: February 19, 1986 (age 40); Charlotte, North Carolina, U.S.
- Genres: Americana; alt-country; folk; Southern rock; roots rock
- Occupation: Musician
- Instruments: Guitar, vocals
- Years active: 2011–present
- Member of: The 400 Unit
- Formerly of: Drivin N Cryin

Sadler Vaden (born February 19, 1986) is an American guitarist, singer, songwriter and producer, best known as a member of Jason Isbell's band, The 400 Unit.

== Biography ==
Sadler Vaden was born on February 19, 1986, in Charlotte, North Carolina. He and his family moved to North Myrtle Beach, South Carolina when he was one and to Charleston, South Carolina. when he was twelve. When Sadler was eighteen, his father died of alcoholism and on his twenty-first birthday, his mother died as a result of breast cancer.

Sadler is married to his wife, Candice. They gave birth to their first son, Townsend (after Pete Townshend of The Who) in 2020. They welcomed their second son, Theodore Sadler Vaden, on December 27, 2023.

== Career ==
Vaden was first captivated by the guitar when his father took him to see Farm Aid in Columbia, South Carolina in 1996. He was particularly impressed with Neil Young and Crazy Horse. When they got home, his father produced a guitar and showed Vaden some of the rudiments of the instrument. Vaden began playing the guitar when he was a teenager and started his first band, a power trio called Leslie when he was eighteen. Vaden and band opened for a number of national and regional artists, including Drivin N Cryin and Jason Isbell. Vaden joined Drivin N Cryin as a guitar player in 2011. He produced the bands' series of Songs EPs. In 2013, he was hired by Jason Isbell to become guitarist for Isbell's band, The 400 Unit. He has since appeared on all of their albums as of 2023, including 2017's The Nashville Sound, which won the Grammy for Best Americana Album.

His major influences include Oasis, George Harrison, Tom Petty and The Who.

Vaden has also released his own albums, starting with the self-titled Sadler Vaden for Glass Jaw Records in 2016. This was followed by Anybody Out There in 2020, which Vaden referred to as his "finest work to date" and No Depression magazine described as "a rock and roll masterpiece". He also released two live efforts in 2020, Live at the Mercy Lounge and Live at the High Watt. In September 2020, he appeared in an episode of the Guitar Player mini-documentary series My Life In Five Riffs. He discussed and performed parts of John Mellencamp's "Pink Houses"; Neil Young's "Hey Hey My My (Into the Black)"; "And Your Bird Can Sing" by The Beatles; "Substitute" by The Who; and Angus Young's solo in AC/DC's "You Shook Me All Night Long."

In 2021, he produced the highly acclaimed debut album for Morgan Wade, Reckless, as well as playing guitar on that record. In 2022, he produced Blue Dogs album Big Dreamers.

In August of 2024, Vaden released the album "Dad Rock".

== Discography ==
Artist	Title	Label	Year
Jason Isbell	Southeastern	Southeastern Records	2013
Jason Isbell	Something More Than Free	Southeastern Records	2015
Sadler Vaden	Sadler Vaden	Glass Jaw Records	2016
Jason Isbell and the 400 Unit	The Nashville Sound	Southeastern Records	2017
Jason Isbell and the 400 Unit	Live From The Ryman	Southeastern Records	2018
Sadler Vaden	Anybody Out There	Dirty Mag Records	2020
Sadler Vaden	Live At The Mercy Lounge	Self released	2020
Sadler Vaden	Live At The High Watt	Self released	2020
Jason Isbell and the 400 Unit	Reunions	Southeastern Records	2020
Morgan Wade	Reckless	Ladylike Records	2021
Jason Isbell and the 400 Unit	Weathervanes	Southeastern Records	2023
Morgan Wade	Psychopath	Sony Music Nashville	2023
Sadler Vaden	Dad Rock	Independent	2024
