= Jason Isbell =

American singer-songwriter (born 1979)

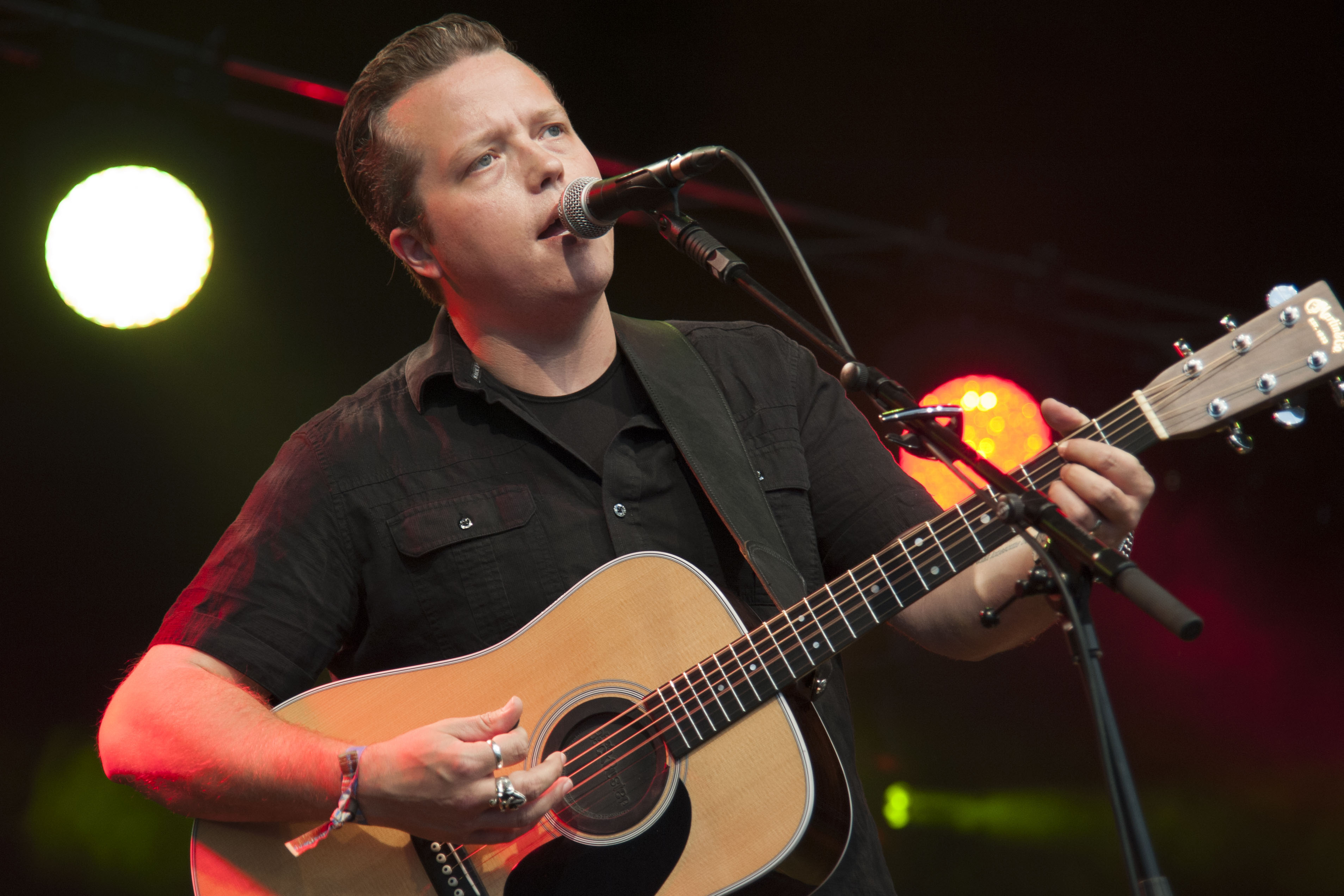
- Jason Isbell performing at the Cambridge Folk Festival, August 2014

Background information
- Born: Michael Jason Isbell; February 1, 1979 (age 47); Green Hill, Alabama, U.S.
- Genres: Country; Americana; folk; Southern rock
- Occupation: Musician
- Instruments: Vocals; guitar; piano
- Years active: 1995–present
- Labels: Lightning Rod; New West; Southeastern; Thirty Tigers
- Member of: Jason Isbell and the 400 Unit
- Formerly of: Drive-By Truckers
- Spouses: Shonna Tucker (m. 2002; div. 2007) Amanda Shires (m. 2013; div. 2025)
- Website: jasonisbell.com

Michael Jason Isbell (/ˈɪzbəl/ IZ-bəl; born February 1, 1979) is an American singer-songwriter. Considered one of the best contemporary songwriters in his genre, he is known for his honest, emotional lyrics. Isbell began his career as a member of Drive-By Truckers for six years, from 2001 to 2007. His first album with his backing band, the 400 Unit, was released in 2009.

In 2013, Isbell released his solo commercial breakthrough, Southeastern, which debuted at No. 23 on the Billboard 200 and appeared on Rolling Stone's 500 Greatest Albums of All Time. The album was later certified gold. Southeastern also featured his signature song, "Cover Me Up", which won Song of the Year at the Americana Music Honors & Awards. In 2017 he released The Nashville Sound, which debuted at No. 4 and featured the Grammy-winning song "If We Were Vampires".

Isbell has earned praise from artists such as John Mayer, Bruce Springsteen, David Crosby, and Zach Bryan. He has won six Grammy Awards out of ten nominations.

As an actor, Isbell has appeared in roles in the television series Squidbillies and Billions, as well as the films Deadwood: The Movie and Killers of the Flower Moon.

His most recent album with the 400 Unit, Weathervanes, was released in June 2023. His most recent solo album, Foxes in the Snow, was released in March 2025.

== Early life ==
Isbell was born in Green Hill, Alabama, two miles (3 km) from the Alabama/Tennessee state line, the son of interior designer Angela Hill Barnett and house painter Mike Isbell. Isbell's mother was only 17 years old (and his father 19 years old) when he was born and is the subject of a song, "Children of Children". Isbell's parents divorced, and he has two much younger half-siblings.

Isbell grew up in North Alabama. His grandparents lived on a farm down the road next to the school that Isbell attended; they looked after him while his parents were at work. His grandfather and uncle taught him to play various instruments, including the mandolin when he was six years old, as it was easier for him to grip as a small child. They enjoyed gospel music, bluegrass music, and the Grand Ole Opry. In high school, he played trumpet and French horn. Isbell's family would get together and play music every week, sometimes twice a week. Isbell's paternal grandfather, who came from a musical family, was a Pentecostal preacher and played guitar in church. Isbell spent his childhood attending both the Pentecostal church and the stricter Church of Christ, which permitted only singing without musical instruments.

Isbell started playing in a garage band and a country cover band when he was 14 or 15 years old with his friend, songwriter Chris Tompkins. They played at the Grand Ole Opry when Isbell was 16.

Isbell attended the University of Memphis, studying English and creative writing. He dropped out, being short one credit, to go on tour. In September 2023, after discussions with the University of Memphis about his career experience, he was awarded his bachelor's degree in English.

== Career ==
When Isbell was a teenager, many musicians took him under their wing. He got to know session bassist David Hood, father of Drive-By Truckers co-founder Patterson Hood, because David Hood was in the Florence, Alabama area and played around town on Friday and Saturday nights in local restaurants and bars. By this time, Patterson Hood and his future Drive-By Truckers co-founder, Mike Cooley, were older and had moved out of town. Isbell would go watch David Hood and others perform. After he eventually found the nerve to tell them he played the guitar, they invited him to join them onstage, which resulted in friendship and mentorship.

Isbell submitted demos and eventually got a publishing deal with FAME Studios of Muscle Shoals, Alabama, when he was 21. He worked with FAME for 15 years, through his solo album Southeastern. Isbell also recorded pieces of his solo albums at FAME Studios, as well as the Drive-By Truckers' The Dirty South.

=== Drive-By Truckers ===
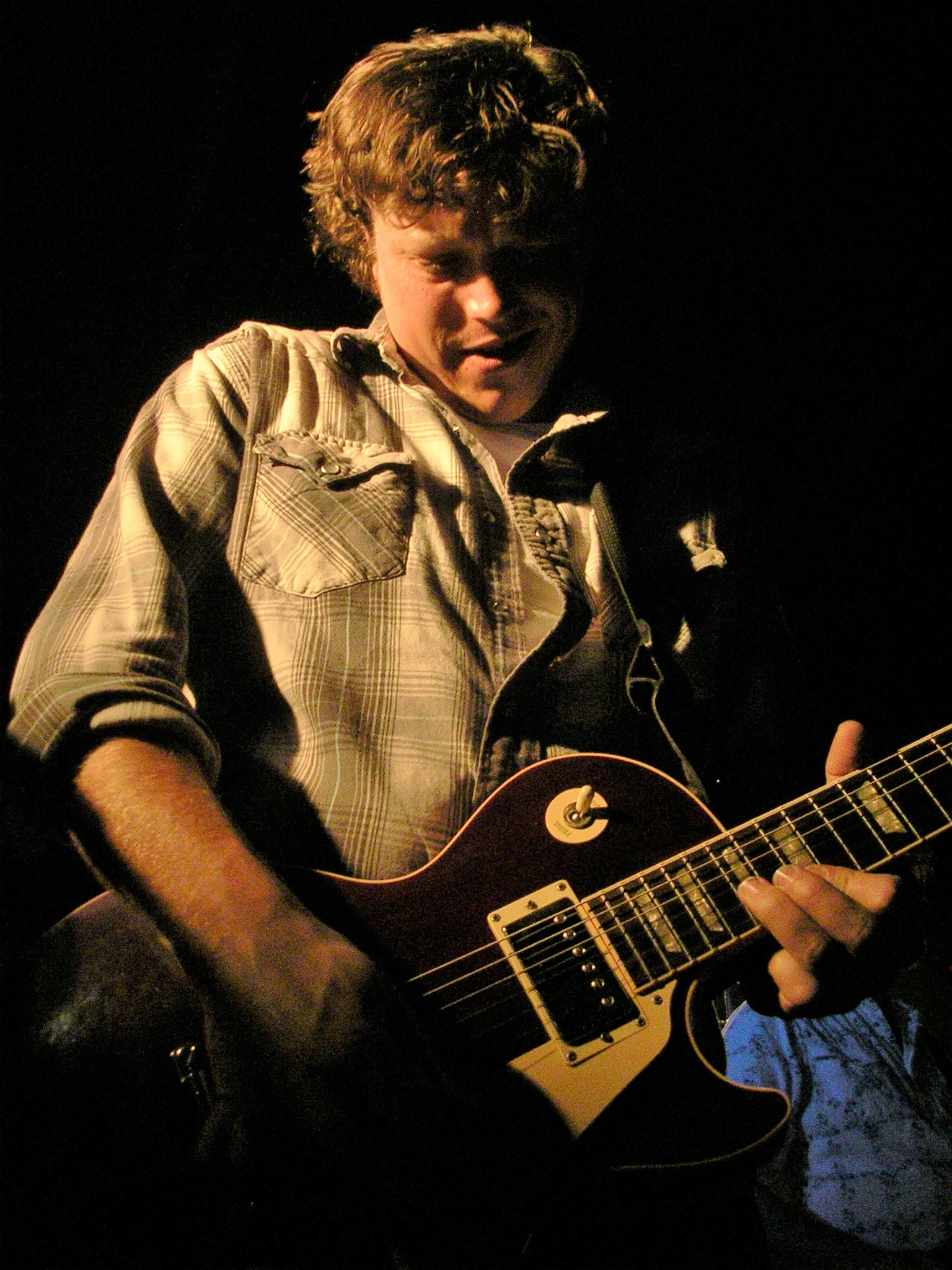
Isbell performing with the Drive-By Truckers in Auburn, Alabama, in 2005

In 2001, at age 22, Isbell joined the Drive-By Truckers while they toured in support of their album Southern Rock Opera. The band operated out of Athens, Georgia, where Isbell lived while with the band. Co-founder Patterson Hood recalls that he met Isbell through Dick Cooper, a mutual friend from Muscle Shoals. Hood invited Isbell to join the Drive-By Truckers after he sat in with the group at an acoustic house party when guitarist Rob Malone did not show up.

Isbell recorded and contributed many songs to the Drive-By Truckers for their next three albums, 2003's Decoration Day, 2004's The Dirty South, and 2006's A Blessing and a Curse. The title track of Decoration Day was revealed by Isbell in the 2014 Live from Lincoln Center concert to be a true story about his family members.

For most of his time as a band member, Isbell was married to Shonna Tucker, who joined the band after Isbell as bassist. The two were part of the band's documentary, The Secret to a Happy Ending. The two later divorced.

On April 5, 2007, Isbell announced that he was no longer a member of the Drive-By Truckers. The following day, Patterson Hood confirmed the break on the band's official site. In his letter to the fans, Hood described the parting of ways as "amicable" and expressed the hope that fans would continue to support the Drive-By Truckers as well as Isbell's solo efforts. Isbell had been with the Drive-By Truckers for six years.

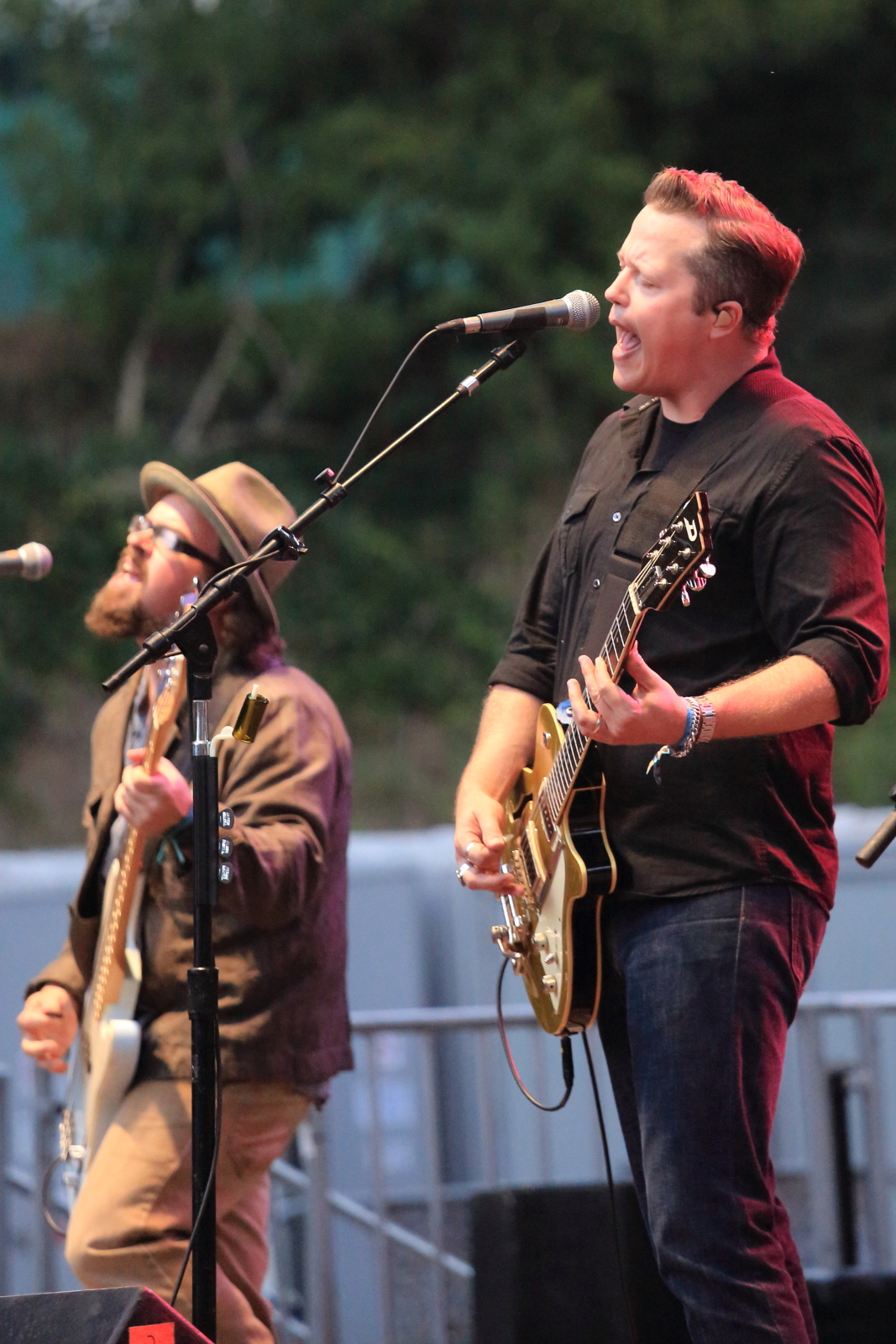
Jimbo Hart (left) and Isbell at Hardly Strictly Bluegrass in San Francisco on October 5, 2014

On June 15, 2014, Isbell teamed with Hood and Mike Cooley for a benefit at the Shoals Theater in Florence, Alabama. The sold-out acoustic performance was the first time Isbell had performed with his former bandmates since they split in 2007. In August 2015, Hood joined Isbell onstage and played a couple of Drive-By Truckers songs together in Hood's new adopted hometown of Portland, Oregon. On October 3, 2026, he reunited with the band for a one-off performance of Decoration Day at Shoals Fest in Florence, Alabama.

=== Solo work ===
Isbell released his first solo album, Sirens of the Ditch, on July 10, 2007. In 2012, Isbell supported singer-songwriter Ryan Adams on his tour. Both played solo acoustic sets.

On June 11, 2013, Isbell released his fourth solo album, Southeastern. Produced by Dave Cobb and featuring accompanying vocals by Kim Richey and Isbell's wife, Amanda Shires, Southeastern received overwhelmingly positive critical reviews, earning a score of 87 on Metacritic. Southeastern led to Isbell's clean sweep of the 2014 Americana Music Awards. Southeastern won Album of the Year, Isbell was named Artist of the Year, and the song "Cover Me Up" was named Song of the Year. It was later certified Gold by RIAA in 2022. NPR rock critic Ken Tucker listed Southeastern at No. 1 on his top ten albums of 2013. Isbell's record received praise by artists like Bruce Springsteen and John Prine. The music video for the song "Traveling Alone" features the Jackson House, a historic home in Moulton, Alabama.

Isbell's fifth solo record, Something More Than Free, was released on July 17, 2015, on Southeastern Records. Dave Cobb again produced the album, which was recorded at Nashville's Sound Emporium Studios with a full band. During the summer of 2015, Isbell was on a North American tour to promote the album, with four consecutive sold-out nights at the Ryman Auditorium in Nashville at the end of October. In April 2016, Isbell appeared on the BBC live-music show Later With Jools Holland, singing "The Life You Chose", one of the tracks from Something More Than Free.

Isbell said that compared to Southeastern, Something More Than Free has a feeling of celebration, which reflects his upcoming fatherhood and a forward-facing momentum. One track on the record, "To a Band I Loved", is a love-letter to the band Centro-Matic, a now defunct band from Denton, Texas, Isbell played with back in his Drive-By Truckers days.

Something More Than Free debuted at number 1 on Billboard Magazine's rock, folk and country record charts. Although Isbell had had critical success in the Americana genre, this was the first time he received such high ranking across genres. The album was well received, winning two Grammy awards for Best Americana Album and Best American Roots Song ("24 Frames"). On May 11, 2016, Isbell, a four-time winner, was nominated for three more Americana Music Honors & Awards: Album of the Year (Something More Than Free), Song of the Year ("24 Frames"), and Artist of the Year. He won the first two, while Chris Stapleton won Artist of the Year.

==== The 400 Unit ====
Isbell's band, the 400 Unit, was primarily made up of musicians from the Muscle Shoals, Alabama, area. As of 2026, the band's lineup was:

- Sadler Vaden, guitar, backup vocals – formerly of Drivin' N Cryin'
- Derry deBorja, keyboard, accordion, backup vocals – formerly of Son Volt
- Chad Gamble, drums, backup vocals
- Will Johnson, guitar, backing vocals, drums/percussion, gong

The band's name comes from the 400 Unit, a colloquial name for the psychiatric ward of Eliza Coffee Memorial Hospital in Florence, Alabama. It was originally called the 400 Unit because it was in a separate building from the main three-story hospital. After renovation in the 1980s, the ward was renamed as the Behavioral Health Center, also known as 1st North, and is located on the hospital's first floor.

Jason Isbell and the 400 Unit's eponymous album was released on February 17, 2009, on Lightning Rod Records. Jason Isbell and The 400 Unit was Isbell's second solo release and his first release with The 400 Unit. Matt Pence of Centro-Matic co-produced and engineered the record, as well as playing drums on the record. The band released their self-recorded and produced second album, Here We Rest, on April 12, 2011, on Lightning Rod Records. The song "Alabama Pines" was named Song of the Year at the 2012 Americana Music Awards.

On March 13, 2017, Isbell announced a new album with the 400 Unit, The Nashville Sound, which released in June of that year. The album was a critical success, with Isbell and the band winning the Grammy Award for Best Americana Album and Isbell capturing the Grammy Award for Best American Roots Song at the 60th Annual Grammy Awards. In October 2017, Isbell was announced to be the official artist-in-residence at the Country Music Hall of Fame and Museum. The following year he made a guest appearance on John Prine's album The Tree of Forgiveness. Isbell also contributed the ballad "Maybe It's Time" to the soundtrack of the 2018 film A Star Is Born, where it was performed by actor Bradley Cooper's character, Jackson Maine.

Reunions, the band's next album, was announced in February 2020 and released on May 15 of that year. Isbell once again worked with producer Dave Cobb on the album which featured guest vocals by David Crosby as well as Jay Buchanan of Rival Sons. The album announcement was made alongside the release of the first song of the album, "Be Afraid", which peaked at an Isbell career high number 5 on the Adult Alternative Songs chart. The album's second single, "Dreamsicle" peaked at number 20 on the same chart.

On November 5, 2020, Isbell announced on Twitter that if Joe Biden won the state of Georgia in the 2020 United States presidential election, he would record a charity album featuring covers of songs by Georgia artists, such as R.E.M. and Gladys Knight. After it was projected that Biden had won the state, he reaffirmed his pledge and said work would begin on the album shortly. The album, entitled Georgia Blue, was formally announced on September 14, 2021, with release dates of October 15 for the digital version and November 26 for CD and vinyl. Isbell and the 400 Unit also contributed a cover of the Metallica song "Sad but True" to the charity tribute album The Metallica Blacklist, released in September 2021.

In June 2023, Isbell and the 400 Unit released the album, Weathervanes, on Isbell's own Southeastern Records label. The album, produced by Isbell, includes the singles "Strawberry Woman", "Cast Iron Skillet", and "Miles". In February 2024, Isbell was nominated and won two Grammys, for Best Americana Song: "Cast Iron Skillet" and Best Americana Album: Weathervanes.

== Acting ==
Isbell's first acting role came in 2016 when he guest starred in the animated TV series Squidbillies, providing the voice of pastor Kyle Nubbins. The show has featured other Americana singers in cameo roles, including Elizabeth Cook, Todd Snider, and the Drive-By Truckers, among others. In 2019, Isbell had a cameo as a guitar-playing wedding guest in the HBO film Deadwood: The Movie. Billions, another TV series known for giving cameo roles to musicians, featured Isbell in a 2021 episode, with Isbell playing himself viewing an art exhibit.

In 2021, Isbell was cast in Martin Scorsese's epic Western crime drama film Killers of the Flower Moon (2023) as Bill Smith, a victim of the Osage Indian murders. Bill Smith was the white husband of an Osage woman who was a victim in the murder conspiracy that led to the deaths of many Osage. Isbell's role in the film was announced on April 6, 2021, and marks his major on-screen acting debut; fellow country singer Sturgill Simpson was also announced as being part of the cast.

== Musical influences ==
Isbell has spoken about the importance of his northern Alabama roots: "I definitely don't feel like I would be the musician that I am, or the type of songwriter, had I not come from that particular place," he said in 2012. "The soul music that came out of there, and a lot of the soul-influenced rock and roll and country music that came out of the studios in north Alabama in the 1960s and 1970s had a big influence on me." Isbell said that working at FAME Studios was "everything" to him, that it was "a gateway towards the music that he wanted to play." In addition to citing Neil Young as a big influence, Isbell is a fan of singer-songwriter Ben Howard and guitarist Blake Mills. In January 2018, he appeared in an episode of the Guitar Player mini-documentary series My Life In Five Riffs. He discussed and performed parts of "The Bells of Saint Mary's"; Neil Young's "Cortez the Killer"; "I Know a Little" by Lynyrd Skynyrd; the bluegrass tune "Salt Creek," made famous by Bill Monroe; and David Lindley's slide parts in Jackson Browne's "Running on Empty".

== Personal life ==
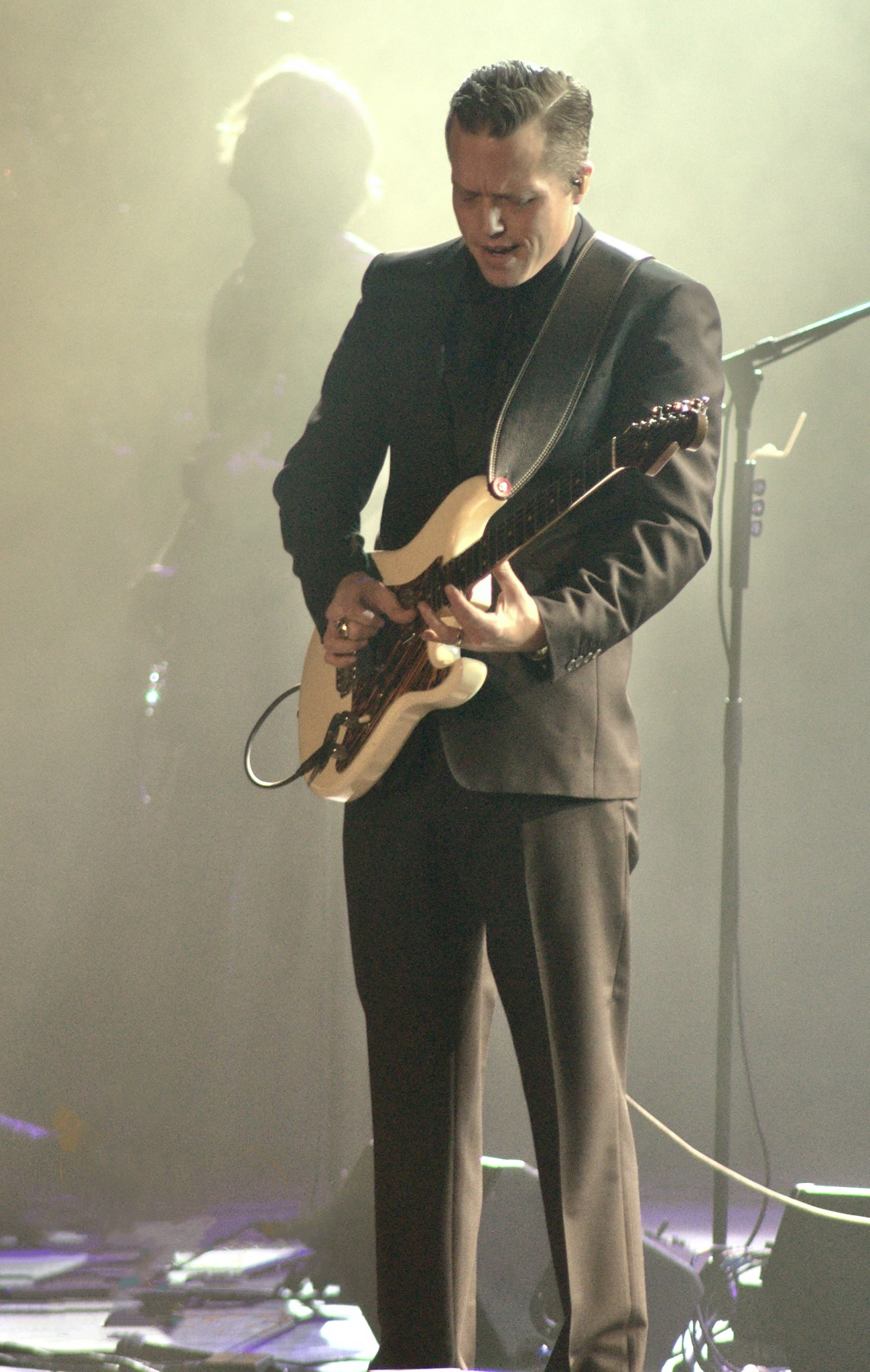
Isbell performing at the Grand Ole Opry on New Year's Eve 2016

Isbell was previously married to Shonna Tucker, a fellow musician from the Muscle Shoals community and a former bass player for Drive-By Truckers. They married in 2002 and divorced in 2007.

In February 2012, singer-songwriter and violinist Amanda Shires, Isbell's manager Traci Thomas, and Ryan Adams initiated an intervention, leading to Isbell entering a rehabilitation treatment program at Cumberland Heights in Nashville. Isbell has discussed getting sober extensively, saying he drank Jack Daniel's and did cocaine during his time with Drive-By Truckers in his late 20s—a time he does not remember very clearly. Southeastern, Isbell's 2013 solo album, is reflective of his newfound sober lifestyle.

Isbell moved to Nashville, Tennessee in 2011, where he has remained since. He married Shires, with whom he had worked on and off for a decade, in February 2013, two days after they finished work on Southeastern. Musician Todd Snider officiated their wedding. The couple have a daughter. On February 8, 2024, news was released that Isbell had filed for divorce from Shires in December 2023.

As of February 2024, Isbell was in a relationship with artist Anna Weyant, who created the artwork to his tenth studio album, Foxes in the Snow, and inspired many of its tracks.

Isbell was friends with Justin Townes Earle and played guitar on several of Earle's albums, including Harlem River Blues. Isbell and Shires both performed in a 2023 tribute concert to Earle after his death from a fentanyl overdose in 2020.

Isbell has a tattoo on the inside of his left arm with a quotation from the lyrics of the Bob Dylan song "Boots of Spanish Leather": "Just carry yourself back to me unspoiled, from across that lonesome ocean." He said that the quote "reminds him about the idea of salvaging things", that for him it "evokes the idea of loss as well as learning and growing from the experience". During the 2015 Newport Folk Festival, Isbell cited Dylan as a huge influence on his writing.

Isbell is politically left-wing, frequently expressing his support for gun control, abortion rights, policing reform, LGBTQ and transgender rights. In one instance of the former, Isbell posted the following to Twitter on the day of the 2019 Dayton shooting: "If you're on here arguing the definition of 'assault weapon' today you are part of the problem. You know what an assault weapon is, and you know you don't need one." A Twitter user by the name of William McNabb responded to Isbell, asking what he as a "rural American" should use to kill the "30-50 feral hogs" in his yard. McNabb's tweet itself soon became an internet meme, with Twitter users widely mocking him for what was perceived to be an absurd hypothetical question that was quizzically worded.

Isbell performed at the 2024 Democratic National Convention on August 19, 2024. He had previously campaigned for Democratic nominee Kamala Harris along with Michael Stipe.

== Discography ==
=== Studio albums ===
Title	Album details	Peak chart positions							Sales
Title	Album details	US	US Indie	US Country	US Folk	US Rock	AUS	UK	Sales
Sirens of the Ditch	Release date: July 10, 2007; Label: New West; Format: CD, LP, download	—	33	—	—	—	—	—	
Jason Isbell and the 400 Unit (with the 400 Unit)	Release date: February 17, 2009; Label: Lightning Rod; Format: CD, LP, download	131	17	—	—	—	—	—	
Here We Rest (with the 400 Unit)	Release date: April 12, 2011; Label: Lightning Rod; Format: CD, LP, download	79	15	—	—	24	—	—	
Southeastern	Release date: June 11, 2013; Label: Southeastern; Format: CD, LP, download	23	5	—	—	7	—	—	US: 148,000
Something More Than Free	Release date: July 17, 2015; Label: Southeastern; Format: CD, LP, download	6	2	1	1	1	32	17	US: 143,000
The Nashville Sound (with the 400 Unit)	Release date: June 16, 2017; Label: Southeastern; Format: CD, LP, download	4	1	1	1	1	30	26	US: 152,500
Reunions (with the 400 Unit)	Release date: May 8, 2020; Label: Southeastern; Format: CD, LP, download	9	1	1	1	1	19	18	
Georgia Blue (with the 400 Unit)	Release date: October 15, 2021; Label: Southeastern; Format: CD, LP, download	83	48	—	6	—	—	—	
Weathervanes (with the 400 Unit)	Release date: June 9, 2023; Label: Southeastern; Format: CD, LP, download	12	1	—	2	2	88	51	
Foxes in the Snow	Release date: March 7, 2025; Label: Southeastern; Format: CD, LP, download	27	5	4	2	3	—	58	
"—" denotes releases that did not chart

=== Live albums ===
Title	Album details	Peak chart positions				Sales
Title	Album details	US	US Indie	US Vinyl	US Taste	Sales
Live at Twist & Shout 11.16.07	Release date: December 15, 2008; Label: New West	—	—	—	—	
Live from Alabama	Release date: November 19, 2012; Label: Lightning Rod	—	27	—	16	
Live from Welcome to 1979 (exclusive release for Record Store Day 2017)	Release date: April 22, 2017; Label: Thirty Tigers	—	10	5	8	
Live from the Ryman	Release date: October 19, 2018; Label: Thirty Tigers	38	—	—	—	US: 19,800
Live from the Ryman Vol. 2	Release date: October 4, 2024; Label: Southeastern	—	—	—	—	
"—" denotes releases that did not chart

=== Extended plays ===
Title	EP details	Peak positions
Title	EP details	US
The Sound Emporium EP (with Amanda Shires)	Release date: April 22, 2023; Label: Southeastern	178

=== Singles ===
Title	Year	Peak chart positions		Certifications	Album
Title	Year	US Rock	AAA	Certifications	Album
"Brand New Kind of Actress"	2007	—	—		Sirens of the Ditch
"Stockholm"	2013	—	—		Southeastern
"Cover Me Up"	2013	—	—	RIAA: Gold	Southeastern
"Tecumseh Valley / Pancho & Lefty" (with Elizabeth Cook)	2013	—	—		Non-album singles
"Christmas in Dixie / Old Flame" (with The Blind Boys of Alabama & John Paul White)	2013	—	—		Non-album singles
"Born in the U.S.A." (with Amanda Shires)	2014	—	—		Dead Man's Town
"Sea Songs" (with Amanda Shires)	2015	—	—		Non-album single
"24 Frames"	2015	—	8		Something More Than Free
"Something More Than Free"	2015	—	—		Something More Than Free
"Hope the High Road" (with The 400 Unit)	2017	—	14		The Nashville Sound
"Cumberland Gap" (with The 400 Unit)	2017	—	—		The Nashville Sound
"If We Were Vampires" (with The 400 Unit)	2017	—	29	RIAA: Gold	The Nashville Sound
"Whisper / The Assassin"	2018	—	—		Non-album singles
"Crystal Clear"	2018	—	—		Non-album singles
"Racetrack Romeo"	2018	—	—		Non-album singles
"Be Afraid" (with The 400 Unit)	2020	38	5		Reunions
"What've I Done to Help" (with The 400 Unit)	2020	48	—		Reunions
"Only Children" (with The 400 Unit)	2020	34	—		Reunions
"Dreamsicle" (with The 400 Unit)	2020	47	—		Reunions
"Maybe It's Time" (Demo) / "Alabama Sky"	2020	—	—		Non-album single
"Sad But True" (with The 400 Unit)	2021	—	—		The Metallica Blacklist
"Split Single: Edition One" (with Bleachers)	2021	—	—		Non-album single
"Driver 8" (with The 400 Unit)	2021	—	—		Georgia Blue
"Midnight Train to Georgia" (with The 400 Unit)	2021	—	—		Georgia Blue
"For the Birds" (with Paula Cole & John Paul White)	2022	—	—		Non-album single
"Death Wish"	2023	—	12		Weathervanes
"Middle of the Morning"	2023	—	—		Weathervanes
"They Wait"	2023	—	—		Weathervanes
"Cast Iron Skillet" (with The 400 Unit)	2023	—	27		Weathervanes
"Save the World" (with The 400 Unit)	2023	—	—		Weathervanes
"When We Were Close" (with The 400 Unit)	2023	—	8		Weathervanes
"Look What You've Done to Your Brother"	2023	—	—		Killers of the Flower Moon
"You're Gonna Get It"	2024	—	—		Non-album single
"Bury Me"	2025	—	25		Foxes in the Snow
"Foxes in the Snow"	2025	—	—		Foxes in the Snow
"—" denotes releases that did not chart

=== Music videos ===
Year	Video	Director
2011	"Alabama Pines"	
2013	"Traveling Alone"	James Weems
2014	"Super 8"	
2015	"24 Frames"	
2017	"If We Were Vampires"	Joshua Britt & Neilson Hubbard
2023	"King of Oklahoma"	Rahul Chakraborty
2023	"White Beretta"	Dave Willis & Jim Fortier

=== Producer credit ===
Year	Album	Artist	Label
2012	Burn. Flicker. Die.	American Aquarium	Last Chance Records
2019	Fever Breaks	Josh Ritter	Pytheas Recordings
2025	Billionaire	Kathleen Edwards	Dualtone

== Filmography ==
Year	Work	Role	Notes	Ref.
2016–21	Squidbillies	Pastor Nubbins / Reverend (voice)	5 episodes	
2019	Deadwood: The Movie	Wedding Guest	TV movie; uncredited	
2021	Billions	Jason Isbell (himself)	1 episode	
2023	Killers of the Flower Moon	Bill Smith	Film	
2025	One Spoon of Chocolate	Business Man	Film	

== Awards and nominations ==
=== Americana Music Honors & Awards ===
The Americana Music Honors & Awards celebrate outstanding achievement in the genre of Americana. Isbell has won nine awards out of 19 nominations.

Year	Category	Nominated work	Result
2009	Album of the Year	Jason Isbell and The 400 Unit	Nominated
2012	Song of the Year	"Alabama Pines"	Won
2012	Album of the Year	Here We Rest	Nominated
2012	Artist of the Year	Jason Isbell	Nominated
2014	Song of the Year	"Cover Me Up"	Won
2014	Album of the Year	Southeastern	Won
2014	Artist of the Year	Jason Isbell	Won
2015	Artist of the Year	Jason Isbell	Nominated
2016	Album of the Year	Something More Than Free	Won
2016	Song of the Year	"24 Frames"	Won
2016	Artist of the Year	Jason Isbell	Nominated
2017	Artist of the Year	Jason Isbell	Nominated
2018	Artist of the Year	Jason Isbell	Nominated
2018	Album of the Year	The Nashville Sound	Won
2018	Duo/Group of the Year	Jason Isbell & the 400 Unit	Won
2018	Song of the Year	"If We Were Vampires"	Won
2021	Artist of the Year	Jason Isbell	Nominated
2021	Album of the Year	Reunions	Nominated
2021	Song of the Year	"Dreamsicle"	Nominated
2025	Album of the Year	Foxes in the Snow	Nominated

=== Country Music Association Awards ===
The CMA Awards celebrate outstanding achievement in country music. Isbell has received one nomination.

Year	Category	Nominated work	Result
2017	Album of the Year	The Nashville Sound	Nominated

=== Country Music Hall of Fame ===
Year	Category	Nominated work	Result
2017	Artist-in-Residence	N/A	Won

=== Daytime Emmy Awards ===
The Daytime Emmy Awards are American accolades bestowed by the New York–based National Academy of Television Arts and Sciences in recognition of excellence in American daytime television programming. Isbell has received one nomination.

Year	Category	Nominated work	Result
2018	Outstanding Musical Performance in a Daytime Program	"Cumberland Gap"/"If We Were Vampires" on CBS This Morning	Nominated

=== Grammy Awards ===
The Grammy Awards celebrate outstanding achievement in music. Isbell has won 6 awards out of 10 nominations.

Year	Category	Nominated work	Result
2016	Best American Roots Song	"24 Frames"	Won
2016	Best Americana Album	Something More Than Free	Won
2018	Best American Roots Song	"If We Were Vampires"	Won
2018	Best Americana Album	The Nashville Sound	Won
2024	Best American Roots Performance	"King of Oklahoma"	Nominated
2024	Best American Roots Song	"Cast Iron Skillet"	Won
2024	Best Americana Album	Weathervanes	Won
2026	Best American Roots Song	"Foxes in the Snow"	Nominated
2026	Best American Roots Performance	"Crimson and Clay"	Nominated
2026	Best Folk Album	Foxes in the Snow	Nominated

=== UK Americana Awards ===
The UK Americana Awards celebrate the best roots music released in the UK and internationally. Isbell has won three awards out of five nominations.

Year	Category	Nominated work	Result
2016	International Artist of the Year	Jason Isbell	Won
2018	International Album of the Year	The Nashville Sound	Won
2024	International Album of the Year	Weathervanes	Nominated
2024	International Artist of the Year	Jason Isbell	Nominated
2024	International Trailblazer Award	Jason Isbell	Won

== Home media ==
- Weissman, Barr, Patterson Hood, Mike Cooley, Shonna Tucker, Brad Morgan, John Neff, and Jason Isbell. The Secret to a Happy Ending: A Documentary About the Drive-By Truckers. New York: ATO Records, 2011. (DVD of 2009 documentary)

== See also ==
- Muscle Shoals Sound Studio
- Muscle Shoals, Alabama
- Amanda Shires
