= Weathervanes (Jason Isbell and the 400 Unit album) =

Studio album by Jason Isbell and the 400 Unit
- Released: June 09, 2023
- Length: 60:30
- Label: Southeastern
- Producer: Jason Isbell

Jason Isbell and the 400 Unit chronology
Georgia Blue (2021)	Weathervanes (2023)	Foxes in the Snow (2025)

Weathervanes is the ninth studio album by American singer-songwriter Jason Isbell, and the sixth accompanied by his backing band the 400 Unit. It was released on June 9, 2023, through Southeastern Records. The album received acclaim from critics, as well as the Grammy Award for Best Americana Album at the 66th Annual Grammy Awards.

== Background ==
Isbell wrote the tracks while starring in Martin Scorsese's 2023 film Killers of the Flower Moon.

== Critical reception ==
Professional ratings
Aggregate scores
Source	Rating
AnyDecentMusic?	7.8/10
Metacritic	82/100
Review scores
Source	Rating
AllMusic	4.5/5 stars
Paste	8.2/10
Pitchfork	7.5/10
Slant Magazine	3/5 stars
Sputnikmusic	4.2/5

Weathervanes received a score of 82 out of 100 on review aggregator Metacritic based on 13 critics' reviews, indicating "universal acclaim". Mark Deming of AllMusic wrote that the album "finds [Isbell] shaking things up a bit to keep himself sharp [...] and if the sound of the album isn't radically different, the feel is leaner and more direct while still full-bodied and richly detailed". Deming concluded that Weathervanes is "a triumph, an outstanding set of songs and performances from someone who has already proved they're one of the strongest, truest voices in American roots rock".

Stephen Thomas Erlewine, reviewing the album for Pitchfork, found that "these songs reveal their intricacies slowly, the measured, almost leisurely pace suggesting that Isbell is confident that his audience will stick with the album as they learn its subtle pleasures", and that Isbell's production "chooses to emphasize performance as much as the songwriting, a decision that shines a light on the 400 Unit's chemistry", with the 400 Unit "excel[ling] on the quieter songs". Will Hermes of Rolling Stone described the album as "brutally beautiful" and wrote that its "songs tremble with anger, desperation, and fear; characters wrestle with regret and unhealthy appetites, struggling to cut losses in the wake of bad choices and cascading consequences", commenting that "in these grim times, this is effectively feel-good music".

Ellen Johnson of Paste wrote that "despite a few lyrical lowlights, Weathervanes is another undeniable product from Isbell and his fellow players" and that it "hits close to home too, but it finds more inspiration in the everyday moments". Johnson pointed out "its steadiness" as "one of its most attractive attributes" and concluded that the album "again affirms Isbell's place as an Alabama legend". A staff reviewer for Sputnikmusic felt that while the album's "subject matter of individual songs may run a gamut, but themes are near-universally downcast and distressing", the 400 Unit provides "bursting-out-of-the-gate energy" and Isbell "reliably exceptional songwriting", as well as "a talent for subtle but inescapable hooks which make the doom and gloom of these songs not only bearable, but rather inviting".

Jeremy Winograd of Slant Magazine opined that Isbell "seems to have intended the self-produced Weathervanes as a long-overdue showcase for the 400 Unit as an ensemble" and felt that while the band's "musicianship is sparkling throughout", Weathervanes is "the least consistent Isbell album in nearly 15 years". Winograd also remarked that "at 13 tracks and over an hour of similar tempos and familiar-sounding melodies, the album often feels plodding and redundant".

== Track listing ==
Weathervanes track listing
No.	Title	Length
1.	"Death Wish"	4:30
2.	"King of Oklahoma"	5:02
3.	"Strawberry Woman"	4:10
4.	"Middle of the Morning"	4:40
5.	"Save the World"	5:09
6.	"If You Insist"	3:45
7.	"Cast Iron Skillet"	3:24
8.	"When We Were Close"	3:57
9.	"Volunteer"	4:05
10.	"Vestavia Hills"	4:31
11.	"White Beretta"	3:56
12.	"This Ain't It"	6:14
13.	"Miles"	7:07
Total length:		60:30

== Charts ==
Chart performance for Weathervanes
Chart (2023)	Peak position
Australian Albums (ARIA)	88
Belgian Albums (Ultratop Flanders)	130
Dutch Albums (Album Top 100)	43
German Albums (Offizielle Top 100)	75
Scottish Albums (Official Charts)	9
UK Albums (Official Charts)	51
UK Independent Albums (Official Charts)	8
US Billboard 200	12
US Folk Albums (Billboard)	2
US Independent Albums (Billboard)	1
US Top Rock Albums (Billboard)	2
