= Carrying Lightning =

Studio album by Amanda Shires
- Released: May 3, 2011
- Studio: True Tone Studio, Route 1 Acuff Studio
- Genre: Country; Americana
- Length: 43:02
- Producer: Amanda Shires, David Henry, Rod Picott

Amanda Shires chronology
West Cross Timbers (2009)	Carrying Lightning (2011)	Down Fell the Doves (2013)

Carrying Lightning is the third studio album by American singer-songwriter Amanda Shires. Self-published and released on May 3, 2011, the album was co-produced by Shires, David Henry, and Rod Picott. Writing in The Austin Chronicle, reviewer Jim Caligiuri wrote that the album "finds her balancing dusky overtones with occasional buoyancy. In the process, the fiddler and singer-songwriter lands somewhere between the perkiness of Dolly Parton, whom she resembles vocally on occasion, and the disquieting poetry of Richard Buckner".

In a list published by American Songwriter, the magazine ranked the third track on the album "When You Need a Train It Never Comes" as the fifth-best song of 2011.

== Track listing ==
All songs by Amanda Shires except (7):

1. "Swimmer..." - 3:07
2. "Ghost Bird" - 3:46
3. "When You Need a Train It Never Comes" - 4:13
4. "She Let Go of Her Kite" - 3:46
5. "Love Be a Bird" - 3:09
6. "Shake the Walls" - 3:19
7. "Detroit or Buffalo" (Barbara Keith) - 4:06
8. "Sloe Gin" - 4:24
9. "Kudzu" - 2:54
10. "Bees in the Shed" - 4:04
11. "Lovesick I Remain" - 3:13
12. "Swimmer... Dreams Don't Keep" (Instrumental) - 2:01

== Personnel ==
as listed on the CD sleeve:

=== Musicians ===
- Amanda Shires – fiddle, ukulele, strings, whistling, vocals
- David Henry – strings, percussion, pianos
- Chris Scruggs – steel guitar
- Rod Picott – acoustic guitar, electric guitar
- Tommy Perkinson – drums, percussion, toy piano
- Neal Casal – electric guitar, acoustic guitar, harmony vocal
- Paul Slivka – bass
- Will Kimbrough – electric guitar
- Colt Miller – banjo, acoustic guitar
- Kris Killingsworth – drums
- Steph Dickinson – upright bass

=== Production ===
- Amanda Shires – producer
- David Henry – producer, recording (3–6), (8–12), engineering, and mixing
- Rod Picott – producer
- Alan Crossland – recording (1, 2, 7)
- Kelly Amber Garcia – design
