= Being Brave =

Studio album by Amanda Shires
- Released: 2005
- Genre: Folk
- Length: 44:14
- Label: Yellowhouse Music
- Producers: Amanda Shires, Andy Wilkinson

Amanda Shires chronology
Being Brave (2005)	West Cross Timbers (2009)

Being Brave is the first studio album by American singer-songwriter Amanda Shires. The album was recorded at Route 1, Acuff Studios in Acuff, Texas and co-produced by Shires and Andy Wilkinson. The album consists of several traditional and self-penned fiddle tunes. In May 2014, Shires told interviewer Alan Harrison of The Rocking Magpie that Being Brave "isn’t really a ‘debut’ album, but more of a showcase for my playing and occasional singing".

== Track listing ==
As listed on the CD digisleeve:

1. "Uncle Herm's Hornpipe and Twinkle Little Star" (Traditional) - 2:20
2. "There's Words" (Amanda Shires) - 2:17
3. "Ragtime Annie" (Traditional) - 3:49
4. "Cattle in the Cane" (Traditional) - 1:54
5. "Low and Lonely" (Floyd Jenkins) - 3:03
6. "Garfield's Reel" (Traditional) - 1:49
7. "Lone Star Rag" (Traditional) - 2:18
8. "Where's My Heart" (Shires, Daniel Fluitt) - 4:46
9. "Cotton Patch Rag" (Traditional) - 4:37
10. "Little Rock Getaway" (Joe Sullivan) - 3:11
11. "Holdin' On" (Shires) - 2:57
12. "Road to Lisdoonvarna" (Traditional) - 2:26
13. "Hearts Are Breakin'" (Shires) - 4:06
14. "La Golondrina" (Narciso Serradell) - 4:41

== Personnel ==
As listed on the CD digisleeve:

=== Musicians ===
- Amanda Shires - fiddle, vocals
- Kenny Maines - guitar (1, 4, 5, 7, 12)
- Lanny Fiel - guitar (2, 6), saloon piano (3), piano (7)
- Colt Miller - guitar (2, 8, 13), accordion (11, 13)
- Andy Wilkinson - guitar (3, 6, 9)
- Alan Munde - banjo (3, 5, 10)
- Anne Luna - bass (5)
- Daniel Fluits - vocal (8)
- Rusty Hudelson - accordion (9)
- Joe Carr - mandolin (10, 12)
- Alan Crossland - tom tom (13), snake tambourine (13)

=== Production ===
- Amanda Shires - producer, arrangement, photography
- Andy Wilkinson - producer
- Alan Crossland - engineering, mixing, mastering, photography
- Dirk Fowler - layout, design
