= Down Fell the Doves =

2013 studio album by Amanda Shires

Studio album by Amanda Shires
- Released: August 6, 2013
- Studios: Chase Park Transduction (Athens, Georgia)
- Genres: Country; Americana
- Length: 38:36
- Label: Lightning Rod Records
- Producer: Andy LeMaster

Amanda Shires chronology
Carrying Lightning (2011)	Down Fell the Doves (2013)	My Piece of Land (2016)

Down Fell the Doves is the fourth studio album by American singer-songwriter Amanda Shires. The album was recorded in Athens, Georgia at Chase Park Transduction and produced by Andy LeMaster. Released on August 6, 2013 on the Lightning Rod Records label, the album features strong songwriting and fiddle interludes by Shires, accompanied by Jason Isbell and members of his band the 400 Unit.

== Background ==
Shires experienced several significant events in the months during and following the May 2011 release of her highly-acclaimed third album, Carrying Lightning. A four-year relationship with Rod Picott, which had included collaboration on the album Sew Your Heart with Wires in 2009, ended. An onstage accident destroyed the favorite antique violin Shires had played for fifteen years.

Concentrating on her poetry skills to improve her songwriting, Shires began pursuing a Master of Fine Arts degree at Sewanee. However, as she was enjoying summer with classmates at Saint Andrews Lake near the university campus, Shires suffered a major fracture of her left ring finger while using a rope swing. The injury required surgery and permanent pins to repair, and forced Shires to relearn much of her violin fingering technique during a slow rehabilitation period. Shires experienced almost no muscle use in the finger for over two years, time she spent fearing permanent loss, before the finger gained some strength as she drew inspiration from knowing of similar performing obstacles overcome by jazz guitarist Django Reinhardt and fellow country performer and mentor Billy Joe Shaver.

Adding to anticipation for a new album, Shires was named Artist of the Year 2011 by Texas Music magazine, appearing on the publication's Winter 2012 cover. As she was preparing Down Fell the Doves, Shires and Jason Isbell began a relationship that evolved into heavy drinker Isbell's sobriety, the couple's marriage, and several years of musical tenure together in the studio and on tours.

== Reception ==
Album reviewers wrote that Shires' songwriting and playing on Down Fell the Doves showed she had moved on from her beginnings as a Western swing fiddle player, and that the album convincingly established her as a highly talented songwriter and musical stylist. Comments also noted that songwriting talent was primarily involved in explorations of troubling topics, often whimsically through dark humor.

One song critics pointed to as illustrative of this is "A Song for Leonard Cohen", in which Shires intones, over Isbell's tinkling lounge piano, a fantasy meetup where she and Leonard Cohen walk together while the renowned songwriter talks, and then is left to pay their bar tab because Shires has forgotten her wallet.

"Box Cutters", in which Shires playfully catalogues her likes and dislikes about various contemplated methods of suicide, and "Bulletproof", a fantasy about being invincible as the result of receiving a real tiger claw from a fan who told her it was a charm that would make Shires bulletproof also caught reviewers' attention.

In a highly favorable review, No Depression writer Michael Bialas highlighted Shires' writing talent and a powerful desire to educate herself as guaranteeing the excellence of Down Fell the Doves:

Though she’s as modest as her upbringing in Lubbock, Shires has a way with words that goes far beyond her 31 years.
Yet the wise wordsmith acts nothing like a know-it-all. In fact, her favorite word in the English language must be learn. Because during a conversation that lasted nearly an hour, she used that action verb almost 30 times while discussing, among many other subjects, her eternal quest for knowledge.

The album's title is found in the final song, "The Garden (What a Mess)", a post-breakup lament with haunting fiddle breakouts.

== Track listing ==
All songs by Amanda Shires

1. "Look Like a Bird" - 3:29
2. "Devastate" - 3:18
3. "Bulletproof" - 4:13
4. "Box Cutters" - 2:36
5. "Deep Dark Below" - 3:21
6. "Wasted and Rollin'" - 3:52
7. "If I..." - 2:14
8. "Stay" - 3:54
9. "The Drop and Lift" - 3:37
10. "A Song for Leonard Cohen" - 3:53
11. "The Garden (What a Mess)" - 4:09

== Personnel ==
as listed on the CD sleeve:

Musicians

- Amanda Shires - vocals, violins, ukuleles
- Jason Isbell - guitars, vocals, piano on (10)
- Andy LeMaster - guitar, noise, vocals
- Chad Gamble - drums
- Jimbo Hart - bass

On (8) "Stay":

- Chad Fisher - trombone
- Joel Gransden - trumpet
- Brad Guin - tenor saxophone
- Chad Fisher, Amanda Shires - horn arrangements

Production

- Andy LeMaster - producer, engineering, mixing
- Will Manning - assistant engineer
- Alex McCollough - mastering
- Erica Shires - photography
- Dirk Fowler - layout, design
