= Habeas corpus (disambiguation) =

Habeas corpus is a legal action through which a person can seek relief from unlawful detention.

Habeas corpus may also refer to:

- Habeas Corpus Act 1679, an Act of the Parliament of England passed during the reign of King Charles II to define and strengthen the writ of habeas corpus
- Habeas Corpus (1928 film), a Laurel and Hardy short
- Habeas Corpus, the name of the fictional film that is being made in the film The Player
- "Habeas Corpus", an episode of the television series Ultraviolet
- "Habeas Corpses", a 2003 episode of the television series Angel
- Habeas Corpus (play), a 1973 comedy stage play by Alan Bennett
- Habeas Corpus (pig), a fictional pet in the pulp magazine Doc Savage
- Habeas Corpus (album), an album by Living Things
- Habeas corpus (gastropod), see List of non-marine molluscs of Brazil
