= Still Fighting the War =

Studio album by Slaid Cleaves
- Released: June 17, 2013
- Genre: Folk
- Length: 43:36
- Label: Music Road Records
- Producer: Scrappy Jud Newcomb; Lloyd Maines; Mark Hallman

Slaid Cleaves chronology
Sorrow and Smoke (2011)	Still Fighting the War (2013)	Ghost on the Car Radio (2017)

Professional ratings
Aggregate scores
Source	Rating
Metacritic	79/100
Review scores
Source	Rating
American Songwriter	4.5/5 stars
Austin Chronicle	4/5 stars
Blurt	3/5 stars

Still Fighting the War is a studio album by American musician Slaid Cleaves. It was released in June 2013 under Music Road Records.

== Track listing ==
No.	Title	Writer(s)	Length
1.	"Still Fighting the War" (featuring Jimmy LaFave)	Slaid Cleaves, Ron Coy	2:56
2.	"Without Her"	Cleaves	2:41
3.	"Rust Belt Fields"	Cleaves, Rod Picott	4:11
4.	"Hometown USA"	Cleaves, Jeff Elliot, Mike Morgan	3:53
5.	"Gone"	Cleaves, Nicole St. Pierre	3:11
6.	"Welding Burns"	Cleaves, Picott	3:23
7.	"I Bet She Does"	Cleaves	2:51
8.	"Whim of Iron" (featuring Harmoni Kelley McCarty)	Cleaves	2:29
9.	"Texas Love Song" (featuring Terri Hendrix)	Cleaves	3:03
10.	"God's Own Yodeler"	Cleaves	3:49
11.	"In the Rain" (featuring Eliza Gilkyson)	Cleaves	3:12
12.	"Voice of Midnight"	Cleaves	3:55

Note: Some versions of the CD insert “Go for the Gold” between “In the Rain” and “Voice of Midnight”

== Chart performance ==
Chart (2013)	Peak position
U.S. Billboard Top Country Albums	54
U.S. Billboard Top Heatseekers	26
