= Loving You (Amanda Shires and Bobbie Nelson album) =

Studio album by Amanda Shires and Bobbie Nelson
- Released: June 23, 2023
- Studio: Arlyn Studios (Austin, Texas)
- Genre: Country
- Length: 34:35
- Label: ATO Records
- Producer: Lawrence Rothman, Amanda Shires

Amanda Shires chronology
Take It Like a Man (2022)	Loving You (2023)	Nobody's Girl (2025)

Bobbie Nelson chronology
The Willie Nelson Family (2021)	Loving You (2023)

Loving You is a collaborative studio album by American singer-songwriter Amanda Shires and pianist Bobbie Nelson. The album was recorded in Austin, Texas at Arlyn Studios and released June 23, 2023 on the ATO Records label. Loving You features Nelson playing piano on ten songs with Shires' accompaniment on fiddle and vocals. Produced by Lawrence Rothman and Shires, it was recorded in 2021 shortly before Nelson's death in March 2022.

== Background ==
In her liner notes for Loving You, Shires writes that "Loving You", the instrumental title track, was "the only song Bobbie Nelson ever wrote on her own". Shires later told Texas Monthly that Nelson's career, which was similar to Shires' early work as a touring fiddle player in the Texas Playboys, inspired her own. Beginning in 1973, Nelson played piano in The Family with her brother Willie Nelson for forty-eight years.

During recording for her 2022 album Take It Like a Man, Shires worked on a cover version of "Always on My Mind", thinking it fit well with the other planned songs she had written. Upon hearing an early attempt, she decided to tell producer Lawrence Rothman she wanted Bobbie Nelson to play with her on "Always on My Mind". Once they worked on the song, the two women decided to save it for a project they would record together, which became Loving You.

== Track list ==
As listed on the CD liner:

1. "Waltz Across Texas" (Billy Talmadge) - 2:47
2. "Always on My Mind" (Wayne Carson, Johnny Christopher, Mark James) - 3:54
3. "Old Fashioned Love" (Frank Loesser, Fritz Miller) - 3:15
4. "Summertime" (feat. Willie Nelson) (George Gershwin, DuBose Heyward, Ira Gershwin) - 4:05
5. Angel Flying Too Close to the Ground (Willie Nelson) - 2:49
6. Dream a Little Dream of Me (Fabian Andre, Wilbur Schwandt, Gus Kahn) - 2:38
7. Tempted and Tried (W. B. Stevens or Barney E. Warren) - 3:25
8. La Paloma (Sebastián Yradier) - 4:10
9. Loving You (Bobbie Nelson) - 3:26
10. Over the Rainbow (Harold Arlen, Yip Harburg) - 4:06

== Personnel ==
As listed on the CD liner:

=== Musicians ===
- Bobbie Nelson – piano
- Amanda Shires – vocals, fiddle
- Freddy Fletcher – drums
- Chris Maresh – upright bass
- Lawrence Rothman – guitars, chamberlin
- Todd Lombardo – nylon guitar, banjo
- Willie Nelson – vocals (4)
- Chris Powell – drums (4)
- Jay Bellerose – drums (1, 3, 4)
- Jordan Lehning – string arrangement
- Kristin Weber – violin
- Emily Rodgers – cello
- Quentin Flowers – double bass
- Brian David Willis – digital editing

=== Production ===
- Lawrence Rothman – producer, mixing
- Jacob Sciba – engineering
- Pete Lyman – mastering
- Joshua Black Wilkins – photography
- Will Welch – art direction
