= Amanda Shires =

American singer-songwriter

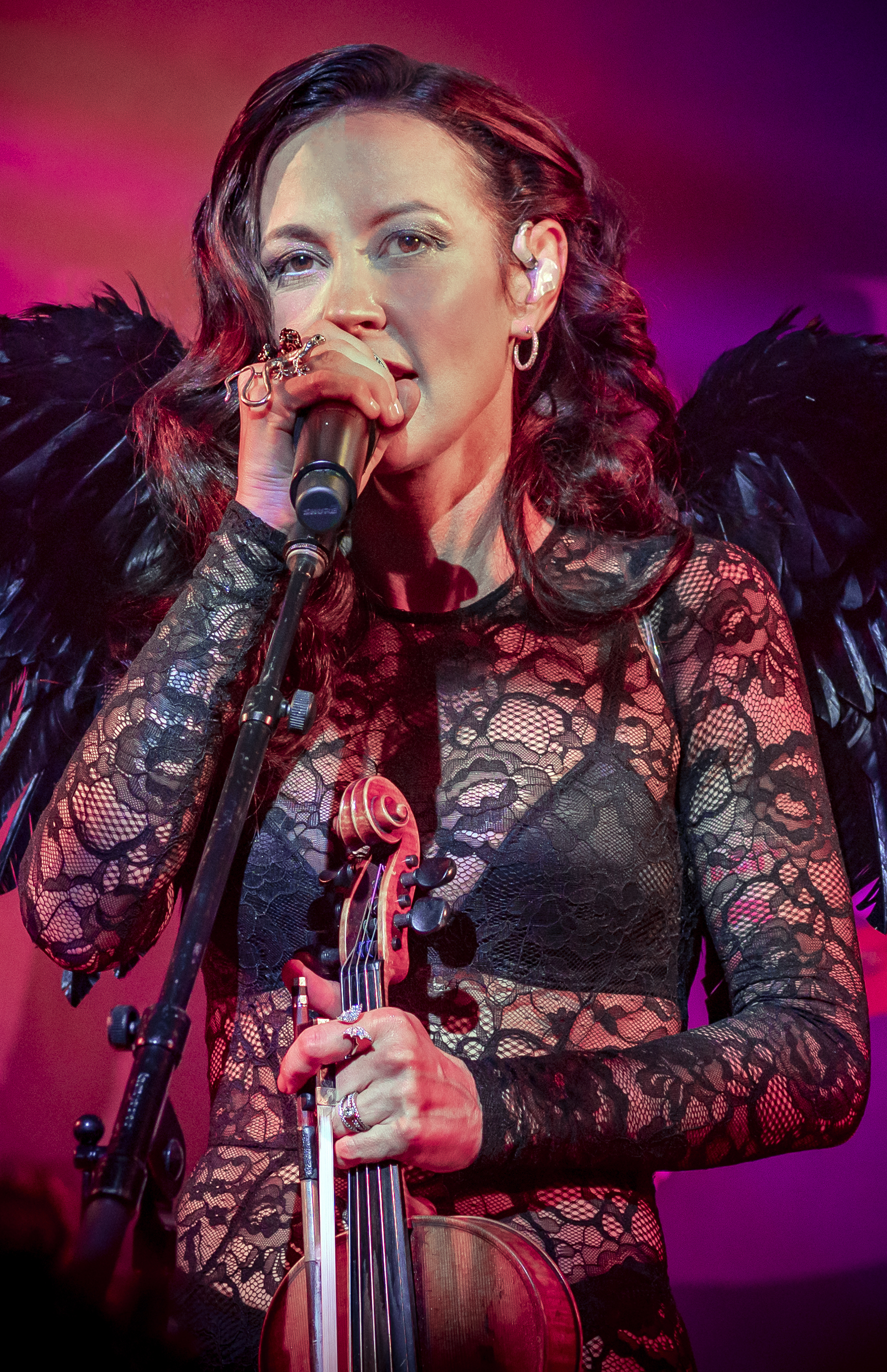
- Shires performing in October 2022

Background information
- Born: Amanda Rose Shires; March 5, 1982 (age 44); Lubbock, Texas, U.S.
- Genres: Americana; folk; alternative country; folk rock; country folk
- Occupations: Singer; songwriter
- Instruments: Vocals; fiddle; autoharp; ukulele; tenor guitar
- Years active: 1997–present
- Label: ATO
- Member of: The 400 Unit, The Highwomen
- Spouse: Jason Isbell (m. 2013; div. 2025)
- Website: amandashiresmusic.com

Amanda Rose Shires (born March 5, 1982) is an American singer-songwriter and fiddle player. Shires has released nine solo albums starting in 2005, her most recent being Nobody's Girl in 2025. In 2019, she founded a country music supergroup called The Highwomen alongside Brandi Carlile, Maren Morris and Natalie Hemby and has also performed as a member of the Texas Playboys, Thrift Store Cowboys, and Jason Isbell & the 400 Unit, as well as in a duo with Rod Picott. Along with Jason Isbell & the 400 Unit, Shires won the Grammy Award for Best Americana Album for their 2017 album The Nashville Sound.

== Early life ==
Following her parents' divorce, Shires' childhood was divided between the Texas cities of Lubbock and Mineral Wells. Her mother is a retired nurse. She also used to be a barrel racer at rodeos. Her father owns a wholesale nursery in Mineral Wells and has a hobby of gold prospecting in Alaska. She is distantly related to noted photographer Erica Shires, who produced the video for the song "Swimmer".

At the age of 10, she happened to be with her father while he was shopping for hunting gear at a pawn shop in Mineral Wells. She saw an inexpensive fiddle for sale and her father agreed to buy it for her on the condition that she learn to play it. It took a while for her to play it well; she usually practiced outside because her dog had a habit of howling while she played. When she was 12, she started taking fiddle lessons in Lubbock from Lanny Fiel, who knew Frankie McWhorter from the Texas Playboys. She then started learning fiddle from McWhorter and was later invited to play at the band's shows. At the age of 15, she joined the Texas Playboys, the former backing band for Western swing legend Bob Wills.

== Musical career ==
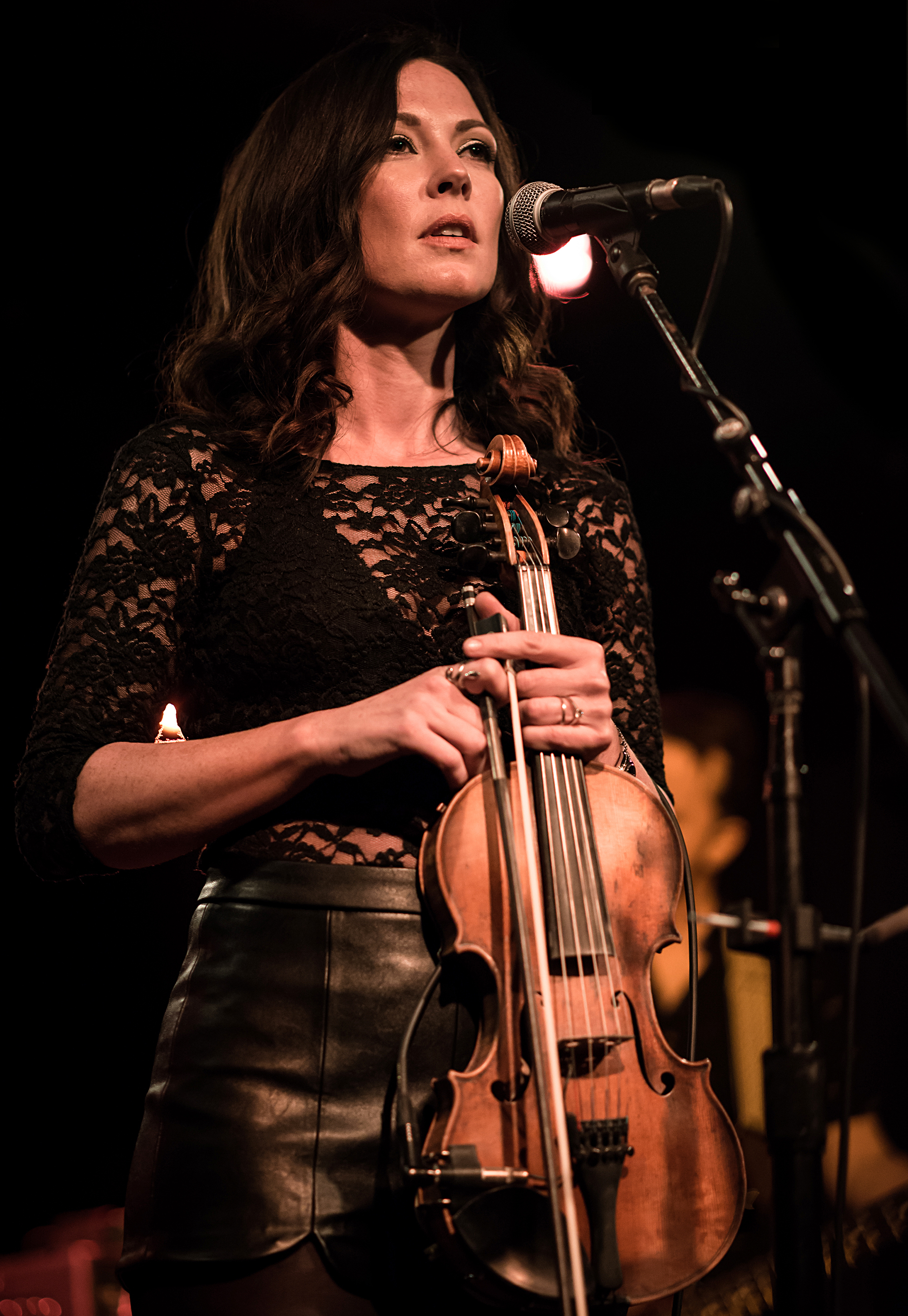
Shires performing in 2016

Shires continued to pursue full time work as a touring side musician in the early 2000s, gaining experience backing veterans of the Texas outlaw country circuit. She played fiddle on tour with Billy Joe Shaver and later Todd Snider, both highly respected singer-songwriters. Shaver encouraged Shires to record her fiddle playing and singing in order to provide a CD sample for sale.

In 2005 Shires released a public demo album, the mostly instrumental Being Brave. She described the album as a type of résumé offered to show attendees: "When we toured it was expected that the fiddle players would have their own stuff to sell; which is why I recorded Being Brave, which isn’t really a ‘debut’ album, but more of a showcase for my playing and occasional singing."

Encouraged by positive support from the songwriting veterans she was playing fiddle for on Texas tours, Shires moved to Nashville to pursue a solo career in 2008. The next year, she released West Cross Timbers as her debut album as a solo singer-songwriter.

Shires had toured had extensively with Rod Picott from 2006. In 2009 she and Picott released the collaborative album Sew Your Heart with Wires. Since that time, Shires has also performed and recorded with Jason Isbell & the 400 Unit, Devotchka, Chris Isaak, Thrift Store Cowboys, Blackberry Smoke, and Justin Townes Earle.

In 2011, she appeared in the movie Country Strong as one of the musicians backing singer Kelly Canter, played by Gwyneth Paltrow. During 2011, Shires began attending Sewanee: The University of the South, a small liberal arts university in Sewanee, Tennessee. She graduated with a Master of Fine Arts degree in poetry in 2017.

During a break from classes at Sewanee, in July 2011 following the release of her third album Carrying Lightning, Shires suffered a severe injury to her left ring finger while using a rope swing jumping into Saint Andrews Lake near the campus. The injury caused loss of feeling and muscle strength that nearly ended Shires’ fiddle playing career. Saying she drew inspiration from Billy Joe Shaver, who was missing two fingers, Shires eventually relearned her violin fingering through two years of rehabilitation.

On the strength of Carrying Lightning, Shires was named Artist of the Year 2011 by Texas Music magazine, appearing on the publication's Winter 2012 cover. Down Fell the Doves followed Carrying Lightning in August 2013, and My Piece of Land was released in September 2016. The latter proved to be Shires' breakthrough, gaining her a nomination from the Americana Music Association.

Shires won the Emerging Artist of the Year Award at the 2017 Americana Music Honors & Awards. That year, she supported John Prine on his worldwide tour alongside Isbell for select dates. Shires announced that she was working on a new album, To The Sunset, which was due for release in August 2018 and which, like My Piece of Land, would be produced by Dave Cobb. Isbell revealed on Twitter that Gillian Welch and David Rawlings will make a guest appearance. As a member of the 400 Unit, Shires won the Grammy Award for Best Americana Album for The Nashville Sound. Shires contributed to The Tree of Forgiveness, the 2018 album by John Prine. To The Sunset was released on August 3, 2018.

After researching the lack of airplay women artists received on American country radio stations, which an academic paper found had dropped to less than twenty percent of songs played by 2018, Shires formed the country supergroup The Highwomen, along with Brandi Carlile, Natalie Hemby, and Maren Morris. "Redesigning Women" was the first single from their self-titled debut album released on September 6, 2019. Following her 2021 holiday album For Christmas, Shires released her eighth solo album Take It Like a Man on July 26, 2022.

Shires announced her ninth album, Nobody's Girl on July 18, 2025 alongside the release of its lead single "A Way It Goes". It was recorded at Sound Emporium Studios, produced by Lawrence Rothman, and released on September 26, 2025.

In the summer of 2026, Shires opened the Sweet Judy Blue Eyes: Farewell Tour show at Tanglewood. Appearing along with Shires to sing for Judy Collins during her farewell performance at the venue were Madeleine Peyroux, Mary Chapin Carpenter and Rosanne Cash.

== Musical style ==
David Menconi of the magazine Spin said that Shires "sings [...] like an earthbound Emmylou Harris", and her vocals have been likened to those of Dolly Parton. Reviewers have variously described a "catch" or "quaver", musically called vibrato, in Shire's voice that allows her to express vulnerability or apprehension, or as Jewly Hight writing for NPR explained, acts "as a subtle emotive tool or punctuation in her storytelling, (which) feels like an electrical charge shuddering through the live wire of her voice". The imagery in her songwriting has been compared to that of Tom Waits. Although her principal instrument is the fiddle, she also plays the ukulele.

== Personal life ==
Shires began dating fellow musician Jason Isbell in 2011. The couple married on February 23, 2013 and had their first child on September 1, 2015. She was previously in a relationship with singer Rod Picott. In December 2023, Isbell filed for divorce from Shires. Their divorce was finalized in March 2025.

== Discography ==
=== Solo albums ===
==== As accompanist ====
- Being Brave (2005)

==== As singer-songwriter ====
- West Cross Timbers (2009)
- Carrying Lightning (2011)
- Down Fell the Doves (2013)
- My Piece of Land (2016)
- To the Sunset (2018)
- For Christmas (2021)
- Take It Like a Man (2022)
- Nobody's Girl (2025)

=== With Rod Picott ===
- Sew Your Heart with Wires (2009)

=== With Jason Isbell ===
- Here We Rest (2011)
- Southeastern (2013)
- Something More Than Free (2015)
- Sea Songs (2015 single)
- "If I Needed You" – on Gentle Giants: The Songs of Don Williams (2017)
- The Nashville Sound (2017)
- Reunions (2020)
- Georgia Blue (2021)
- Weathervanes (2023)

=== With the Highwomen ===
- The Highwomen (2019)

=== With Bobbie Nelson ===
- Loving You (2023)

=== Other appearances ===
- City Boys (2004) – Andy Hedges
- Sweeten the Distance (2011) – Neal Casal
- Nothing's Gonna Change the Way You Feel About Me Now – Justin Townes Earle
- Light Fighter – Thrift Store Cowboys
- Welding Burns – Rod Picott
- Agnostic Hymns & Stoner Fables – Todd Snider
- Oh Be Joyful – Shovels & Rope
- Mutt – Cory Branan
- Burn. Flicker. Die. – American Aquarium
- I Can't Love You Any Less – High Cotton: Tribute to Alabama (2013)
- For Better, or Worse – John Prine (2016)
- Adios – Cory Branan (2017)
- Accomplice One – Tommy Emmanuel (2018)
- The Tree of Forgiveness – John Prine (2018)
- Find a Light – Blackberry Smoke (2018)
- Southern Ground Sessions – Blackberry Smoke – (2018)
- What You See Ain't Always What You Get – Luke Combs (fiddle on "Without You")
- Where the Light Goes – Matchbox Twenty (2023)

== Awards and nominations ==
Year	Association	Category	Nominated work	Result
2017	Americana Music Honors & Awards	Emerging Artist of the Year	Amanda Shires	Won
2018	Grammy Awards	Best Americana Album	The Nashville Sound	Won
2018	UK Americana Awards	International Album of the Year	The Nashville Sound	Won
2018	Americana Music Honors & Awards	Duo/Group of the Year	Jason Isbell & the 400 Unit	Won
2019	Americana Music Honors & Awards	Album of the Year	To the Sunset	Nominated
2020	Academy of Country Music Awards	Group of the Year	The Highwomen	Nominated
2020	CMT Awards	Group Video of the Year	"Crowded Table"	Nominated

The song "When you Need a Train It Never Comes" from Carrying Lightning was ranked the fifth best song of 2011 by American Songwriter.
