= Nobody's Girl (album) =

Studio album by Amanda Shires
- Released: September 26, 2025
- Studios: Sound Emporium (Nashville); Rothman Caverns (Laurel Canyon)
- Genre: Americana
- Length: 51:01
- Label: ATO
- Producer: Lawrence Rothman

Amanda Shires chronology
| Loving You (2023) | Nobody's Girl (2025) |

Singles from Nobody's Girl
- 1. "A Way It Goes" Released: July 15, 2025; 2. "Piece of Mind" Released: August 26, 2025; 3. "Lately" Released: September 23, 2025

Nobody's Girl is the ninth solo studio album by American singer-songwriter Amanda Shires. Produced by Lawrence Rothman and recorded at Sound Emporium Studios in Nashville, Tennessee and Rothman Caverns in Laurel Canyon, Los Angeles, it was released on September 26, 2025, through ATO Records. It was preceded by the singles "A Way It Goes", "Piece of Mind", and "Lately". Following from Shires' high-profile divorce from Jason Isbell, the album explores themes of heartbreak, loss, resilience, self-discovery, and empowerment.

== Background ==
The album was announced on July 18, 2025. Shires re-teamed with Lawrence Rothman, who produced her previous album Take It Like a Man (2022), for the project, and explained that “Nobody’s Girl is what came after the wreckage, the silence, the rebuilding. It’s about standing in the aftermath of a life you thought would last forever and realizing no one is coming to save you.”

Shires married singer-songwriter and musician Jason Isbell in February 2013 and gave birth to their daughter in 2015. Isbell filed for divorce in December 2023, and it was finalised in March 2025. Shires explained that she and Rothman had initially begun recording the follow-up to Take It Like a Man prior to her divorce and that “not a lot” from those original sessions was used when the duo reconvened to continue work of the album. Shires used songwriting to help her work through her "big feelings" during this challenging period, theorising that she'd written over thirty songs for the project, and then filtered down to the thirteen that ended up on the album explaining, “in the end you decide, what is the story that you feel comfortable telling? Or that you feel comfortable with your child reading later? You know, I never want to cause harm at all. But I also don’t want to not have my opportunity to be true to myself. And that’s how I decided which songs made the collection in the end.” She also initially aimed to steer away from making a "divorce record" until Rothman and Shooter Jennings convinced her that it would be disingenuous to not acknowledge the hard parts of her life.

Of how her divorce influenced the content of the album, Shires stated, “I have always used music as a way to explain what’s going on in my life to myself. And it was a big transition to go from, you know, having been in a marriage for a long time and to suddenly find that I’m not. It takes a lot of learning and self-reflection and, for me, a lot of time to process. In the processing, the music came about, and most all of that was a really hard, bad time. There were some moments of joy, as there tends to be, but we never focus on those.” Shires also felt it was important to highlight her healing journey on the album, explain that, “there’s the transformation from the impossibility of it while you’re going through it, feeling like you’ll never be hopeful or happy again — that is just completely not true, and completely what your brain tells you when you go through it… I’m happy, and everything works out in the end. So I want to focus on the part that’s beautiful about going through hard things.”

=== Singles ===
Discussing lead single, "A Way It Goes", which was released alongside the album announcement, Shires stated, “I wrote that in two hours. It was kind of a response to not only Lawrence, but also a reaction to folks asking me what happened or wanting more details than I felt I wanted to share. I don’t ever want it to sound like I was some kind of victim to something that’s so universal — people dealing with loss or grief or letting go of things. I want them to see me when I’m fully healed, kind of like the song says.”

"Piece of Mind", the album's second single, was released on August 26, 2025. Of the rock-driven song, Shires explained, “this one came when I was finally done being polite about pain. I wrote this song because I never got closure. ‘Piece of Mind’ became the place I said everything I didn't get to say. Writing it gave me an ending. Not tidy. Not bitter. Just mine.”

"Lately", the third single, was released on September 23, 2025. Shires described the song as, “about that in-between place where you’re not okay, but you’re not falling apart either…you’re just wandering, looking for something to hold on to. It’s cinematic but grounded. It’s fighting the blues with more blues and searching the sky for a silver lining.”

== Critical reception ==
Robert Christgau gave Nobody's Girl an "A" and wrote of Shires:

It's the rare female country star who’s more ingenue than belter—Kacey Musgraves and Megan Moroney come to mind but not many others. And it’s the rarer country singer of any gender who can reel off lyrics of this quality. Her tempos moderate, her pitch elevated, her enunciation crystalline, Jason Isbell’s ex is an exception so impressive you can only hope they didn’t split up because she can write rings around him that don’t wind up on his finger.

== Track listing ==
All tracks are written by Amanda Shires, except "Invocation", "A Way It Goes", and "Friend Zone" (written with Lawrence Rothman) and "Lately" (written with Peter Levin).

Nobody's Girl track listing
| No. | Title | Length |
|---|---|---|
| 1. | "Intro: Invocation" | 1:16 |
| 2. | "A Way It Goes" | 4:44 |
| 3. | "Maybe I" | 4:21 |
| 4. | "The Details" | 4:27 |
| 5. | "Living" | 3:28 |
| 6. | "Lose It for a While" | 5:09 |
| 7. | "Piece of Mind" | 3:52 |
| 8. | "Streetlights and Stars" | 3:52 |
| 9. | "Lately" | 3:15 |
| 10. | "Friend Zone" | 4:17 |
| 11. | "Strange Dreams" | 4:00 |
| 12. | "Can't Hold Your Breath" | 4:46 |
| 13. | "Not Feeling Anything" | 3:28 |
| Total length: | | 51:01 |

== Personnel ==
Credits adapted from the album's liner notes.

=== Musicians ===
- Amanda Shires – fiddle (tracks 1, 3–13), vocals (2–13), strings (2), ukulele (4, 6), tenor guitar (13)
- Lawrence Rothman – piano (1, 2), guitar (2–13), synthesizers (2, 4–13), drums (6, 13), bass (6), choir vocals (12)
- Joe Kennedy – guitar (2, 7, 10), piano (7, 10)
- Pino Palladino – bass (2, 10)
- Jay Bellerose – drums (2, 10)
- Fred Eltringham – drums (3–5, 7–9, 11, 12)
- Zach Setchfield – acoustic guitar (3–5), guitar (8, 9, 12)
- Dominic Davis – bass (3–6, 8, 9, 11, 12)
- Peter Levin – keyboards (3, 8, 9, 11, 12), piano (4, 5, 9)
- Austin Hoke – strings (3, 8, 10, 12)
- Kristen Weber – strings (3, 8, 10, 12)
- Timbre Cierpke – harp (3, 4)
- Josh Grange – steel guitar (3)
- Jimbo Hart – bass (7, 13)
- Jordan Lehning – string arrangement (8, 10, 12)
- Jamison Hollister – steel guitar (11)
- Yves Rothman – synthesizers (13)

=== Technical and visuals ===
- Lawrence Rothman – production, mixing, additional engineering
- Louis Remenapp – engineering
- Nate Haessly – engineering
- Pete Lyman – mastering
- Daniel Bacigalupi – mastering assistance, engineering assistance
- Grant Wilson – engineering assistance
- Diana Walsh – engineering assistance
- Nick Rowe – additional engineering
- Yves Rothman – additional engineering
- Joshua Black Wilkins – photography
- Brett Warren – photography
- Amanda Shires – art direction
- Rob Vargas – design

== Charts ==
Chart performance for Nobody's Girl
| Chart (2025) | Peak position |
|---|---|
| UK Americana Albums (Official Charts) | 23 |
| UK Independent Albums (Official Charts) | 46 |
| US Top Album Sales (Billboard) | 35 |
