= Bom Bom Bom =

Bom Bom Bom may refer to:

- "Bom Bom Bom", a song by Living Things from their 2005 album Ahead of the Lions
- "Bom Bom Bom", a song by Roy Kim from his 2013 album Love Love Love
- "Bom, Bom, Bom, Bom, Esso Blue!", an Esso advertising song from the 1950s through to the 1970s

== See also ==
- "Bom Bom", a 2012 song by Sam and the Womp
