= My Piece of Land =

Studio album by Amanda Shires
- Released: September 16, 2016
- Studio: RCA Studio A (Nashville)
- Genre: Country; Americana
- Length: 33:42
- Label: BMG
- Producer: Dave Cobb

Amanda Shires chronology
Down Fell the Doves (2013)	My Piece of Land (2016)	To the Sunset (2018)

My Piece of Land is the fifth studio album by American singer-songwriter Amanda Shires. The album was recorded in Nashville at RCA Studio A and produced by Dave Cobb. Released on September 16, 2016 on the BMG label, the album features poetic explorations of home, relationships, and anxiety. The album was widely praised, with reviewers remarking on both the efficiency and the poignancy of the songs by the Sewanee graduated writer.

== Composition and recording ==
All of the songs on My Piece of Land except "Mineral Wells", a remake from 2009's West Cross Timbers, were written in the last two months of Shires' pregnancy with her daughter Mercy Isbell. Shires spent the first part of 2015 working, including touring, and appearing on the Late Show with David Letterman with then-husband Jason Isbell. She stopped travelling at 33 weeks of the pregnancy and used the time to write and record the songs on My Piece of Land.

In interviews about the recording, Shires credited both producer Dave Cobb and Jason Isbell for their help realizing the songs the way she imagined. Cobb helped turn her descriptions of the songs' moods into reality, with Shires saying "He can sort through the abstract and the vagueness that words can sometimes bring when you're trying to talk about music. When you say, 'In my mind, this is a spacey, moody song, and it feels like you're in a dark room,' he knows how to translate that into sound without making you feel like an imbecile." Shires used Isbell's advice when working out sounds:

Sometimes it’s hard for me to find a chord because I’m a fiddle player, and it’s a melodic instrument. I do my best at the tenor guitar and the ukulele, but sometimes I’m like, this is the note that I hear and I can’t find the chord that fits this note. What is it? So he’ll sit around for fifteen minutes and try every chord he can think of until we get to the right one. In ‘Harmless,’ the chord going into the bridge—the B flat—he helped me find that chord.

Shires at the time considered My Piece of Land her "most cohesive album to date" due to the focus brought on by attending graduate classes at Sewanee School of Letters while completing a Master of Fine Arts degree, which she finished in 2017. She was featured on the school's website, where she gave further insight into how pursuing her degree improved her songwriting skills.

== Critical reception ==
Professional ratings
Review scores
Source	Rating
Paste	7.9/10
NPR	Positive
PopMatters	8/10
American Songwriter	3.5/5

Reviewers commenting of My Piece of Land recognized Shires' concentration on approaching relationships and finding home – with her own nascent definitions of the concepts – while about to deliver her first child. Writing for NPR, Ann Powers described how the singer "has a way of pausing over a note and pulling it in a few directions", seeing as Shires' singing "really shines in subtle gradations, in the natural environment where the voice warbles and catches, and the mind adjusts, opens up and leans toward love."

The Lubbock Avalanche-Journal described Shires' distinctive vocals as "the voice of a performer fully invested in her material", as writer Steven Wine appreciated the efficiency of the songs, finding "not an ounce of flab in the 34-minute set". Journalist Kelly McCartney found the "playful and poised" album consistent throughout, remarking "evocative imagery litters My Piece of Land, song after song." Writing in Relix, Lee Zimmerman concluded that with the subject matter, Shires presents "a poignant collection to be sure, but the optimism in Shires’ delivery mutes any sense of remorse, making the material sound tender rather than troubled, offering a wistful view of an imperfect past that allows hope for the future."

== Track listing ==
All songs by Amanda Shires, except where noted.

1. "The Way It Dimmed" - 2:11
2. "Slippin'" - 2:39
3. "Harmless" - 3:53
4. "Pale Fire" (Shires, Jason Isbell) - 3:16
5. "Nursery Rhyme" - 2:32
6. "My Love (The Storm)" (Shires, Isbell) - 3:37
7. "When You're Gone" - 3:06
8. "Mineral Wells" - 4:11
9. "I Know What It's Like" - 4:38
10. "You Are My Home" - 3:39

== Personnel ==
as listed in the CD booklet

Musicians

- Amanda Shires - vocals, violin, tenor guitar, ukulele
- Jason Isbell - harmony vocals, guitars, pianos
- Derry deBorja - keyboard
- Paul Slivka - bass
- Paul Griffith - drums
- Dave Cobb - guitar

Production

- Dave Cobb - producer, mixing
- Matt Ross-Spang - engineering
- Pete Lyman - mastering
- Anderson East - sequencing
- Josh Wool - photography
- Kelly Amber Garcia - design
