= Habeas Corpus (album) =

Studio album by Living Things
- Released: February 17, 2009
- Studios: Hansa Tonstudio, Berlin
- Genre: Indie rock
- Length: 40:00
- Label: Jive
- Producer: Michael Ilbert

Professional ratings
Aggregate scores
Source	Rating
Metacritic	71% link
Review scores
Source	Rating
AllMusic	link
PopMatters	link
Robert Christgau	A− link
Rolling Stone	link

Habeas Corpus is the third album from American rock band Living Things. The album was recorded over a period of nine months in Hansa Tonstudio in Berlin. Michael Ilbert produced Habeas Corpus, unlike the previous record, Ahead of the Lions, which was produced by Steve Albini.

== Track listing ==
All tracks written by Living Things, except for "Let It Rain" and "Oxygen", written alongside Max Martin. All tracks produced by Living Things and Michael Ilbert.

Habeas Corpus track listing
No.	Title	Length
1.	"Brass Knuckles"	3:15
2.	"Mercedes Marxist"	3:58
3.	"Let It Rain"	3:52
4.	"Oxygen"	3:14
5.	"Cost of Living"	3:44
6.	"Island in Your Heart"	4:24
7.	"Snake Oil Man"	4:38
8.	"Post Millennium Extinction Blues"	3:39
9.	"Dirty Bombs"	3:07
10.	"Shake Your Shimmy"	3:17
11.	"The Kingdom Will Fall"	2:51

== Personnel ==
- Lillian Berlin - vocals, guitar
- Eve Berlin - bass guitar
- Bosh Berlin - drums
- Cory Becker - guitar
