= Adam Carroll (American musician) =

Americana singer-songwriter

- Born: 1975 (age 50–51); Tyler, Texas, United States
- Genres: Americana, folk rock, alternative country
- Occupations: Singer, songwriter and guitarist
- Instruments: Acoustic guitar
- Years active: 1996–present
- Labels: Down Hole Records, Blue Com Music, South Central Music
- Website: adamcarroll.com

Adam Carroll (born 1975) is an Americana singer-songwriter who was born in Tyler, Texas, and has spent most of his career in the Austin, Texas area. Carroll has nine solo albums to his credit, all indie releases, beginning with 2000's South of Town. His songwriting, which focuses on life in Texas, Louisiana and Oklahoma, is influenced by the work of Texas greats such as Guy Clark and Townes Van Zandt. He was honored in 2016 with the release Highway Prayer: A Tribute to Adam Carroll, which features recordings of his songs by some of Austin's leading Americana music artists, including Slaid Cleaves, James McMurtry, Terri Hendrix and Tim Easton.

== Biography ==
Carroll was born in 1975 in Tyler, Texas. His father is an attorney and his mother, a musician and choir director. He studied classical guitar and creative writing at Tyler Junior College. He left college in his early 20s, around 1995, and began performing in the Austin-Dallas-San Antonio area, initially in coffeehouses and later at pubs and clubs throughout the region. In 1998, he released his debut South of Town which was followed by Lookin' Out the Screen Door in 2000 and Adam Carroll Live in 2002. All three were produced by Grammy Award-winning producer Lloyd Maines.

While on the road, Carroll opened for some of East Texas's top musicians, who took notice of his song writing and began performing his work. Hayes Carll was the first to record a cover of one of Carroll's songs, "Take Me Away", on his 2005 album Little Rock. The song, co-written by fellow singer-songwriter John Evans, appeared on the soundtrack of the 2010 film Country Strong. Other covers followed, including Slaid Cleaves with "Race Car Joe" on Unsung in 2006 and Band of Heathens with "Maple of Tears" (co-written with band members Ed Jurdi and Gordy Quist) on their studio debut Band of Heathens in 2008.

In 2005, Carroll recorded his third studio album, Far Away Blues, which was followed three years later by Old Town Rock 'n Roll. He released another live album in 2010, Live at Flipnotics, recorded at an iconic Austin coffeehouse that has since closed. In 2014, Carroll put out his fifth studio release, Let It Choose You.

In April 2019, Carroll released his first solo album in five years, I Walked In Them Shoes. Then in August 2019, he and his wife singer songwriter Chris Carroll made their recording debut as a duo on Good Farmer. Chris plays mandolin and guitar on the album, while Adam plays rhythm guitar, lead guitar and harmonica. Both of the 2019 releases were produced by Lloyd Maines.

== Highway Prayer: A Tribute to Adam Carroll ==
In 2016, fourteen Texas artists contributed interpretations of Carroll's songs to the album Highway Prayer: A Tribute to Adam Carroll, which was released by Eight 30 Records in late October. Participating in the homage were James McMurtry on "Screen Door", Hayes Carll on "Girl with the Dirty Hair", Slaid Cleaves on "South of Town", Band of Heathens on "Oklahoma Gypsy Shuffler", Tim Easton and Aaron Lee Tasjan on "Black Flag Blues", and Terri Hendrix on "Red Bandana Blues". Carroll himself recorded the album's 15th song, the closing track "My Only Good Shirt".

The tribute reached the Americana Music Association charts and caught the attention of the regional and national music press. No Depression described the release as one of "the year's three or four best folk albums." Referring to Carroll's talent as a songwriter, Rolling Stone remarked, "It speaks volumes that McMurtry and Hayes Carll and many more all contribute to (this) new homage to Adam Carroll." And Elmore Magazine summed up the attraction of the album's selections: "Carroll's remarkable knack for creating stunning, visceral portraits of everyday Americans."

== Discography ==
- South of Town (1998)
- Looking Out The Screen Door (2000)
- Adam Carroll Live (2002)
- Far Away Blues (2005)
- Old Town Rock n Roll (2008)
- Live at Flipnotics (2010)
- Let It Choose You (2014)
- I Walked In Them Shoes (2019)

=== Collaborations ===
- Hard Times with Michael O'Connor (2010)
- Good Farmer with Chris Carroll (2019)
