= Black Skies in Broad Daylight =

Studio album by Living Things
- Released: August 17, 2004 (US), May 3, 2004 (UK)
- Genre: Rock and roll, punk rock
- Length: 49:51
- Label: DreamWorks Records
- Producer: Steve Albini

Living Things chronology
Turn In Your Friends and Neighbors (2003)	Black Skies in Broad Daylight (2004)	Resight Your Rights (2004)

Black Skies in Broad Daylight is the first full-length album by American punk rock band Living Things. It was released by DreamWorks Records on May 3, 2004, in the UK, and on August 17, 2004, in the US. It was produced by Steve Albini. CMJ described the voice of the band's lead singer, Lillian Berlin, as a "snarling Iggy-inspired baritone" and the album's songs as "scathing socio-political commentaries."

Professional ratings
Review scores
Source	Rating
AllMusic	4/5 stars
Cokemachineglow	26%
Drowned in Sound	4/10
Hot Press	(mixed)
MusicOMH	(mixed)
PopMatters	(favorable)
Robert Christgau	A–

== Track listing ==
1. Bombs Below
2. March In Daylight
3. End Gospel
4. New Year
5. No New Jesus
6. I Owe
7. Born Under The Gun
8. On All Fours
9. Keep It Till You Fold
10. Dead Deer
11. Standard Oil Trust
12. For Tomorrow We Die I Wish The Best For You
13. Body Worship

== Personnel ==
- Steve Albini – engineer
- Bosh Berlin – drums
- Eve Berlin (aka Yves Rothman) – bass guitar
- Lillian Berlin – guitar, vocals
- Bryn Bridenthal – publicity
- Mike Dewdney – booking
- Ben Grosse – mixing
- Beth Halper – A&R
- Lij – engineer, mixing, producer
- Jennifer Ross – coordination
- Floria Sigismondi – creative director, photography
