= Living Things (band) =

American band

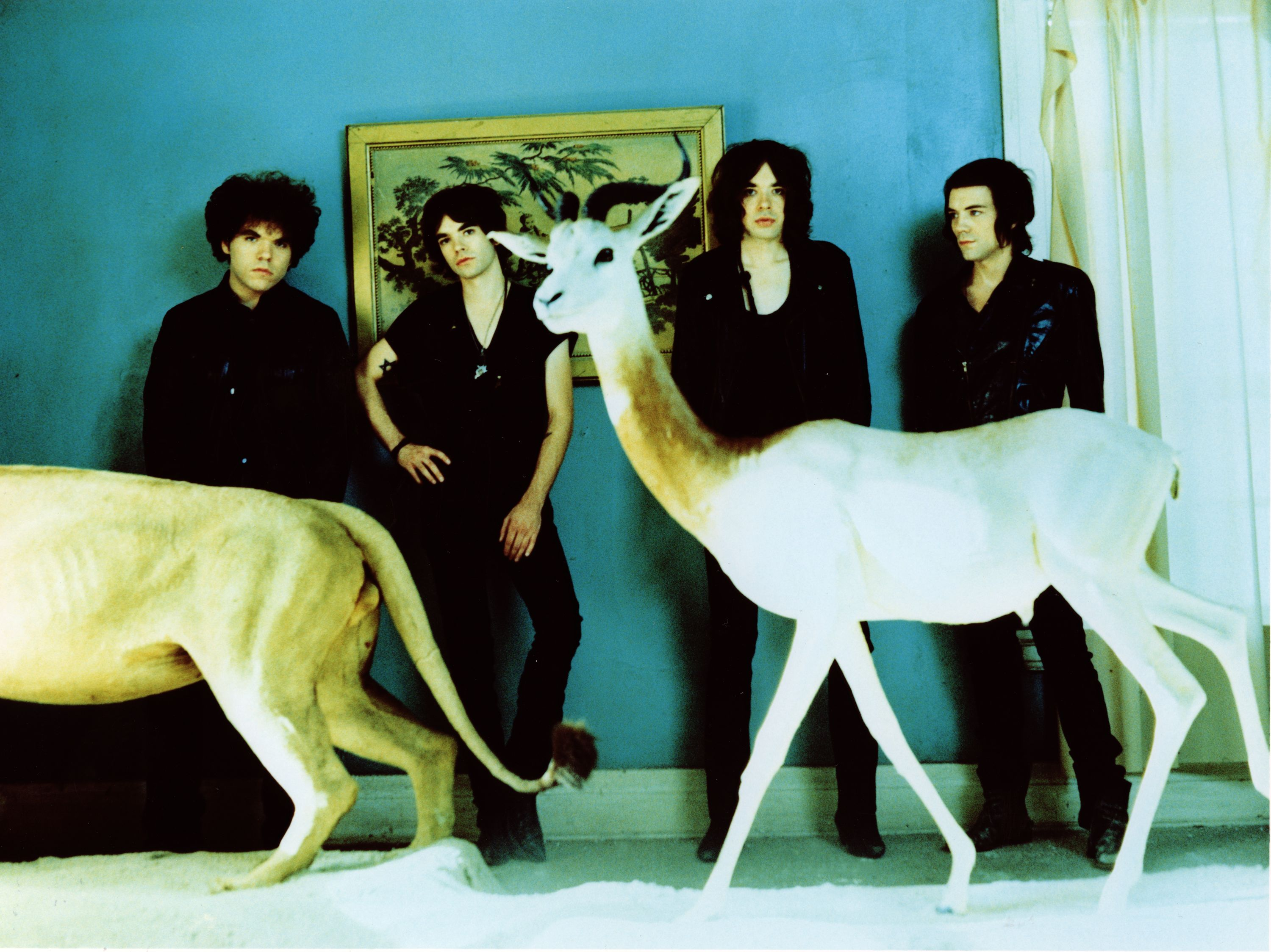

Background information
- Origin: St. Louis, Missouri, USA
- Genres: Alternative rock, garage rock, psychobilly, punk rock, dub
- Years active: 2001–2011, 2020–present
- Labels: DreamWorks, Universal, Jive
- Members: Lillian Berlin; Eve Berlin (Yves Rothman); Bosh Berlin; Cory Becker
- Website: http://www.livingthingsband.com/

Living Things is an American punk rock band from St. Louis, Missouri. The band consists of the brothers Lillian Berlin (vocals/guitar), Eve Berlin (bass), and Bosh Berlin (drums), and Cory Becker (guitar).

== History ==
Brothers Lillian Berlin (born Lawrence Rothman), Eve Berlin (born Yves Rothman), and Bosh Berlin (born Joshua Rothman) grew up in the suburbs of St. Louis. Future Living Things guitarist Cory Becker was a childhood friend. The band self-released two early EPs produced by Steve Albini, and gained the attention of several record labels. They first signed with DreamWorks Records, which released the album Black Skies in Broad Daylight in 2004, but the label then went bankrupt. Geffen Records also spent money to develop the band but then dropped them due to their controversial, politicized concert performances. They eventually signed with Jive Records.

Living Things released the critically acclaimed album Ahead of the Lions in 2005. Produced by Steve Albini, the album ranked #42 on Rolling Stone Magazine's top 50 albums of the year. The single "Bom Bom Bom" reached #21 on the Billboard Alternative Songs chart. Lillian Berlin published the book Postmortem Bliss via Apocrypha Press, describing his teenage years in which he was diagnosed with attention-deficit hyperactivity disorder and became addicted to anti-depressants. The book was adapted into a short film directed by Floria Sigismondi and broadcast on Turner Classic Movies in 2006.

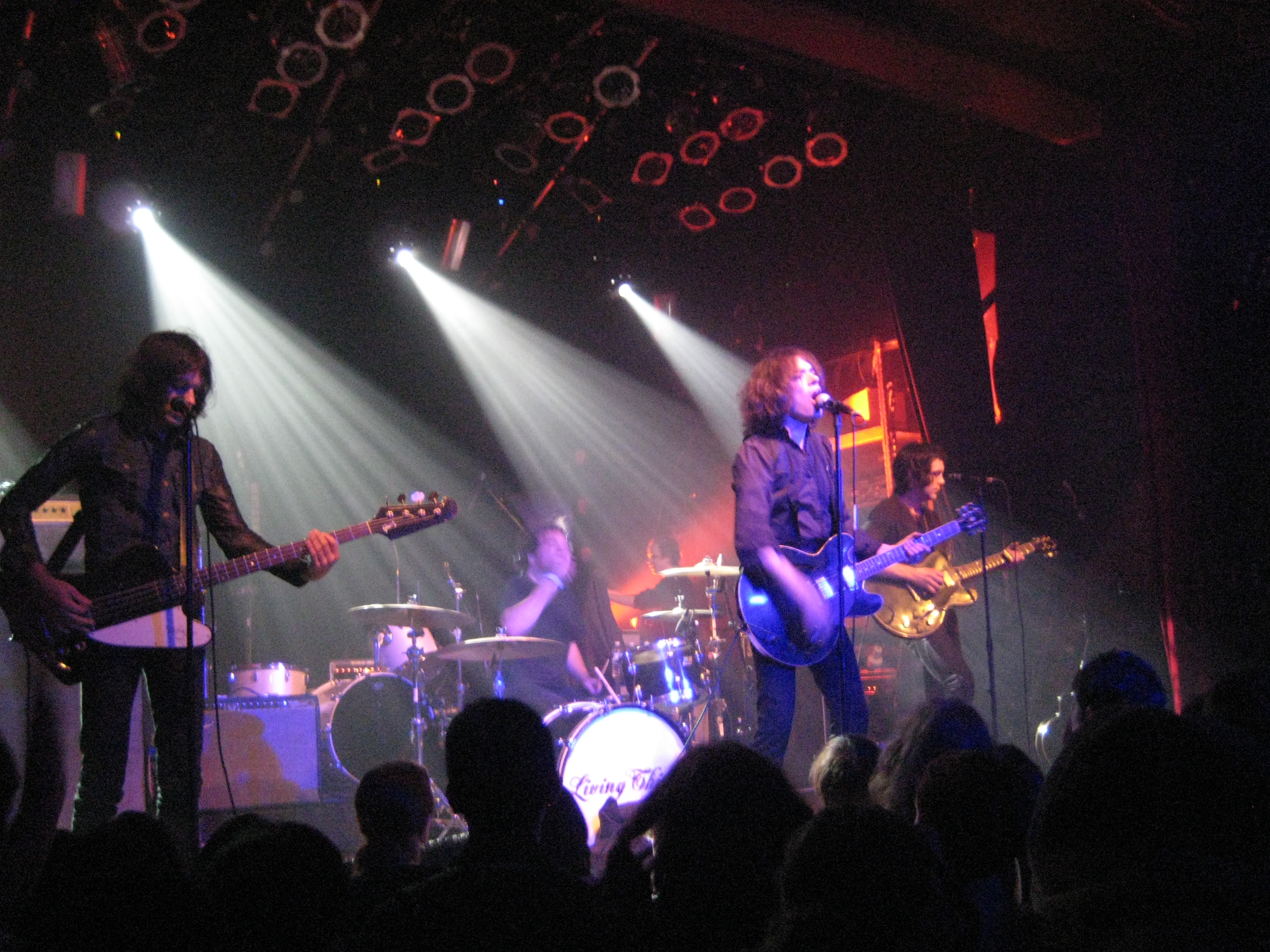
Living Things performing at the Mod Club Theatre in 2009.

Living Things released the album Habeas Corpus in 2009. Also in 2009, Eve Berlin participated in a photo shoot with fashion designer Roberto Cavalli. In 2010 Lillian Berlin composed the original score for the film The Runaways. Living Things self-released a series of songs in 2010 and announced an upcoming triple album, though that album never appeared. They released a controversial video for the song "Har Megiddo" featuring a man having sexual intercourse with his car. Lillian Berlin stated that Ray Kurzweil's philosophy on "singularity" and society's love of machines were the inspirations for the video.

The band ended regular activities in 2011. Lillian Berlin launched a solo career as a singer-songwriter under their given name Lawrence Rothman. In January 2020 Living Things regrouped for the single "Take No Prisoners", a collaboration with Sunflower Bean for the film The Turning. In May 2020 Living Things released their first new music in more than ten years, the three-song EP Shapeshifter, which was co-produced by Steve Albini.

== Members ==
- Lillian Berlin - vocals, guitar
- Eve Berlin - bass
- Bosh Berlin - drums
- Cory Becker - guitar

== Discography ==
- ADHD (2001)
- Turn in Your Friends and Neighbors (EP, 2002)
- Resight Your Rights (EP, 2004)
- Black Skies in Broad Daylight (2004)
- Ahead of the Lions (2005)
- Habeas Corpus (2009)
- Shapeshifter (EP, 2020)
