= To the Sunset =

2018 studio album by Amanda Shires

To The Sunset

Studio album by Amanda Shires
- Released: August 3, 2018
- Genre: Country; Americana
- Length: 32:20
- Label: Silver Knife Records
- Producer: Dave Cobb

Amanda Shires chronology
My Piece of Land (2016)	To The Sunset (2018)	For Christmas (2021)

To The Sunset is the sixth studio album by American singer-songwriter Amanda Shires. The album was recorded in Nashville at RCA Studio A and produced by Dave Cobb. Released on August 3, 2018 on the Silver Knife label, the album adds a variety of styles including rock and pop to Shires' folk songs, and was reviewed positively for writing that takes on female ambition, relationship control, and mental health topics.

== Background ==
Shires' 2016 album My Piece of Land was her first recording with Dave Cobb, an Americana and southern United States music producer who prizes a singer's voice as "what people respond to the most". That album was written almost entirely during the last weeks of Shires' pregnancy with her daughter Mercy Isbell, and was critically lauded for Cobb's "uncluttered approach" and the efficiency of Shires' songwriting. In 2017, almost two years after the birth of her daughter, Shires continued working, stationing herself in her home in a walk-in closet with a paper shredder, to both divert her daughter from wanting to play along with her, and also to force herself to concentrate on material for a new album. During that year, the MeToo movement of women using social media to draw attention to pervasive sexual harassment provided additional incentive for Shires, who stated in an interview that described To The Sunset as a "toast" to #MeToo: “It’s a good time for it. We wanted to try and rock n’ roll our way through some of this.” The resulting album was recorded with a greater variety of rock and pop influence than the previous, sparser recording. Shires defended the approach as being against a stereotype: “If you are making an Americana record, and you’re a woman, you have to play acoustic instruments and be fucking sad all the time. I did not want to do that.”

== Reception ==
Cobb and Shires' then-husband Jason Isbell rejoined her to record To The Sunset. Reviewer Will Hermes in Rolling Stone confirmed Shires' shift in approach, writing the album contains "arrangements that stretch the definition of 'Americana' to the point of meaninglessness (Shires won the Best Emerging Artist trophy at last years Americana Music Awards). 'Parking Lot Pirouette' opens the set like an aerial shot, zooming in on a romantic moment outside a bar, framing it in cosmic terms against a 3/4 waltz pulse, with shivering organ clouds and trippy electric guitar from Isbell. It’s more Pink Floyd than Floyd Tillman." For National Public Radio, Jewly Hight wrote "during 'Break Out the Champagne,' Shires wryly relates an account of a female friend who was dumped by a dullard, only to realize that he'd never really satisfied her anyway: 'I'm rock and roll, and you're golf.' Hearing Shires spell that out is invigorating." Chuck Armstrong gave the recording high praise, writing "from the sonic landscapes to the writing, To the Sunset is a crowning achievement in Shires’ growing body of work."

=== Accolades ===
Year	Award	Nominated work	Result
2019	Americana Music Honors & Awards	Album of the Year	Nominated

== Track listing ==
All songs by Amanda Shires.

1. "Parking Lot Pirouette" - 3:32
2. "Swimmer'" - 2:54
3. "Leave It Alone" - 3:41
4. "Charms" - 2:33
5. "Eve's Daughter" - 3:10
6. "Break Out the Champagne" - 2:45
7. "Take on the Dark" - 3:01
8. "White Feather" - 3:34
9. "Mirror Mirror" - 2:47
10. "Wasn't I Paying Attention?" - 4:23

== Personnel ==
as listed in the CD digisleeve:

Musicians

- Amanda Shires - violin, vocals, ukulele, tenor guitar, autoharp
- Dave Cobb - bass, acoustic guitar
- Jerry Pentecost - drums
- Jason Isbell - acoustic guitars, electric guitars, bass
- Peter Levin - keyboards
- Derry deBorja - keyboards on "Charms"
- Zachary Setchfield - guitar on "Take on the Dark"
- Gillian Welch - vocals on "White Feather"

Production

- Dave Cobb - producer, mixing
- Pete Lyman - mastering
- Matt Ross-Spang - engineering
- Chris Taylor - assistant engineering
- Will Welch - creative direction
- Kelly Amber Garcia - design
- Elizaveta Porodina - photography
