= West Cross Timbers =

Studio album by Amanda Shires
- Released: January 27, 2009
- Studio: True Tone Studio
- Genre: Country; Americana
- Length: 43:02
- Producer: Amanda Shires, David Henry, Rod Picott

Amanda Shires chronology
| Being Brave (2005) | West Cross Timbers (2009) | Carrying Lightning (2011) |

West Cross Timbers is the second studio album by American singer-songwriter Amanda Shires. Self-published and released on January 27, 2009, the album was co-produced by Shires, David Henry, and Rod Picott. Cross Timbers is an ecological region which figured in slowing westward expansion by Americans in the 19th century. Profiling her for Lone Star Music Magazine, writer Christopher Oglesby praised Shires' songwriting and noted progression from her previous release, 2005's Being Brave. Shires has explained that West Cross Timbers is actually her singer-songwriter debut album, while the previous album was recorded as a voice and fiddle "calling card" for employers in the music industry.

== Track listing ==
All songs by Amanda Shires except (6, 9, 11):

1. "Upon Hearing Violins" - 3:05
2. "Unwanted Things" - 2:48
3. "I Kept Watch Like Doves" - 2:59
4. "Put Me To Bed" - 4:50
5. "Mineral Wells" - 3:52
6. "Angels and Acrobats" (Rod Picott) - 2:45
7. "Rings and Chains" - 4:18
8. "Days in Blankets" - 3:54
9. "Keep Them Dogs from Barkin'" (Amanda Shires, Lanny Fiel) - 2:22
10. "Mariann Leola" - 4:36
11. "Whispering" (John Schonberger, Richard Coburn, and Vincent Rose) - 3:00

== Personnel ==
as listed on the CD digipak:

=== Musicians ===
- Amanda Shires – fiddle, vocals, baritone ukulele
- David Henry – cello, pianos, organ
- Rod Picott – guitars
- Paul Slivka – bass
- Steve Byam – pedal steel
- Rich Malloy – drums and chain

=== Production ===
- Amanda Shires - producer
- David Henry - producer, recording, engineering, mixing
- Rod Picott - producer
- Jim Demain - mastering
- Joshua Black Wilkins - design
