= Slaid Cleaves =

American singer-songwriter

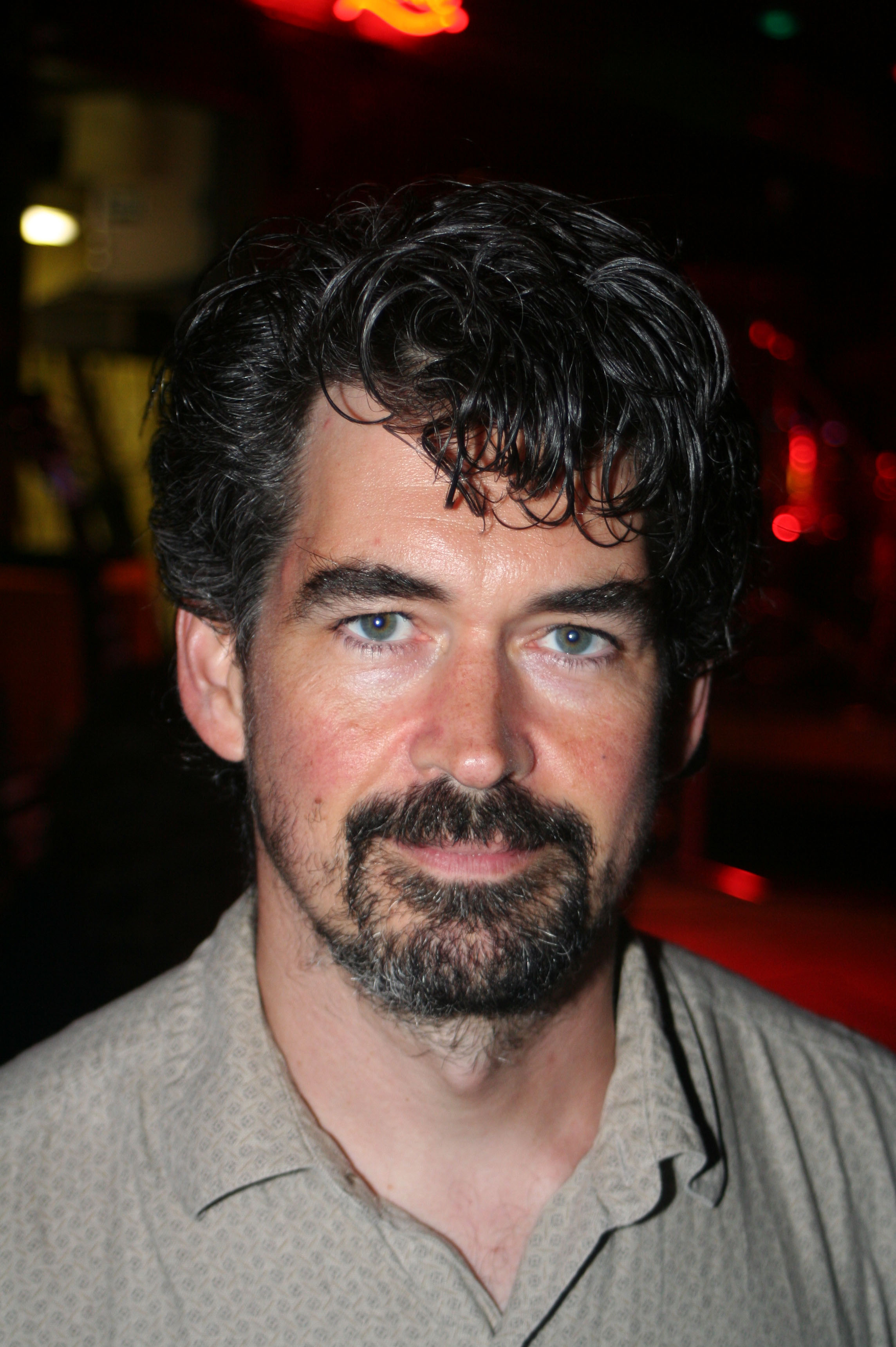

Background information
- Born: Richard Slaid Cleaves; June 9, 1964 (age 62); Washington, D.C., United States
- Genres: Folk, Country
- Occupation: Singer-songwriter
- Instruments: Vocals, guitar
- Years active: 1990–present

Richard Slaid Cleaves (born June 9, 1964) is an American folk singer-songwriter who has been performing extensively and recording albums in the Americana genre since the early 1990s. Raised in South Berwick, Maine, he has lived in the Austin, Texas, area since 1992.

Cleaves's musical roots extend back prior to his days playing in a high school "garage band" with his childhood friend Rod Picott. The two shared a love of music, especially Bruce Springsteen and named their band The Magic Rats, after a character in Springsteen's song "Jungleland."

He brought his love of American artists such as Woody Guthrie, Johnny Cash, Hank Williams, Chuck Berry, Bruce Springsteen, Tom Petty, Tom Waits, Creedence Clearwater Revival, and more with him to Cork, Ireland, where he spent his junior year of college. To help pass the time he learned how to play the songs on guitar and on November 18, 1985, he made his debut as a busker in Cork City, Ireland.

After several false starts he started to gain notice around Portland, Maine and in 1990 released his debut cassette, The Promise. Only a few songs off this album, "Sweet Summertime", "Lonesome Highway" and "Wrecking Ball" still occasionally get played in concert. The original tape has unfortunately been lost, and only copies remain.

That was followed a year later by Looks Good from the Road, recorded with his rock band, The Moxie Men, which featured Cleaves on lead vocals and acoustic guitar, his brother J. on bass, Mark Cousins on drums and Pip Walter on electric guitar, acoustic guitar, and vocals. By the end of the year they were the darlings of the Portland press and touted as one of the bands "most likely to succeed."

However, Cleaves's solo acoustic side took over and in 1991 he moved with his wife, Karen, to Austin, Texas. In 1992, he was a winner of the prestigious New Folk competition at the Kerrville Folk Festival, an award previously given to such artists as Nanci Griffith, Robert Earl Keen and Steve Earle.

Cleaves continued to work hard in Austin, playing various clubs around the city, touring, and continuing to hone his craft as a songwriter. In 1997, he recorded and released his first national album, No Angel Knows for the Rounder-Philo label, which has been his home ever since.

In 2000, Cleaves had an Americana charts hit with his album Broke Down and song of the same name. The title track was co-written with his childhood friend Picott, whom he grew up with in Maine.

Cleaves continued to gain notice with his follow-up album, 2004's Wishbones, appearing on the ESPN2 show Cold Pizza, and his music is praised by Nicholson Baker in his 2009 novel, The Anthologist.

In 2006 Cleaves released Unsung, a collection of songs written by other singer-songwriters including Graham Weber, J. J. Baron, Michael O'Connor (who often tours with Cleaves), Adam Carroll, and Nicole St. Pierre.

Dreamer: A Tribute to Kent Finlay, released in early 2016 on Austin-based Eight 30 Records, features Cleaves' version of "Lost," his co-write with Finlay.

Highway Prayer: A Tribute to Adam Carroll, released in late 2016 on Austin-based Eight 30 Records, features Cleaves' version of "South of Town."

Cleaves tours nationally performing solo and with a band in many configurations.

== Discography ==
- The Promise (1990 cassette)
- Looks Good From The Road (1991 cassette)
- The Promise/Looks Good From The Road (1998 CD release, plus three demo cuts, 1989)
- Life's Other Side (1992 cassette, 1997 CD release)
- For The Brave And Free (1993 cassette, 2001 CD release, plus six unreleased demos 1993–1995)
- No Angel Knows (1997)
- Broke Down (2000)
- Holiday Sampler 5-track EP (2001)
- Wishbones (2004)
- Unsung (2006)
- Everything You Love Will Be Taken Away (2009)
- Sorrow & Smoke: Live At The Horseshoe Lounge (2011)
- Still Fighting the War (2013)
- "Ghost on the Car Radio" (2017)
- Together Through the Dark (2023)

=== Other contributions ===
- Eklektikos Live (2005) – "Won't Get Fooled Again"
- Dark River: Songs From the Civil War Era (2011) – "The Streets of Laredo"
