= Thrift Store Cowboys =

- Origin: Lubbock, Texas, U.S.
- Genres: Alternative country, indie rock
- Years active: 1999–present
- Label: Independent
- Members: Daniel Fluitt; Colt Miller; Clint Miller; Cory Ames; Amanda Shires; Kris Killingsworth

Thrift Store Cowboys are an alternative country and indie rock band, formed in 1999, in Lubbock, Texas by Daniel Fluitt and Colt Miller. Presently the band also includes Clint Miller, Amanda Shires, Cory Ames, and Kris Killingsworth. The band was featured on KTTZ program 24 Frames.

The band has toured a significant portion of the United States, primarily from 2000 to 2010, playing in over 38 states. They have toured with acts such as DeVotchKa and Cory Branan. Additionally, Thrift Store Cowboys have shared a bill with Old 97s, the Flatlanders, Lucero, Joe Ely, and Centro-Matic.

== Members ==
- Daniel Fluitt: - Vocals, rhythm guitar, lap steel guitar, saw
- Colt Miller: - Electric & baritone guitar, accordion, banjo and pedal steel
- Clint Miller: - Bass guitar
- Cory Ames: - Wurlitzer, Rhodes, various
- Amanda "Pearl" Shires: - Fiddle, vocals
- Kris Killingsworth: - Drums, Glockenspiel, vocals

== Discography ==
- Nowhere With You (2001)
- The Great American Desert (2003)
- Lay Low While Crawling or Creeping (2006)
- 7" Vinyl Split w/ One Wolf (Mt. Inadale Records 2009)
- Light Fighter (2010)
- Lay Low While Crawling or Creeping - 10 Year Anniversary Vinyl (2016)

== Live recordings ==
- Live at Sabala's (2005) - Limited Edition live CD out of print
- Live at Taos Solar Music Fest (2007)
- Live at Luxury Wafers (2020)

== External links and sources ==
- Live and Breathing Sessions
- Thrift Store Cowboys Website
