= For Christmas =

Studio album by Amanda Shires
- Released: November 12, 2021
- Studio: Sound Emporium
- Genres: Country; Americana; Christmas
- Length: 38:38
- Label: Silver Knife Records
- Producer: Lawrence Rothman

Amanda Shires chronology
To the Sunset (2018)	For Christmas (2021)	Take It Like a Man (2022)

For Christmas is the seventh studio album by American singer-songwriter Amanda Shires. The album was recorded in Nashville at Sound Emporium and produced by Lawrence Rothman. Released on November 12, 2021 on the Silver Knife label, the album features several holiday-themed piano songs with Shires' non-traditional, often darkly humorous lyrics.

== Background ==
The influence of her mentor and friend John Prine, a renowned songwriter who died during the first weeks of the COVID-19 pandemic after contracting the disease, figured in Shires' collaboration with Lawrence Rothman. Rothman contacted Shires during a time when she was disappointed with musicians and producers who found faults with her voice. In an interview with Billboard, Shires remembered how Rothman's listening skills reminded her of Prine: "[Prine] listened to my songs, let me open shows for him, and we became great friends." Shires related that Rothman had tried to contact her in 2020, saying they listened to her songs and wanted her to sing a part on a track they were producing. She agreed, and after recording found that she and Rothman worked well together to get others to appreciate the sounds she was going for: "They taught me how to accept my voice and rediscover joy in the studio. They let me lead and were on my side about choices. Sometimes you go into a studio, you’re with a group of musicians and you might say something and they don’t hear you. Maybe it’s because you’re a woman, maybe it’s because you have a quiet voice. Whatever it is, Lawrence will come in there with their big, booming voice and say, ‘She wants to try it like this.’ Everyone listens."

== Track listing ==
All songs by Amanda Shires except 7, 8.

1. "Magic Ooooooh" (featuring The McCrary Sisters) - 4:13
2. "A Real Tree This Year" - 3:15
3. "Let's Get Away" (featuring The McCrary Sisters) - 3:21
4. "Home to Me" - 3:39
5. "Blame It on the Mistletoe" (featuring The McCrary Sisters) - 3:18
6. "Slow Falling Snow" - 3:39
7. "What Are You Doing New Year's Eve?" (Frank Loesser) - 2:28
8. "Silent Night" (Joseph Mohr, Franz Gruber, Amanda Shires) - 4:13
9. "Gone for Christmas" - 3:52
10. "Wish for You" - 3:28
11. "Always Christmas Around Here" (featuring Lawrence Rothman) - 3:12

== Personnel ==
as listed in the CD digisleeve:

Musicians

- Amanda Shires - vocals, fiddle, violin
- Pat Buchanan - guitars
- Fred Eltringham - drums
- Jimbo Hart - bass
- Peter Levin - keyboards
- Art Edmainston - tenor sax
- Kirk Smothers - baritone sax
- Marc Franklin - trumpet
- Jason J. Yasinsky - trombone
- Lawrence Rothman - guitar

The McCrary Sisters

- Ann McCrary
- Regina McCrary
- Alfreda McCrary

Production

- Lawrence Rothman - producer, mixing
- Pete Lyman - mastering
- Lewis Remenapp - engineering
