= Ahead of the Lions =

Studio album by Living Things
- Released: October 4, 2005
- Genre: Alternative rock, glam rock, garage rock
- Length: 42:30
- Label: Jive Records
- Producer: Living Things and Lij Shaw

Living Things chronology
Resight Your Rights (2004)	Ahead of the Lions (2005)	Habeas Corpus (2009)

Professional ratings
Aggregate scores
Source	Rating
Metacritic	72/100
Review scores
Source	Rating
AllMusic	4/5 stars
IGN	7.6/10
Pitchfork	5.8/10
PopMatters	8/10 stars
Robert Christgau	A−
Rolling Stone	4/5 stars
Stylus	B+

Ahead of the Lions is an album by rock band Living Things, released on October 4, 2005. The first single is the song "Bom Bom Bom" was featured in a Cingular commercial promoting an iTunes-compatible phone.

Some of the songs that would eventually be recorded for the Ahead of the Lions album originated from the band members' childhood. The album was recorded by Steve Albini (Nirvana, PJ Harvey, Pixies) and produced by Living Things and Lij Shaw in the Berlin Family Basement in their hometown of St. Louis in February 2005.

== Reception ==
The single "Bom Bom Bom" reached #21 on the Billboard Alternative Songs chart in 2006. As noted by Robert Christgau in the Village Voice, "Lillian Berlin is Johnny Rotten with politics. His art would be nothing without his rage; he is possessed by the need to get his point across that he grabs his brothers' music by the throat and makes it bellow his tune. But his rage wouldn't be much without his analyst, which however simplistic-and it is, though at this perilous moment no more so than apolitical cynicism or liberal equivocation-gives shape, purpose, and a referent outside his tortured psyche to feelings that emanate from who knows where." (May 10, 2005)

The following is a sampling from other professional reviews of the album:

- "One of the most ferocious straight -ahead rock album since "Nevermind" -Brian Rafferty, Spin April 2005
- "Living Things are a band of fighters determined to make us all feel like winners" 4 stars review David Fricke Rolling Stone Magazine Oct 2005
- "...what rock'n roll should be sounding like" Barry Nicolson, NME
- "...an agitprop opus that attacks the apathy, paranoia, and mood-altered gazes of George Bush-era America"- Stephen Mooallem, Interview Magazine
- "It's been a long time since rock music felt remotely dangerous. But along come Living Things-three brothers from St. Louis who mash out an archaic collision of power chords and screaming vocals that feel like a bottle breaking your head. With the simplicity of the Ramones and the fury of Nirvana, Living Things would blast of adenoidal angst if it were not for their politics" -Dimitri Ehrlich, Interview Magazine
- "...songs that pair AC/DC's aggression with Fugazi's humanistic fervor"- Jenny Williams Spin
- "They are the hardest new rock band around"- Chuck Eddy Village Voice

== Track listing ==
1. "Bombs Below" – 3:00
2. "I Owe" – 3:00
3. "Bom Bom Bom" – 3:06
4. "New Year" – 3:39
5. "God Made Hate" – 4:20
6. "End Gospel" – 3:25
7. "No New Jesus" – 3:47
8. "March in Daylight" – 3:36
9. "Keep It 'Til You Fold" – 4:10
10. "Monsters of Man" – 2:09
11. "On All Fours" – 3:50
12. "I Wish the Best for You" – 4:21

== Personnel ==
- Lillian Berlin - guitar, vocals
- Cory Becker - guitar
- Eve Berlin (aka Yves Rothman) - bass guitar
- Bosh Berlin - drums
