= Topstitch =

Sewing technique

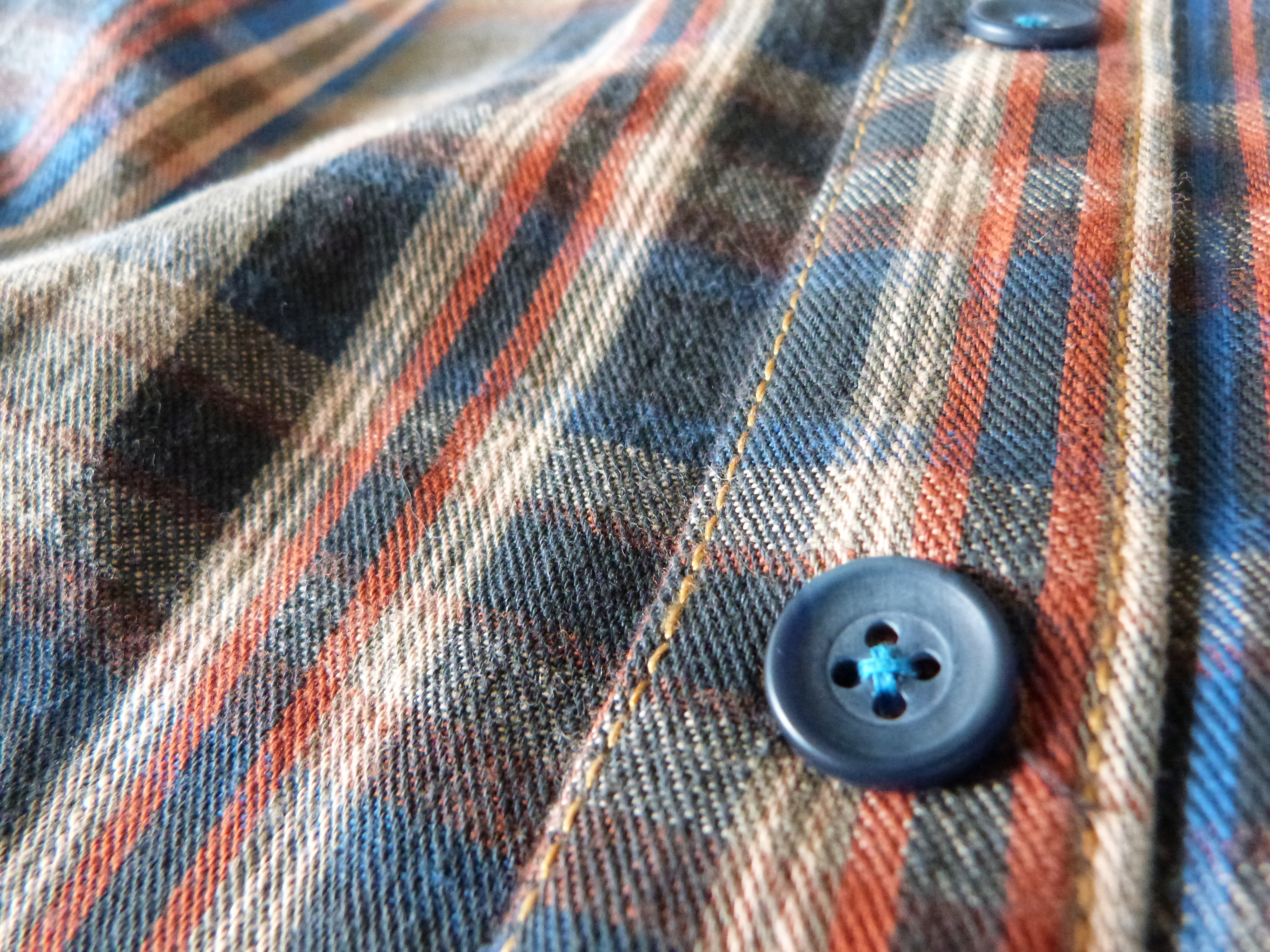
A shirt placket with buttons and topstitching.

Topstitching is a sewing technique where the line of stitching is designed to be seen from the outside of the garment, either decorative or functional.

Topstitching is used most often on garment edges such as necklines and hems, where it helps facings to stay in place and gives a crisp edge. It can also be used to attach details like pockets or tabs on zippers, especially on bags. Decorative topstitching is designed to show, and may be done in a fancy thread or with a special type of stitch. Otherwise, topstitching is generally done using a straight stitch with a thread that matches the fashion fabric.
