= Take It Like a Man (Amanda Shires album) =

Studio album by Amanda Shires
- Released: July 29, 2022
- Studio: RCA Studio B (Nashville)
- Genres: Country; folk
- Length: 37:09
- Label: ATO
- Producer: Lawrence Rothman

Amanda Shires chronology
| For Christmas (2021) | Take It Like a Man (2022) | Loving You (2023) |

Take It Like a Man is the eighth solo studio album by American singer-songwriter Amanda Shires. Produced by Lawrence Rothman and recorded at the RCA Studio B in Nashville, Tennessee, it was released on July 29, 2022, through ATO Records.

== Critical reception ==
Professional ratings
Aggregate scores
| Source | Rating |
|---|---|
| AnyDecentMusic? | 8.0/10 |
| Metacritic | 83/100 |
Review scores
| Source | Rating |
| AllMusic | 4.5/5 stars |
| Mojo | 4/5 stars |
| Paste | 7.7/10 |
| Pitchfork | 7.5/10 |
| Rolling Stone | 3.5/5 stars |
| The Guardian | 4/5 stars |
| Uncut | 8/10 |

Take It Like a Man was met with generally favorable reviews from critics. At Metacritic, which assigns a normalized rating out of 100 to reviews from mainstream publications, the album received an average score of 83, based on ten reviews.

Chris Nelson of Mojo gave the album four out of five stars, resuming: "intense. But the much tougher stuff here is emotional". Jenessa Williams of The Guardian praised the album, saying "it's rousing stuff, and with indie-pop producer Lawrence Rothman on hand, her vivid, intentionally raw fiddle-playing is balanced well with expressions of her softer side, seemingly taking inspiration from peers who are blazing trails beyond country's traditional bounds". Writing for Uncut, Lisa Marie Ferla called the album "a bold re-statement of artistic identity". Eric R. Danton of Paste wrote: "for all her strong feelings on Take It Like a Man, Shires remains a poet at heart. If her lyrics here are often forceful, they're also always evocative and sometimes even elegant, whether she's revisiting her fondness for bird imagery or seeking the thrill that accompanies a new relationship". Rolling Stone reviewer found the album "expand[s] her folk-based sound, mixing Radiohead-style atmospherics, Seventies pop melodies and even a splash of soul".

== Track listing ==
Take It Like a Man track listing
| No. | Title | Writer(s) | Length |
|---|---|---|---|
| 1. | "Hawk for the Dove" | Amanda Shires; Lawrence Rothman | 3:47 |
| 2. | "Take It Like a Man" | Shires; L. Rothman | 4:31 |
| 3. | "Empty Cups" | Shires | 3:58 |
| 4. | "Don't Be Alarmed" | Shires; Jason Isbell; Ruston Kelly; Liz Rose | 3:50 |
| 5. | "Fault Lines" | Shires | 2:56 |
| 6. | "Here He Comes" | Shires; L. Rothman; Yves Rothman | 3:29 |
| 7. | "Bad Behavior" | Shires; L. Rothman | 3:37 |
| 8. | "Stupid Love" | Shires; Peter Levin | 3:17 |
| 9. | "Lonely at Night" | Shires; Levin | 4:11 |
| 10. | "Everything Has Its Time" | Shires; Natalie Hemby | 3:33 |
| Total length: | | | 37:09 |

== Personnel ==
- Amanda Shires – vocals, fiddle
- Lawrence Rothman – keyboards, percussion, guitars, producer,mixer
- Jason Isbell – guitars
- Fred Eltringham – drums, percussion
- Julian Dorio – drums, percussion
- Jimbo Hart – bass guitar
- Peter Levin – keyboards, organ, piano
- Brittney Spencer – backing vocals
- Maren Morris – backing vocals
- Austin Hoke – cello
- Kristin Weber – violin
- Kris Wilkinson – viola
- Ben Zelico – keyboards, Mellotron
- Peter Stroud – guitars
- Audley Freed – guitars
- Marc Franklin – trumpet
- Art Edmaiston – tenor saxophone
- Kirk Smothers – baritone saxophone
- Kameron Whalum – trombone
- Gena Johnson – engineering
- Louis Remenapp – engineering
- Diana Walsh – assistant engineering
- Pete Lyman – mastering
- Mike Schmelling – photography

== Charts ==
Chart performance for Take It Like a Man
| Chart (2022) | Peak position |
|---|---|
| UK Americana (OCC) | 6 |
| UK Album Downloads (Official Charts) | 60 |
| UK Independent Albums (Official Charts) | 33 |
| US Top Album Sales (Billboard) | 31 |
| US Heatseekers Albums (Billboard) | 5 |
| US Americana/Folk Albums (Billboard) | 19 |
| US Top Current Album Sales (Billboard) | 25 |
