= Cobra Rock Boot Company =

American handmade bootmaking company based in Marfa, Texas

- Company type: Private
- Industry: Footwear
- Founded: 2011
- Founders: Logan Caldbeck, Colt Miller
- Headquarters: Marfa, Texas, United States
- Key people: Logan Caldbeck; Colt Miller
- Products: Handmade leather lace-up boots

Cobra Rock Boot Company (CRBC) is a leather-lace-up bootmaking business in Marfa, Texas. The business has been owned and operated by Logan Caldbeck and Colt Miller since 2011. They earned a runner-up finish in Garden & Gun magazine's Best of the South 2012 awards. The business was featured on episode 2 of the Basin PBS show Western Perspective and on a September 2014 episode of Texas Country Reporter.

The handmade lace-up boots are constructed at a rate of about one pair a week with materials sourced in the U.S. from full grain, oil-tanned cowhides, leather soles, and metal shanks held in place with lemon-wood pegs. Tools and equipment, including a Landis sole stitcher built in 1921 and a Singer topstitcher built in 1939 and found in Big Spring, Texas, come from former boot shops in the Texas Panhandle. Vintage lasts are used and the boots are hand welted. Their signature boot design, the South Highland, includes square toes modeled after a style popular in the 1940s.

Miller was raised in Borden County, Texas, (about 70 miles south of Lubbock) by a cowboy and a schoolteacher. He studied geography and financial planning at Texas Tech. He tours in the Thrift Store Cowboys country band. He started out in the bootmaking business producing cowboy boots.
