= Andy Wilkinson (singer-songwriter) =

American singer-songwriter

Andy Wilkinson is an American singer-songwriter who writes cowboy poetry. He was the keynote speaker at the 33rd National Cowboy Poetry Gathering.

In 2014 he was inducted into the West Texas Walk of Fame which honors individuals who have an affiliation to Lubbock and the West Texas area and have devoted much of their lives to the development of and/or gained recognition in the promotion or production of the arts, music and entertainment.
