= Texas Music =

Entertainment magazine

- Texas Music logo
- Editor: Tom Buckley
- Associate Editor: Coy Prather
- Senior Editor: Richard Skanse
- Copyeditor: Kirstin Cutts
- Frequency: Quarterly
- Publisher: Stewart Ramser
- First issue: January 2000
- Company: Ramser Media LLC
- Based in: Austin, TX
- Language: English
- Website: www.txmusic.com

Texas Music is an entertainment magazine published in Austin, Texas. Since its launch in January 2000, Texas Music has covered hundreds of the state's musicians and bands, representing all styles of music, in addition to writing about the venues and events that contribute to the state's music scene. Launched in January 2000, the magazine was formed out of an idea for an MBA school project by publisher Stewart Ramser.

Texas Music includes compilation CDs featuring Texas artists inside some issues. More than 300 artists have appeared on these CDs since 2005.

The magazine also hosts reader appreciation parties featuring performances by Texas artists.

The editor of Texas Music is Tom Buckley, a University of Texas faculty member. The art director is Martha Gazella-Taylor, who won a design award — the Charles E. Green Award for Excellence in Journalism — in 2005 for her work on the magazine. Associate editors are Coy Prather and Jeremy Ray Burchard, and Madison Searle edits the book review section. Frequent contributors include Richard Skanse, Geoff Himes, Darryl Smyers and Mike Ethan Messick. The copy editor is Kirstin Cutts.

The magazine celebrated its 10th anniversary in 2010.

The magazine celebrated its 20th anniversary in 2020. For a time, the magazine was operated by Open Sky Media in Austin, Texas, but was reacquired by Stewart Ramser, the magazine's original publisher, in 2024.

== Covers ==
Cover subjects:
No. 01 (Winter 2000) – Lyle Lovett
No. 02 (Spring 2000) – The Flatlanders
No. 03 (Summer 2000) – Fastball
No. 04 (Fall 2000) – Dixie Chicks
No. 05 (Winter 2001) – Destiny's Child
No. 06 (Spring 2001) – Charlie Robison
No. 07 (Summer 2001) – Bob Schneider
No. 08 (Fall 2001) – Robert Earl Keen
No. 09 (Winter 2002) – Spotlight Spectacular
No. 10 (Spring 2002) – Pat Green
No. 11 (Summer 2002) – Janis Joplin
No. 12 (Fall 2002) – Lee Ann Womack
No. 13 (Winter 2003) – Norah Jones
No. 14 (Spring 2003) – Willie Nelson
No. 15 (Summer 2003) – Ray Wylie Hubbard
No. 16 (Fall 2003) – ZZ Top
No. 17 (Winter 2004) – Jessica Simpson
No. 18 (Spring 2004) – Jerry Jeff and Django Walker
No. 19 (Summer 2004) – The Polyphonic Spree
No. 20 (Fall 2004) – Stevie Ray Vaughan
No. 21 (Winter 2005) – Los Lonely Boys
No. 22 (Spring 2005) – Spoon
No. 23 (Summer 2005) – Willie Nelson
No. 24 (Fall 2005) – Miranda Lambert
No. 25 (Winter 2006) – Mike Jones
No. 26 (Spring 2006) – Kinky Friedman
No. 27 (Summer 2006) – Austin City Limits Music Festival
No. 28 (Fall 2006) – Guy Clark
No. 29 (Winter 2007) – Jack Ingram
No. 30 (Spring 2007) – Patty Griffin
No. 31 (Summer 2007) – Charlie Robison and Kevin Fowler
No. 32 (Fall 2007) – Terri Hendrix
No. 33 (Winter 2008) – Ghostland Observatory
No. 34 (Spring 2008) – Willie Nelson
No. 35 (Summer 2008) – Old 97's
No. 36 (Fall 2008) – The Randy Rogers Band
No. 37 (Winter 2009) – Buddy Holly
No. 38 (Spring 2009) – Ray Benson
No. 39 (Summer 2009) – St. Vincent
No. 40 (Fall 2009) – Cross Canadian Ragweed
No. 41 (Winter 2010) – 10th Anniversary
No. 42 (Spring 2010) – Roky Erickson
No. 43 (Summer 2010) – Billy Joe Shaver
No. 44 (Fall 2010) – Kathy Valentine
No. 45 (Winter 2011) – Ryan Bingham
No. 46 (Spring 2011) – Roy Orbison
No. 47 (Summer 2011) – Steve Earle
No. 48 (Fall 2011) – Dale Watson
No. 49 (Winter 2012) – Amanda Shires
No. 50 (Spring 2012) – Top 50 Classic Texas Songs
No. 51 (Summer 2012) – Bob Schneider
No. 52 (Fall 2012) - Armadillo World Headquarters
No. 53 (Winter 2013) - Kelly and Bruce Robison
No. 54 (Spring 2013) - Willie Nelson
No. 55 (Summer 2013) - Soul Track Mind
No. 56 (Fall 2013) - Reckless Kelly
No. 57 (Winter 2014) - Kacey Musgraves
No. 58 (Spring 2014) - Bob Wills
No. 59 (Summer 2014) - Billy Joe Shaver
No. 60 (Fall 2014) - Shakey Graves
No. 61 (Winter 2015) - 15-Year Anniversary
No. 62 (Spring 2015) - Stevie Ray Vaughan
No. 63 (Summer 2015) - Shinyribs
No. 64 (Fall 2015) - Gary Clark Jr.
No. 65 (Winter 2016) - Carrie Rodriguez
No. 66 (Spring 2016) - Trish Murphy
No. 67 (Summer 2016) - Los Lonely Boys
No. 68 (Fall 2016) - Cody Johnson
No. 69 (Winter 2017) - Townes Van Zandt
No. 70 (Spring 2017) - Aaron Watson
No. 71 (Summer 2017) - Peterson Brothers
No. 72 (Fall 2017) - Willie Nelson (Hurricane Relief)
No. 73 (Winter 2018) - Whitney Rose
No. 74 (Spring 2018) – Rodney Crowell
No. 75 (Summer 2018) – Leon Bridges
No. 76 (Fall 2018) – Savannah Welch
No. 77 (Winter 2019) – Miranda Lambert
No. 78 (Spring 2019) – George Strait
No. 79 (Summer 2019) – Cody Canada
No. 80 (Fall 2019) – 20th Anniversary Issue
No. 81 (Spring 2021) – Jackie Venson/Texas Artists on the Rise
No. 82 (Fall 2021) – 25 Greatest Album Covers in Texas Music History
No. 83 (Spring 2022) – Ray Wylie Hubbard
No. 84 (Fall 2022) – Randy Rogers Band
No. 85 (Spring 2023) – Wille Nelson at 90
No. 86 (Fall 2023) – Black Pumas
