= Lawrence Rothman =

American musician

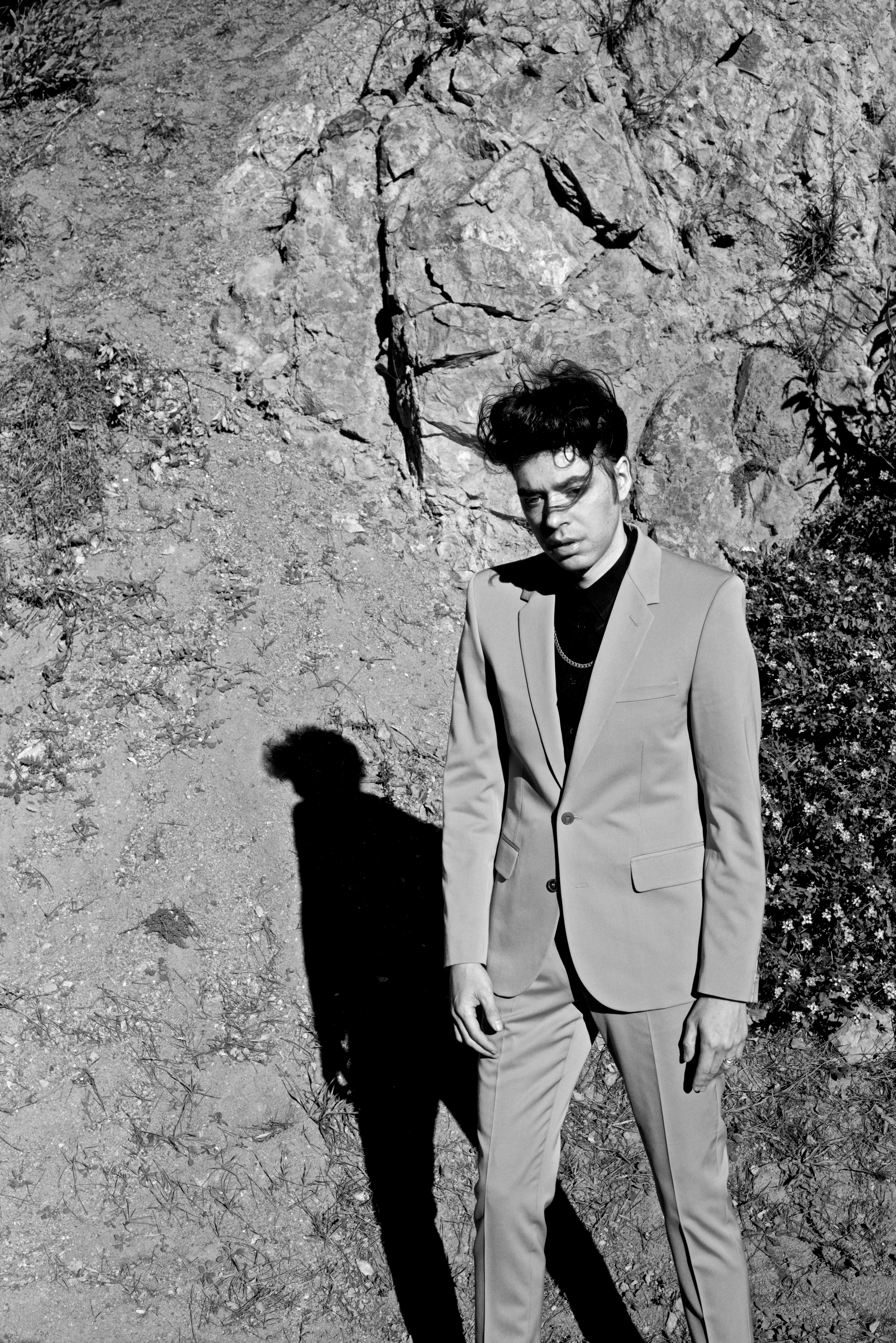
- 2014 image of Lawrence Rothman

Background information
- Born: June 19, 1982 (age 44); St. Louis, Missouri, U.S.
- Genres: Indie Folk; Americana; Alternative Country
- Occupations: Singer; Songwriter; Producer
- Instruments: Vocals, Guitar, Piano
- Years active: 2013–present
- Labels: Downtown; Interscope; KRO Records
- Formerly of: Living Things
- Spouse: Floria Sigismondi
- Website: lawrencerothman.com

Lawrence Rothman (born June 19, 1982) is an American singer-songwriter and producer based in Los Angeles. His most recent album Here Lies Love/Sawdust To Stardust was released in 2026.

== Biography ==
=== Early life ===
Rothman was born and raised in a middle class area of St. Louis, Missouri. Rothman was raised in a Catholic family. From a young age, Rothman identified as gender-fluid, wearing makeup and presenting in an androgynous style. Rothman was homeschooled until second grade and was bullied after entering the public school system.

From the age of 13, Rothman formed a number of punk, alternative rock and alt country bands and toured throughout the United States. During this period, Rothman was physically assaulted by three off-duty National Guardsmen after performing a club in Texas. Without the help of their parents, they relocated to Chicago when they were 17 years old. Rothman came into contact with musicians and artists while living with a relative, who assisted them in accepting their non-binary identity. From 2001 to 2011, Rothman fronted the punk rock band Living Things under the name Lillian Berlin.

=== 2013–2014: Early singles ===
After moving to Los Angeles, Rothman began writing music under their own name and signed to Mamaroma, the independent label founded by renowned director Floria Sigismondi, known for her music videos for David Bowie, Marilyn Manson, and Fiona Apple and for TV work including The Handmaid's Tale and American Gods. In June 2013, Rothman released their debut single, "Montauk Fling", with an accompanying video directed by Sigismondi. This marked the start of a long-term creative collaboration between the two – Sigismondi has since directed all of Rothman's music videos to date. Throughout 2013, Rothman released subsequent singles on Mamaroma: “#1 All Time Low”, “Kevin”, and “Fatal Attraction”. These saw a largely positive response from press outlets including The Huffington Post, The Guardian, and Stereogum.

=== 2015–2017: The Book of Law ===
In 2014, Rothman signed to Downtown Records and began work on their debut album, The Book of Law, with producer Justin Raisen. Rothman created a list of dream collaborators, including Duff McKagan from Guns N' Roses, Kim Gordon, Angel Olsen, and Nick Zinner from the Yeah Yeah Yeahs, whom Raisen brought into their studio. The two used Rothman's journals as the basis for the lyrics and emotional mood of the record. In an interview with the FADER, Rothman stated that the recording process was fraught and dramatic, with “drug ODs [from others in the camp], fist fights, jail, police getting called on [Raisen] by record companies, threatening to cut a guy's neck off on Thanksgiving".

=== 2021: Good Morning, America and Not a Son ===
In October 2020, Rothman announced sophomore album Good Morning, America and spoken word counterpart album Not a Son. The first single was Decent Man a duet with Grammy award-winning singer songwriter Lucinda Williams. The song a politically charged statement on 2020 America was Written and Produced By Lawrence Rothman. Good Morning America was released on July 16, 2021. Guest included Lucinda Williams, Amanda Shires, Katie Pruitt, Marissa Nadler, Caroline Rose, Mary Lattimore, Pino Palladino, and Girlpool. On Oct 10, 2021 Not A Son Rothman's spoken word poetry album was released featuring members of Thundercats band harpist Mary Lattimore and guitarist Nick Zinner of the Yeah Yeah Yeahs.

=== 2024: The Plow That Broke the Plains ===
On April 27, 2024, Rothman released their third album The Plow That Broke the Plains. Produced and Mixed by Rothman at Nashville's Sound Emporium Studios over 10 days during November 2023. First single Poster Child was written with Grammy award-winning singer songwriter Jason Isbell. The song which addresses the urgent issue of gun violence and sparked an unyielding period of creative catharsis, with Lawrence writing dozens of songs. Poster Child chronicles a 2005 assault on Rothman outside a Dallas Club for dressing in gender neutral clothing. The album recorded primarily live captures a genre bending take on the Americana Sound. Capturing personal and candid story's from Rothman's life and lessons salvaged from their decade-long struggle with body dysmorphia and a two-year battle with anorexia, while addressing themes of addiction, gender identity and societal pressures The album was praised by Rolling Stone, Vanity Fair and The Guardian for its stylistic challenging and candid approach. Country and Americana artist Amanda Shires, Jason Isbell, S.G. Goodman, Audley Freed, and Jimbo Hart, feature on the album.

=== 2026: Here Lies Love/Sawdust To Stardust ===
On September 25, 2026 Rothman released their fifth studio album,Here Lies Love / Sawdust To Stardust, through KRO Records. Produced and mixed by Rothman, the album was written and recorded between Biarritz, France, and Nashville, Tennessee, with sessions taking place at Nashville’s Sound Emporium Studios. The record completes a trilogy that began with Good Morning, America (2021) and continued with The Plow That Broke the Plains (2024). The 13-song album expands on Rothman’s Americana work while incorporating elements of folk, country, indie rock and experimental pop. Its songs address addiction, recovery, grief, identity, anxiety, lost love and reinvention. The opening track and first single, “The Meaning,” was co-written with Madi Diaz, while “A Word’s a Weapon” was written with Katie Pruitt and Jillian Jacqueline. Amanda Shires appears on “Karmakaze,” and Swedish singer Sarah Klang is featured on the duet “A Fire Test.” “Nothing Like Shakespeare,” co-written with Jason Isbell, draws on Rothman’s early move to Los Angeles and the end of a relationship with a longtime musical partner. Isbell also performs electric guitar on the recording, alongside Amanda Shires and former Drive-By Truckers bassist Jimbo Hart. Other musicians appearing across the album include Audley Freed, Fred Eltringham, Brian Allen, Dominic Davis, Peter Levin and Jen Gunderman. The album was preceded by the singles “The Meaning,” “A Fire Test,” “A Word’s a Weapon,” “Karmakaze,” “Stable” and “Demons.” The latter examines personal and collective forms of self-destruction, extending themes that appeared across Rothman’s previous two albums. Upon the album’s release, Rolling Stone published a feature titled “Lawrence Rothman Wants to Break Free From Music’s Ones and Zeroes,” examining the record in the context of Rothman’s career and their emphasis on human connection and lived experience in music. Americana Highways praised the album’s cinematic scope and Rothman’s ability to turn intimate experiences into universally relatable songs, describing Rothman as “one of the very best” at doing so. The publication also singled out Rothman’s vocals, describing their singing on “The Meaning” as a “deep, country-radio-ready voice.” Rothman has described the album’s title as a metaphor for transformation: “Sawdust is what’s left after the work. Stardust is what remains when survival becomes meaning.” They have also described the trilogy as a continuing conversation between different periods of their life, with Here Lies Love / Sawdust To Stardust serving as its concluding chapter.

=== Production career ===
Along with Rothman's music career they produced and mixed albums by Amanda Shires Take It Like A Man, Highwomen Highway Unicorn from Lady Gaga Born This Way 10th Anniversary, Margo Price, Girlpool, Jason Isbell The Sound Emporium EP, Bartees Strange, Kim Gordon, Blondshell, Tift Merritt, Maggie Rose, Bridget Calls Me Baby, Marissa Nadler For My Crimes additional production on Angel Olsen My Woman as well as acting with their first role in Drake Doremus' Endings, Beginnings, premiering at the 2019 Toronto International Film Festival. Rothman's song "Wolves Still Cry" was featured in season 2 Episode 1 of Netflix original series 13 Reasons Why that song along with "Die Daily" were featured in Endings, Beginnings and "H" in Lucifer season 1 finale episode. In November 2019 it was announced that Rothman produced and wrote the soundtrack for DreamWorks Pictures The Turning. The soundtrack out on Rothman's record label KRO featured artist such as Courtney Love, Mitski, Soccer Mommy, Kim Gordon, Warpaint, and Finn Wolfhard. Rothman wrote and produced the first single performed by Courtney Love, "Mother". Their own track "SkinDeepSkyHighHeartWide" featured Pale Waves and their track "Judas Kiss' featured MUNA. Along with writing the films 9 other soundtrack songs. Rothman authored a book Postmortem Bliss, which was turned into a short film for Tuner Classics in 2006.

=== KRO Records ===
In 2019, Rothman launched their own record label, KRO Records, with Justin Raisen, Yves Rothman. KRO’s first release included two tracks from River Phoenix's band, Aleka's Attic, along with a single from Rain Phoenix featuring Michael Stipe. This was followed by a Double A-Side Single, "Poison" by Marissa Nadler feat. John Cale of The Velvet Underground. Other releases in 2019 included Kills Birds’ self-titled debut LP, Buzzy Lee's Sasha Spielberg EP, “Close Encounters of Our Own Kind”, and a single titled “Mother” by Courtney Love. In 2020, KRO Records released Steven Spielberg produced "The Turning" soundtrack under exclusive license to Sony Music Entertainment. The film's soundtrack features tracks from Mitski, Kali Uchis, Soccer Mommy, Cherry Glazerr, Finn Wolfhard & Courtney Love. Rothman was the film's music supervisor and producer of the soundtrack. In 2026 KRO Records began a distribution partnership with Virgin Music and One Riot Music. KRO Records first release under this partnership was the Hayley Kiyoko album soundtrack, "Girls Like Girls"

=== Composing and scoring ===
In 2010, Rothman scored The Runaways, a biopic film on the Joan Jett fronted female rock band The Runaways, starring Kristen Stewart and Dakota Fanning. In 2017, Rothman scored the News Emmy nominated New York Times Great Performers 2017 series short films starring Nicole Kidman, Timothée Chalamet, Saoirse Ronan, Jake Gyllenhaal and more. In 2018, Rothman scored a short film on the life of occult filmmaker Kenneth Anger for Gucci and Systems Magazine. Additionally, Rothman has scored short films for Levis, Prada, Lexus, Bvlgari, BMW, MAC Cosmetics and Alexander McQueen.

== Discography ==
=== Albums ===
- Montauk Fling EP (2013)
- Songs for Others EP (2013)
- Alters EP (2014)
- The Book of Law (2017)
- I Know I've Been Wrong, But Can We Talk EP (2018)
- Good Morning America (2021)
- Not A Son (2021)
- The Plow That Broke the Plains (2024)
- Here Lies Love/Sawdust To Stardust (2026)

=== Singles ===
- "Montauk Fling" (2013)
- "#1 All Time Low" (2013)
- "Kevin" (2013)
- "Fatal Attraction" (2013)
- "California Paranoia" feat. Angel Olsen (2015)
- "Oz vs. Eden" (2015)
- "Users" (2015)
- "H" (2016)
- "Designer Babies" feat. Kim Gordon (2016)
- "Wolves Still Cry" (2017)
- "Ain't Afraid of Dying" feat. Marissa Nadler (2017)
- "Jordan" feat. Kristin Kontrol (2017)
- "Stand By" (2017)
- "Decade" (2018)
- "Oath" (2018)
- "SkinDeepSkyHighHeartWide" feat. Pale Waves (2020)
- "It's Hard to Be Human" feat. Marissa Nadler and Mary Lattimore (2020)
- "Decent Man" feat. Lucinda Williams (2020)
- "Thrash The West" feat. Amanda Shires (2021)
- "Breathe" feat. Caroline Rose (2021)
- "The Fix" (2021)
- "Glory" (2021)
- "Not A Son" (2021)
- "Poster Child" (2024)
- "The Plow That Broke the Plains" (2024)
- "LAX" feat. Amanda Shires (2024)
- "A Fire Test" feat. Sarah Klang (2026)
- "The Meaning" (2026)

=== Music videos ===
- Montauk Fling (2013)
- #1 All Time Low (2013)
- Fatal Attraction (2013)
- California Paranoia feat. Angel Olsen (2015)
- Oz vs. Eden (2015)
- Users (2015)
- H (2016)
- Designer Babies feat. Kim Gordon (2017)
- Wolves Still Cry (2017)
- Ain't Afraid of Dying feat. Marissa Nadler (2017)
- Jordan feat. Kristin Kontrol (2017)
- Stand By (2017)
- Decade (2018)
- Oath (2018)
- Decent Man feat. Lucinda Williams (2020)
- Thrash The West feat. Amanda Shires (2021)
- The Fix (2021)
- Glory feat.Katy Pruitt (2021)
- Sunny Place For Shady People (2021)
- Homesiick (2021)
- GirlWhoLivedToSleep (2021)
- Health Card I.D. (2021)
- Poster Child (2024)
- LAX (2024)
- The Plow That Broke the Plains (2024)
- Dreams Die Hard (2024)
- The Meaning (2026)
- A Word's A Weapon (2026)
- Karmakaze (2026)
- Demons (2026)
- Nothing Like Shakespeare (2026)

== Producer and songwriter discography ==
Year	Album/Single	Artist	Label	Credit
2026	Half Moon	Maggie Rose	Virgin Music	Producer, Mixer,Songwriter
2026	Sugar	Tift Merritt	One Riot	Producer, Mixer
2026	Girls Like Girls (Soundtrack)	Hayley Kiyoko	KRO Records/ Virgin Music	A&R
2026	Lifetime	Harmony Trividad	KRO Records/One Riot	Mixer, Mastering
2026	Red Shoes	Maggie Rose	Virgin Music	Producer, Mixer, Writer
2026	Finest Feeling	Tift Merritt	Virgin Music	Producer, Mixer
2026	Irreversible	Bridget Calls Me Baby	ATO Records	Producer, Mixer, Engineer
2026	Slumber Party	Bridget Calls Me Baby	ATO Records	Producer, Mixer, Engineer
2026	In Another Life	Krooked Kings	Virgin Music	Mixer
2025	Nobody's Girl	Amanda Shires	ATO Records	Producer, Mixer, Engineer
2025	Shy Bairns Get Nowt	Bartees Strange	4AD	Producer, Engineer
2025	V	Niia	Candid	Producer, Writer
2025	Another Picture	Blondshell	Partisan	Mixer
2025	High Horse	Black Pistol Fire	Thirty Tigers	Mixer
2025	Man of The North	Liam St. John	Big Loud Rock	Writer
2025	If You Asked For A Picture	Blondshell	Partisan	Mixer
2025	Horror	Bartees Strange	4AD	Producer, Engineer
2024	What's Fair	Blondshell	Partisan	Mixer
2024	Thank You For Sending Me An Angel	Blondshell	A24 Music	Mixer
2024	Eyes Of Glass	Stella Rose	KRO Records	Mixer, Mastering
2023	I Don't Want You Anymore	Cherry Glazerr	Secretly Canadian	Mixer
2023	The Sound Emporium EP	Jason Isbell Amanda Shires	Southeastern/Thirty Tigers	Producer, Mixer, Engineer
2023	Loving You	Bobbie Nelson Amanda Shires	ATO	Producer, Mixer, additional engineer
2023	Stories From A Rock n Roll Heart	Lucinda Williams	Thirty Tigers	String Arranger
2023	Dark Black Coal	Logan Halstead	Thirty Tigers	Producer, Mixer
2023	Live From Columbia Studio A	Amanda Shires	ATO	Producer, Writer, Mixer, Engineer
2023	Hell in The Heartland	Margo Price	Loma Vista	Producer, Writer, Engineer
2022	Take It Like A Man	Amanda Shires	ATO	Producer, Mixer, Writer, Engineer
2022	Hawk For A Dove	Amanda Shires	ATO	Producer, Mixer, Writer, Engineer
2022	Farm To Table	Bartees Strange	4AD	Producer, additional engineer
2022	Independence Day	Brittney Spencer	Amazon Originals	Producer, Mixer
2022	You Don't Own Me	Margo Price	Loma Vista	Producer, Mixer, Engineer
2022	Forgiveness	Girlpool	Anti-	Mixer
2022	Faultlines	Girlpool	Anti-	Mixer
2021	For Christmas	Amanda Shires	Thirty Tigers/Silver Knife	Producer, Mixer, Engineer, Writer
2021	Crossbones Style Georgia Blue	Jason Isbell Amanda Shires	Thirty Tigers/Southeastern	Mixer
2021	Saddle In The Rain	Amanda Shires	Oh Boy Records	Producer, Mixer
2021	You Don't Get To Go	Amanda Shires	Thirty Tigers/Silver Knife	Producer, Mixer
2021	My Friend Misery	Cherry Glazerr Metallica	Warner Bros Records	Producer, Mixer
2021	Highway Unicorn	The Highwomen Lady Gaga	Interscope Records	Producer, Mixer
2021	Honkey Tonk Heroe's	Amanda Shires Billy Joe Shaver	New West Records	Producer, Mixer
2020	The Turning (Original Motion Picture Soundtrack)	Various Artists	KRO Records /Sony Music Masterworks	Producer, Mixer, Writer, Artist
2020	Call Me	Empress Of	KRO Records /Terrible Records	Producer, mixer, writer, engineer
2020	kate's not here	Girl in Red	KRO Records/Sony Masterworks	Producer, Mixer, Writer, Engineer
2020	Mother	Courtney Love	KRO Records/Sony Masterworks	Producer, Mixer, Writer, Engineer
2020	Getting Better (otherwise)	The Aubreys featuring Finn Wolfhard	KRO Records/Sony Masterworks	Producer, Mixer, Writer, Engineer
2020	SkindeepSkyhighHeartwide (feat. Pale Waves)	Lawrence Rothman featuring Pale Waves	KRO Records/Sony Masterworks	Producer, Mixer, Engineer
2020	Mess	SASAMI	Domino	Producer, Mixer, Engineer
2020	Rise	Alison Mosshart	Domino	Producer, Bass, Mixer, Engineer
2020	The Fool (Undone)	Overcoats	Loma Vista Recordings	Mixer, Engineer
2019	Feed	Soccer Mommy	KRO Records/Loma Vista Recordings	Mixer
2019	Kills Birds	Kills Birds	KRO Records	Engineer
2019	No Home Record	Kim Gordon	Matador	Engineer
2018	Murdered Out	Kim Gordon	Matador	Engineer
2018	Premonitions	Miya Folick	Interscope Records	Engineer
2018	For My Crimes	Marissa Nadler	Sacred Bones Records	Producer, Mixer, Engineer
2018	Poison Summer	Marissa Nadler John Cale	KRO Records	Producer, Mixer, Engineer
2018	Diablo Menthe	SOKO	Because Music	Mixer
2017	The Book of Law	Lawrence Rothman	Interscope Records	Producer, Mixer, Writer, Engineer
2017	That Thing	Hazel English	Polyvinyl Records	Engineer
2016	My Woman	Angel Olsen	Jagjaguwar	Engineer, Producer
2015	For The Feel	Bleached	Dead Oceans	Producer, Mixer, Engineer
