= Rod Picott =

American singer-songwriter

- Picott playing live in Alrewas, England in 2023

Background information
- Born: Roderick Picott; November 3, 1964 (age 61)
- Origin: New Hampshire, U.S.
- Genres: Americana, folk, alternative country
- Occupations: Singer-songwriter, record producer
- Instrument: Guitar
- Years active: 2001–present
- Label: Independent
- Website: rodpicott.com

Rod Picott (born November 3, 1964) is an American singer-songwriter whose music incorporates elements of Americana, alternative country, and folk. He was born in New Hampshire, but relocated to Nashville, Tennessee, in 1994. After several years of playing local clubs and supporting such acts as Alison Krauss, he released his first album in 2001. As of 2023, he has released 15 albums.

== Career ==
Picott was born in New Hampshire, but grew up in South Berwick, Maine, where he played in various local bands. Picott met Slaid Cleaves on his first day of second grade and the two became lifelong friends and wrote several songs together. After a period living in Boulder, Colorado, where he busked and studied the art of songwriting, Picott moved to Nashville, Tennessee in 1994, where he spent a number of years playing local clubs. He began to make a name for himself as a songwriter, which grew when he co-wrote a song on Fred Eaglesmith's album 50 Odd Dollars.

In 1998 he signed a deal with the management company operated by Denise Stiff, who also managed Alison Krauss. He initially worked as the driver of Krauss's merchandise truck, but was called upon to fill in when an opening act was needed, which led to a series of support slots with Krauss.

Picott finally released his own debut album in 2001. Tiger Tom Dixon's Blues was named after his great-uncle, a boxer during the Great Depression, and featured his version of "Broke Down", a song he co-wrote with long-time friend Slaid Cleaves. A year later he released the follow-up disc Stray Dogs. Two years later he released his third disc, Girl from Arkansas. In 2005 he released a live album Travel Log that featured his friend, dobro-player Matt Mauch.

In 2014, Picott released Hang Your Hopes On A Crooked Nail, which includes the song, "I Might Be Broken Now". Picott said in an interview that the song was co-written with Amanda Shires and is about their breakup as a couple.

Picott's version of "That's What I'm Gonna Do" appears on Eight 30 Records' Floater: A Tribute to the Tributes to Gary Floater, a satirical album released early in 2018 on Austin-based Eight 30 Records.

== Discography ==
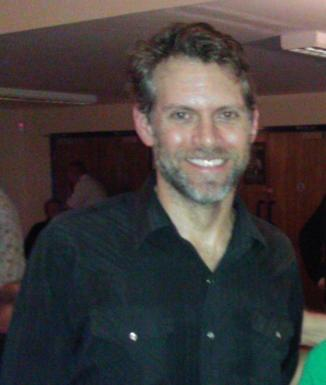
Picott pictured in 2011

=== Albums ===
- Tiger Tom Dixon's Blues (2001)
- Stray Dogs (2002)
- Girl From Arkansas (2004)
- Travel Log Volume One (2005)
- Summerbirds (2007)
- Sew Your Heart With Wires (2008, with Amanda Shires)
- Tiger Tom Dixon's Blues 10th Year Anniversary Acoustic Edition (2010)
- Welding Burns (2011)
- Hang Your Hopes On A Crooked Nail (2014)
- Fortune (2015)
- Out Past the Wires (2017)
- Tell the Truth & Shame the Devil (2019)
- Wood, Steel, Dust & Dreams (2020)
- Paper Hearts and Broken Arrows (2022)
- Starlight Tour (2023)

== Personal life ==
Picott was previously in a relationship with fellow musician Amanda Shires.
