= All on My Mind =

Single by Anderson East

from the album Encore
- Released: August 10, 2017
- Length: 3:42
- Label: Low Country Sound
- Songwriters: Anderson East; Johnny McDaid; Aaron Raitiere; Ed Sheeran
- Producers: Dave Cobb; Gregg Nadel

Anderson East singles chronology
"Devil in Me" (2016)	"All on My Mind" (2017)	"Girlfriend" (2018)

"All on My Mind" is a 2017 single by Anderson East, lead single of his 2017 album Encore. It was his first release since his 2015 album Delilah. The single reached number one on the U.S. Billboard Adult Alternative Songs and made it to number 34 on the U.S. Adult Top 40 chart.

The song was first written by Ed Sheeran and Snow Patrol's Johnny McDaid, the songwriting duo behind top-hit "Shape of You". Erik Eger, McDaid's manager, presented the demo version of the song to Gregg Nadel, Elektra Records president. Nadel, who's in charge of Sheeran's U.S. marketing, then pitched it to Anderson East, who adapted it with his longtime collaborator Aaron Raitiere. Several revisions went back and forth, and hearing the final result, Ed Sheeran "loved it," and "could not have been happier with how it turned out."

The song was nominated at the 61st Annual Grammy Awards in the Best American Roots Performance category, but lost to Brandi Carlile's "The Joke."

Rolling Stone magazine reviewed the song, saying it "sounds like pure East. Marching along with stabs of strings and swells of electric piano, 'All on My Mind' is a showcase for East’s rugged, raspy vocals as he ponders his obsession with a rule-breaking woman."

== Chart performance ==
Chart	Peak position
US Adult Alternative Airplay (Billboard)	1
US Adult Pop Airplay (Billboard)	34
US Hot Rock & Alternative Songs (Billboard)	35
US Rock & Alternative Airplay (Billboard)	31
Rock Digital Song Sales	17
