= Shine on Rainy Day =

Studio album by Brent Cobb
- Released: October 7, 2016
- Studio: Low Country Sound Studios (Nashville, TN)
- Genre: Americana
- Length: 37:31
- Label: Low Country Sound; Elektra
- Producer: Dave Cobb

Brent Cobb chronology
No Place Left to Leave (2006)	Shine on Rainy Day (2016)	Providence Canyon (2018)

Shine on Rainy Day is the second studio album by American singer-songwriter Brent Cobb. It was released on October 7, 2016, via Low Country Sound/Elektra Records. Recording sessions took place at Low Country Sound Studios in Nashville. Production was handled by his cousin Dave Cobb.

The album peaked at number 17 on the Top Country Albums and number 16 on the Americana/Folk Albums charts in the United States. At the 60th Annual Grammy Awards, it received a Grammy Award for Best Americana Album nomination, but lost to Jason Isbell's The Nashville Sound.

== Critical reception ==
Professional ratings
Aggregate scores
Source	Rating
Metacritic	81/100
Review scores
Source	Rating
AllMusic	4/5 stars
American Songwriter	3.5/5 stars
Exclaim!	9/10
PopMatters	7/10

Shine on Rainy Day was met with universal acclaim from music critics. At Metacritic, which assigns a normalized rating out of 100 to reviews from mainstream publications, the album received an average score of 81 based on six reviews.

Stuart Henderson of Exclaim! praised the album, suggesting: "Americana record of the year? It's up there". AllMusic's Timothy Monger declared: "Shine on Rainy Day is personal and soulful, with little of contemporary country's gloss and a stripped-down, earthy poeticism that some have likened to Kris Kristofferson's early albums". Hal Horowitz of American Songwriter called it "an impressive effort that proves these relatives with impeccable musical synergy have more than just bloodlines in common". John Paul of PopMatters wrote: "rather than showcasing flashy playing or overblown production, Shine on Rainy Day gets to the heart of the country music tradition, placing the emphasis squarely on the lyrics and the lives of those often overlooked to a troubling degree".

=== Accolades ===
Accolades for Shine on Rainy Day
Publication	Accolade	Rank	Ref.
The Independent	The 30 best albums of 2017	23	

== Track listing ==
No.	Title	Writer(s)	Length
1.	"Solving Problems"	Brent Cobb; Joshua Nathan Taylor	2:34
2.	"South of Atlanta"	B. Cobb; Adam Wright	5:22
3.	"The World"	B. Cobb; Erik Dylan; Phillip White	3:38
4.	"Diggin' Holes"	B. Cobb; Casey Wood	2:52
5.	"Country Bound"	Patrick Cobb; Brian Rigney	3:45
6.	"Traveling Poor Boy"	B. Cobb	3:34
7.	"Shine on Rainy Day"	B. Cobb; Andrew Combs	4:23
8.	"Let the Rain Come Down"	B. Cobb; Jason Cope; Dustin Gray	3:37
9.	"Down in the Gulley"	B. Cobb; Neil Medley	3:16
10.	"Black Crow"	B. Cobb; Dean Alexander	4:30
Total length:			37:31

== Personnel ==
- Brent Cobb – vocals, acoustic guitar
- Charlie Pate – backing vocals (tracks: 2, 4–6)
- Kristen Rogers – backing vocals (track 8)
- Dave Cobb – acoustic guitar (tracks: 1, 2, 4–6, 8, 9), electric guitar (tracks: 1–6, 8, 9), gut string acoustic guitar (tracks: 3, 7, 10), percussion (track 8), producer, mixing
- Jason Isbell – slide guitar (track 10)
- Brian Allen – bass
- Chris Powell – drums, percussion (tracks: 4, 5, 8, 9)
- Matt Ross-Spang – recording, mixing
- Pete Lyman – mastering
- Anderson East – sequencing
- Shane Stern – production coordinator
- Don Vancleave – photography

== Charts ==
Chart (2016)	Peak position
US Top Country Albums (Billboard)	17
US Folk Albums (Billboard)	16
