= Savannah Conley =

American singer-songwriter

- Born: Savannah Grace Conley; 1997 (age 28–29); Nashville, Tennessee, United States
- Genres: Folk rock; pop; country
- Occupation: Singer-songwriter
- Instruments: Lead vocals; Guitarist
- Years active: 2015–present
- Labels: Low Country Sound; Elektra; Atlantic
- Website: savannahconley.com

Savannah Grace Conley (born 1997) is an American singer-songwriter. She has released four EP albums. Twenty-Twenty, was released in April 2018 as her debut major-label EP with Low Country Sound, an imprint of Elektra, and she has since recorded two more EPs.

== Early life ==
Conley was born and raised twenty miles outside of Nashville, Tennessee into a family with strong appreciation for music. Her mother was a professional back up singer and her father was an accomplished studio musician. Conley has performed music consistently since the age of seven and was strongly influenced by the local indie rock scenes in her early years.

== Career ==
Conley recorded her first EP in 2017 called 18th & Portland. This debut EP was independently released solely by her to regional acclaim. Not long after its release, tracks from the EP, such as "Midnight Train", generated music industry interest that lead to her being noticed by producer Dave Cobb, who has been quoted as saying, "She really reminds me of a Southern Mazzy Star and I was blown away by her lyrics." He then subsequently signed her to his Low Country Sound imprint label.

Twenty Twenty was produced by Cobb and was officially released in April 2018. She has since released Surprise Surprise on Empire and Best I Can on Good Partners.

Since her most recent release, she has gone on tour as a supporting act with Anderson East and Brent Cobb. She has opened for Willie Nelson, Brandi Carlile, and Ben Folds as well.

== Discography ==
- 18th & Portland (2017)(EP)
- Twenty–Twenty (2018)(EP)
- Surprise Surprise (EP) (2020)
- Best I Can (EP) (2022)
- Playing the Part of You Is Me (2023)
