= Southern Star =

Southern Star may refer to:

== Arts and entertainment ==
- The Vanished Diamond, also translated as The Southern Star (French: L'Étoile du sud), an 1884 novel by Jules Verne and Paschal Grousset
  - The Southern Star, a 1969 comedy crime film directed by Sidney Hayers, based on the Jules Verne novel
- Southern Star (Alabama album), 1989
  - "Southern Star" (song), a song from the album
- Southern Star (Brent Cobb album), 2023

== Companies ==
=== Australia ===
- Southern Star Group (formerly Southern Star Productions), a television producer and distributor
- Endemol Southern Star, a joint venture between Southern Star Group and Endemol

=== New Zealand ===
- Southern Star (radio)

=== South Sudan ===
- Southern Star Airlines

=== United States ===
- Southern Star Amusement
- Southern Star Central Gas Pipeline
- Southern Star Concrete
- Southern Star Brewing Company

== Newspapers ==
- The Southern Star (Alabama), United States
- The Southern Star (Brisbane), Australia
- The Southern Star (County Cork), Ireland
- The Southern Star (Montevideo), Uruguay
- The Southern Star (Bega, New South Wales), Australia

== Places and structures ==
- Southern Star, renamed Melbourne Star in 2013, a giant Ferris wheel in Melbourne, Australia
- Midlothian, Texas, an American city also known as "DFW's Southern Star"
- Southern Star, a pirate ship ride at Carowinds that goes upside-down twice
- Southern Star Abbey, a Cistercian abbey in New Zealand
- Southern Star Amphitheater at AstroWorld in Houston, Texas

== Other uses ==
- Southern Star, a racehorse that finished last in the 2003 Grand National and was a non-finisher in the 2004 Grand National
- SS Belocean, a heavy lift ship launched in 1945 and renamed MV Southern Star in 1964

== See also ==
- Southern pole star
- Southstar, U.S. rapper
- Southstar, German DJ
- Star of the South, a diamond gemstone
- Southern Stars (disambiguation)
- Southern (disambiguation)
- Star (disambiguation)
