= RCA Records =

American record label

- RCA logo introduced in 1968
- Parent company: Sony Music Entertainment (2008–present); Previously Consolidated Talking Machine Company (1900–1901); Victor Talking Machine Company (1901–1929); Radio Corporation of America (1929–1986) General Electric Company (1986–1987) Bertelsmann Music Group (1987–2004); Sony BMG Music Entertainment (2004–2008)
- Founded: January 9, 1900; 126 years ago (as Consolidated Talking Machine Company)
- Founder: Eldridge R. Johnson; Emile Berliner
- Genre: Various
- Country of origin: United States
- Location: New York City, U.S.
- Official website: rcarecords.com

RCA Records is an American record label owned by Sony Music Entertainment, a subsidiary of Sony Music Group, a subsidiary of the Japanese conglomerate Sony Group Corporation. It is one of Sony Music's flagship labels, alongside RCA's former longtime rival Columbia Records. The label has released multiple genres of music, including pop, classical, rock, hip hop, afrobeat, electronic, R&B, blues, jazz, and country. The label's name is derived from its defunct parent company, the Radio Corporation of America (RCA).

After the RCA Corporation was purchased by General Electric in 1986, GE sold its remaining interest in RCA Records to Bertelsmann in 1987, making it a part of Bertelsmann Music Group (BMG); following the merger of BMG and Sony in 2004, RCA Records became a label of Sony BMG Music Entertainment. In 2008, after the dissolution of Sony BMG and the restructuring of Sony Music, RCA Records became fully owned by Sony.

RCA Records is the corporate successor of the Victor Talking Machine Company.

== Beginnings and history ==
Revised version of classic RCA corporate logo, also used on many foreign RCA record releases in lieu of the "His Master's Voice" trademark until 1968. It was revived by BMG for RCA Records worldwide from 1987 to 2015, and still appears on RCA Nashville division releases and some reissues

In 1929, the Radio Corporation of America (RCA) purchased the Victor Talking Machine Company, then the world's largest manufacturer of phonographs (including the famous "Victrola") and phonograph records. The company then became the RCA Victor Division of RCA. In absorbing Victor, RCA acquired the New World rights to the famous Nipper/"His Master's Voice" trademark. In 1931, RCA Victor's British affiliate, the Gramophone Company, merged with the Columbia Graphophone Company to form EMI. This gave RCA head David Sarnoff a seat on the EMI board.

In September 1931, RCA Victor introduced the first 33 1/3 rpm records sold to the public, calling them "Program Transcription" records. These used a shallower and more closely spaced implementation of the large "standard groove" found on contemporary 78 rpm records, rather than the "microgroove" used for post-World War II 33 1/3 rpm "LP" (long play) records. The format was a commercial failure, partly because the new Victrolas with two-speed turntables designed to play these records were exorbitantly priced, the least expensive model retailing for $395.00 in the depths of the Great Depression. By 1933, the format was abandoned and two-speed turntables were no longer offered, but some Program Transcriptions lingered in the Victor record catalog until the end of the 1930s.

During the early days of the Depression, RCA Victor made a number of attempts to create a successful low-priced label to compete with "dime store labels" such as Perfect, Oriole, Banner, and Melotone. The first was the short-lived Timely Tunes label in 1931, sold exclusively by Montgomery Ward. Bluebird Records was created in 1932 as a sub-label of Victor. It was originally an 8-inch record with a dark blue label, alongside the 8-inch Electradisk label (sold by F.W. Woolworth). Neither label was a success. In 1933, RCA Victor reintroduced Bluebird and Electradisk as a standard 10-inch label (Bluebird's label was redesigned, and it became known as the 'buff' label). Another discount label, Sunrise, was produced (although it is not known for whom it was produced, as Sunrise records are exceptionally rare today). The same musical couplings were issued on all three labels and the Bluebird label is still in existence today, nine decades after Electradisk and Sunrise were discontinued.

During this time, RCA Victor also produced electrical transcriptions of music under the RCA Thesaurus label at its RCA Recorded Program Services studio in New York City. These recordings were not offered for sale to the general public and were intended solely for use in broadcasts carried over leading radio networks. By 1936, RCA's extensive musical library of recordings was eventually consolidated with NBC's own transcription division. During the 1950s, it included popular music by noted musicians, such as Sammy Kaye, Freddie Martin, Lawrence Welk and John Serry Sr.

=== RCA Victor Custom Record Division ===
Besides manufacturing its own records, RCA's Custom Record Division was the leading record manufacturer for independent labels. RCA Victor's immense Midwestern manufacturing complex in Indianapolis, included a record pressing plant located at 501 North LaSalle Street. The Custom Division notably pressed many record compilations for The Reader's Digest Association.

=== EMI ===
RCA sold its interest in EMI in 1938, but EMI (acquired by Universal Music Group) continued to distribute RCA Victor recordings in the UK and its territories on the His Master's Voice label until 1957. RCA also manufactured and distributed HMV recordings on the RCA Victor and custom HMV labels in North America.

=== World War II era ===
Due to hostilities between Japan and the United States during World War II, ties between RCA Victor and its Japanese subsidiary Victor Company of Japan (Nippon Victor) were severed. JVC's (Japan Victor Company) record company is known today as Victor Entertainment and still retains the Nipper/His Master's Voice trademark for use in Japan.

From 1942 to 1944, RCA Victor was seriously impacted by the American Federation of Musicians recording ban. Virtually all union musicians in the US and Canada were forbidden from making recordings during the period. One of the few exceptions was the eventual release of recorded radio broadcast performances from the NBC Symphony Orchestra conducted by Arturo Toscanini. However, RCA Victor lost the Philadelphia Orchestra during this period; the orchestra's contract with RCA Victor expired during the strike and when Columbia Records settled with the union before RCA Victor, Eugene Ormandy and the Philadelphians signed a new contract with Columbia and began recording in 1944. Ormandy and the Philadelphia Orchestra would not return to RCA until 1968.

=== The post-war 1940s ===
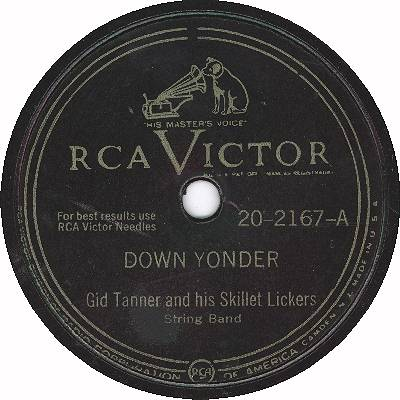
Standard RCA Victor 78 RPM label design from just after the end of World War II until 1954

In the spring of 1946, "RCA Victor" replaced "Victor" on its record labels. In 1949, RCA Victor introduced the 7-inch 45 rpm micro-grooved vinylite record, marketed simply as the "45". The new format, which had been under development for over a decade, was originally intended to replace 78 rpm discs. By the time RCA Victor unveiled it, the 45 was now competing with the 10-inch and 12-inch 33 1/3 rpm microgroove vinyl "LP" (Long Play) discs introduced by arch-rival Columbia Records in the early summer of 1948. In heavy promotion, RCA Victor sold compact, inexpensive add-on and stand-alone units that played the 45 rpm format exclusively. At first, RCA Victor's 45s were issued on colored vinyl according to the musical genre: contemporary pop music on black vinyl (47-xxxx series), prestigious Broadway musicals and operettas on "midnight blue" vinyl (52-xxxx series), classical music on red vinyl (49-xxxx series), country and polka on green (48-xxxx series), children's fare on yellow (also in the 47-xxxx series), rhythm and blues on orange or cerise (50-xxxx series), and international on light blue (51-xxxx series). This array of colors complicated the production process, and the practice was soon discontinued, all records becoming black. Yellow and red Red Seal records held on until about 1952. The first 45 rpm record manufactured was "PeeWee the Piccolo" RCA Victor 47-0147 pressed December 7, 1948 at the Sherman Drive plant in Indianapolis. The use of vinyl, which was much more expensive than the gritty shellac compound normally used for 78s, was actually cheaper because of the smaller diameter and greatly reduced bulk of the new records, which required very little raw material. The smaller, lightweight discs were also more economical to store and ship.

RCA Victor marketed the 45 as a direct replacement for 10-inch and 12-inch 78 rpm records, which typically played for about three and four minutes per side respectively. The company also released some "extended play" (EP) 45s with playing times up to 7 minutes per side, primarily for vocal collections and light classical selections, as typified by an Arthur Fiedler and the Boston Pops Orchestra disc featuring Tchaikovsky's Marche Slave and Ketèlbey's In a Persian Market. RCA Victor issued boxed sets of four to six 45s, each set providing about the same amount of music as one LP (an extreme example of these 45 rpm boxed sets was the complete 1951 recording of the opera Carmen, featuring Risë Stevens and Jan Peerce, conducted by Fritz Reiner, which consisted of sixteen 45 rpm discs). In the case of operas, symphonies and other complete recordings of classical music, there was an interruption every four minutes as one record side ended and another side began. These disruptive "side breaks", a nuisance long familiar to listeners of album sets of classical and operatic 78 rpm records, were minimized by an extremely fast automatic record-changing mechanism that was a core feature of RCA Victor's 45 players. Thanks in large degree to RCA Victor's massive five million dollar advertising campaign, the 45 became the preferred speed for pop music singles, overtaking U.S. sales of the same material on 78s by 1954, but Columbia's LP prevailed as the favored format for classical music and convenient one-disc "album" collections of eight or more pop songs. RCA Victor finally bowed to the inevitable and announced its intention to issue LPs in January, 1950.

==== RCA Victor Award of Merit ====
The RCA Victor Award of Merit was the company's top citation to its employees. It was awarded from 1945 until at least 1957, with the recipients joining the RCA Victor Award of Merit Society, which held dinners for them. A maximum of 15 employees were recipients of the award each year, with this number awarded between 1946 and 1952. A Mr Watters, who had been assistant director of personnel at Camden, won an award in 1946. In 1952, Paul Barkmeier and David Finn won awards. By 1953, around 100 employees had been recipients of the "coveted award", with only the third woman, Shirley Neuman awarded in that year, along with field engineer M. John Heffernan.

=== 1950s ===
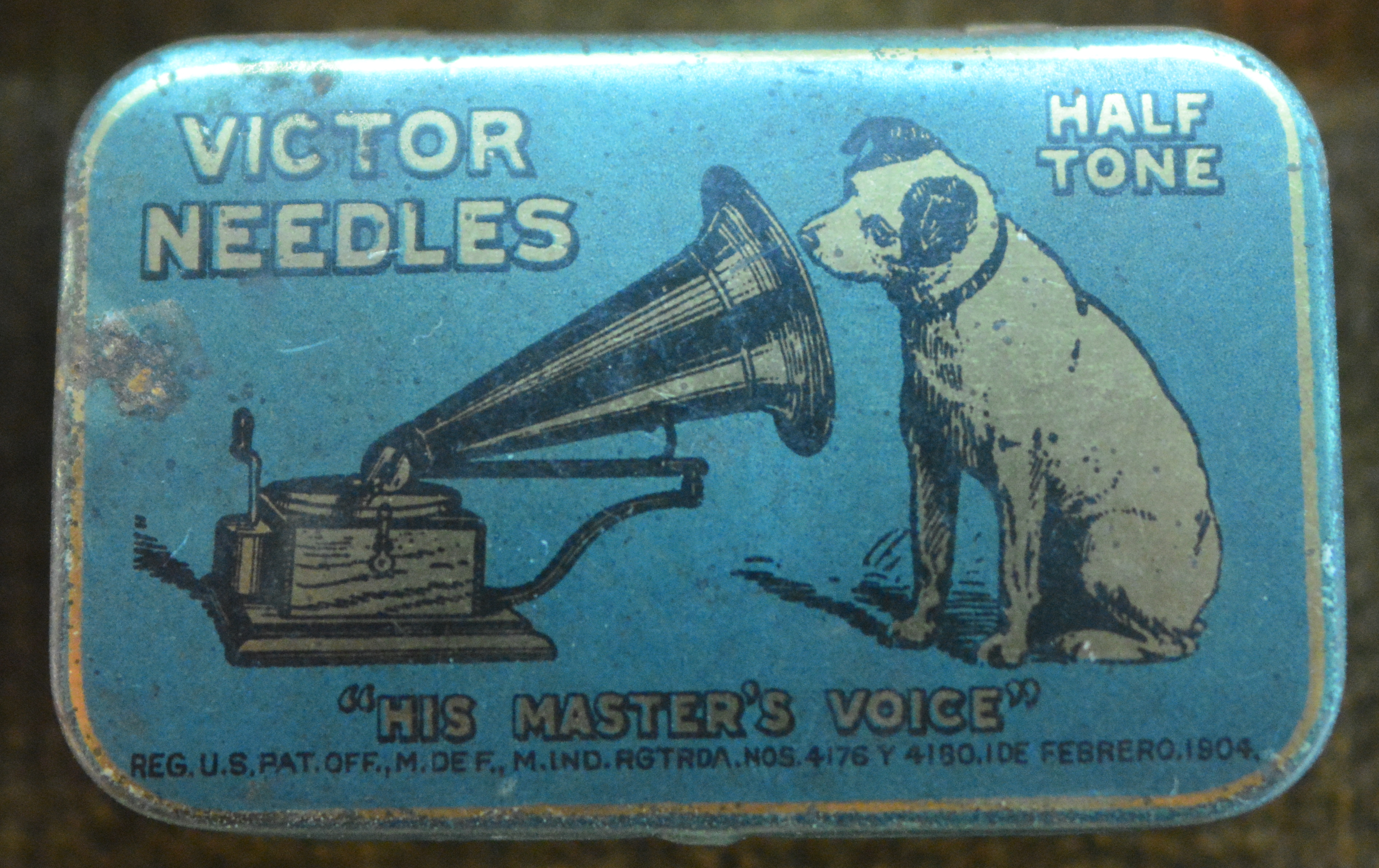
Metal tin of Victor brand phonograph needles, featuring "Nipper" c. 1915

Among the first RCA Victor LPs released in 1950 was Gaîté Parisienne by Jacques Offenbach, performed by Arthur Fiedler and the Boston Pops Orchestra, which had been recorded in Boston's Symphony Hall on June 20, 1947; the record was given the catalogue number LM-1001. Non-classical LP record albums were issued with the prefix "LPM". When RCA Victor began issuing classical LPs in stereophonic sound in 1958, the prefix "LSC" was used. Non-classical stereo LPs were issued with the prefix "LSP". RCA utilized these catalog prefixes until 1973, when they were changed to "ARL1" and "APL1" for stereo classical and stereo non-classical single LPs, respectively.

During the 1950s, RCA Victor had three subsidiary or specialty labels: Groove, Vik and "X".

The edition of Billboard magazine dated April 11, 1953, announced a new RCA Victor subsidiary label, its first to use independent distribution and was nameless when it was first revealed. For the lack of any better designation, Billboard chose to refer to the new, unnamed label in the story as Label "X"; the new label began to hire staffers and decide on a direction, and the name stuck until 1955. RCA Victor officially announced the formation of label "X" on April 20, 1953. Groove was an R&B specialty label founded in 1954 and folded into Vik in 1957; the Vik label was discontinued the following year.

From the label's beginnings in 1902, and intensifying through the 1940s and 1950s, RCA Victor was in direct competition with Columbia Records. A number of recordings were made with the NBC Symphony Orchestra, conducted by Arturo Toscanini; sometimes RCA Victor utilized recordings of broadcast concerts (Toscanini had been recording for the label since the days of acoustic recordings, and RCA Victor had been recording the NBC Symphony since its creation in 1937). After Toscanini retired in the spring of 1954, the NBC Symphony was reorganized later that year as the Symphony of the Air. The orchestra, while no longer connected to NBC, continued to record for RCA Victor, as well as other labels, usually conducted by Leopold Stokowski. RCA Victor also released a number of recordings with the RCA Victor Symphony Orchestra, which was usually drawn from either Philadelphia or New York musicians, as well as members of the Symphony of the Air, and the orchestra of the Metropolitan Opera. By the late 1950s, RCA Victor had fewer high prestige orchestras under contract than Columbia had: RCA Victor recorded the Chicago Symphony Orchestra, the Boston Symphony Orchestra, and the Boston Pops, whereas Columbia had the Cleveland Orchestra, the Philadelphia Orchestra, and the New York Philharmonic Orchestra under contracts.

On October 6, 1953, RCA Victor held experimental stereophonic sessions in New York City's Manhattan Center with Leopold Stokowski conducting a group of New York City musicians in performances of George Enescu's Roumanian Rhapsody No. 1 and the waltz from Tchaikovsky's opera Eugene Onegin. There were additional stereo tests in December, again in the Manhattan Center, this time with Pierre Monteux conducting members of the Boston Symphony Orchestra. In February 1954, RCA Victor made its first commercial stereophonic recordings, taping the Boston Symphony Orchestra, conducted by Charles Münch, in a performance of The Damnation of Faust by Hector Berlioz. This began a practice of simultaneously recording orchestras with both stereophonic and monaural equipment. Other early stereo recordings were made of Toscanini's final NBC concerts (never officially issued) and Guido Cantelli respectively, with the NBC Symphony Orchestra; the Boston Pops Orchestra under Arthur Fiedler; and the Chicago Symphony Orchestra under Fritz Reiner. Initially, RCA used RT-21 quarter-inch tape recorders (which ran at 30 inches per second), wired to mono mixers, with Neumann U-47 cardioid and M-49/50 omnidirectional microphones. Then they switched to an Ampex 300–3 one-half inch machine, running at 15 inches per second (which was later increased to 30 inches per second). These recordings were initially issued in 1955 on special stereophonic reel-to-reel tapes and then, beginning in 1958, on vinyl LPs with the "Living Stereo" logo. RCA has continued to reissue many of these "Living Stereo" recordings on CD. Another 1953 project for RCA was converting the acoustically superior building Webster Hall into its main East Coast recording studio. RCA Victor operated this studio venue from 1953 to 1968.

In September 1954, RCA Victor introduced "Gruve-Gard" where the center and edge of a record are thicker than the playing area, reducing scuff marks during handling and when stacked on a turntable with an automatic record changer. Most competitors quickly adopted the raised label and edges.

In 1955, RCA Victor purchased the recording contract of Elvis Presley from Sun Records for the then-exorbitant sum of $40,000. His first single for RCA Victor was "Heartbreak Hotel", recorded in January 1956. Ten million Presley singles were sold by the label during 1956; Presley went on to become RCA Victor's biggest selling artist.

Following its purchase of Capitol Records in January 1955, EMI/HMV ended its 55-year reciprocal distribution agreement with RCA Victor. Effective in 1957, Capitol became the main distributor for EMI recordings in the Western Hemisphere. Decca Records became the manufacturer and distributor for RCA Victor in the United Kingdom, using the RCA lightning bolt logo, instead of the Nipper/His Master's Voice trademark for which EMI held the rights to in the U.K. and Europe. RCA set up its own British manufacturing and distribution in 1969.

RCA Victor issued several spoken word albums in the 1950s and 60s, notably the soundtracks of the films Richard III, A Man for All Seasons and The Taming of the Shrew, as well as complete versions of the National Theatre of Great Britain stage productions of Othello (starring Laurence Olivier) and Much Ado About Nothing (starring Maggie Smith, who also played Desdemona in the Olivier Othello). None of these albums have appeared on compact disc, but the films of Richard III, A Man For All Seasons, The Taming of the Shrew and the filmed version of Olivier's Othello have all been issued on DVD.

=== 1960s ===
In 1960, RCA Victor announced the Compact 33 double extended play and singles; these were 7 inch records, which played at 33 1/3 rpm. In January 1961, the Compact 33 discs were released simultaneously with their 45 rpm counterparts. The long-term goal was to phase out the 45 rpm disc, but sales of the new records were poor and by early 1962 the campaign had failed.

In 1963, RCA Victor introduced Dynagroove which added computer technology to the disc cutting process, ostensibly to improve sound reproduction. Whether or not the complex process was actually an improvement is still debated among audiophiles. RCA quietly phased out the Dynagroove process by 1970.

In September 1965, RCA and Lear Jet Corp. teamed up to release the first stereo 8-track tape music Cartridges (Stereo 8) which were first used in the 1966 line of Ford automobiles and were popular throughout the late 1960s and 1970s. (The initial release comprised 175 titles from RCA Victor and RCA Camden's catalog of artists.)

In late 1968, the Radio Corporation of America, wishing to modernize its image, introduced what was then a futuristic-looking new logo (the letters 'RCA' in block, modernized form), replacing the original lightning bolt logo, and the virtual retirement of both the Victor and Nipper/His Master's Voice trademarks. The Radio Corporation of America officially changed its name to the RCA Corporation; the RCA Victor Division was now known as RCA Records. The 'Victor' trademark was restricted to the labels and album covers of RCA's standard popular record releases. RCA Victor record labels were changed to bright orange or yellow (becoming tan briefly late in 1974 thru mid-1976), replacing the traditional black label color in use for regular releases since 1901. The Nipper/His Master's Voice trademark was seen only on the album covers of RCA Red Seal Records.

RCA Records introduced a thin, pliable, lightweight vinyl LP record known as Dynaflex in late 1969. This very thin, flexible record claimed to overcome warping and other problems encountered with conventional thicker LP records and like Dynagroove, it soon developed a similarly controversial reputation, derided by some record collectors as "Dynawarp". RCA gradually phased out Dynaflex records and by the end of the 1970s had returned to manufacturing thicker vinyl records.

=== 1970s ===
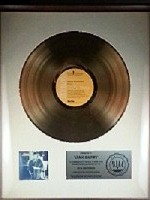
Platinum record of album Nilsson Schmilsson, featuring the 1968–75 Orange RCA Victor label

In April 1970, RCA Records announced the first quadraphonic 4-channel 8-track tape cartridges ("Quad-8", later called just Q8). The first quadraphonic vinyl recordings in the United States were issued in February 1973, in the CD-4 format developed by RCA's former subsidiary, the Victor Company of Japan (JVC), and made commercially practical by Quadracast Systems Inc. (QSI). RCA's trade name for quadraphonic LP records was "Quadradisc". The CD-4 format required a special cartridge that had a ±1 db frequency response out to 50 kHz, a CD-4 demodulator which decoded the difference between the front and rear channels from a 30 kHz subcarrier, four separate amplifier channels, and four separate speakers for the left and right front and left and right rear. Both the CD-4 Quadradisc and Quad-8 tape cartridge systems were true discrete 4–4–4 quadraphonic systems. Columbia Records introduced a quadraphonic matrix system, called SQ, which required a decoder, 4-channel amplifier and the four speakers. The SQ system was referred to as a 4–2–4 matrix system.

The Warner Music Group labels also adopted Quadradisc, but the format never became popular, and both RCA and CBS/Columbia ceased issuing quadraphonic recordings in 1976; some of the RCA sessions were later remastered for Dolby encoding (same as Peter Scheiber's original matrix system) and released on compact disc This included Charles Gerhardt's acclaimed series of RCA Red Seal albums devoted to classic film scores by Erich Wolfgang Korngold, Alfred Newman, Dimitri Tiomkin, Max Steiner, Franz Waxman, and others, performed by the National Philharmonic Orchestra and recorded in London's Kingsway Hall.

In order to publish music in Japan, RCA collaborated with the Victor Company of Japan's publishing wing Victor Musical Industries Inc. in 1975 to found Japanese record label RVC.

In October 1976, the RCA Corporation announced the revival of the Nipper/His Master's Voice trademark. RCA Records had already began to reinstate Nipper to most (Victor, Victrola, Red Seal and Special Products) record labels in mid-1976 (in addition to returning to the traditional black label color for popular releases) in countries where RCA held the rights to the Nipper/His Master's Voice trademark. Nipper was once again widely used in RCA newspaper and magazine advertisements and sales literature, as well as store displays and promotional items such as T-shirts caps, posters, coin banks, keychains, watches, coffee mugs and stuffed toys. The trademark was also restored to RCA stationery, shipping cartons and company vehicles.

=== 1980s ===
In 1983, Arista Records owner Bertelsmann sold 50% of Arista to RCA. In 1985, Bertelsmann and RCA Records formed a joint venture called RCA/Ariola International. In December 1985, the RCA Corporation was purchased by General Electric (GE), with the acquisition completed in June, 1986. In 1987, GE sold its 50% interest in RCA Records to its partner Bertelsmann and the company was renamed BMG Music for Bertelsmann Music Group. BMG soon began phasing out the current RCA logo, replacing it with the earlier RCA "lightning bolt" logo that was retired in 1968 to differentiate RCA Records from the other RCA divisions, which GE either liquidated, sold, or closed. BMG also revived the "RCA Victor" name for Red Seal, Broadway and soundtrack releases and other musical genres outside of rock, pop and country music. In 1986, Bob Buziak, formerly an artist manager, was appointed president of the label.

During the mid-1980s, RCA Records operated at a deficit, due in part to "overpriced deals" with pop stars including Kenny Rogers and Diana Ross. In 1986, the label bought back $25 million in unsold albums and lost $35 million during the fiscal year 1987. As a partial corrective, a decentralized style of management which allowed RCA Records to function as a free-standing entrepreneurial business was implemented for 1988. Buziak drastically cut the RCA roster from around 40 artists to 11, and began to rebuild it with a focus on developing new artists, including artists acquired through marketing and distribution agreements with Beggars Banquet Records, a British punk rock label, and Jive Records, whose roster included Schooly D, Kool Moe Dee, and DJ Jazzy Jeff & the Fresh Prince.

By the end of the fiscal year 1988, RCA Records had gross revenue of $236 million in the United States, the most profitable year in the label's history. The album The Way It Is by Bruce Hornsby and the Range, sold more than three million copies, and the soundtrack album from the film Dirty Dancing, which cost RCA $200,000 to produce, sold 15.6 million copies in less than two years. Its follow-up, More Dirty Dancing, composed of song tracks which had been left off of the first album, was produced for $80,000 and went on to sell more than 5.6 million. RCA's most successful artists during the 1980s included the Eurythmics, Love and Rockets, Joshua Perahia, Rick Astley, Hall & Oates, Dolly Parton, Juice Newton, and Bucks Fizz.

=== 1990s ===
In August 1990, Buziak was replaced by Joe Galante, who had been the president of RCA Records Nashville division. The roster was cut once again and the A&R department was restructured. Along with the launch of BNA Records and the expansion of the urban music division, these initiatives would prove to be positive, but RCA was unsuccessful under Galante, ranking 10th in market share in 1995. Galante returned to head the RCA Nashville division and in March, 1995 was replaced by Bob Jamieson, the president of RCA's Canadian division. Jamieson overhauled RCA, streamlining middle management and retooling the label's marketing department. The A&R department was again restructured and the roster of artists further reduced.

By the close of the decade, RCA Records had undergone what Billboard described as a "remarkable turnaround" with the success of artists including Britney Spears, the Dave Matthews Band, Natalie Imbruglia, the Verve Pipe, Robyn, SWV, Christina Aguilera, NSYNC, and Foo Fighters. A distribution deal with Loud Records yielded hit records from urban artists including Big Punisher, Wu-Tang Clan and Mobb Deep.

=== 2000s ===
In 2002, BMG fully acquired J Records, which it had founded in 2000 as a joint venture with Clive Davis. Davis was then named chairman of RCA Records and J Records under the auspices of a new entity, the RCA Music Group, which included RCA Records, J, and Arista Records. In 2004, Sony and BMG merged their music divisions to create Sony BMG, and in 2007, the RCA Music Group was rebranded as the BMG Label Group. In 2006, Sony BMG merged its former Broadway music and classical labels, including Red Seal and Gold Seal, to Sony Masterworks. Legacy Recordings, Sony Music Entertainment's catalog division, reissued classic albums from RCA.

In April 2008, former Zomba Label Group president and CEO Barry Weiss was appointed chairman of the BMG Label Group, and Davis was named chief creative officer of Sony BMG worldwide. In October, Sony acquired BMG's 50% ownership and the BMG Label Group was merged with the Jive Label Group to establish the RCA/Jive Label Group. It included RCA, Jive, J, Arista, Polo Grounds, LaFace Records, Volcano Entertainment, Hitz Committee, Battery Records, and the Verity Gospel Music Group.

The decade marked a period during which RCA Records had notable success in the pop genre, with Aguilera, Kesha, Pink, Kelly Clarkson and Pitbull scoring multiple number one hits on the Billboard Hot 100 charts.

=== 2010s ===
In May 2011, former Universal Music Group CEO Doug Morris was appointed chairman of Sony Music Entertainment. Focused on A&R, Morris named Peter Edge, president of A&R at RCA and J Records, chairman and CEO of RCA Music Group. Tom Corson was named president and COO. On the seventh of October of that year, the Jive, Arista and J imprints were altogether permanently merged into RCA. As a result, the RCA Music Group was then disbanded and RCA was reinstated as a standalone label under the Sony Music umbrella. Following the shutdown of the three labels, a majority of various artists from the rosters of Jive, Arista and/or J were shifted to release future material under RCA.

During the first half of the decade, RCA released platinum and multi-platinum records by artists including A$AP Rocky, ATEEZ, Cage the Elephant, Chris Brown, Kelly Clarkson, Miley Cyrus, D'Angelo, Dave Matthews Band, Foo Fighters, G-Eazy, Jennifer Hudson, R. Kelly, Kesha, Khalid, Alicia Keys, Kings of Leon, Miguel, Pentatonix, P!nk, Pitbull, Shakira, Sia, Britney Spears, Bryson Tiller, Justin Timberlake, T-Pain, and Tinashe. Since 2012, the label has released music by artists including: Kevin Abstract, A$AP Ferg, Becky G, Bleachers, Brockhampton, Bryson Tiller, Cam, G-Eazy, Childish Gambino, Martin Garrix, Bob Feldman, H.E.R., Normani, Kaytranada, Khalid, Kygo, Tate McRae, and Mark Ronson.

In 2015, RCA Records reinstated the 1968 space-age 'RCA' logo after utilizing the lightning bolt logo since 1987. The lightning bolt logo is still used by RCA's Nashville division.

John Fleckenstein and Joe Riccitelli were appointed as co-presidents of RCA Records in January 2018. Later that year, RCA named Keith Naftaly president of A&R, and Tunji Balogun executive VP of A&R.

=== 2020s ===
In addition to releasing successful albums by Bryson Tiller, Alicia Keys, Fousheé' and Pentatonix in 2020, RCA had number one records with Doja Cat's "Say So" feat. Nicki Minaj; Miley Cyrus' "Plastic Hearts" and Chris Brown & Young Thug's "Go Crazy". Brockhampton's single "Sugar" was certified platinum, and singles by Flo Milli and Latto (formerly known as "Mulatto") were certified gold. Both Doja Cat and Kaytranada received multiple Grammy nominations, including Best New Artist, H.E.R. received her 13th Grammy nomination, and the Strokes album The New Abnormal won for Best Rock Album. Koffee signed with RCA just after she became the first woman and the youngest person to win the Reggae Album of the Year Grammy. In June 2020, the label partnered with the Human Rights Campaign to present the 2020 Pride Benefit Concert, a livestream supporting LGBTQ equality in June. RCA artists including Isaac Dunbar, Cam, and Citizen Queen performed. SZA released the single "Good Days" on December 25.

In January 2021, Mark Pitts was appointed president of RCA Records and John Fleckenstein was named chief operating officer. Jazmine Sullivan's Heaux Tales hit number one on the Billboard R&B albums chart. Tate McRae's "You Broke Me First" (stylized as "you broke me first") was quadruple platinum in Ireland, double platinum in Canada, Mexico and New Zealand, and platinum in the US, UK, Australia, Finland, France, Malaysia, the Netherlands, Norway, and Sweden. She was number one on the Billboard emerging artist chart. In April 2024, Variety announced that the label had signed Thai rapper Lisa, a member of the South Korean girl group Blackpink, for her venture into American solo endeavors.

On April 14, 2026, Pitts parted ways with RCA to launch a new management company.

== Broadway and Hollywood ==
RCA Victor has produced several notable Broadway cast albums, among them the original Broadway recordings of Brigadoon, Paint Your Wagon, the Mary Martin Peter Pan, Damn Yankees, Hello, Dolly!, Oliver!, and Fiddler on the Roof. RCA has also recorded and released recordings of revival stagings of musicals. These include the musical productions staged at Lincoln Center, such as the 1966 revivals of Show Boat and Annie Get Your Gun, the 1987 revival of Anything Goes and the 1998 Broadway revivals of Cabaret and The Sound of Music. Call Me Madam was recorded by RCA Victor with all of its original cast except for its star Ethel Merman, who, due to contractual obligations, could not be released from her American Decca Records contract. She was replaced on the RCA Victor album by Dinah Shore. RCA Victor was also responsible for the film soundtrack albums of Damn Yankees, South Pacific, Bye Bye Birdie, Half a Sixpence, and The Sound of Music. The album made from the 1965 hit Julie Andrews film was (and is) one of the best selling soundtracks of all time. The film soundtrack of Oliver!, made by Colgems Records, was distributed by RCA, which had released the Broadway cast album. RCA Victor also released the original American cast album of Hair.

Similarly, RCA Victor also made several studio cast recording albums, including a Lerner and Loewe series with Jan Peerce, Jane Powell, and Robert Merrill, as well as a 1963 album of excerpts from George Gershwin's Porgy and Bess, with its 1952 revival leads, Leontyne Price and William Warfield, but a different supporting cast. They also issued two studio cast versions of Show Boat, one with Robert Merrill, Patrice Munsel, and Rise Stevens in 1956, and the other with Howard Keel, Anne Jeffreys, and Gogi Grant in 1958. Contrary to the way the show is written, both of these Show Boat albums featured all-white casts, reflecting the era of racial segregation.

In 2006, Sony BMG merged its Broadway music labels, including RCA Victor, to the new Masterworks Broadway Records. All of these recordings are now on Masterworks Broadway Records, which has remastered and reissued many of these albums.

== Recording studios ==
Victor's early recording studios were established in Philadelphia in 1901 and then at its headquarters in Camden, New Jersey and also in New York. In 1917, Victor acquired the deconsecrated Trinity Church located at 114 North 5th Street in Camden and used it as a recording studio until 1935. Beginning in 1928, Victor built a new recording studio in New York City and in the 1950s and '60s RCA Victor built and operated recording studio facilities in Nashville, Hollywood, and Chicago. In 1977, the RCA studios in Nashville and Hollywood were closed; the remaining New York City recording studios were closed in 1993.

=== East 24th Street, New York ===
In 1928, the Victor Talking Machine Company opened a recording studio at 155 East 24th Street in Manhattan, which became RCA Victor Studios following the Radio Corporation of America's purchase of the Victor Company in 1929. Operational from 1928 to 1969, the studio was the site of numerous notable recordings by such artists as Glenn Miller and His Orchestra, Eddie Fisher, Elvis Presley, The Isley Brothers, Charles Mingus, Perry Como, Harry Belafonte, Lena Horne, Della Reese, and Neil Sedaka. In 1969, RCA sold the building to the City College of New York, which occupied it until 1998, after which the building was razed to facilitate construction of the Baruch College Newman Vertical Campus.

=== 1133 Avenue of the Americas, New York ===
In 1969, RCA consolidated its New York City corporate offices and opened new recording studios within a new building located at 1133 Avenue of the Americas, closing the East 24th Street studios it had operated for over 40 years. RCA's Sixth Avenue Studios consisted of five recording studios, including Studio A, a 60 x 100 foot room with 30-foot ceiling, nine tape mastering rooms and five lacquer mastering channels. These facilities were often used for classical projects and numerous original Broadway cast recordings of shows. RCA closed its Sixth Avenue Studios in 1993, with the space later becoming offices.

=== RCA Victor Studio B, Nashville ===
In 1956, Steve Sholes and Chet Atkins established RCA Victor's first Nashville recording studio at 1611 Hawkins Street (later renamed Roy Acuff Place) in what would become Nashville's Music Row district. In the two decades the studio was in operation, RCA Victor Studio B produced 60 percent of the Billboard magazine's Country chart hits, and was an essential factor to the development of the musical production style and sound engineering technique known as the Nashville Sound. RCA operated the studio until January 1977, when the Nashville offices were closed and their properties located on Music Row were sold. Since 1992, the historic RCA Studio B in Nashville has been under the ownership of the Country Music Hall of Fame, which offers scheduled tours of the facilities.

=== RCA Victor Studio A, Nashville ===
In 1964, Chet Atkins, Owen Bradley and Harold Bradley established the newer, larger RCA Victor Studio A at 806 17th Avenue South, adjacent to RCA's existing studio (which was subsequently designated RCA Victor Studio B). The studio was operated by RCA until January 1977, when their Nashville offices were closed and properties located on Music Row were sold. In 2015, Studio A was added to the National Register of Historic Places. Since 2016, the studio has housed Low Country Sound, a record label imprint run by Dave Cobb The studio has since been refurbished and restored, along with the building's original RCA Victor signage.

=== RCA Victor Music Center of the World, Hollywood ===
In 1959, RCA Victor established the RCA Victor Music Center of the World at the former NBC Radio complex located at 1510 North Vine Street in Hollywood, California. The studio hosted recording sessions by Henry Mancini, Sam Cooke, and others. In 1964, RCA Victor opened a new facility and offices at 6363 Sunset Boulevard, which it operated until closing its Los Angeles studios in 1977. Artists including Jefferson Airplane, The Monkees and Elvis Presley recorded at this studio. The building is currently home to the Los Angeles Film School.

=== RCA Mid-America Recording Center, Chicago ===
In 1969, RCA established the RCA Mid-America Recording Center on 1 North Wacker Drive in Chicago. The studio utilized the acoustical expertise of the David Sarnoff Research Center, Known for recording such acts as the Guess Who, Alice Cooper, and Curtis Mayfield, the facility was closed in 1972.

== Criticisms and controversies ==
=== Kenny Rogers ===
After Kenny Rogers left RCA Records in 1987, he accused the label of trying to ruin his career. Rogers had signed to RCA in 1982 for an advance sum of $20 million (the largest deal ever in country music up to that time) when Bob Summer was head of the label.

=== Kelly Clarkson ===
In the summer of 2007, Kelly Clarkson and Clive Davis, then head of Sony BMG, feuded publicly regarding the direction of her album My December, the follow-up to Clarkson's multi-platinum album, Breakaway. Clarkson wrote the songs on My December, "showcasing her own songwriting on darker, edgier rock-oriented fare", and Davis insisted Clarkson work with hired hitmakers, as she had previously, on "polished, radio-friendly songs". Clarkson refused to change the album, and it was released in June 2007. It has since been certified platinum.

=== Avril Lavigne ===
In November 2010, Avril Lavigne stated that the long delay of her fourth album, Goodbye Lullaby, was due to "a bunch of bureaucratic BS" related to RCA. The album was ultimately released in March 2011. In October 2011, Lavigne confirmed that she had left RCA and signed with sister label Epic Records.

=== Brooke Candy ===
In early 2017, Brooke Candy left RCA before the release of her initially planned debut studio album Daddy Issues, citing creative stifling for her departure and accusing the label of taking control of her sound and image, as well as dictating what she could publicly say and do. She later claimed that she "fought, bare-fucking knuckle, to get the fuck out of [RCA]" and that Sony had taken ownership of the scrapped album's recordings despite not allowing her to release them, leaving her back at square one musically.

=== R. Kelly ===
RCA reportedly ignored allegations of sexual misconduct by R. Kelly, which included running a violent cult, wherein he held teenage individuals hostage in exchange for sexual favors. Kelly continued to release music for RCA through 2018, when pressure from the Mute R. Kelly campaign mounted against him. In January 2019, following the broadcast of Lifetime's documentary Surviving R. Kelly, his contract was terminated by RCA.

=== Other notable events ===
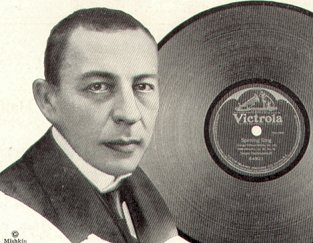
Sergei Rachmaninoff's studio master recordings were believed destroyed in the demolition of RCA Victor's Camden warehouse.

In the early 1920s, Victor was slow about getting deeply involved in recording and marketing black jazz and vocal blues. By the mid-to-late 1920s, Victor had signed Jelly Roll Morton, Bennie Moten, Duke Ellington and other black bands, and was becoming very competitive with Columbia and Brunswick, even starting their own V-38000 "Hot Dance" series that was marketed to all Victor dealers. They also had a V-38500 "race" (race records) series, a 23000 'hot dance' continuation of the V-38000 series, as well as a 23200 'Race' series with blues, gospel and some hard jazz. However, throughout the 1930s, RCA Victor's involvement in jazz and blues slowed down and by the time of the musicians' strike and the end of the war, Victor was neglecting the R&B (race) scene, which is one of the reasons so many independent companies sprang up so successfully.

In the early 1960s, RCA Victor demolished its Camden warehouse. This warehouse reportedly held four floors' worth of Victor's catalog dating back to 1902 and vault masters (most of them were pre-tape wax and metal discs), test pressings, lacquer discs, matrix ledgers, and rehearsal recordings. The company retained some of the more important masters (such as those by Enrico Caruso, Arturo Toscanini, George Gershwin, Glenn Miller, Fats Waller and Jimmie Rodgers; why the masters of Sergei Rachmaninoff apparently were not saved is a mystery), but it is uncertain just how many others were saved or lost. A few days before the demolition took place, some collectors from the US and Europe were allowed to go through the warehouse and salvage whatever they could carry with them for their personal collections. Soon afterward, record collectors and RCA Victor officials watched from a nearby bridge as the warehouse was dynamited, with many studio masters still intact in the building. The remnants were bulldozed into the Delaware River and a pier was built on top of them. In 1973, to celebrate the centenary of Rachmaninoff's birth, RCA planned to reissue his complete recordings on LP; according to R. Peter Munves, director of RCA Red Seal at that time, RCA was forced to obtain copies of certain records from collectors because the RCA archives were incomplete, as documented in an article in Time magazine.

== Other RCA labels ==
- RCA Records (UK): A division of Sony Music UK, since 2006, which acts as an import label of American and multinational Sony Music artists, and also signs UK and Irish artists, including Paloma Faith, Everything Everything, Laura Mvula, Little Mix, Olly Murs, and Kodaline.
- RCA Red Seal Records: The RCA Red Seal classical music label is now part of Sony Masterworks.
- RCA Camden: A budget reissue label of RCA Records launched in 1953; the Camden label currently reissues CD collections of certain vintage recordings in the UK, Australia and other countries.
- RCA Records (France): A division of Sony Music France. Founded as RCA Cinematre in 1978, renamed to RCA Records (France) in 2006. Absorbed sister division Jive Epic in 2019.
- RCA Records (Italy): A division of Sony Music Italy. Founded as RCA Italiana in 1949. It was closed in 1987 and reactivated in 2006.
- RCA Victor: The former name of RCA Records until late 1968. It is active as a label that distributes electronic, rock and soundtrack albums, such as The Sound of Music soundtrack, Jose Feliciano's Feliz Navidad, the European release of The Fashion by the Fashion, American releases of albums by Imogen Heap. In 1987, BMG revived the RCA Victor name for Red Seal recordings and other classical, pop and soundtrack releases. Some re-releases of albums by Elvis Presley and others issued prior to 1968 list the label as "RCA Victor".
- RCA Records (Australia): A division of Sony Music Australia. Founded in 1956, initially under the distribution of Amalgamated Wireless Australasia, it began recording Australian artists in 1963. Renamed to RCA Limited Australia and New Zealand in 1976 for Australian and New Zealand artists. Renamed to RCA Records (Australia) in 2006.
- Bluebird Records: Launched by RCA Victor in 1932, Bluebird was originally a lower-priced label releasing mainly jazz, blues and country music. The current Bluebird label offers mostly jazz releases, as well as some reissues of historic jazz, swing and pop titles originally released on the RCA Victor and Bluebird labels.
- RCA Inspiration: The label puts out mainly Urban contemporary gospel music. The label replaced Verity Gospel Music Group in 2013.
- RCA Records (China): A division of Sony Music China, Established in May 2022, it is headquartered in Shanghai, China.

== Previous labels ==
- RCA Victor Label Group: The RCA Victor Label Group consisted of the RCA Victor, Windham Hill Records and Bluebird Records labels.
- RCA-distributed labels: A&M Records, Colpix Records, Colgems Records, Chart Records, Calendar/Kirshner, Chelsea Records, Grunt Records, Windstar Records, Midland International, Loud Records, LLOUD Co., 20th Century Fox Records, Planet Records, Total Experience Records, Wooden Nickel Records, Millennium Records, Duble Kick Entertainment and Tortoise International Records (Detroit)
- Black Seal Music: A short-lived imprint of RCA Records that released indie rock music. Artists who recorded on Black Seal include Albert Hammond, Jr., Audrye Sessions, and Cory Chisel and the Wandering Sons.

== Executives ==
- Peter Edge: Chairman and CEO
- John Fleckenstein: COO
- Mark Pitts: President
- Keith Naftaly: President of A&R

== Gallery ==
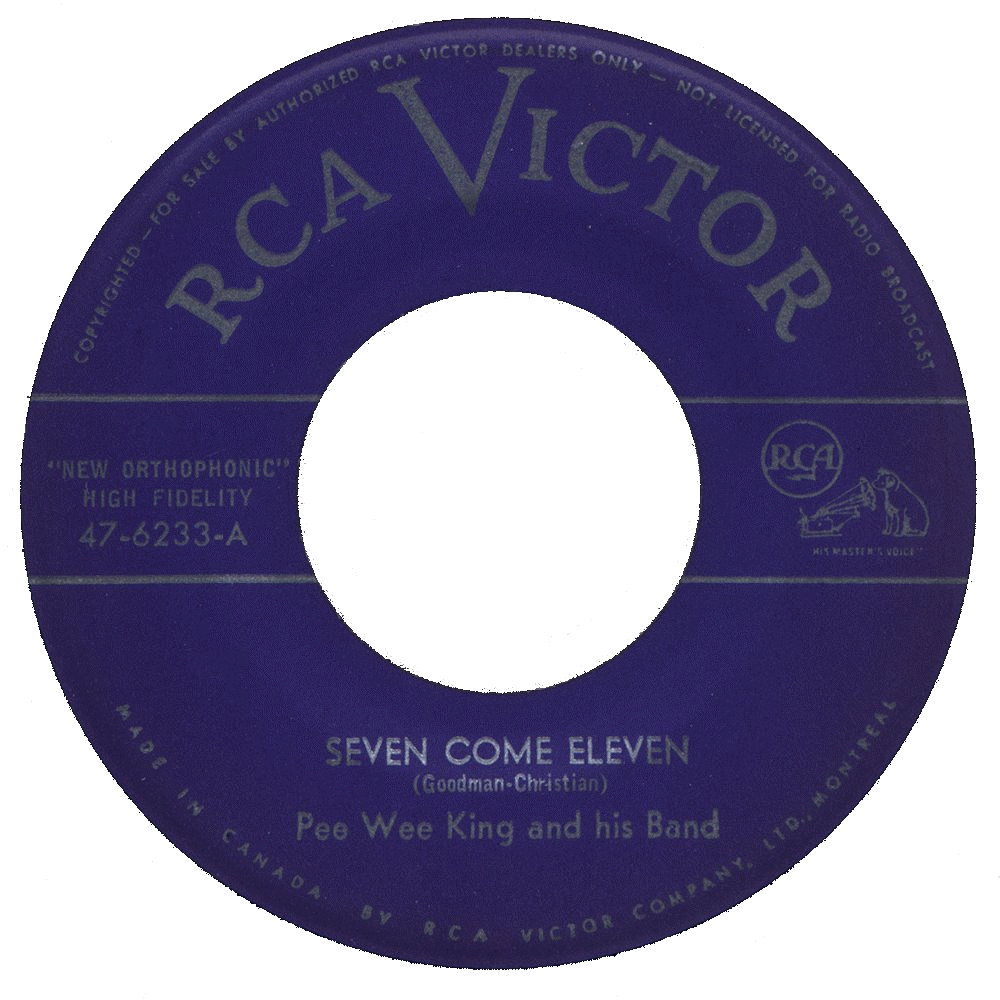
A 1950s Canadian 45 RPM RCA Victor label.

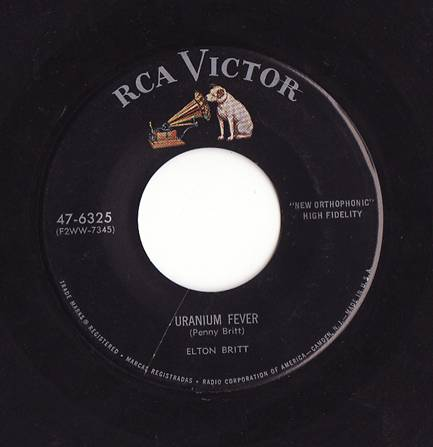
Label of an RCA Victor 45 rpm record from 1954 to 1964.

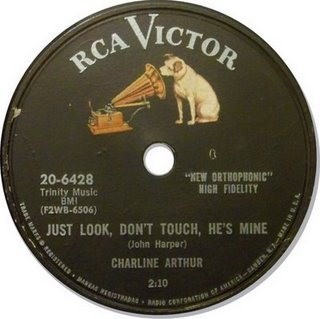
Label of an RCA Victor 78 rpm record from the mid to late 1950s. This basic design was also used for most LPs and 45s from 1954 to 1964.

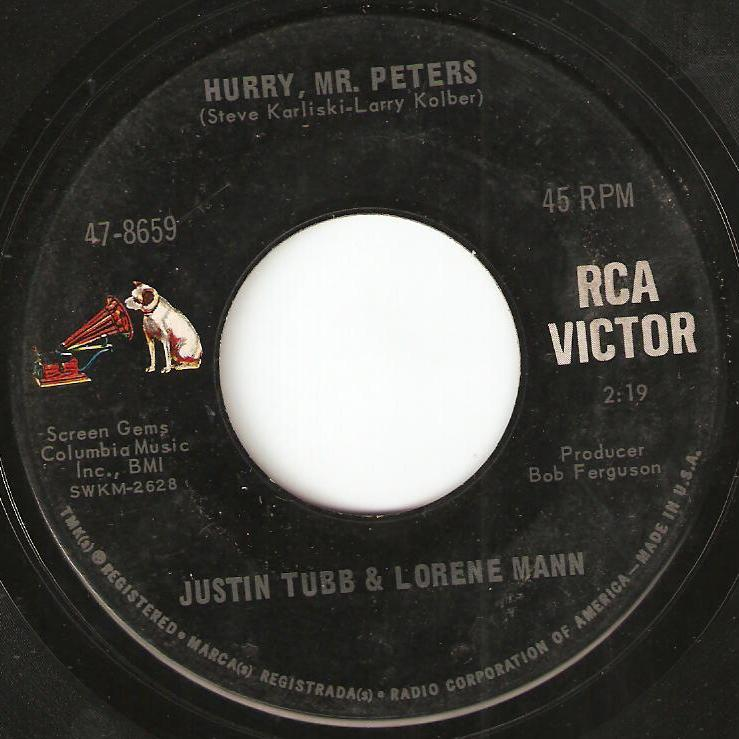
RCA Victor used this label for its American 45 rpm records during the "Dynagroove" era from 1965 to late 1968.

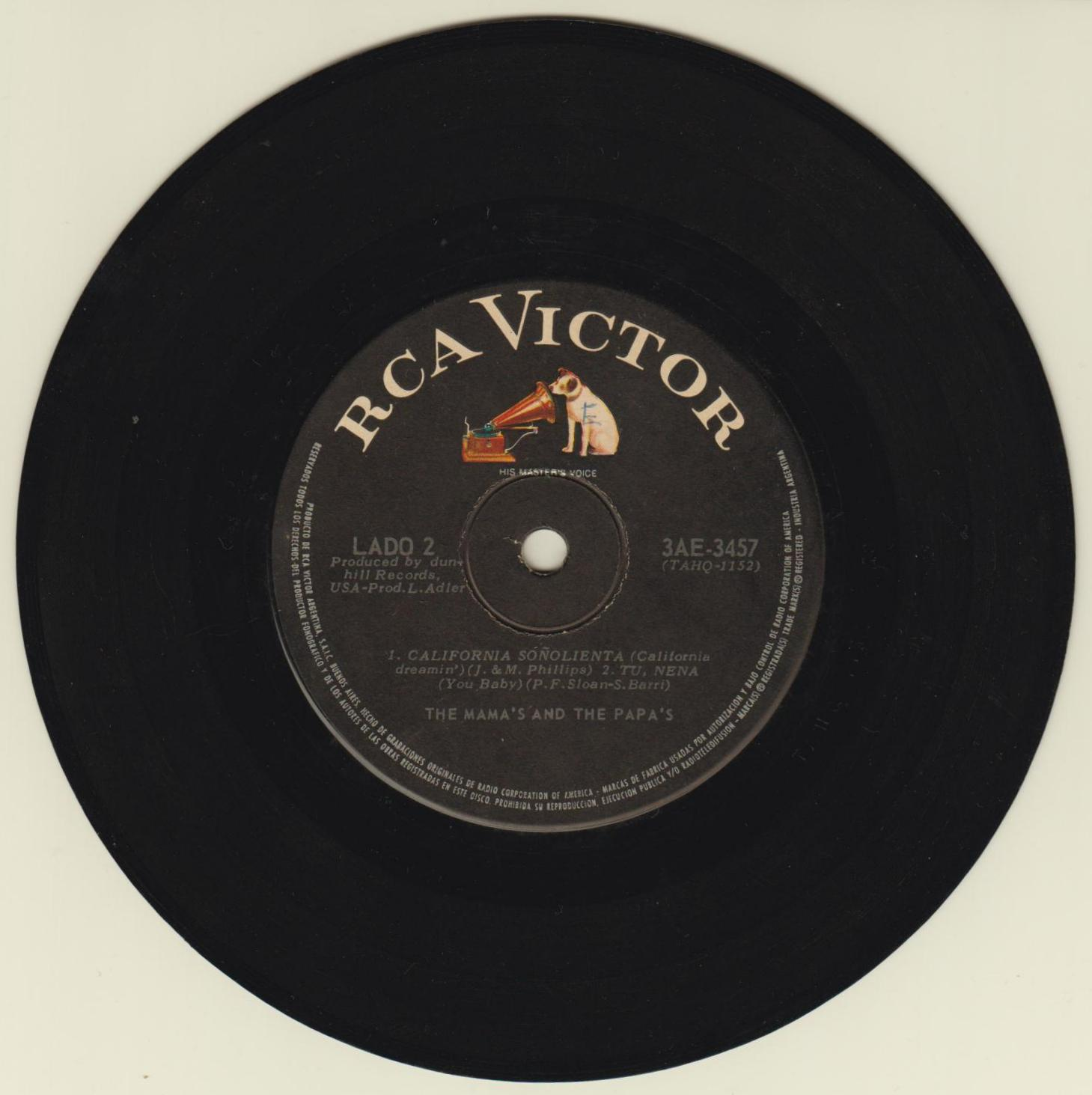
RCA Victor LP label during the "Dynagroove" era was also used for 45 rpm records in South America during the mid- to late 1960s.

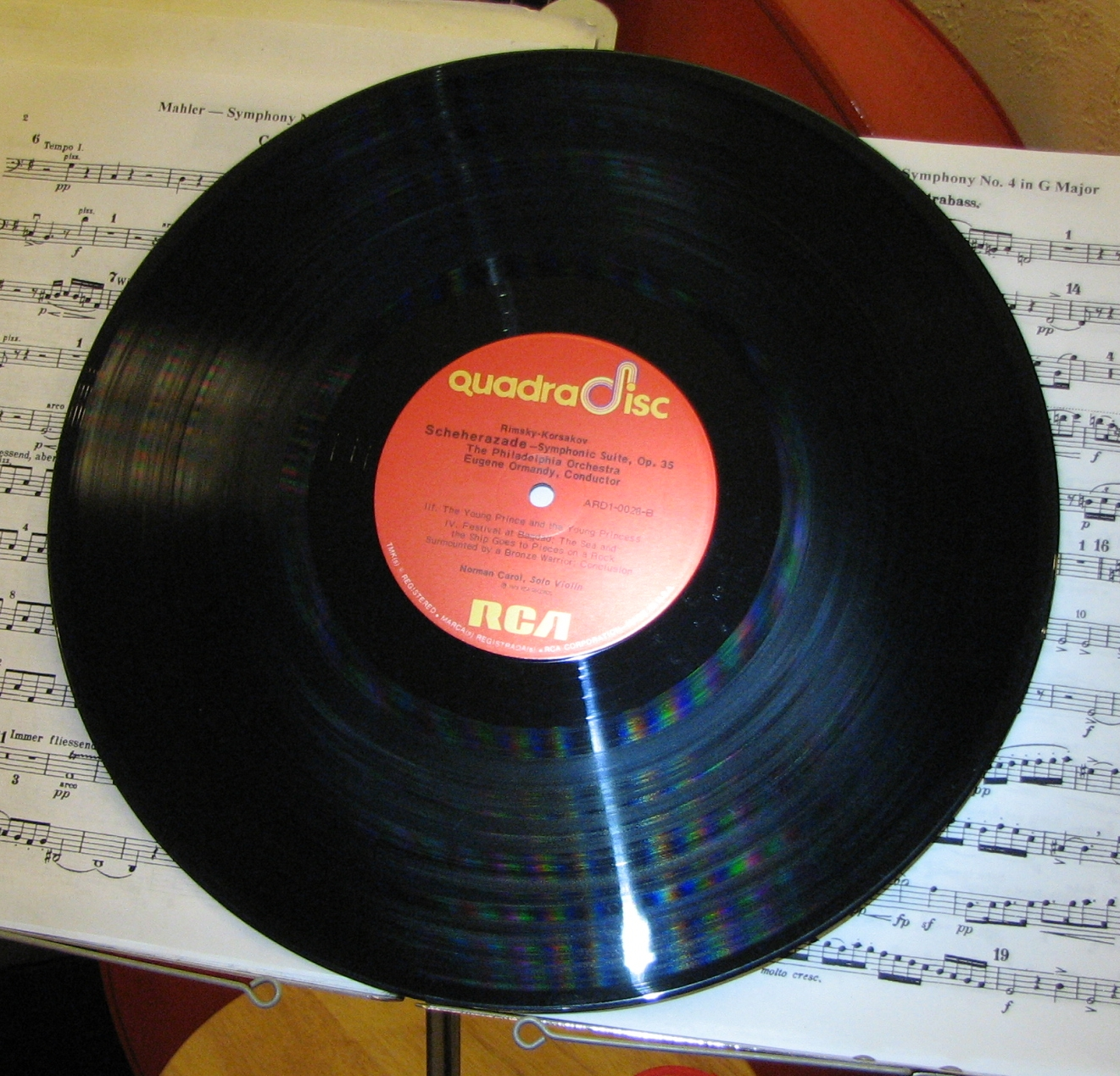
An example of an RCA Compatible Discrete 4 or Quadradisc album; RCA used this label on some Quadradisc LPs from 1972 to 1976.

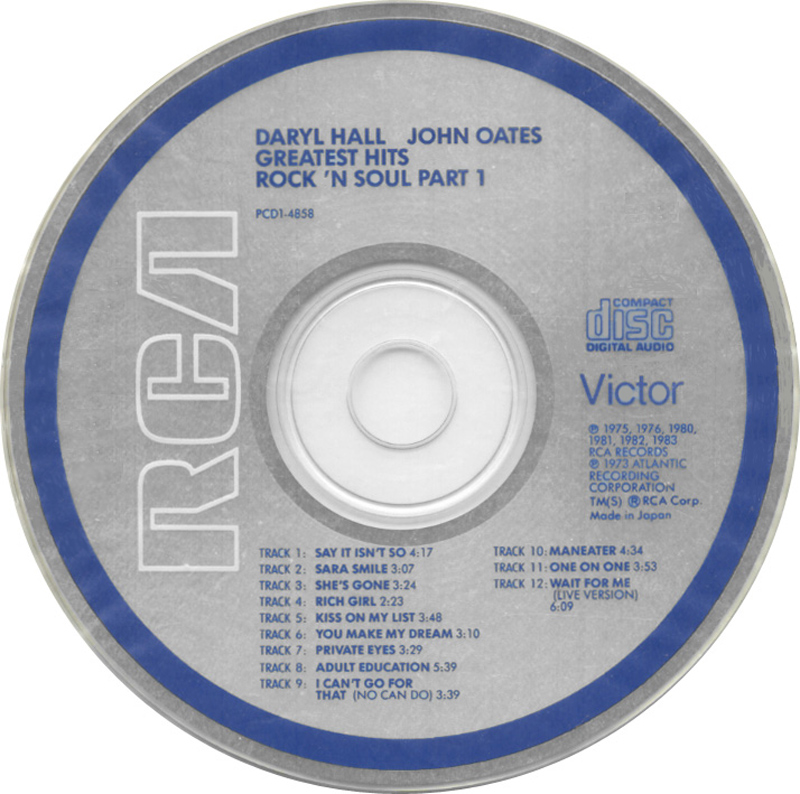
Standard "Blue Ring" RCA Victor label used on early US CDs from 1983 through 1987. Some later releases and reissues on this label design change the ring and print color from blue to black.

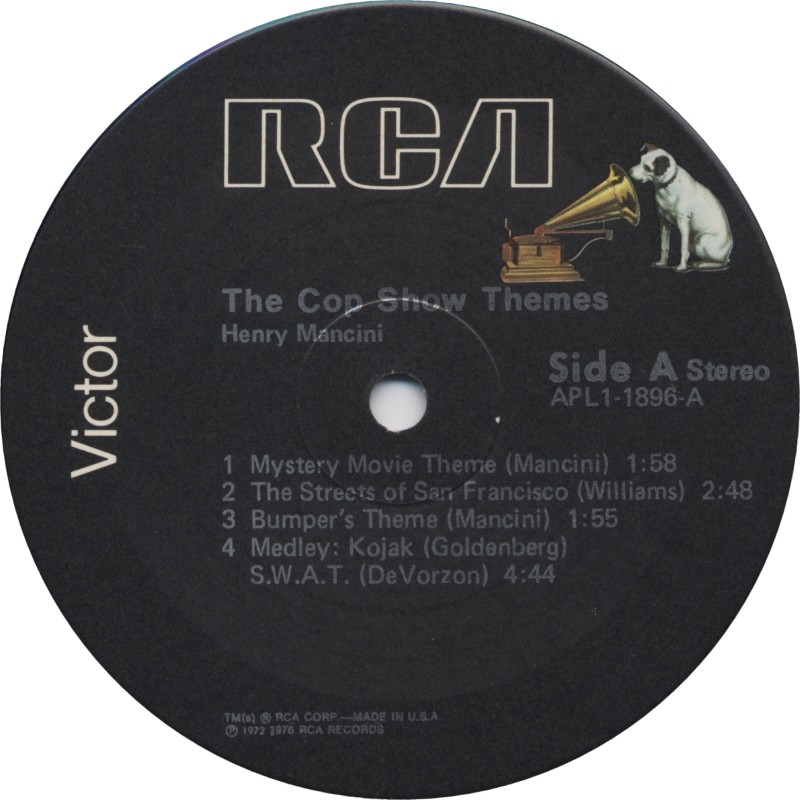
RCA's standard black Victor label used on most vinyl LPs issued in the Western Hemisphere from mid 1976 to 1989; 45 rpm records used a similar label. This label was also used in the Philippines and South Korea.

== See also ==
- RCA Victrola
- RCA Studio B
