= Rock Rock Kiss Kiss Combo =

Studio album by The Fashion
- Released: September 15, 2003
- Genre: Indie rock, alternative rock, post-punk revival
- Label: Sony BMG Denmark
- Producer: Michael Ilbert & The Fashion

The Fashion chronology
| Rock Rock Kiss Kiss Combo (2003) | The Fashion (2007) |

Professional ratings
Review scores
| Source | Rating |
|---|---|
| Melodic.net | 3/5 stars |
| Gaffa.dk | 4/6 stars |

Rock Rock Kiss Kiss Combo is the debut album of Danish indie rock band The Fashion. It was released September 15, 2003 by Sony BMG Denmark. The album featured the singles “Let's Go Dancing”, and “Roller Disco Inferno” and the album was given extensive airplay on Danish radio. The album subsequently became the MTV Fresh Pick of the Week.

== Track listing ==
1. "Let's Go Dancing"
2. "Not New in N.Y."
3. "Break Out Your Recorder"
4. "Roller Disco Inferno"
5. "Nation of Superstars"
6. "Mix Tape"
7. "Bonjour Mon Amie"
8. "Boys and Girls"
9. "Teenage Beats"
10. "Riots in Technicolor"
11. "Untitled"

== Reception ==
David Fricke of Rolling Stone gave the album a positive review, saying that "There’s something hoppin’ in the state of Denmark; the high velocity and new wave-guitar sunshine of this Copenhagen band.” He continues, “with nostalgic burps of lava-bubble synth and the high sharp vocal brass of Jakob Printzlau, is not afraid to sing about how great rock & roll used to be in order to get his New Wave rolling.”
