= Southern Stars =

Southern Stars might refer to:

- Southern Stars Club, a Lebanese women's association football club
- Southern Stars FC, an Australian soccer team
- Southern Stars (album), a 1984 album by Rose Tattoo
- The Australia national women's cricket team, nicknamed the Southern Stars

== See also ==
- Southern Star (disambiguation)
