= The Fashion =

Danish indie rock band

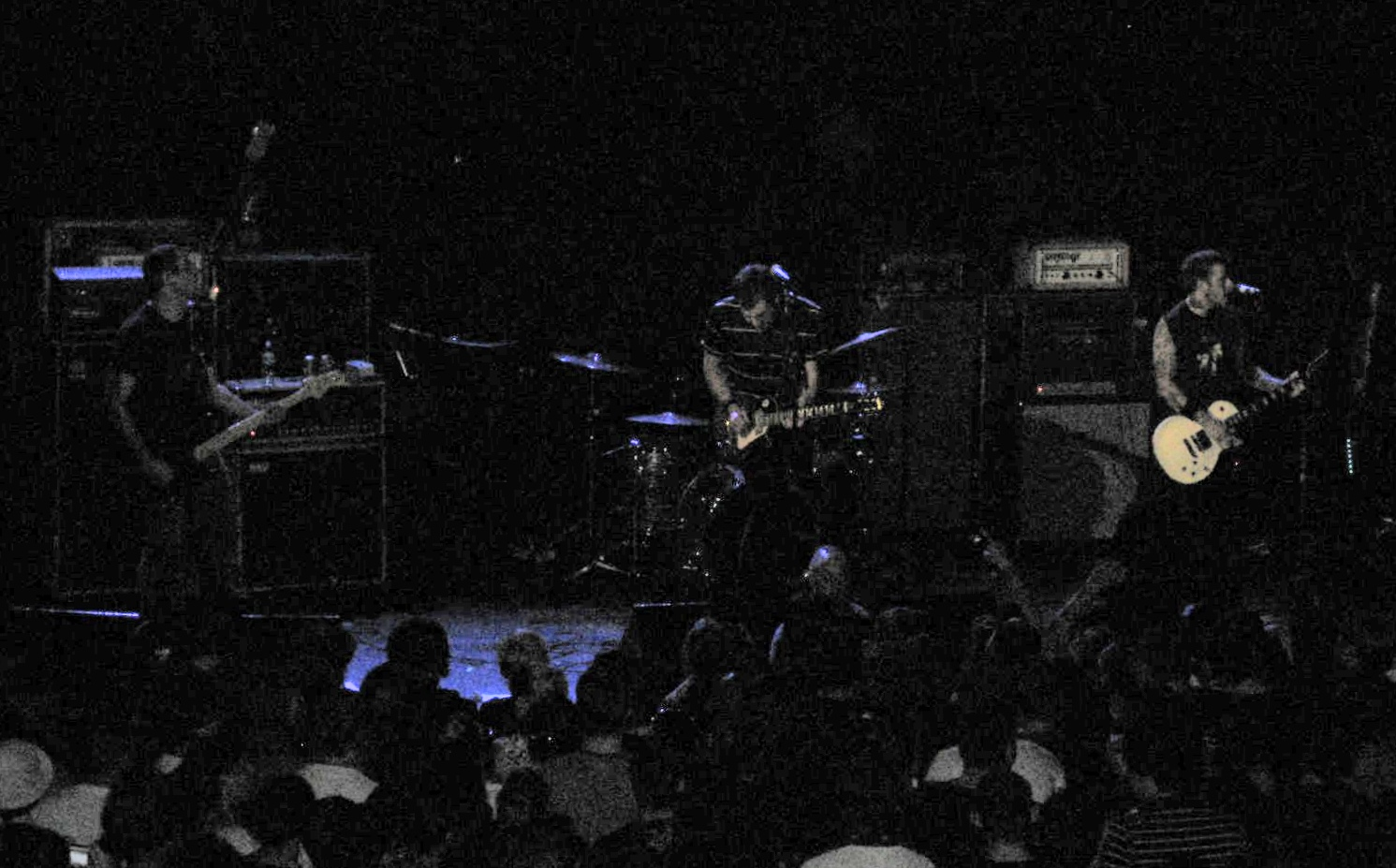
- The Fashion performing in New York City, 2008

Background information
- Origin: Copenhagen, Denmark
- Genres: Indie rock, post-punk revival, new wave, dance-punk
- Years active: 2002–2011
- Labels: RCA Victor, Epic, Red Ink
- Members: Jakob Printzlau; Anders Find Axelsen; Jacob Ankær; Christian Lignell Bækholm
- Past members: Christoffer Griebel
- Website: https://web.archive.org/web/20070807164729/http://www.thefashion.dk/

The Fashion was an indie rock band hailing from Copenhagen, Denmark. Their musical style has been compared to a mix of The Rapture, Beastie Boys, Head Automatica, and LCD Soundsystem. The Fashion's debut album Rock Rock Kiss Kiss Combo was released in Denmark in September 2003 and gained extensive airplay across Danish radio, receiving MTV's Fresh Pick of the Week and positive reviews from Rolling Stone's David Fricke.

After some lineup changes, the band began work on its self-titled sophomore effort in the summer of 2006 with Fridolin (Outlandish, Moi Caprice). The music video for lead single "Solo Impala (Take the Money and Run)" debuted winter 2007 on MTV and made its film festival premiere at 2008's SXSW. Following their appearance at SXSW, The Fashion had sold out shows in New York City and released a preview EP through iTunes. The Fashion's second album had a physical release on 13 May from Epic Records - their first release in North America. The single "Like Knives" was featured in the Electronic Arts racing video game, Need for Speed Undercover and in Madden 2009. The band disbanded in early 2011 feeling as if they could no longer "lift the band to new heights."

== Discography ==
=== Singles & Videos ===
- Let's Go Dancing - (2003) (official video on YouTube)
- Roller Disco Inferno - (2003) (official video on YouTube)
- Dead Boys - (2007) (official video on YouTube)
- Letters From The Ambulance - (2007) (official video on YouTube)
- Solo Impala (Take The Money and Run) - (2007) (official video on YouTube)
- Like Knives - (2008) (official video on YouTube [now taken down])

=== Albums ===
- Rock Rock Kiss Kiss Combo (15 September 2003)
- The Fashion (19 February 2007 Denmark, 8 January 2008 Europe, 13 May 2008 North America)

=== EPs ===
- The Fashion EP (11 January 2008)
- Gerhardo EP (2009)

=== Compilation appearances ===
- His Way, Our Way (Sinatra Tribute)
- Saluting the Crunchy Frog-a-Logue (2009)
