= The Fashion (album) =

Studio album by The Fashion
- Released: (Denmark) February 19, 2007 (Europe) January 8, 2008 (United States) (Canada) May 13, 2008
- Recorded: 2004–June 2006
- Genre: Indie rock, alternative rock, post-punk revival
- Length: 34:42
- Label: RCA Victor

The Fashion chronology
Rock Rock Kiss Kiss Combo (2003)	The Fashion (2007)

The Fashion is the self-titled second album by Danish indie rock band The Fashion. It was originally released digitally in early-2007 and was followed by a physical release in Europe on January 8, 2008, by RCA Victor, and a North American release by Epic Records on May 13, 2008.

== Track listing ==
1. Dead Boys - 2:34
2. Solo Impala (Take the Money and Run) - 3:07
3. Untitled - 3:35
4. Letters from the Ambulance - 4:02
5. The Funeral Dept. - 3:47
6. Like Knives - 4:14
7. Alabaster - 2:45
8. Mathematics - 3:14
9. Apt. - 3:24
10. Vampires with Gold Teeth - 4:01

== Videos ==
- Solo Impala (Take The Money and Run) - (2008) (official video on YouTube)
- Like Knives - (2009) (official video on YouTube)
- Letters from the Ambulance - (2007) (Official video on Dailymotion)
- Dead Boys - (2009) (Official video on YouTube)

== Charts ==
Chart (2008)	Peak position
U.S. Alternative Chart (Mediabase) (single: Solo Impala).	228
