= Delilah (Anderson East album) =

Studio album by Anderson East
- Released: July 10, 2015
- Studio: FAME (Muscle Shoals); Low Country Sound; Sound Emporium; Farmland
- Genre: Rhythm and blues, Southern soul, Americana, rock
- Length: 32:19
- Label: Low Country Sound
- Producer: Dave Cobb

Anderson East chronology
Flowers of the Broken Hearted (2012)	Delilah (2015)	Encore (2018)

Delilah is the third studio album and first major label release by American musician Anderson East. The album was released on July 10, 2015, via Low Country Sound an imprint of Elektra.

== Background ==
East stated that he chose the album name from Delilah, one of the characters in the seventh book of the Bible called Book of Judges, which features the famous story of Samson and Delilah. "Samson was like the strongest man alive. God blessed him with this superhuman strength but it all laid in his hair. He’s infatuated with [Delilah], totally in love with her, told her secrets and that was the crumbling of the strongest man that’s ever lived. That’s kind of the thread through the record: the woman that saved the crumbled man."

The George Jackson song, "Find 'Em, Fool 'Em and Forget 'Em" came from a visit to the FAME Studios, located in North Alabama, where the record was recorded. The album was partially recorded live there, with recording also taking place at Low Country Sound's studio, Sound Emporium, and Farmland Studio.

East co-wrote the song "Quit You" with singer-songwriter Chris Stapleton, who Dave Cobb worked with previously, and brought into the studio so the two could meet. They hit it off and wrote the song.

== Critical reception ==
Critical reception was generally positive. Starpulse gave the album four stars. American Songwriter gave the album four out of five stars.

== Track listing ==
No.	Title	Writer(s)	Length
1.	"Only You"	Anderson East; Charlie Pate; Aaron Raitiere	2:46
2.	"Satisfy Me"	East; Pate; Raitiere	2:35
3.	"Find 'Em, Fool 'Em and Forget 'Em"	George Jackson; Rick Hall	2:34
4.	"Devil in Me"	East; Mark Stephen Jones; Raitiere	3:41
5.	"All I'll Ever Need"	East; Justin Glasco	3:18
6.	"Quit You"	East; Chris Stapleton	2:49
7.	"What a Woman Wants to Hear"	East; Jon Decious	4:14
8.	"Lonely"	East; Jillia Jackson	3:28
9.	"Keep the Fire Burning"	East; Mark Stephen Jones; Raitiere	2:42
10.	"Lying in Her Arms"	East	4:12
Total length:			32:19

== Personnel ==
Credits adapted from the album's liner notes.

=== Musicians ===
- Anderson East – vocals (all tracks), electric guitar (tracks 2, 7, 9, 10), Mellotron (4, 5, 7, 10), acoustic guitar (4, 7, 10), mandolin (9), Wurlitzer (10)
- Dave Cobb – electric guitar (1–3, 6–8), percussion (1, 2, 4–10), acoustic guitar (4, 9, 10), Mellotron (7)
- Chris Powell – drums, percussion
- Brian Allen – bass (1–6, 8–10), electric guitar (1, 9), upright bass (7)
- Mike Hicks – organ (1–3, 8, 9), piano (1, 3, 6, 9), Wurlitzer (2, 6, 8)
- Jim Hoke – tenor saxophone, baritone saxophone (1–3, 6, 8, 9)
- Steve Herrman – trumpet (1–3, 6, 8, 9)
- Kristen Rogers – background vocals
- Melvin "Maestro" Lightford – piano, organ (4)
- Danny Mitchell – piano (5)
- Eamon McLoughlin – violin, viola, cello (10)

=== Technical and visuals ===
- Dave Cobb – production, arrangements
- Darrell Thorp – mixing
- Vance Powell – additional mixing (1), engineering
- John Netti – engineering (1, 4, 5, 7, 9, 10)
- Drew Long – engineering assistance
- Michael Stankiewicz – engineering assistance
- Pete Lyman – mastering
- Andrew Brightman – production coordination
- Shane Stern – production coordination
- Neil Krug – creative direction, photography
- Virgilio Tzaj – art direction, design

== Charts ==
Chart (2016)	Peak position
UK Americana (OCC)	25
US Americana/Folk Albums (Billboard)	7
US Top Rock Albums (Billboard)	28
