= Brent Cobb =

American songwriter-singer (born 1986)

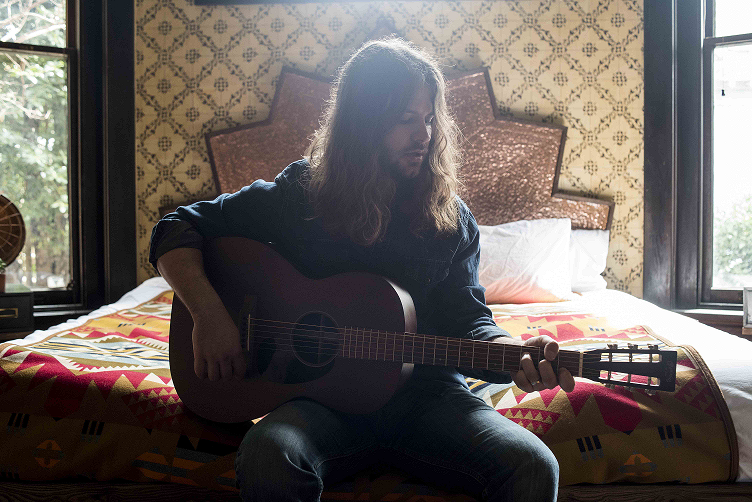
- Cobb in a 2016 publicity photo

Background information
- Born: August 1, 1986 (age 40); Americus, Georgia
- Genres: Country; Americana; outlaw country; Southern rock
- Occupation: Singer-songwriter
- Years active: 2008–present
- Labels: Low Country Sound; Elektra; Atlantic; Warner Music Group
- Website: brentcobbmusic.com

Brent Cobb (born August 1, 1986) is an American country music singer-songwriter and artist. Cobb has released six studio albums and one EP. His most recent album, Southern Star, was released on September 22, 2023. Providence Canyon was his second major-label LP with Low Country Sound, an imprint of Elektra. His previous album Shine On Rainy Day peaked at number 17 on Billboard's Top Country Albums chart. Cobb also received a 2018 Grammy Award nomination for this album. Cobb has written songs for a variety of country artists, including Luke Bryan, Kellie Pickler, Kenny Chesney, Miranda Lambert, Little Big Town, the Oak Ridge Boys as well as many others.

== Early life ==
Cobb was born in Americus, Georgia but raised in the nearby town of Ellaville. His father, Patrick Cobb, was an appliance repairman who was also in a rock band. Brent made his vocal debut at age 7 when he sang Tim McGraw's "Don't Take the Girl" with his father's band in a Richland, Georgia festival performance.

As a teenager, Cobb fronted a local band called Mile Marker 5 which had some regional success and opened for larger stars. At age 16, Cobb met his cousin, Dave Cobb, at a family funeral. Dave was a producer based in Los Angeles, and Brent gave him a demo CD. Dave, along with Shooter Jennings, would later fly Brent to Los Angeles to record his debut album, No Place Left to Leave.

== Career ==
Cobb recorded his debut album, No Place Left to Leave, in 2006 with his cousin while in Los Angeles. However, after some time in this period, he decided to return to Georgia.

Country star and acquaintance Luke Bryan suggested Cobb move to Nashville which, in turn, he eventually did in 2008. Initially, Cobb worked as a photo developer at Walgreens but eventually managed to negotiate a songwriting contract with Carnival Music Publishing within the year.

After obtaining his songwriting contract, Cobb then went on to write a variety of songs for many prominent stars, such as Luke Bryan's "Tailgate Blues", David Nail and Frankie Ballard's "Grandpa's Farm", Kellie Pickler's "Rockaway", Kenny Chesney's "Don't It", Miranda Lambert's "Old Sh!t", as well as numerous other performers.

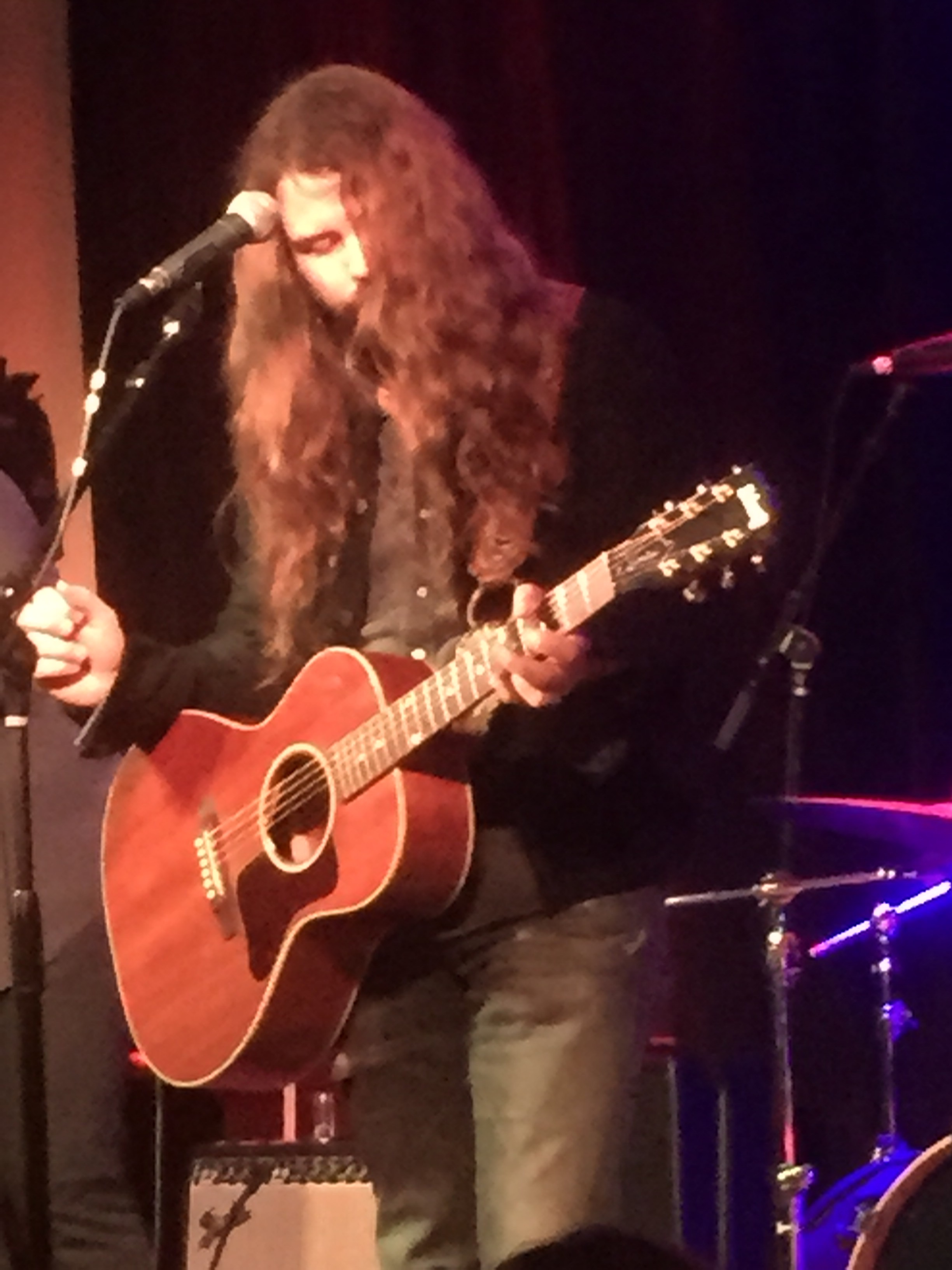
Cobb performing at the Americana Festival at 3rd & Lindsley in 2018

Cobb released a self-titled EP in 2012, and began opening for established stars such as Blake Shelton and Sara Evans, playing around 120 dates per year. In 2016, his song "Down Home" appeared on Dave Cobb's compilation album, Southern Family, alongside songs from artists like Miranda Lambert, Chris Stapleton, and Zac Brown.

On October 7, 2016, Cobb's major-label debut album, Shine On Rainy Day, was released via the Elektra Records imprint, Low Country Sound. The album peaked at number 17 on Billboard's Top Country Albums chart and at number 5 on the Top Heatseekers chart. Cobb also has received a 2018 Grammy Award nomination as Best Americana Album for his work on Shine On Rainy Day.

Throughout 2018, Cobb went on a headline tour in support of his Low Country Sound LP album called Providence Canyon, which was released May 11, 2018. Currently in 2023, Cobb was on a headline tour in support of his Ole Buddy Records LP album called Southern Star, which was released September 22, 2023.

Cobb has toured extensively as a main supporting act and special guest for Chris Stapleton on his All-American Road Show Tour. Cobb has also toured as a special guest in 2023 on the Luke Combs World Tour.

== Musical style ==
Cobb's musical style has been described as "blue collar country" with "bluegrass-leaning inclinations." Some have noted that his sound is closer to Americana than contemporary country music. Jon Freeman of the Nashville Scene described Cobb's voice as "soft and sweet, with surefooted hints of soul." His voice has been compared to Willie Nelson, Al Green, and Merle Haggard. Dave Cobb, who produced Shine On Rainy Day, described the album as "pure rural, country, soul-filled music."

Lyrically, Cobb's songs often detail experiences of rural living in a conversational tone and "the influence of his Southern raising is weaved through nearly every note and line." Writing for Billboard, Elias Leight noted that Cobb is "a laid back narrator, easygoing even when forlorn."

== Discography ==
=== Studio albums ===
Title	Album details	Peak chart positions			Sales
Title	Album details	US Country	US Heat	US Folk	Sales
No Place Left to Leave	Release: August 2006; Label: Beverly Martel; Format: CD	—	—	—	
Shine on Rainy Day	Release: October 7, 2016; Label: Low Country Sound/Elektra; Format: CD, digital download, vinyl	17	5	16	US: 3,400
Providence Canyon	Release: May 11, 2018; Label: Low Country Sound/Elektra; Format: CD, digital download, vinyl	—	2	23	US:3,400
Keep 'Em on They Toes	Release: October 2, 2020; Label: Thirty Tigers; Format: CD, digital download, vinyl	—	—	—	
And Now Let's Turn to Page...	Release: January 28, 2022; Label: Thirty Tigers; Format: CD, digital download, vinyl	—	—	—	
Southern Star	Release: September 22, 2023; Label: Ol' Buddy Records; Format: CD, digital download, vinyl	—	—	—	
"—" denotes releases that did not chart

=== EPs ===
- Brent Cobb (2012)

=== Songwriting ===
Selected list of written songs showing album, artist, and year of release
Song	Year	Artist	Album
"Tailgate Blues"	2011	Luke Bryan	Tailgates & Tanlines
"Go Outside and Dance"	2011	Eli Young Band	Non-album release
"Grandpa's Farm"	2011	Frankie Ballard	Frankie Ballard
"Grandpa's Farm"	2011	David Nail	The Sound of a Million Dreams
"Rockaway (The Rockin' Chair Song)"	2012	Kellie Pickler	100 Proof
"Pavement Ends"	2012	Little Big Town	Tornado
"Old Shit"	2014	Miranda Lambert	Platinum
"Stay All Night"	2014	Little Big Town	Pain Killer
"Don't It"	2014	Kenny Chesney	The Big Revival
"Sweet By and By"	2016	Miranda Lambert	Southern Family
