= Encore (Anderson East album) =

Studio album by Anderson East
- Released: January 12, 2018
- Studios: RCA Studio A (Nashville, Tennessee)
- Genre: Southern soul
- Length: 40:48
- Label: Elektra
- Producers: Dave Cobb; Greg Nadel

Anderson East chronology
Delilah (2015)	Encore (2018)	Maybe We Never Die (2021)

Professional ratings
Aggregate scores
Source	Rating
Metacritic	74/100
Review scores
Source	Rating
AllMusic	4/5 stars
American Songwriter	4/5 stars
Paste	7.8/10
PopMatters	8/10

Encore is the fourth studio album by American musician Anderson East. It was released on January 12, 2018, by Elektra Records. "All on my Mind" earned East his first Grammy Award nomination for Best American Roots Performance.

== Critical reception ==
Encore was met with "generally favorable" reviews from critics. At Metacritic, which assigns a weighted average rating out of 100 to reviews from mainstream publications, this release received an average score of 74, based on 7 reviews.

=== Accolades ===
Accolades for
Publication	Accolade	Rank
AllMusic	AllMusic's Top Folk and American Albums of 2018	N/A
PopMatters	PopMatters' Top 50 Albums of 2018 – Mid-Year	N/A

== Track listing ==
Encore track listing
No.	Title	Writer(s)	Length
1.	"King for a Day"	Anderson East; Chris Stapleton; Morgane Stapleton	3:44
2.	"This Too Shall Last"	East; Natalie Hemby; Aaron Raitiere	3:42
3.	"House Is a Building"	East; Hemby; Raitiere	3:31
4.	"Sorry You're Sick"	Ted Hawkins	2:27
5.	"If You Keep Leaving Me"	East; Raitiere; C. Stapleton	4:13
6.	"Girlfriend"	East; Raitiere; Tim Bergling; Dave Cobb	2:53
7.	"Surrender"	East; Raitiere; Adam Hood	2:56
8.	"All on My Mind"	East; Raitiere; Johnny McDaid; Ed Sheeran	3:44
9.	"Without You"	East; Steve McEwan	4:18
10.	"Somebody Pick Up My Pieces"	Willie Nelson	4:54
11.	"Cabinet Door"	East; Jillia Jackson	4:21
Total length:			40:48

== Personnel ==
Musicians

- Anderson East – lead vocals (all tracks), electric guitar (2–4, 7, 9), hand clap (4)
- Dave Cobb – acoustic guitar (1, 3, 4, 9), horn arrangement (1, 3, 4, 6), percussion (2, 4, 6, 7), electric guitar (3–5, 8), hand clap (4), bass (6, 7)
- Kristen Rogers – background vocals (1, 2, 4–9, 11)
- Brian Allen – bass (1–3, 5, 8, 9), hand clap (4)
- Chris Powell – drums (1–9), congas (1), percussion (4, 6, 7, 9), bass (8)
- Chris Stapleton – electric guitar (1, 4)
- Ben Clark – horn arrangement (1, 3, 4, 6), trumpet (1, 3, 4, 6, 7)
- Nate Heffron – horn arrangement (1, 3, 4, 6), saxophone (1, 3, 4, 6, 7)
- Philip Townes – organ (1, 3, 4, 7, 8, 11), keyboards (2, 5, 7, 9), Mellotron (3, 8), piano (3, 6, 9, 11), hand clap (4), Moog (4, 6), synthesizer (8)
- Ryan Adams – lead electric guitar (2)
- Mark Neill – percussion (2), tambourine (8)
- Emily Nelson – cello (3, 8, 9)
- Kristin Wilkinson – string arrangement, viola (3, 8, 9)
- David Angell – violin (3, 8, 9)
- David Davidson – violin (3, 8, 9)
- Zach Williams – background vocals (4)
- Tim Bergling – piano (6)

Technical

- Dave Cobb – production
- Greg Nadel – production (8)
- Pete Lyman – mastering
- Eddie Spear – mixing (1–7, 9), engineering (2, 4–8)
- Mark Neill – mixing (2), additional production (8)
- Michael Brauer – mixing (8)
- Matt Ross-Spang – engineering (1, 3, 4, 7, 9)
- Brandon Bell – engineering (3)
- Charlie Stavish – additional recording (2)
- Gena Johnson – engineering assistance

== Charts ==
Chart (2018)	Peak position
Swiss Albums (Schweizer Hitparade)	53
UK Americana (OCC)	17
US Billboard 200	48
US Americana/Folk Albums (Billboard)	3
US Top Rock Albums (Billboard)	5
