= Southern Star (Brent Cobb album) =

Studio album by Brent Cobb
- Released: September 22, 2023
- Studio: Capricorn Sound
- Length: 34:09
- Label: Ol' Buddy
- Producer: Brent Cobb

Brent Cobb chronology
And Now Let's Turn to Page... (2022)	Southern Star (2023)

Southern Star is the fifth studio album by American musician Brent Cobb. It was released on September 22, 2023. by Ol' Buddy Records.

== Critical reception ==
Professional ratings
Aggregate scores
Source	Rating
Metacritic	77/100
Review scores
Source	Rating
AllMusic	4/5 stars
PopMatters	7/10

Southern Star was met with "generally favorable" reviews from critics. At Metacritic, which assigns a weighted average rating out of 100 to reviews from mainstream publications, this release received an average score of 77, based on 4 reviews.

Stephen Thomas Erlewine of AllMusic wrote: "Cobb's honeyed drawl seems particularly thick here. It almost seems like another instrument in the mix. His words are worth hearing, but the appeal of Southern Star lies in its mellow vibe."

=== Accolades ===
Publications' year-end list appearances for Southern Star
Critic/Publication	List	Rank	Ref
PopMatters	PopMatters' Top 15 Country Albums	33	

== Track listing ==
Southern Star track listing
No.	Title	Writer(s)	Length
1.	"Southern Star"	Brent Cobb; Adam Hood	3:06
2.	"It's a Start"	Cobb; Layne Cobb; Patrick Cobb	2:35
3.	"Livin' the Dream"	Cobb; Josh Morningstar	2:40
4.	"Patina"	Layne Cobb	3:19
5.	"'On't Know When"	Chris Canterbury; Ben Chapman; Cobb	3:18
6.	"Kick the Can"	Cobb; Caleb Cripe; Morgan Cripe; Daniel Rigney	3:37
7.	"Devil Ain't Done"	Jacob Bryant; Jami Grooms; Wyatt McCubbin; Joel Shoemake	3:05
8.	"When Country Came Back to Town"	Cobb	5:07
9.	"Miss Ater"	Sally Jaye	4:14
10.	"Shade Tree"	A. Cobb; B. Cobb; L. Cobb	3:08
Total length:			34:09

== Charts ==
Chart performance for Southern Star
Chart (2023)	Peak position
UK Americana Albums (OCC)	33
