= Anderson East =

American singer-songwriter

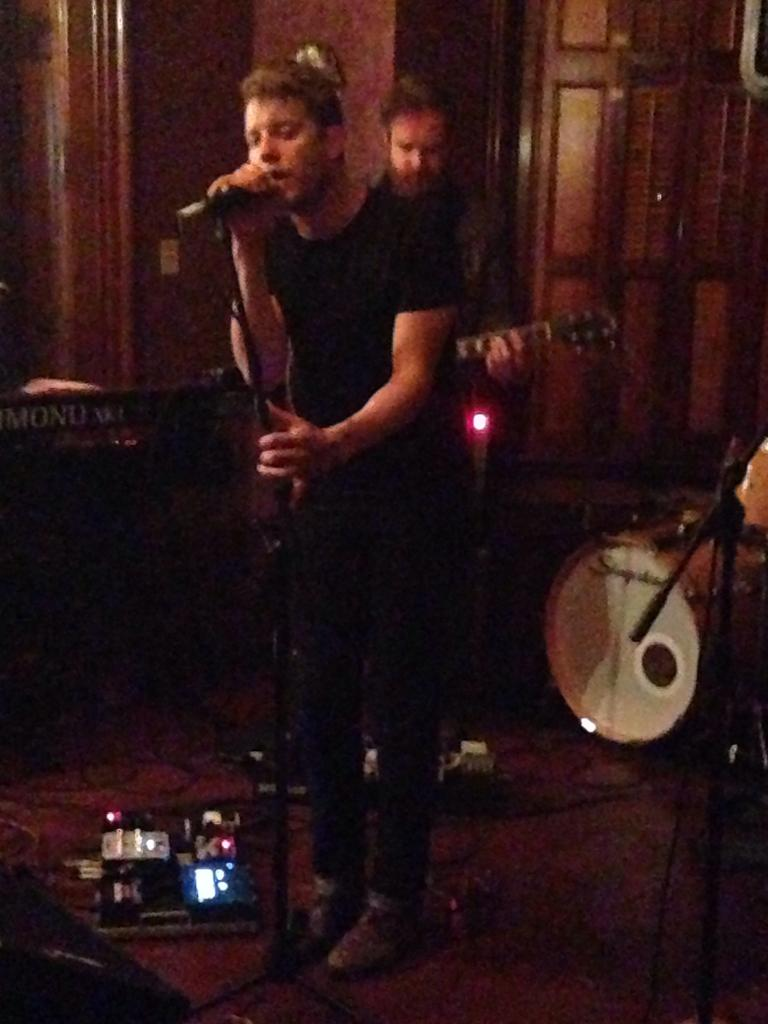
- East performing at the Renwick Mansion in Davenport, Iowa

Background information
- Born: Michael Cameron Anderson; July 17, 1988 (age 38)
- Origin: Athens, Alabama, United States
- Genres: Southern soul; R&B; Americana; roots rock; blues rock
- Occupations: Lead vocalist; singer-songwriter
- Instruments: Vocals; guitar; piano
- Years active: 2009–present
- Labels: Low Country Sound; Elektra
- Website: andersoneast.com

Michael Cameron Anderson (born July 17, 1987), known professionally as Anderson East, is an American musician from Athens, Alabama, who currently is based in Nashville, Tennessee. East's sound is notable for combining R&B, soul, and roots rock. His song "Satisfy Me" was released in March 2015 and received consistent radio airplay. His major-label record debut, Delilah, was released on the Low Country Sound, an imprint of the Elektra label, in July 2015.

== Early life ==
East went to Athens High School in Athens, Alabama. East wrote his first song, called "Brains", which he played at his 7th grade talent show. Inspired by the musician Ben Folds, East taught himself piano and started writing music in high school.

His grandfather was a Baptist preacher, his father sang in the church choir, and his mother played the piano in church when he was young.

East attended college in Murfreesboro, Tennessee, at Middle Tennessee State University, studying to become a music engineer. After completing his studies, he later moved to Nashville.

== Career ==
In the beginning stage of his career, East opened for Holly Williams and ended up playing guitar and singing harmonies with her. At the same time, he worked as a session musician as well as a recording engineer to provide a way to make ends meet.

East began his musical career in 2009, self-releasing an album titled Closing Credits for a Fire under the name Mike Anderson. He then began recording under the name Anderson East with the release of an EP titled Fire Demos.

East's self-released debut album, Flowers of the Broken Hearted in 2012, was made up of two records: one record which he recorded in Los Angeles with producer Chris Seefried and session players Charlie Gillingham, Don Heffington and Rob Wasserman, and a second recorded in Nashville with Tim Brennan and Daniel Scobey. He funded the record as a PledgeMusic project with a percentage of the proceeds going to Water Aid, a nonprofit organization that brings water to communities that do not have clean drinking water.

East's major label debut album, Delilah, was released by Low Country Sound, an imprint of Elektra in July 2015. It was produced by Dave Cobb (Jason Isbell, Sturgill Simpson, Chris Stapleton) and features a song by George Jackson recorded at the legendary FAME Studios in Muscle Shoals, Alabama.

In 2017, East appeared on the Fifty Shades Darker soundtrack album, performing the track "What Would It Take" which he co-wrote with Aaron Raitere. The soundtrack debuted at number one on the Billboard 200. East also covered Brandi Carlile's song "Josephine" to be included for her charity album Cover Stories.

On August 15, 2017, East released the first single from his upcoming album Encore, "All On My Mind", which he subsequently performed on October 13, 2017 in an appearance on The Ellen DeGeneres Show.

== Discography ==
=== Studio albums ===
Title	Album details	Peak positions			
Title	Album details	US	US Folk	US Heat	US Rock
Closing Credits for a Fire (as Mike Anderson)	Release date: 2009; Label: Self-released	—	—	—	—
Flowers of the Broken Hearted	Release date: 2012; Label: Self-released	—	—	—	—
Delilah	Release date: July 10, 2015; Label: Elektra / Low Country Sound	—	7	2	28
Encore	Release date: January 12, 2018; Label: Elektra / Low Country Sound	48	3	—	5
Maybe We Never Die	Release date: August 20, 2021; Label: Elektra / Low Country Sound	—	—	—	—
Worthy	Release date: May 30, 2025; Label: Elektra / Low Country Sound	—	—	—	—
"—" denotes releases that did not chart

=== Extended plays ===
- 2010: Fire Demos
- 2011: Transitive Property
- 2015: The Muscle Shoals Sessions: Live From FAME

=== Singles ===
Year	Single	Peak positions			Album
Year	Single	US AAA	US Adult Pop	US Rock	Album
2015	"Satisfy Me"	18	—	—	Delilah
2016	"Devil in Me"	29	—	—	Delilah
2017	"All on My Mind"	1	34	35	Encore
2018	"Girlfriend"	5	—	—	Encore
2018	"This Too Shall Last"	40	—	—	Encore
2021	"Madelyn"	12	—	—	Maybe We Never Die
2021	"Drugs"	—	—	—	Maybe We Never Die
2021	"Hood of My Car"	—	—	—	Maybe We Never Die
2025	"Say I Love You"	33	—	—	Worthy
"—" denotes releases that did not chart

=== Other charted songs ===
Year	Single	Peak positions	Album
Year	Single	US Rock	Album
2017	"What Would It Take"	29	Fifty Shades Darker: Original Motion Picture Soundtrack

=== Music videos ===
Year	Title	Director
2016	"Devil in Me"	Lauren Sieczkowski
2016	"Learning"	
2017	"All on My Mind"	
2017	"King For A Day"	
2018	"Girlfriend"	
2021	"Madelyn"	Nico Poalillo
2021	"Drugs"	Sydney Ostrander & Nico Poalillo
2021	"Hood of My Car"	Nico Poalillo

=== Songwriting and Production Credits ===
Year	Title	Artist(s)	Album	Credits
2026	"The Highway"	Slater Nalley	The Highway - Single	Producer/Recording Engineer/Acoustic Guitar
2026	"Feel The Cold"	Foy Vance	IF:WE	Producer/Electric Guitar
2026	"Don't Move"	Foy Vance	IF:WE	Producer/Electric Guitar
2026	"Stoke My Fire"	Foy Vance	IF:WE	Producer
2026	"Know By Now"	Foy Vance	IF:WE	Producer
2026	"Concubine"	Foy Vance	IF:WE	Producer/Mixing Engineer
2026	"Bridge Over Troubled Water"	The Oak Ridge Boys	Buried Treasures	Producer/Recording Engineer/Acoustic Guitar/Electric Guitar
2026	"Buried Treasure"	The Oak Ridge Boys	Buried Treasures	Producer/Recording Engineer/Acoustic Guitar/Electric Guitar
2026	"Deep Water"	The Oak Ridge Boys	Buried Treasures	Producer/Recording Engineer/Acoustic Guitar/Electric Guitar
2026	"How Great Thou Art"	The Oak Ridge Boys	Buried Treasures	Producer/Recording Engineer/Acoustic Guitar/Electric Guitar
2026	"Lean on Me"	The Oak Ridge Boys	Buried Treasures	Producer/Recording Engineer/Acoustic Guitar/Electric Guitar
2026	"Live Forever"	The Oak Ridge Boys	Buried Treasures	Producer/Recording Engineer/Acoustic Guitar/Electric Guitar
2026	"Softly and Tenderly"	The Oak Ridge Boys	Buried Treasures	Producer/Recording Engineer/Acoustic Guitar/Electric Guitar
2026	"Stardust"	The Oak Ridge Boys	Buried Treasures	Producer/Recording Engineer/Acoustic Guitar/Electric Guitar
2026	"What a Wonderful World"	The Oak Ridge Boys	Buried Treasures	Producer/Recording Engineer/Acoustic Guitar/Electric Guitar
2026	"You Are So Beautiful"	The Oak Ridge Boys	Buried Treasures	Producer/Recording Engineer/Acoustic Guitar/Electric Guitar
2026	"Shoes"	Penelope Road	Maybe In Time	Co-Writer
2026	"Dreams"	Allen Stone	Dreams - Single	Producer/Recording Engineer
2026	"Stranger With Age"	Rita Wilson	Sound of a Woman (Deluxe)	Producer/Engineer/Acoustic Guitar/Electric Guitar
2026	"What Do You See"	Slater Nalley	What Do You See? - Single	Producer/Engineer
2026	"The Nerve"	Laci Kaye Booth	Love Ain't For The Faint Of Heart	Writer
2026	"Love Ain't For The Faint Of Heart"	Laci Kaye Booth	Love Ain't For The Faint Of Heart	Writer/Producer/Additional Engineer/Acoustic Guitar
2026	"SWEET MAGNOLIA"	Bonnie Bishop	SWEET MAGNOLIA - Single	Mixer
2026	"Unlove You"	Harper O'Neill	Unlove You - Single	Writer/Producer
2026	"Skyline"	David Nail	Flowers	Writer/Producer/Recording Engineer/Mixing Engineer/Electric Guitar
2026	"The Crown"	David Nail	Flowers	Writer/Producer/Recording Engineer/Mixing Engineer/Electric Guitar/Acoustic Guitar
2026	"Broken In"	David Nail	Flowers	Writer/Producer/Recording Engineer/Mixing Engineer
2026	"Time Ran Out"	David Nail	Flowers	Writer/Producer/Recording Engineer/Mixing Engineer
2026	"Book Of Us"	David Nail	Flowers	Producer/Recording Engineer/Mixing Engineer/Acoustic Guitar/Electric Guitar
2026	"I'll Break Yours Too"	David Nail	Flowers	Writer/Producer/Recording Engineer/Mixing Engineer/Electric Guitar/Background Vocals
2026	"Fare Thee Well"	David Nail	Flowers	Writer/Producer/Recording Engineer/Mixing Engineer/Acoustic Guitar
2026	"She Knows"	David Nail	Flowers	Writer/Producer/Recording Engineer/Mixing Engineer/Acoustic Guitar
2026	"I Bought The Flowers"	David Nail	Flowers	Writer/Producer/Recording Engineer/Mixing Engineer/Acoustic Guitar
2026	"Riverbank"	David Nail, Lori McKenna	Flowers	Writer/Producer/Recording Engineer/Mixing Engineer/Electric Guitar/Acoustic Guitar
2026	"Hey Georgia"	Slater Nalley	All Over Again - Single	Producer/Recording Engineer
2026	"Stopped Loving You"	Slater Nalley	All Over Again - Single	Writer/Producer/Recording Engineer
2026	"So Into It"	Slater Nalley	All Over Again - Single	Writer/Producer/Recording Engineer
2026	"These Please"	Slater Nalley	All Over Again - Single	Producer/Recording Engineer
2026	"All Over Again"	Slater Nalley	All Over Again - Single	Writer/Producer/Recording Engineer
2026	"Leave It Up To Me"	Slater Nalley	All Over Again - Single	Producer/Recording Engineer
2026	"Songs About You"	Solon Holt	Songs About You	Producer/Mixing Engineer/Background Vocalist
2026	"In My Head"	Solon Holt	Songs About You	Producer/Mixing Engineer/Recording Engineer
2026	"Sad Country Songs"	Solon Holt	Songs About You	Producer/Mixing Engineer/Recording Engineer
2026	"So Long"	Solon Holt	Songs About You	Producer/Mixing Engineer/Recording Engineer
2026	"Mellow"	Solon Holt	Songs About You	Producer/Mixing Engineer
2026	"Make Me Wonder"	Solon Holt	Songs About You	Producer/Mixing Engineer/Recording Engineer/Slide Guitar
2026	"Interlude"	Solon Holt	Songs About You	Producer/Mixing Engineer
2026	"Till You Don't"	Solon Holt	Songs About You	Producer/Mixing Engineer
2026	"Only The Lonely"	Solon Holt	Songs About You	Producer/Mixing Engineer/Recording Engineer
2026	"Somebody"	Solon Holt	Songs About You	Producer/Mixing Engineer/Recording Engineer
2026	"Good Does It Do"	Solon Holt	Songs About You	Producer/Mixing Engineer/Recording Engineer/Acoustic Guitar/Percussion
2026	"Too Late"	Solon Holt	Songs About You	Producer/Mixing Engineer
2026	"Hero"	Solon Holt	Songs About You	Producer/Mixing Engineer/Background Vocalist/Percussion
2026	"Otherside"	Waylon Wyatt	Dustpiles	Writer/Producer/Recording Engineer/Mixing Engineer/Acoustic Guitar
2026	"Wishful Thinking"	Waylon Wyatt	Dustpiles	Writer/Producer/Recording Engineer/Acoustic Guitar/Electric Guitar
2026	"No One Else"	Waylon Wyatt	Dustpiles	Writer/Producer/Recording Engineer/Mixing Engineer/Background Vocalist/Drum Kit/Percussion/Bass/Acoustic Guitar/Piano/Hammond Organ
2026	"The Dress"	Waylon Wyatt	Dustpiles	Writer/Producer/Recording Engineer/Mixing Engineer/Acoustic Guitar
2026	"Body Heat"	Waylon Wyatt	Dustpiles	Writer/Producer/Recording Engineer/Acoustic Guitar/Banjo
2026	"Call Me When You're Home"	Surfaces	Call Me When You're Home - Single	Composer/Lyricist/Studio Producer
2026	"These Please"	Slater Nalley	These Please - Single	Engineer/Producer
2026	"Hey Georgia"	Slater Nalley	Hey Georgia - Single	Engineer/Producer
2026	"Sad Country Songs"	Solon Holt	Sad Country Songs - Single	Producer/Recording Engineer/Mixing Engineer
2026	"Just Drivin'"	Presley Haile	Just Drivin' - Single	Writer/Mixing Engineer/Producer
2026	"Alabama Beauty Queen"	Kashus Culpepper	Act 1	Vocal Producer/Vocal Engineer
2026	"Woman"	Kashus Culpepper	Act 1	Composer/Lyricist/Vocal Producer/Vocal Engineer
2026	"Break Me Like"	Kashus Culpepper	Act 1	Vocal Producer/Vocal Engineer
2026	"Stay"	Kashus Culpepper	Act 1	Vocal Producer/Vocal Engineer
2026	"Mean to Me"	Kashus Culpepper	Act 1	Vocal Producer/Vocal Engineer
2026	"Better Weather"	Kashus Culpepper	Act 1	Vocal Producer/Vocal Engineer
2026	"That's the Feeling"	Kashus Culpepper	Act 1	Vocal Producer/Vocal Engineer
2026	"In Her Eyes"	Kashus Culpepper	Act 1	Vocal Producer/Vocal Engineer
2026	"Is It True"	Kashus Culpepper	Act 1	Vocal Producer/Vocal Engineer
2026	"House On A Hill"	Kashus Culpepper	Act 1	Vocal Producer/Vocal Engineer
2026	"Cherry Rose"	Kashus Culpepper	Act 1	Vocal Producer/Vocal Engineer
2026	"Everything's Different"	Ben Chapman	Feet On Fire	Studio Producer/Acoustic Guitar/Electric Guitar
2026	"Out In The Country"	Ben Chapman	Feet On Fire	Studio Producer/Acoustic Guitar/Electric Guitar
2026	"Feet On Fire"	Ben Chapman	Feet On Fire	Composer/Studio Producer/Acoustic Guitar/Electric Guitar
2026	"All Day"	Ben Chapman	Feet On Fire	Studio Producer/Acoustic Guitar/Electric Guitar
2026	"You Say Jump"	Ben Chapman	Feet On Fire	Composer/Studio Producer/Acoustic Guitar/Electric Guitar
2026	"Missing You"	Ben Chapman	Feet On Fire	Composer/Studio Producer/Acoustic Guitar/Electric Guitar
2026	"So Long"	Ben Chapman	Feet On Fire	Studio Producer/Acoustic Guitar/Electric Guitar
2026	"Takes a Dreamer"	Ben Chapman	Feet On Fire	Composer/Studio Producer/Acoustic Guitar/Electric Guitar
2026	"Baby Blue"	Ben Chapman	Feet On Fire	Studio Producer/Acoustic Guitar/Electric Guitar
2026	"Sweetheart (Ain't It Hard)"	Ben Chapman	Feet On Fire	Studio Producer/Acoustic Guitar/Electric Guitar
2026	"Lucy"	Ben Chapman	Feet On Fire	Studio Producer/Background Vocalist/Acoustic Guitar/Electric Guitar
2026	"Don't Give It All Away"	Ben Chapman	Feet On Fire	Composer/Studio Producer/Background Vocalist/Acoustic Guitar/Electric Guitar
2026	"Too Close"	Conall Cafferty	Too Close - Single	Writer/Recording Engineer
2026	"What We're Doing Here"	Garrett Kato	What We're Doing Here	Writer
2025	"Make Me Wonder"	Solon Holt	Make Me Wonder - Single	Co-Producer
2025	"Make Me Wonder" (Twin Fiddle Version)	Solon Holt	Make Me Wonder - Single	Producer
2025	"Good Does It Do"	Solon Holt	Good Does It Do - Single	Producer
2025	"A Certain Someone"	Lukas Nelson	American Romance, too	Writer/Mixing Engineer/Producer/Recording Engineer
2025	"Descendants"	Wilder Woods	Curioso	Writer
2025	"Wild Fire (feat. Maggie Rose)"	Wilder Woods	Curioso	Writer
2025	"Wild Fire (The House Sessions)"	Wilder Woods	The House Sessions	Writer
2025	"Wildfire (feat Maggie Rose) - Live From The Ryman"	Wilder Woods	Live From The Ryman	
2025	"George Fucking Strait"	Laci Kaye Booth	George Fucking Strait - Single	Lyricist, Sound Engineer, Producer, Electric Guitar, Piano
2025	"Let 'Em Talk"	Ty Myers	The Select	Composer/Lyricist
2025	"I Hope You're Happy (feat. Darius Rucker"	BigXthaPlug feat Darius Rucker	I Hope You're Happy (Commentary Version)	Composer/Lyricist
2025	"Tulsa Turnaround"	Ben Chapman	Live from Overnite Studio	Producer
2025	"Peach Jam"	Ben Chapman	Live from Overnite Studio	Producer
2025	"Still Haven't Found What I'm Looking For"	Ben Chapman	Live from Overnite Studio	Producer
2025	"Disappearing Light"	Lukas Nelson/Stephen Wilson Jr.	American Romance	Producer/Recording Engineer/Acoustic Guitar
2025	"Happy Birthday"	Old Sea Brigade	If Only I Knew, Pt. 2	Writer
2025	"I'd Do Anything"	Anderson East	Worthy	Composer/Lyricist/Producer/Recording Engineer/Mixing Engineer/Vocalist/Electric Guitar/Piano/Keyboard
2025	"Anyway"	Anderson East	Worthy	Composer/Lyricist/Producer/Recording Engineer/Mixing Engineer/Vocalist/Electric Guitar
2025	"Say I Love You"	Anderson East	Worthy	Composer/Lyricist/Producer/Recording Engineer/Mixing Engineer/Vocalist/Electric Guitar
2025	"Worthy"	Anderson East	Worthy	Composer/Lyricist/Producer/Recording Engineer/Mixing Engineer/Vocalist
2025	"Never Meant To Hurt You"	Anderson East	Worthy	Composer/Lyricist/Producer/Recording Engineer/Mixing Engineer/Vocalist/Electric Guitar/Piano/Mellotron
2025	"Before it Gets Better"	Anderson East	Worthy	Composer/Lyricist/Producer/Recording Engineer/Mixing Engineer/Vocalist/Acoustic Guitar/Electric Guitar/Piano
2025	"Fool Myself"	Anderson East	Worthy	Composer/Lyricist/Producer/Recording Engineer/Mixing Engineer/Vocalist/Acoustic Guitar/Electric Guitar/Synthesizer
2025	"Reasons"	Anderson East	Worthy	Composer/Lyricist/Producer/Recording Engineer/Mixing Engineer/Vocalist/Additional Keyboard/Electric Guitar/Piano
2025	"Chasing You"	Anderson East	Worthy	Composer/Lyricist/Producer/Recording Engineer/Mixing Engineer/Vocalist/Electric Guitar
2025	"Right Where You Were Meant to Be"	Anderson East	Worthy	Composer/Lyricist/Producer/Recording Engineer/Mixing Engineer/Vocalist/Electric Guitar/Bass/Keyboard
2025	"Most Lonesome Sound"	Colby Acuff	Enjoy the Ride	Writer
2025	"Count On Me (OurVinyl Sessions)"	The Lone Bellow	The Lone Bellow | OurVinyl Sessions	Writer
2025	"Same Way"	Maggie Rose	Same Way	Writer
2024	"Almost Home"	Ben Chapman	Downbeat	Producer
2024	"State of Monterey"	Ben Chapman	Downbeat	Producer
2024	"Don't You Dare"	Ben Chapman	Downbeat	Producer
2024	"Downbeat"	Ben Chapman	Downbeat	Producer
2024	"Temporary High"	Ben Chapman	Downbeat	Producer
2024	"If I Was You"	Ben Chapman	Downbeat	Producer
2024	"Finish What You Started"	Ben Chapman	Downbeat	Producer
2024	"Baby Don't Cry, It's Saturday Night"	Ben Chapman	Downbeat	Writer/Co-Producer
2024	"America's Sweetheart"	Ben Chapman	Downbeat	Producer
2024	Tonight I'll Be Staying Here With You	Ben Chapman	Downbeat	Producer
2024	"Moments"	The Red Clay Strays	Made by These Moments	Composer/Lyricist
2024	"Pray All The Way Home"	Austin Snell	Still Bleeding	Writer
2024	"Someone Like You (with The Travelin' McCourys & Sierra Ferrell"	Lukas Nelson	Someone Like You (with The Travelin' McCourys & Sierra Ferrell - Single	Mixing Engineer
2024	"Fare The Well"	David Nali	Fare Thee Well	Composer/Lyricist/Studio Producer/Recording Engineer/Mixing Engineer/Acoustic Guitar
2024	"The Crown"	David Nali	Fare Thee Well	Composer/Lyricist/Studio Producer/Recording Engineer/Mixing Engineer/Acoustic Guitar/Electric Guitar
2024	"Hold The Door"	Cassandra Lewis	Lost in a Dream	Writer
2024	"So Bad"	Cassandra Lewis	Lost in a Dream	Writer/Piano
2024	"So Bad - Radio Edit"	Cassandra Lewis	Lost in a Dream	Writer/Piano
2024	"Never Needed"	PhilTheChandler, Anderson East	The Bridge	Writer
2023	"Whatever She Wants"	Michael Bolton	Spark of Light	Writer
2023	"Death of Me"	Wilder Woods	FEVER / SKY	Writer
2023	"Count On Me - Live"	The Lone Bellow	Live	Writer
2023	"Cold June"	Lillie Mae	Festival Eyes	Writer
2023	"Killed The Cowboy"	Dustin Lynch	Killed The Cowboy	Composer
2023	"Ol' Kentucky"	Aaron Raitiere	Ol' Kentucky - Single	Producer
2023	"I'll Never Love Again"	Aaron Raitiere	I'll Never Love Again - Single	Producer
2022	"Single Wide Dreamer"	Aaron Raitiere	Single Wide Dreamer	Producer
2022	"Everybody Else"	Aaron Raitiere	Single Wide Dreamer	Producer
2022	"For The Birds"	Aaron Raitiere	Single Wide Dreamer	Producer
2022	"Cold Soup"	Aaron Raitiere	Single Wide Dreamer	Producer
2022	"At Least We Didn't Have Any Kids"	Aaron Raitiere	Single Wide Dreamer	Writer/Producer
2022	"Dear Darlin'"	Aaron Raitiere	Single Wide Dreamer	Producer
2022	"Your Daddy Hates Me"	Aaron Raitiere	Single Wide Dreamer	Producer
2022	"Worst I Ever Had"	Aaron Raitiere	Single Wide Dreamer	Producer
2022	"Can't Rain All The Time"	Aaron Raitiere	Single Wide Dreamer	Producer
2022	"Tell Me Something True"	Aaron Raitiere	Single Wide Dreamer	Producer
2022	"You're Crazy"	Aaron Raitiere	Single Wide Dreamer	Producer
2022	"Time Will Tell"	Aaron Raitiere	Single Wide Dreamer	Producer
2022	"Maybe We Never Die (feat Foy Vance) - F.A.M.E."	Anderson East	M,W.N.D./F.A.M.E.	Writer/Guitar
2022	"Lights On - F.A.M.E."	Anderson East	M,W.N.D./F.A.M.E.	Writer/Guitar
2022	"Madelyn - F.A.M.E."	Anderson East	M,W.N.D./F.A.M.E.	Writer/Guitar
2022	"Drugs - F.A.M.E."	Anderson East	M,W.N.D./F.A.M.E.	Writer/Guitar
2022	"I Hate You - F.A.M.E."	Anderson East	M,W.N.D./F.A.M.E.	Writer/Guitar
2022	"Hood of My Car (feat Taylor Goldsmith - F.A.M.E."	Anderson East	M,W.N.D./F.A.M.E.	Writer/Guitar
2022	"Falling - F.A.M.E."	Anderson East	M,W.N.D./F.A.M.E.	Writer/Guitar
2022	"Jet Black Pontiac -F.A.M.E."	Anderson East	M,W.N.D./F.A.M.E.	Writer/Guitar
2022	"Like Nothing Ever Happened - F.A.M.E."	Anderson East	M,W.N.D./F.A.M.E.	Writer/Guitar
2022	"If You Really Love Me (feat Natalie Hemby - F.A.M.E."	Anderson East	M,W.N.D./F.A.M.E.	Writer/Guitar
2022	"Just You & I - F.A.M.E."	Anderson East	M,W.N.D./F.A.M.E.	Writer/Guitar
2022	"Interstellar Outer Space - F.A.M.E."	Anderson East	M,W.N.D./F.A.M.E.	Writer/Guitar
2022	"Just a Closer Walk with Thee"	Brent Cobb	And Now, Let's Turn to Page...	Background Vocals
2022	"When It's My TIme"	Brent Cobb	And Now, Let's Turn to Page...	Background Vocals
2022	"In the Garden"	Brent Cobb	And Now, Let's Turn to Page...	Background Vocals
2022	"Are You Washed in the Blood?"	Brent Cobb	And Now, Let's Turn to Page...	Background Vocals
2022	"Softly and Tenderly"	Brent Cobb	And Now, Let's Turn to Page...	Background Vocals
2022	"Old Rugged Cross"	Brent Cobb	And Now, Let's Turn to Page...	Background Vocals
2022	"We Should Rise"	Brent Cobb	And Now, Let's Turn to Page...	Background Vocals
2022	"Old Country Church"	Brent Cobb	And Now, Let's Turn to Page...	Background Vocals
2022	"Blessed Be the Tie That Binds"	Brent Cobb	And Now, Let's Turn to Page...	Background Vocals
2022	"Sapling (feat Anderson East)"	Foy Vance	Sapling (feat Anderson East)	Vocals
2022	"Unravel"	Lissie	Carving Canyons	Writer
2021	"Can't Tell The Difference (feat Anderson East and John Paul White)"	Zachary Williams, Anderson East, John Paul White	Dirty Camaro	Vocals
2021	"Looking the Other Way"	Trent Dabbs	Looking the Other Way - Single	Writer, Producer
2021	"Retrospect"	Trent Dabbs	Retrospect - Single	Writer
2021	"Easy Going"	Trent Dabbs, Ashley Monroe	Easy Going - Single	Writer
2021	"Maybe We Never Die"	Anderson East	Maybe We Never Die	Writer/Producer/Acoustic Guitar/Electric Guitar/Programming/Vocals
2021	"Lights On"	Anderson East	Maybe We Never Die	Writer/Engineer/Producer/Electric Guitar/Vocals/Background Vocals
2021	"Madelyn"	Anderson East	Maybe We Never Die	Writer/Engineer/Producer/Electric Guitar/Percussion/Vocals
2021	"Drugs"	Anderson East	Maybe We Never Die	Writer/Producer/Electric Guitar/Programming/Vocals/Background Vocals
2021	"I Hate You"	Anderson East	Maybe We Never Die	Writer/Producer/Acoustic Guitar/Electric Guitar/Percussion/Programming/Vocals
2021	"Hood of My Car"	Anderson East	Maybe We Never Die	Writer/Producer/12-String Guitar/Acoustic Guitar/Electric Guitar/Programming/Vocals
2021	"Falling"	Anderson East	Maybe We Never Die	Writer/Engineer/Producer/Programming/Vocals
2021	"Jet Black Pontiac"	Anderson East	Maybe We Never Die	Writer/Engineer/Producer/Bass/Programming/Vocals
2021	"Like Nothing Ever Happened"	Anderson East	Maybe We Never Die	Writer/Engineer/Producer/Vocals
2021	"If You Really Love Me"	Anderson East	Maybe We Never Die	Writer/Producer/Electric Guitar/Vocals
2021	"Just You & I"	Anderson East	Maybe We Never Die	Writer/Producer/Electric Guitar/Synth/Vocals/Wurlitzer
2021	"Interstellar Outer Space"	Anderson East	Maybe We Never Die	Writer/Producer/Programming/Vocals
2021	"Satisfy Me"	MJ Dardar	Rust	Writer
2021	"Count on Me (Alt Version)"	The Lone Bellow	Half Moon Light (Deluxe Edition)	Writer
2020	"Count on Me"	The Lone Bellow	Half Moon Light	Writer
2020	"I Ain't No Zebra I'm a Bumblebee"	Anderson East	I Ain't No Zebra I'm a Bumblebee (from "At Home With the Kids")	Mixer/Producer/Vocals
2019	"Somebody Pick Up My Pieces" - Live	Anderson East	Alive in Tennessee	Producer/Guitar/Vocals
2019	"Surrender - Live"	Anderson East	Alive in Tennessee	Writer/Producer/Guitar/Vocals
2019	"Satisfy Me - Live"	Anderson East	Alive in Tennessee	Writer/Producer/Guitar/Vocals
2019	"If You Keep Leaving Me - Live"	Anderson East	Alive in Tennessee	Writer/Producer/Guitar/Vocals
2019	"King for a Day - Live"	Anderson East	Alive in Tennessee	Writer/Producer/Guitar/Vocals
2019	"Devil In Me - Live"	Anderson East	Alive in Tennessee	Writer/Producer/Guitar/Vocals
2019	"Hold On, I'm Coming - Live'"	Anderson East	Alive in Tennessee	Producer/Guitar/Vocals
2019	"Interlude 1 - Live"	Anderson East	Alive in Tennessee	Writer/Producer/Guitar/Vocals
2019	"What a Woman Wants to Hear - Live"	Anderson East	Alive in Tennessee	Writer/Producer/Guitar/Vocals
2019	"Lying in Her Arms - Live"	Anderson East	Alive in Tennessee	Writer/Producer/Guitar/Vocals
2019	"Without You - Live"	Anderson East	Alive in Tennessee	Writer/Producer/Guitar/Vocals
2019	"Sorry You're Sick - Live"	Anderson East	Alive in Tennessee	Producer/Guitar/Vocals
2019	"Girlfriend - Live"	Anderson East	Alive in Tennessee	Writer/Producer/Guitar/Vocals
2019	"All on My Mind - Live"	Anderson East	Alive in Tennessee	Writer/Producer/Guitar/Vocals
2019	"Interlude 2 - Live"	Anderson East	Alive in Tennessee	Writer/Producer/Guitar/Vocals
2019	"House Is a Building - Live"	Anderson East	Alive in Tennessee	Writer/Producer/Guitar/Vocals
2019	"Cabinet Door - Live"	Anderson East	Alive in Tennessee	Writer/Producer/Guitar/Vocals
2019	"This Too Shall Last - Live"	Anderson East	Alive in Tennessee	Writer/Producer/Guitar/Vocals
2019	"Let You Go (feat Anderson East)"	Beoga	Let You Go (feat Anderson East	Vocals
2019	"Don't Go Pulling on Santa's Claus' Beard"	The Oak Ridge Boys	Down Home Christmas	Writer
2019	"If You Keep Leaving Me"	Penn Counterparts	Evergreen	Writer
2018	"This Heaven"	Ashley Monroe	Sparrow	Writer
2018	"Other Side of Love (From the Motion Picture "Second Act)"	Anderson East	Other Side of Love (From the Motion Picture "Second Act)	Vocals
2018	"This Too Shall Last (Stripped)"	Anderson East	This Too Shall Last (Stripped) - Single	Writer/Electric Guitar/Lead Vocals
2018	"King For A Day"	Anderson East	Encore	Writer/Lead Vocals
2018	"This Too Shall Last"	Anderson East	Encore	Writer/Electric Guitar/Lead Vocals
2018	"House Is A Building"	Anderson East	Encore	Writer/Electric Guitar/Lead Vocals
2018	"Sorry You're Sick"	Anderson East	Encore	Electric Guitar/Hand Clap/Lead Vocals
2018	"If You Keep Leaving Me"	Anderson East	Encore	Writer/Lead Vocals
2018	"Girlfriend"	Anderson East	Encore	Writer/Featured Vocals
2018	"Surrender"	Anderson East	Encore	Writer/Electric Guitar/Featured Vocals
2018	"All On My Mind"	Anderson East	Encore	Writer/Lead Vocals
2018	"Without You"	Anderson East	Encore	Writer/Electric Guitar/Lead Vocals
2018	"Somebody Pick Up My Pieces"	Anderson East	Encore	Acoustic Guitar/Electric Guitar/Slide Guitar/Lead Vocals
2018	"Cabinet Door"	Anderson East	Encore	Writer/Lead Vocals
2018	"All On My Mind" - Recorded at Sound Stage Nashville	Anderson East	Spotify Singles	Writer/Vocals
2018	"Always Be My Baby" - Recorded at Sound Stage Nashville	Anderson East	Spotify Singles	Vocals
2017	"What Would It Take"	Anderson East	Fifty Shades Darker (Original Motion Picture Soundtrack)	Composer/Lyricist
2017	"All On My Mind - Acoustic"	Anderson East	All on My Mind (Acoustic)	Writer/Vocals
2017	"Josephine"	Anderson East	Cover Stories: Brandi Carlile Celebrates 10 Years of the Story (An Album to Benefit War Child	Producer/Guitar
2017	"Devil in Me - Live"	Karin Tingne	Live At Ystad Teater	Writer
2017	"Pray All The Way Home"	Austin Snell	Pray All the Way Home (Stripped)	Writer
2017	"Pray All The Way Home - Stripped"	Austin Snell	Pray All the Way Home (Stripped)	Writer
2016	"Learning"	Anderson East, Southern Family	Learning	Writer/Vocals
2015	"Only You"	Anderson East	Delilah	Writer/Lead Vocals
2015	"Satisfy Me"	Anderson East	Delilah	Writer/Electric Guitar/Vocals
2015	"Find 'Em, Fool 'Em and Forget 'Em"	Anderson East	Delilah	Lead Vocals
2015	"Devil in Me"	Anderson East	Delilah	Writer/Acoustic Guitar/Mellotron/Vocals
2015	"All I'll Ever Need"	Anderson East	Delilah	Writer/Mellotron/Lead Vocals
2015	"Quit You"	Anderson East	Delilah	Writer/Vocals
2015	"What a Woman Wants to Hear"	Anderson East	Delilah	Writer/Acoustic Guitar/Electric Guitar/Mellotron/Vocals
2015	"Lonely"	Anderson East	Delilah	Writer/Vocals
2015	"Keep the Fire Burning"	Anderson East	Delilah	Writer/Electric Guitar/Mandolin/Lead Vocals
2015	"Lyng in Her Arms"	Anderson East	Delilah	Writer/Acoustic Guitar/Electric Guitar/Mellotron/Vocals/Wurlitzer
2015	"Satisfy Me - Live from Fame"	Anderson East	The Music Shoals Sessions - Live from Fame	Writer/Lead Vocals
2015	"Find 'EM, Fool 'Em and Forget 'Em - Live from Fame"	Anderson East	The Music Shoals Sessions - Live from Fame	Lead Vocals
2015	"Only You - Live from Fame"	Anderson East	The Music Shoals Sessions - Live from Fame	Writer/Lead Vocals
2015	"Devil In Me - Live from Fame"	Anderson East	The Music Shoals Sessions - Live from Fame	Writer/Lead Vocals
2015	"Lonely - Live from Fame"	Anderson East	The Music Shoals Sessions - Live from Fame	Writer/Lead Vocals

== Awards and nominations ==
Year	Association	Category	Nominated work	Result
2018	Americana Music Honors & Awards	Emerging Artist of the Year	Anderson East	Nominated
2019	Grammy Awards	Best American Roots Performance	"All On My Mind"	Nominated
