= Low Country Sound =

- Parent company: Warner Music Group
- Founded: 2015
- Founder: Dave Cobb
- Distributor(s): 300 Elektra Entertainment (United States); Warner Music Group (International)
- Genre: Country; Outlaw country; Alt Country; Americana; Southern rock; Rock & Roll; Blues rock
- Country of origin: United States
- Location: Nashville, Tennessee
- Official website: lowcountrysound.com

Low Country Sound is a record label imprint of Elektra Records based in Nashville, Tennessee. It was founded in 2015 by music producer Dave Cobb who also runs it. Among the artists currently signed to Low Country Sound, some notable acts are Anderson East, Brent Cobb and Rival Sons.

== History ==
Low Country Sound was created in 2015 by Cobb. Since early 2016, the label is based in Nashville's RCA Studio A, a historically significant studio founded by Chet Atkins, central to the creation of the Nashville sound movement, and adjacent to RCA Studio B. It is located on the famed Music Row. Both buildings have a rich musical history and are the location of recording for numerous stars including Waylon Jennings, Elvis Presley, Dolly Parton, Chris Stapleton, The Beach Boys, Ben Folds, Nancy Sinatra and Charley Pride.

In June 2016, the imprint label successfully negotiated a co-publishing agreement with its main parent company Warner/Chappell Nash and with a team of singer-songwriters consisting of Adam Hood, Aaron Raitiere and Charlie Pate.

== Releases ==
The imprint label made its debut release with Anderson East’s 2015 major label debut album, Delilah.

In 2016, Low Country Sound released a collaborative album called Southern Family featuring a multitude of notable country artists such as Jason Isbell, Jamey Johnson, Shooter Jennings and Miranda Lambert.

In 2016, Low Country Sound released Brent Cobb's major label debut album Shine on Rainy Day. The album received a 2018 Grammy award nomination for "Best Americana Album".

In February 2018 it was announced the rock band Rival Sons were officially signed and will be releasing their next album on the imprint label.

In 2018, it was announced Shooter Jennings will release his next album, Shooter on Low Country Sound.

== Creative identity ==
Low Country Sound is predominantly focused on releasing music originating or inspired from the Southern United States region. It focuses on elements of Country, Outlaw, Americana and Southern rock genres, yet also incorporates acts in the Rock and roll and Blues rock genres.

Cobb has said he focuses on the performer's voice, aiming for an end product which sounds natural and is not forced. He also is known to not have a preference over analogue recordings versus digital, instead believing the spontaneous nature of creativity as well as the inspiration derived from new discovery, predominantly drives the organic quality of a song.

== Signed artists ==
Since its inception, Low Country Sound has signed or released works by artists such as Anderson East, Brent Cobb, and Savannah Conley. Other artists include Rival Sons, Shooter Jennings, and Brandi Carlile.
