= Jay Buchanan =

American singer (born 1975)

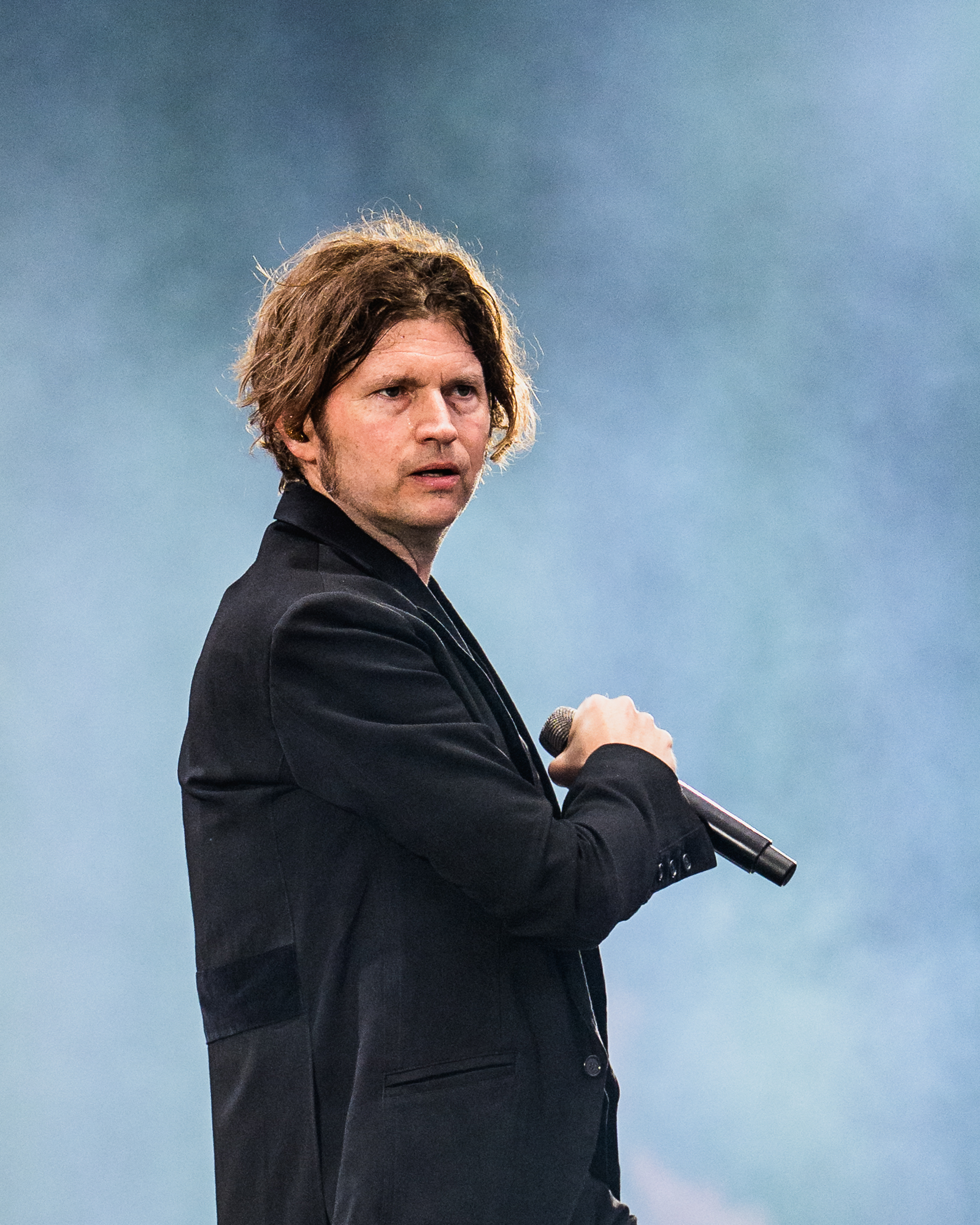
- Buchanan in 2026

Background information
- Born: July 6, 1975 (age 50); San Bernardino, California, U.S.
- Genres: Rock; Americana; country; rock and roll; electric blues
- Occupations: Singer; songwriter; actor
- Years active: 2005–present
- Website: weaponsofbeauty.com

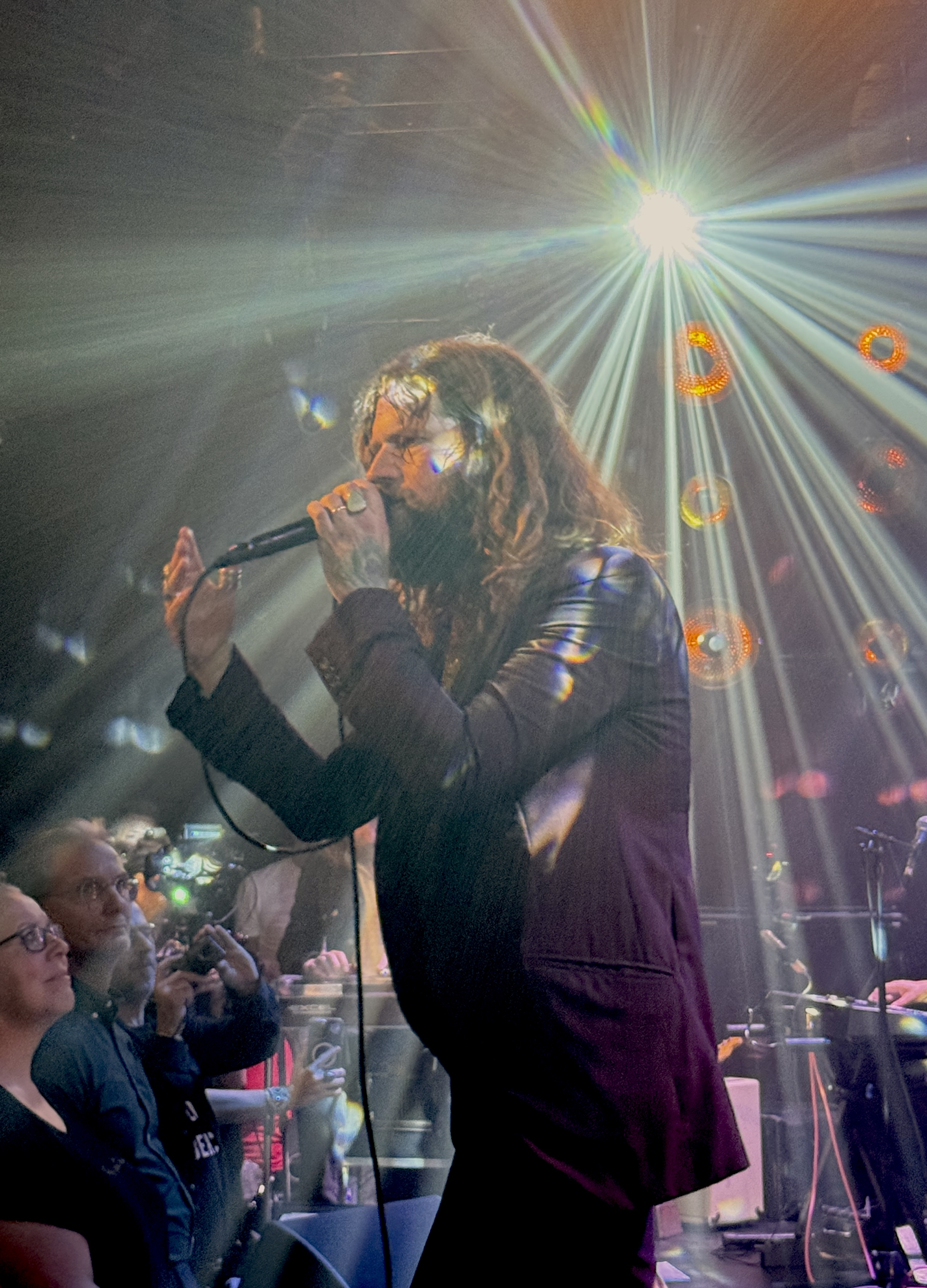
Buchanan in Paris, 2025

Jay Bartholomew Buchanan (born July 6, 1975) is an American singer, songwriter, and musician best known as the lead vocalist of the rock band Rival Sons. Active since the mid-2000s, he has also released solo material, collaborated with a wide range of artists, and contributed to film soundtracks. Buchanan's voice—known for its wide range, dynamic power, and blues-influenced phrasing—has earned him critical recognition as one of the most distinctive modern rock vocalists.

== Early life ==
Buchanan was born in San Bernardino, California, and spent his childhood between Fontana and the rural mountain community of Wrightwood. Growing up in the High Desert region, he developed an early connection to nature and the outdoors, alongside an interest in music and songwriting. He began performing publicly as a teenager and later formed several local bands before pursuing a professional music career.

== Early musical projects ==
Before joining Rival Sons, Buchanan released solo material and performed under his own name, blending folk, Americana, blues, and acoustic songwriting. His early solo work helped establish the emotive vocal style and lyrical sensibility that would define his later career.

== Rival Sons ==
Rival Sons formed in Long Beach, California, in 2008. Buchanan joined the group shortly after its formation, becoming the primary vocalist and lyricist. The band quickly gained attention for its mix of blues rock, hard rock, and soul-influenced songwriting. Rival Sons released their debut album Before the Fire in 2009, followed by Pressure & Time (2011), which brought wider international recognition and touring opportunities.

== Commercial and critical success ==
Throughout the 2010s and 2020s, Rival Sons released several acclaimed albums, including Head Down (2012), Great Western Valkyrie (2014), Hollow Bones (2016), Feral Roots (2019), and the companion albums Darkfighter and Lightbringer (2023). Feral Roots received two nominations at the 62nd Annual Grammy Awards, including Best Rock Album and Best Rock Performance for the song "Too Bad."

The band toured extensively in North America, Europe, and beyond, performing at major festivals and supporting artists such as Black Sabbath, Deep Purple, and Guns N' Roses.

== Collaborations and other work ==
Outside Rival Sons, Buchanan has collaborated with a wide range of artists across genres, including Jason Isbell, Massive Attack, Kaleo, The Bee Gees' Barry Gibb, The Blind Boys of Alabama, The Bloody Beetroots, and Brandi Carlile.

He has worked frequently with producer Dave Cobb, contributing songs to film projects and joint writing sessions. Buchanan also appears in the feature film Springsteen: Deliver Me From Nowhere, directed by Scott Cooper, which explores the making of Bruce Springsteen's Nebraska. Contributing three songs to the soundtrack: "Lucille" and John Lee Hooker's "Boom Boom"— and Screamin' Jay Hawkins' "I Put a Spell on You."

== Solo career ==
Buchanan announced his debut solo album, Weapons of Beauty, for release on February 6, 2026, via Thirty Tigers.

Written largely in isolation in the Mojave Desert, the album marks a shift toward more introspective songwriting. Buchanan lived and worked in a small underground bunker while writing the material, often composing by firelight. The album was recorded in Savannah, Georgia, with longtime collaborator Dave Cobb and a small ensemble of Nashville musicians.

Weapons of Beauty explores themes of love, the American landscape, solitude, and personal renewal. Tracks such as "Caroline" draw on narrative storytelling and reflect Buchanan's interest in Americana and roots-influenced songwriting. The album also includes a reinterpretation of Leonard Cohen's "Dance Me to the End of Love".

== Musical style and influences ==
Buchanan's vocal style incorporates elements of soul, blues, gospel, folk, and classic rock. Critics frequently note his dynamic range, expressive delivery, and ability to move between delicate phrasing and high-intensity vocal performances

His influences include traditional American music, classic soul vocalists, and singer-songwriters. Lyrically, he often draws from themes of love, spirituality, nature, and personal introspection.

== Discography ==
=== Solo ===
- Weapons of Beauty (2026)

=== With Rival Sons ===
- Before the Fire (2009)
- Pressure & Time (2011)
- Head Down (2012)
- Great Western Valkyrie (2014)
- Hollow Bones (2016)
- Feral Roots (2019)
- Darkfighter (2023)
- Lightbringer (2023)

=== Collaborations ===
- The Bloody Beetroots feat. Jay Buchanan – "Nothing but Love" (2018)
- Brandi Carlile & Jay Buchanan – "Road to Glory" (2019)
- Barry Gibb feat. Jay Buchanan – "To Love Somebody" (2022)
- Barry Gibb feat. Jay Buchanan & Miranda Lambert – "Jive Talkin'" (2022)
- Blind Boys of Alabama & Jay Buchanan – "I Heard the Bells on Christmas Day" (2024)
- Corina Franssen - "Us Against the World"
- Kaleo - "Surface Sounds"
- Jason Isbell - Reunions ("What've I Done to Help" (feat. David Crosby) & "Only Children")
- Anderson East - "Lights On"
- Deliver Me from Nowhere soundtrack (October 2025):
  - Jay Buchanan & Jeremy Allen White - "Lucille"
  - Jay Buchanan & Jeremy Allen White - "Boom Boom"
  - Jay Buchanan, Jake Kiszka, Sam F. Kiszka, Aksel Coe & Bobby Emmett - "I Put a Spell on You"

=== Writing credits ===
- Caleb Johnson and the Rambling Saints - Solid Gold (2019)
- Sammy Hagar - Not Going Down (2013)

=== Production credits ===
- Sinners Congregation - For Your Pleasure
- Co-production: DARKFIGHTER & LIGHTBRINGER (Rival Sons)

== Film and media ==
Buchanan plays the frontman of band playing The Stone Pony "Cats On A Smooth Surface" in Springsteen: Deliver Me From Nowhere (Scott Cooper)

Buchanan's music has been featured in television, film, and commercial placements including The "Heroes Wanted" commercial, including a custom song "Bridge to Glory" produced by Grammy award winner Dave Cobb, with vocals by Grammy-nominated artist Brandi Carlile and Jay Buchanan, lead singer of the Rival Sons.
