= Wagenius =

Wagenius is a surname. Notable people with the surname include:

- Erika Wagenius (born 1967), Swedish singer, performer, and songwriter
- Hanna Wagenius (born 1988), Swedish blogger and politician
- Jean Wagenius (born 1941), American politician
