= Black Robot =

- Origin: Los Angeles, California, US
- Genres: Hard rock
- Years active: 2008–present
- Labels: Formosa Records, Rocket Science Ventures
- Members: Jonathan Brightman (JB), Andy Andersson, Staffan Österlind, Possum Hill, Jeremy Aric Past members: Huck Johns
- Website: http://www.blackrobotmusic.com

Black Robot is a California-based hard rock band formed in 2008 by bassist Jonathan Brightman (JB). Their debut album was released June 8, 2010 on Formosa Records/Rocket Science Ventures Brightman is a founding member of the Grammy nominated band Buckcherry, co-writing and performing on their self-titled debut album, as well as their follow up Time Bomb.

Brightman recruited Detroit-bred front man Huck Johns on vocals and Black Robot recorded their debut in 2008 with Grammy winning producer Dave Cobb (Chris Stapleton, Shooter Jennings, Rival Sons). Former Buckcherry alumni Devon Glenn & Yogi Lonich and legendary keyboard session player Fred Mandel (Queen, Alice Cooper, Pink Floyd) make guest appearances on the album. In 2009, guitarists Andy Andersson & Staffan Österlind and former Hot Sauce Johnson / Rumblefish / Earshot drummer Possum Hill were added to the line-up. Johns, Brightman and Cobb had already written and recorded the record. The band was described as a "new powerhouse" and "good ol’ rock ‘n’ roll influenced by acts like Led Zeppelin, AC/DC, Black Crowes and the Rolling Stones"

The band released their first music video for the JJ Cale classic "Cocaine" on May 5, 2010, debuting it exclusively on top rated gaming website IGN.com. The video features a comical cameo appearance by former The Kids in the Hall and NewsRadio star Dave Foley and was filmed at the legendary burlesque club Jumbo’s Clown Room. A commercial for the debut album featuring outtakes from the video aired exclusively during episodes of VH-1 Classic's That Metal Show.

In December 2010 the band's self-titled debut album was picked by Apple iTunes as one of the top 15 rock releases for the year alongside notable artists including Tom Petty, Slash, Elvis Costello and Deftones. Additionally, Classic Rock Magazine ranked their song "Baddass" as the #5 Song of the Year and chose it as the opening track of their Best of 2010 CD.

Johns decided to move on, it was announced in December 2011 that Los Angeles singer Jeremy Aric had joined the band. Soon after, they re-entered a Nashville, TN studio with producer Dave Cobb to record their second album titled Woman.
