= Sedona (song) =

Single by Houndmouth

from the album Little Neon Limelight
- Released: 2015
- Recorded: 2014
- Genre: Indie rock
- Length: 3:59
- Label: Rough Trade
- Songwriter(s): Houndmouth

Houndmouth singles chronology
"Sedona" (2015)	"Say It" (2015)

"Sedona" is the first single on Houndmouth's second studio album Little Neon Limelight.

== Chart positions ==
=== Weekly charts ===
Chart (2015)	Peak position
Canada Rock (Billboard)	29
US Hot Rock & Alternative Songs (Billboard)	31
US Rock & Alternative Airplay (Billboard)	20
US Alternative Airplay (Billboard)	13
US Adult Alternative Songs (Billboard)	1

=== Year-end charts ===
Chart (2015)	Position
US Hot Rock Songs (Billboard)	84

== Certifications ==
Region	Certification	Certified units/sales
Canada (Music Canada)	2× Platinum	160,000^{‡}
New Zealand (RMNZ)	Gold	15,000^{‡}
United States (RIAA)	Platinum	1,000,000^{‡}
^{‡} Sales+streaming figures based on certification alone.
