= Little Neon Limelight =

Studio album by Houndmouth
- Released: March 17, 2015
- Studio: Low Country Sound (Nashville, Tennessee)
- Length: 39:04
- Label: Rough Trade
- Producer: Dave Cobb

Houndmouth chronology
From the Hills Below the City (2013)	Little Neon Limelight (2015)	Golden Age (2018)

Little Neon Limelight is the second studio album by American alternative blues band Houndmouth. It was released on March 17, 2015 via Rough Trade Records. Recording sessions took place at Low Country Sound Studios in Nashville, TN.

== Background and release ==
Little Neon Limelight was announced in a press release by Rough Trade Records on January 20, 2015 for release on March 17, 2015. The album was recorded at the Low Country Sound Studios in Nashville, Tennessee with Dave Cobb handling production.

Professional ratings
Aggregate scores
Source	Rating
Metacritic	74/100
Review scores
Source	Rating
AllMusic	3/5 stars
Austin Chronicle	3.5/5 stars
musicOMH	3/5 stars
Record Collector	3/5 stars
The Guardian	4/5 stars
The Line of Best Fit	8/10

== Track listing ==
All tracks are written by Katie Toupin, Matt Myers, Shane Cody and Zak Appleby.

No.	Title	Length
1.	"Sedona"	3:59
2.	"Otis"	3:11
3.	"15 Years"	3:07
4.	"For No One"	3:49
5.	"Black Gold"	3:40
6.	"Honey Slider"	3:36
7.	"My Cousin Greg"	3:56
8.	"Gasoline"	2:51
9.	"By God"	3:15
10.	"Say It"	3:22
11.	"Darlin'"	4:18
Total length:		39:04

== Charts ==
Chart (2015)	Peak position
US Billboard 200	118
US Top Rock Albums (Billboard)	15
US Folk Albums (Billboard)	8
US Independent Albums (Billboard)	8
US Heatseekers Albums (Billboard)	1
US Top Tastemaker Albums (Billboard)	25
