= Tuff (band) =

American glam metal band

- Origin: Phoenix, Arizona, United States
- Genres: Glam metal, hard rock, heavy metal
- Years active: 1985–present
- Labels: Atlantic, I.R.S./Grand Slamm Records, Mausoleum Records
- Members: Todd "Chase" Chaisson; Stevie Rachelle; Michael Lean; Billy Morris
- Past members: Jorge DeSaint; Gary Huckaby; Tod "T" Burr; Terry Fox; Jim Gillette; Danny Wilder; Jimi Lord Winalis; Jamie Fonte; Adam Hamilton; Benny Bruce; Brian Saunders; Tony Eckholm; Darrell Roberts; Michael Thomas; John Corabi; Keri Kelli; Staffan Österlind
- Website: Tuffcds.com

Tuff is an American glam metal band formed in 1985 in Phoenix, Arizona by guitarist Jorge Manos (DeSaint) and bassist Todd Chaisson (Chase). The initial incarnation of Tuff was prior to taking on its "Glam" image, and the music was significantly "heavier". This little documented line-up played in the local Phoenix market for roughly a year, at such clubs as Rockers and Bootlegger, opening for various National Acts, including Flotsam and Jetsam.

In 1986, drummer Gary Huckaby replaced Louthan. Cordet left to work with another Phoenix area band, and eventually, Michael Angelo Batio in the Los Angeles–based band, Michael Angelo. A second guitarist David Janssen also left the band to attend the Musicians Institute. After drummer Gary Huckaby left the group in 1986 to work with another local project, the band enlisted drummer Michael Lean and vocalist Terry Fox, who left the band shortly afterwards to pursue an ice skating career. With replacement vocalist Jim Gillette, the band recorded a four-track EP entitled Knock Yourself Out (1986). However, Gillette soon departed to form Nitro and was replaced by Stevie Rachelle.

== History ==
The band with its classic line-up consisted of Stevie Rachelle on vocals, Jorge DeSaint on guitars, Todd Chase on bass and drummer Michael "Lean" Raimondo. The band played all over the West Coast and eventually was doing cross-country tours and headlining clubs.

Tuff was first signed in 1990 by Atlantic Records and released their debut album What Comes Around Goes Around in May 1991, which included the band's successful power ballad "I Hate Kissing You Goodbye", co-written with Todd Meagher. The video reached No. 3 on Dial MTV behind Guns N' Roses and Metallica. Tuff were dropped from Atlantic Records in the year 1992.

The band was then picked up by IRS Grand Slamm Records in early 1993. The label folded in less than a year with the end of the mother label, IRS Records, which distributed Grand Slamm, and Tuff was without a label again. After struggling with record labels for years, Stevie Rachelle decided to form his own label for the band and in early 1994, Rachelle officially started RLS Records. The initials had a dual meaning. The first was "Record Labels Suck" and the second was "Rachelle's Lyrics & Songs".

In 1994, Tuff independently released Fist First, which was eventually reissued by another major label BMG as Religious Fix, in 1995 with the addition of two bonus tracks.

Tuff officially signed with a record label in early 1995 when BMG/Mausoleum/MMS records picked up the RLS Fist First release after it sold upwards of 10,000 copies. BMG re-issued it as Religious Fix in June 1995 with two bonus tracks. The additional tracks were produced by Randy Cantor.

The offshoot of RLS Records, Cheezee Records, was formed in 1996 to be the home for the singer's side project, Cheeseheads with Attitude.

In 2001, Tuff released the compilation CD, The History of Tuff which included the song 'American Hair Band', a parody of Kid Rock's 'American Bad Ass' (both of which incorporate the instrumentals of Metallica's 'Sad but True'). 'American Hair Band' made references to numerous similar bands of the era, as well as criticizing grunge and alternative rock.

Tuff re-released What Comes Around Goes Around Again in 2012, which featured four re-recorded songs from What Comes Around Goes Around plus new tracks.

== Band members ==
=== Active members ===
- Todd Chase – bass guitar (1985–1991, 2008–present)
- Michael Lean – drums (1985–1993, 2024–present)
- Stevie Rachelle – vocals, acoustic guitar (1987–1995, 2000–present)
- Billy Morris – guitar (2004, 2012–present)

=== Former members ===
- Jorge DeSaint – guitar (1985–1995)
- Terry Fox – vocals (1985)
- Jim Gillette – vocals (1986–1987)
- Danny Wilder – bass guitar (1992–1993, died 2005)
- Jamie Fonte – bass guitar (1994–1995)
- Adam Hamilton – drums (1995)
- Brian Saunders – bass guitar (2000–2001)
- Tony Eckholm – drums (2000–2001)
- Darrell Roberts – guitar (2000–2001)
- Michael Thomas – guitar (2001–2002)
- John Corabi – guitar (2001)
- Jack Aurora – guitar (2003–2012)
- Keri Kelli – guitar (2005)
- Paul Jaeger – bass guitar (2006–2008, died 2023)
- Mike Trash – guitar (2006)
- Trent Anderson – drums (2011–2014)
- Staffan Österlind – guitar (2012–2013)
- Michael Scott Nelson – drums (2014)
- Tod "T" Burr' – drums (2001–2012, 2015–2024)

=== Touring members ===
- Benny Bruce – keyboards (1988–1990)
- Jimi Lord Winalis – drums (1993–1995)
- Nick Mason – drums (2012, 2015)
- Boris "BC" Chudzinski – guitar (2013)
- Howie Simon – guitar (2016–2017, 2024–present)
- Dougie "Lixx" Manross – guitar (2023–present)

== Discography ==
=== Studio albums ===
- What Comes Around Goes Around (1991)
- Fist First (1994)
- Religious Fix (1995)

=== Live albums ===
- Decade of Disrespect 85–95 (1996)
- Live in the U.K. (2003)

=== Compilation albums ===
- Regurgitation (1997)
- History of Tuff (2001)
- What Comes Around Goes Around... Again! (2012)
- Decadation (2015) *Vinyl Only
- The Glam Years 1985–1989 (2015)
- American Hair Metal (Coming in 2026) *Vinyl, CD, Digital

=== Extended plays ===
- Knock Yourself Out (1986)
- Sound City Demos (1988)
- Sunset Sound Demos (1989)

=== Guest appearances ===
- Metal Edge: The Best of L.A. - Vol. 1 by Various Artists (1994) - "Another Man's Gun" (CMC International)
- Metal Sludge: Hey That's What I Call Sludge - Vol. 1 by Various Artists (2003) – "Dear Jani Lane"

=== Stevie Rachelle ===
==== Studio albums ====
- Who the Hell Am I? (1998)
- Since Sixty-Six (2000)
- Best sTuff (2019)
- Covers (2024)

==== with CWA ====
- Straight Outta Wisconsin (1996)
- Cheeseheads for Life (1997)
- Say Cheese (1998)
- The Greatest Slices of... (2003)
- Green N' Gold Hits (2011)
- "A-Rod Remix of Packer Fans" (2011) *Single

==== with Shameless ====
- Backstreet Anthems (1999)
- Queen 4 a Day (2000)
- Splashed (2002)
- Super Hardcore Show Live (2003)
- Famous 4 Madness (2007)
- Dial $ for Sex (2011)
- Beautiful Disaster (2013)
- The Filthy 7 (2017)
- So Good You Should (2022)

==== with Tales from the Porn ====
- H.M.M.V. (2017)

==== Guest appearances ====
- Appetite for Reconstruction: A Tribute to Gn'R (1999) – vocals on "You're Crazy"
- Covered like a Hurricane: A Tribute to Scorpions (2000) – vocals on "Blackout"
- Leppardmania: A Tribute to Def Leppard (2000) – vocals on "Too Late for Love"
- Shout at the Remix: A Tribute to Mötley Crüe (2000) – vocals on "Red Hot"
- Name Your Poison: A Tribute to Poison (2001) – vocals on "Look What the Cat Dragged In"
- Fire Woman / A Tribute to The Cult (2001) – vocals on "Outlaw"
- Livin' On a Prayer: A Tribute to Bon Jovi (2001) – vocals on "In & Out of Love"
- Bulletproof Fever: A Tribute to Ted Nugent (2001) – vocals on "Wango Tango", guitars by Jake E. Lee
- Album Networks Rock Tune Up (2001) – "American Hair Band", guitars by Darrell Roberts
- A Tribute to Journey (2002) – vocals on "Lights"
- A Tribute to Styx (2002) – vocals on "Babe"
- A Rock Tribute to Guns N' Roses (2002) – vocals on "You're Crazy", guitars by Tracii Guns & Gilby Clarke
- Mullet Years – Rocker (Universal/Canada 2003) – "American Hair Band"
- We Wish You a Hairy Christmas (Koch Records 2003) – "Jingle Bell Rock" (lead vocal), guitars by Nick Nolan
- Crue Believers – A Rock Tribute to Motley Crue (2008) – "Red Hot" (lead vocal) feat: Tracii Guns *CD
- Kid Rock Tribute – Title tba (2009) – "American Bad Ass" & "Bawitdaba" (lead vocal)
- 80s Hair Metal Goes Classic (Compilation CD) (2009) – "Lights" (Journey cover) (lead vocal)
- Rockstar Superstar Project – Serenity (2010) – "Get Out of My Way" (lead vocal), guitars by George Lynch
- Whole Lotta Love: An All-Star Salute to Fat Chicks (2011) – "Thunder Thighs" (lead vocal)
- The Cigar Chronicles Vol 1 (2012) – "I Can't Dance" (lead vocal)
- Crue Believers – A Rock Tribute to Motley Crue (2022) – "Red Hot" (lead vocal) feat: Tracii Guns *Vinyl

== Home videos VHS/DVD ==
- What Comes Around Goes Around: The Videos (VHS 1991 / DVD 2003)
- Religious Fix the Videos (VHS 1995 / DVD 2003)
- Decade of Distant Memories (VHS 1996 / DVD 2003)
- Rock N' Rarities the Videos (DVD 2003)

== TV, film and documentaries ==
- The Decline of Western Civilization Part II: The Metal Years (1988) Documentary Film (New Line Cinema)
- Wayne's World 2 (1993) (Paramount Pictures)
- The Stoned Age (1994) (Trimark Pictures)
- VH-1 Where Are They Now? Hair Bands II (1999) (Viacom/Vh1)
- Top 40 Metal Songs (2006) (Viacom/Vh1)
- Worst Metal Videos (200?) (Viacom/Vh1)
- Hollywood Rocks DVD – Ultimate Documentary (2008)
- Nöthin' But a Good Time: The Uncensored Story of '80s Hair Metal (2024) (Paramount+)
- Bill Gazzarri - Documentary (2025 in Production)

== Appearances in published books ==
- Hollywood Rocks – Ultimate Guide (2003), ISBN 978-0963619358
- American Hair Metal, Steven Blush (2006), ISBN 978-1932595185
- Fuck You – Rock n' Roll Portraits, Neil Zlozower (2008), ISBN 978-0811866101
- The Decade That Rocked 1980–1990, Mark "Weiss Guy" Weiss (2020)
- Nöthin’ But a Good Time: The Uncensored History of the ’80s Hard Rock Explosion, Tom Beaujour & Richard Bienstock (2021)
