= Darkfighter =

Studio album by Rival Sons
- Released: June 2, 2023
- Length: 39:35
- Label: Atlantic
- Producer: Dave Cobb

Rival Sons chronology
Feral Roots (2019)	Darkfighter (2023)	Lightbringer (2023)

Singles from Darkfighter
- 1. "Nobody Wants to Die" Released: October 14, 2022; 2. "Bird in the Hand" Released: March 10, 2023

Darkfighter is the seventh studio album by American band Rival Sons, released on June 2, 2023, through Atlantic Records. It was produced by Dave Cobb and preceded by the singles "Nobody Wants to Die" and "Bird in the Hand". It was originally scheduled for release on March 10 before being delayed. The band toured North America in support of the album from May to June 2023. The album will be followed by Lightbringer, set for release on October 20, 2023.

== Background ==
Vocalist Jay Buchanan stated the album "represents the cultural mitosis of isolation, the pandemic, and the national fabric of the U.S. getting looser and looser".

== Critical reception ==
Professional ratings
Review scores
Source	Rating
Classic Rock	4/5 stars
Metal Injection	7.5/10

Dave Everley of Classic Rock called it "not so much the sound of a reinvention as that of a band recalibrated and revitalised", as Rival Sons "sound simultaneously sharper, deeper and more intense". Everley remarked that it has a "fat-free eight tracks" and is "a great album" on which the band "have emerged stronger than ever". Chad Bowar of Metal Injection wrote that Rival Sons have "balanced focused, straightforward songs with longer, more complex compositions" throughout their career, which carries over to Darkfighter, which also contains "numerous radio-ready bangers" like "Bird in the Hand". Bowar concluded that Darkfighter "mostly lives up to the hype" and several songs "should become staples of their set list".

== Track listing ==
Darkfighter track listing
No.	Title	Length
1.	"Mirrors"	5:01
2.	"Nobody Wants to Die"	3:42
3.	"Bird in the Hand"	4:28
4.	"Bright Light"	4:33
5.	"Rapture"	4:24
6.	"Guillotine"	5:05
7.	"Horses Breath"	6:04
8.	"Darkside"	6:18
Total length:		39:35

== Charts ==
Chart performance for Darkfighter
Chart (2023)	Peak position
Austrian Albums (Ö3 Austria)	29
Belgian Albums (Ultratop Flanders)	69
Belgian Albums (Ultratop Wallonia)	23
Finnish Albums (Suomen virallinen lista)	37
French Albums (SNEP)	59
German Albums (Offizielle Top 100)	15
Norwegian Albums (VG-lista)	23
Scottish Albums (Official Charts)	7
Swiss Albums (Schweizer Hitparade)	10
UK Albums (Official Charts)	30
UK Rock & Metal Albums (Official Charts)	2
US Heatseekers Albums (Billboard)	9
US Top Album Sales (Billboard)	36
