= Staffan Österlind =

Swedish musician, guitarist and music producer (born 1973)

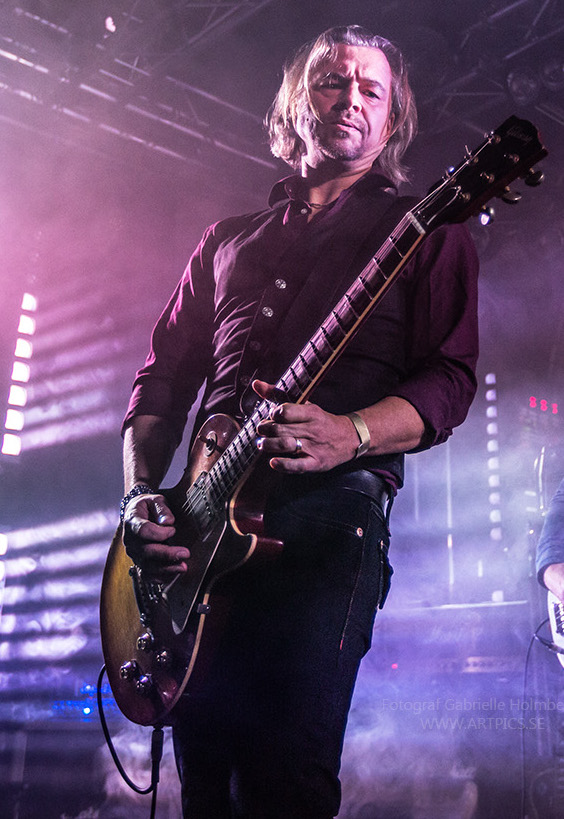
- Österlind in 2024

Background information
- Also known as: Staffan Osterlind, Sycamore-73, S’ÖLIN, Staffon Osterlind
- Born: 10 March 1973 (age 52); Risinge, Sweden
- Genres: Heavy metal; hard rock; progressive rock; ambient music; instrumental music; synth
- Occupations: Guitarist, Producer, Audio Engineer and music teacher
- Instrument: Guitar
- Years active: 1989–present
- Labels: Ninetone Group, Staffan Österlind Music, Fassberg & Osterlind Music
- Spouse: Ulrica Maria Österlind (m. 2025)
- Website: staffanosterlind.com

Staffan Österlind (born 10 March 1973) is a Swedish musician, guitarist and music producer best known for being a guitarist with Paul Di'Anno (the vocalist of Iron Maiden) across South America, Europe, and Asia and producing Paul Di'Anno's cover of Kashmir. He played the guitar with Tuff and Black Robot in the US and with the Danish rock band Supercharger across Europe. Österlind also produced two of Erika Wagenius albums, Close Quarters album Always A Lot Never Little and The Soul Exchange's album Memories or Illusions.

== Career ==
=== 1993-2009 ===
From 1993 to 1997 Staffan Österlind studied at The Academy of Music in Malmö. There he started the band A Tribute to Led Zeppelin with drummer Pontus Snibb (Bonafide), and Johan Pihleke. After graduating the Music Academy with a master's degree in music in 1997 he started teaching music at the senior highschool Nicolaiskolan in Helsingborg. In 2005 he started playing the guitar with Paul Di'Anno, the vocalist of Iron Maiden and toured 13 countries with him. In 2006 Österlind produced and arranged the cover song of Kashmir by Led Zeppelin with Paul Di'Anno on vocals.

=== 2009-present ===
Österlind moved to Hollywood, Los Angeles, California, U.S. in 2009 and studied at Musician's Institute of Technology where he got an associate's degree in guitar and music production. While living in Los Angeles Österlind worked with Black Robot, Tuff, Stacy Barthe, Tony DeNiro, Seven Strait, LA Velvet, Beck, Phil Soussan and performed in Huell Howser's California's Gold. Österlind also worked at the famous Guitar Center on Sunset Blvd.

After moving back to Sweden, Österlind joined Danish rock band Supercharger and went on a European tour with them and the Swedish band H.E.A.T. Österlind produced the album Always A Lot Never Little with Close Quarters which became one of the best-selling rock albums in Sweden in 2015. Österlind has produced and was co-writer for Erika Wagenius album Remedy For Sobriety, released in 2020. 2021 he produced Marina Ammouri's single Latita (Let's Do What U Want). Same year he produced The Soul Exchange's album Memories or Illusions. He also produced Erika Wagenius album United States of Erika, released 2024.

Österlind plays with ARRIVAL From Sweden-The Music of ABBA (original ABBA bassist Mike Watson) and has toured with them in Europe and Asia as ”Björn” and plays all the guitar parts live. Österlind also plays with Wrethov's Bryan Adams Tribute with Anderz Wrethov (songwriter in Melodifestivalen), Fredrik "Figge" von Wachenfeldt (Wallmans Copenhagen) and John Löfgren (E-Type) and A Tribute to Led Zeppelin with Pontus Snibb (Bonafide), Sampo Axelsson (Lion's Share) and Johan Pihleke (Kvinnaböske Band). In 2024 Österlind started playing and touring in Spain with the show Road To Hell, A Tribute to AC/DC, produced by Moonworld Records.

=== SYCAMORE-73 ===
In 2023 and 2024 Österlind released seven singles with instrumental music recorded with a guitar synthesizer under the alias SYCAMORE-73. Under the same alias he also released three guitar based chill out songs with Niclas Lundqvist. (Also known as 08 Pulse and LUNIQ). In 2025 Österlind released the album Hollywoodland, the album Destiny together with the artist ALNA and the same year he also released music for Instagram reels and other social media posts in the album Micro Songs.

=== From The Sky ===
2020 Österlind together with Pontus Snibb and Sampo Axelsson, started the band From The Sky. Pontus Snibb was the initiator and brought the friends together. It has resulted in one album (released 2021) several singles and one EP so far. The band is signed to the record label Ninetone Group.

== Discography ==
Contents

Album, single, EP produced by Österlind (sortable)

Type	Artist(s)	Name	Year	Ref(s)
Single	SYCAMORE-73	Desmond Boulevard	2023	
Single	SYCAMORE-73	Ennis House	2023	
Single	SYCAMORE-73	Wells of Hollywood	2023	
Single	SYCAMORE-73	Runyon Canyon	2023	
Single	SYCAMORE-73	Outpost	2023	
Single	SYCAMORE-73	Stars of Griffith	2023	
Single	SYCAMORE-73, Niclas Lundqvist	Sensuous	2023	
Single	SYCAMORE-73, Niclas Lundqvist	Sensuous-Ambient Version	2023	
Single	SYCAMORE-73, Niclas Lundqvist	Relief Beach	2023	
Single	SYCAMORE-73, Niclas Lundqvist	Relief Beach-Chill-out Version	2023	
Single	SYCAMORE-73, Niclas Lundqvist	Sundown Shore	2023	
Single	SYCAMORE-73, Niclas Lundqvist	Sundown Shore-Ambient Version	2023	
Single	SYCAMORE-73	Schwab's	2024	
Album	From The Sky	From The Sky	2021	
Single	From The Sky	Mirage	2021	
Single	From The Sky	Higher	2022	
Single	From The Sky	Jack Bauer	2022	
Single	From The Sky	Solid Point Of View	2022	
EP	From The Sky	The Diversity EP(Four Styles, One Band)	2022	
Song	Paul Di'Anno	Kashmir (World's Greatest Metal Tribute to Led Zeppelin)	2006	
Song	Sol Skugga	Crash (Swimming Without Webbed Toes)	2007	
Song	Sol Skugga	Avenge Revenge (Swimming Without Webbed Toes)	2007	
Song	Sol Skugga	Love and Affection (Gardenia)	2008	
Song	Paul Di'Anno	Kashmir (Led Box - The Ultimate Led Zeppelin and Tribute)	2008	
Album	Grand Rezerva	Grand Rezerva	2009	
Album	Close Quarters	Always A Lot, Never Little	2015	
Album	Erika	Remedy for sobriety	2020	
Single	Marina Ammouri	LATITA (Let's Do What U Want)	2021	
Single	The Soul Exhange	We All Burn	2021	
Single	The Soul Exhange	Oblivion	2021	
Album	The Soul Exhange	Memories or Illusions	2021	
Single	Erika	Sugarcoated	2024	
Single	Erika	CHOKING ON MY SILVERSPOON	2024	
Album	Erika	United States Of Erika	2024	
Album	SYCAMORE-73	Hollywoodland	2025	
Album	SYCAMORE-73	Micro Songs	2025	
Album	SYCAMORE-73, ALNA	Destiny	2025	
