= Head Down (Rival Sons album) =

Studio album by Rival Sons
- Released: September 17, 2012
- Recorded: 2011–2012
- Genre: Blues rock, hard rock
- Length: 56:19
- Label: Earache
- Producer: Dave Cobb

Rival Sons chronology
Pressure & Time (2011)	Head Down (2012)	Great Western Valkyrie (2014)

Singles from Head Down
- 1. "Until the Sun Comes" Released: September 17, 2012; 2. "Keep On Swinging" Released: December 6, 2012; 3. "Manifest Destiny Pt. 1" Released: April 20, 2013; 4. "You Want To" Released: August 26, 2013; 5. "Wild Animal" Released: 2013

Head Down is the third studio album by the blues rock band Rival Sons. The album was released on September 17, 2012 in the UK and was released in the rest of Europe on September 14, 2012. It is the last Rival Sons album recorded by the original line-up, prior to bass player Robin Everhart's departure in August 2013. On May 24, 2024, a remaster of the album was released.

== Critical reception ==
Professional ratings
Review scores
Source	Rating
AllMusic	3/5 stars
The Guardian	4/5 stars
Metal Temple	8/10 stars

Head Down has been met with mostly positive reviews. William Clark of Guitar International wrote, "Rival Sons have rocketed back on to our radar with their new album, Head Down, and despite the title it shows the band heading nowhere but up." Greg Moffitt of the BBC praised the band for their craftsmanship of 60s and 70s blues and hard rock music reminiscent of Led Zeppelin, Deep Purple, and The Doors, saying that the album "honours half a century of classic rock with reverence, respect and the realisation that this music’s still happening, right now." AllMusic's Jon O'Brien admired the collaboration between the band and Dave Cobb for bringing "a sense of adventure" to their recreation of the Zeppelin sound, saying that "there's much to enjoy on this typically ballsy and no-nonsense follow-up to 2011 breakthrough Pressure & Time."

== Track listing ==
All lyrics are written by Jay Buchanan; all music is composed by Jay Buchanan, Scott Holiday, Robin Everhart and Michael Miley, except where noted.

No.	Title	Writer(s)	Length
1.	"Keep On Swinging"		4:00
2.	"Wild Animal"		3:27
3.	"You Want To"	Buchanan, Holiday, Everhart, Miley, Dave Cobb	4:15
4.	"Until the Sun Comes"	Buchanan, Holiday, Everhart, Miley, Cobb	2:59
5.	"Run from Revelation"		4:14
6.	"Jordan"	Buchanan	6:18
7.	"All the Way"	Buchanan	5:10
8.	"The Heist"		3:13
9.	"Three Fingers"		3:17
10.	"Nava"	Holiday	2:01
11.	"Manifest Destiny Pt. 1"	Buchanan, Holiday, Everhart, Miley, Cobb	8:20
12.	"Manifest Destiny Pt. 2"		4:24
13.	"True"	Buchanan, Holiday	4:43
Total length:			56:19

== Personnel ==
- Jay Buchanan – vocals
- Scott Holiday – guitars
- Robin Everhart – bass
- Michael Miley – drums

== Charts ==
Chart (2012)	Peak position
Austrian Albums (Ö3 Austria)	68
Belgian Albums (Ultratop Flanders)	60
Belgian Albums (Ultratop Wallonia)	59
Dutch Albums (Album Top 100)	79
Finnish Albums (Suomen virallinen lista)	13
French Albums (SNEP)	107
German Albums (Offizielle Top 100)	38
Italian Albums (FIMI)	88
Norwegian Albums (VG-lista)	14
Scottish Albums (OCC)	29
Swedish Albums (Sverigetopplistan)	6
Swiss Albums (Schweizer Hitparade)	30
UK Albums (OCC)	31
UK Independent Albums (OCC)	5
UK Rock & Metal Albums (OCC)	1
US Heatseekers Albums (Billboard)	32
