= Kristin Diable =

American songwriter

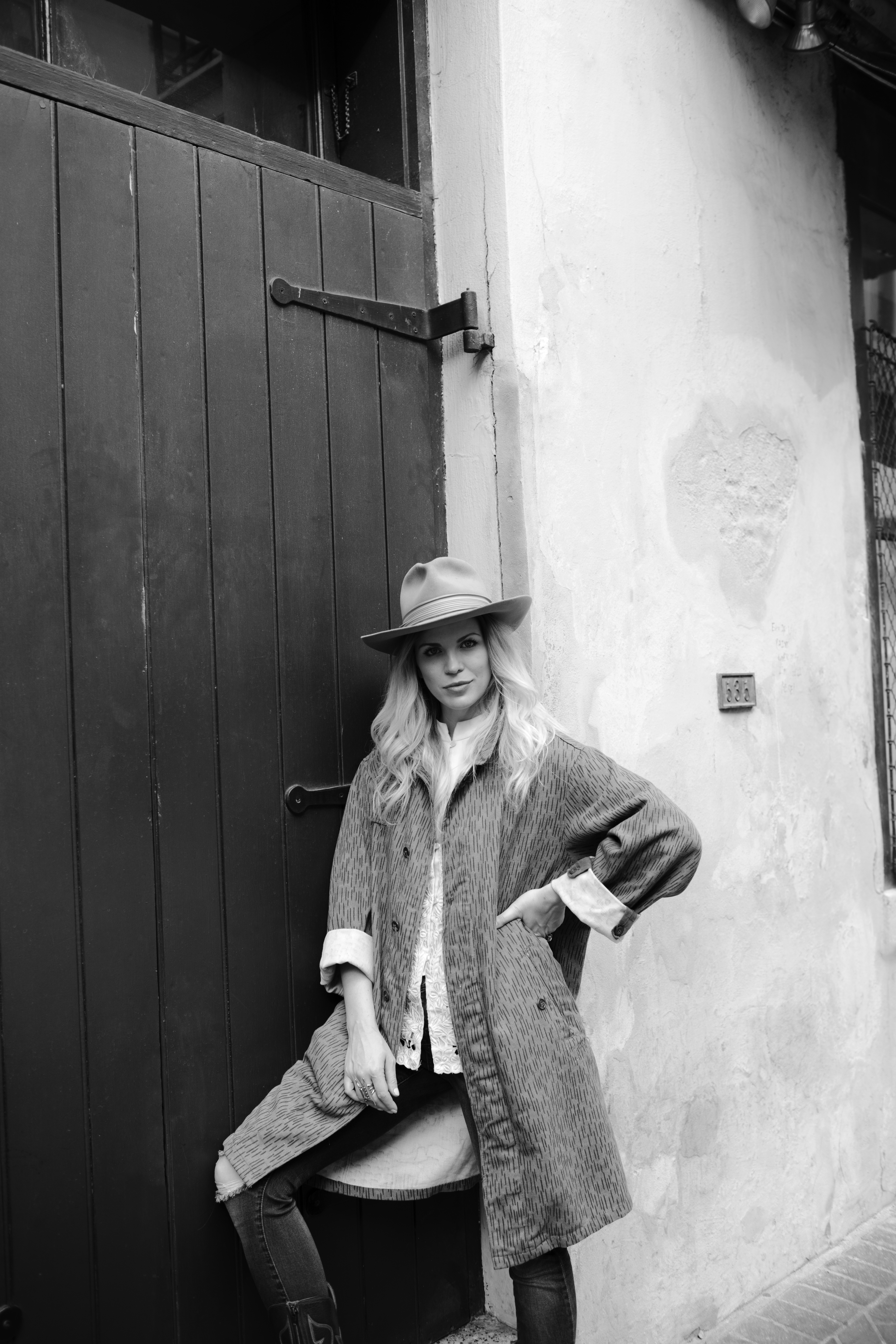
- photo: Nathan Rocky

Background information
- Born: Baton Rouge, Louisiana
- Genres: Americana, soul, rock and roll
- Years active: 2004-present
- Labels: Speakeasy Records, Thirty Tigers
- Website: www.kristindiable.com

Kristin Diable is an American musician, songwriter, and singer from New Orleans, Louisiana.

== Musical career ==
Diable began her musical career as a young teenager in south Louisiana playing underground clubs. She moved to New York City at the age of 18, expanding her musical palette and garnering mainstream music industry attention for the first time. Despite numerous well-received concerts and collaborations with local artists, she followed her muse back to her native Louisiana in the late-2000s. She released a solo EP titled Extended Play in 2009 via Speakeasy Records. Three years later she released an album titled Kristin Diable and the City via Speakeasy Records, garnering critical regional acclaim. Songs from the album were featured on HBO's "True Blood" and "Treme" television series.

She released her third full-length album and first national album in 2015 titled Create Your Own Mythology via Speakeasy Records/Thirty Tigers. The album was produced by Dave Cobb (Sturgill Simpson, Jason Isbell) and received a 4 out of 5 star review from American Songwriter Magazine. "It's still early in 2015, but with a release this powerful, look for Kristin Diable to be one of the year’s breakout artists." - American Songwriter. NPR premiered the album on its First Listen series. "In the rhythm behind her and the twang of her long vowels, she's got the easy, yeah-you-right swagger of her Louisiana roots....Diable has the same grit lining her throat that Amy Winehouse had, but sings from a place of levity that Winehouse never found."

Create Your Own Mythology garnered a loyal cult fan base and was named one of American Songwriter Magazine's top 50 Records of 2015 stating "the organic approach is largely responsible for Diable finding her sultry voice. It helps to have written some terrific swampy yet floating melodies too. When your album kicks off with the bluesy, instantly memorable swagger of "I'll Make Time For You" and closes on the dark, churchy bittersweet tang of "Honey, Leave The Light On," you have tapped into a muse that is diverse, distinctive and delightfully edgy." Tracks from the record were also included in NPR's Best Songs of 2015. "Honey Leave Your Light On" was featured in the episode Ke Ku 'Ana in Season 7 of Hawaii Five-0.

== Film and television ==
Diable was the lead actress in the short film Forever Waves. Director and producer Jeffrey Roedel enlisted Diable on the project as a co-writer and composer as well. The film earned an Award of Excellence in the Best Shorts Competition and was featured at Louisiana International Film Festival and French Quarter Festival. "Kristin Diable is a natural fit for the lead. Her story is relatable and engrossing." - MATTHEW JACOBS (The Huffington Post)

From 2017-2018 Diable participated as a judge and mentor in the Louisiana based CBS music show "Sing Like a Star," alongside Terrance Simien, Marc Broussard and host Arthel Neville.

== Personal life ==
Diable lives in New Orleans, LA. When not touring with the band, she cites regular travel around the world for inspiration. Diable gave birth to her first child, Lucinda, in 2019.

== Discography ==
Studio albums

- Shelter (2005, Speakeasy Records)
- Kristin Diable & The City (2013, Speakeasy Records)
- Create Your Own Mythology (2016, Speakeasy/Thirty Tigers)
- Impossible Things (2026, Speakeasy Records)

EPs

- As You Were (2004, Meridian Jane Records)
- Extended Play (2009, Speakeasy Records)

Singles

- "Magnolia" (2017, Speakeasy Records)
- "The Christmas Song" (2019, Speakeasy Records)
- "Joy to the World" (2019, Speakeasy Records)
