= Cottage School =

Coordinates: 34.0145°N 84.3366°W

The Cottage School
- Roswell, Georgia; United States

Information
- Type: Private Special education
- Established: 1985
- Staff: 111 (as of 2023)
- Faculty: 41.6 (on FTE basis)
- Grades: K to 12
- Enrollment: 267 (as of August 2024)
- Student to teacher ratio: 10
- Mascot: Cougar
- Website: www.cottageschool.org

The Cottage School, often referred to as TCS or Cottage, is a special education
school located in Roswell, Georgia, United States. It focuses on elementary, middle, and high school students with special needs.

== History ==
The Cottage School was formed in 1985 by founders Jacque and Joe Digieso. While it initially began as only a high school, the school eventually expanded to include middle elementary school.

Many of the school's buildings on its 24-acre campus are renovated residential homes purchased over time, which is also the reason for the name "The Cottage School."

By the start of the 2023-24 school year, TCS had students from grades 3-12. In 2024, the school purchased and renovated a nearby school campus for use as an elementary school. To fill the new teaching space, TCS now includes grades K-2 in its elementary school program.
