= Pressure & Time =

Studio album by Rival Sons
- Released: June 28, 2011
- Recorded: 2010–2011
- Genre: Blues rock, hard rock
- Length: 30:55
- Label: Earache
- Producer: Dave Cobb

Rival Sons chronology
Rival Sons-EP (2011)	Pressure & Time (2011)	Head Down (2012)

Singles from Pressure & Time
- 1. "Soul" Released: 2011; 2. "All Over the Road" Released: 2011; 3. "Pressure & Time" Released: 2011; 4. "Company Man / Life for This Road" Released: 2012

Pressure & Time is the second studio album by American rock band Rival Sons. It was released on June 20, 2011, in the UK and was released in the United States on June 28, 2011, through UK independent label Earache Records. The cover artwork was designed by Storm Thorgerson, who had worked for Led Zeppelin and Pink Floyd before. A music video has been released for title track "Pressure & Time", which features the band performing in different backgrounds. The title track was also used as the theme song of the 2013 action-adventure video game Ride to Hell: Retribution, was featured in the movie Swearnet and in the commercial for the 2024 Chevrolet Silverado. The track "Get Mine" was featured in a Jeremiah Weed premium malt beverage television advertising campaign showing an arm wrestling competition.

== Critical reception ==
Professional ratings
Review scores
Source	Rating
AllMusic	3.5/5 stars
Altsounds	(favorable)
Cinema Blend	3.5/5 stars
The Guardian	2/5 stars
FasterLouder.com.au	(favorable)
Hardrock Haven	(9.4/10)
Metal Temple	8/10 stars
Rockfreaks.net	9/10 stars

AllMusic editor William Ruhlmann noted how the band was an oddity in Earache's mostly death metal roster but gave praise to their musical ability to harken back to late 1960s hard rock reminiscent of Led Zeppelin ("Pressure & Time", "Gypsy Heart") and "Hush"-era Deep Purple ("All Over the Road"), concluding that "anyone who likes that kind of music should overlook the implications of the record label and check out Rival Sons." Joseph Giannone of Cinema Blend was ambivalent towards the record, commending the band's catchy musicianship for capturing late 1960s and 1970s hard rock, but felt it lacked virtuosity and a style to call their own. He singled out the title track, "Gypsy Heart" and "Face of Light" for showcasing the band's potential in their given subgenre and should be used as a blueprint to follow, saying that "[i]f only Rival Sons spent more time creating fantastic songs like those… instead of concerning themselves with easily digestible music, then maybe this album would have been distinguished."

== Track listing ==
All lyrics are written by Jay Buchanan.

No.	Title	Music	Length
1.	"All Over the Road"	Scott Holiday, Jay Buchanan, Robin Everhart	2:54
2.	"Young Love"	Buchanan, Holiday, Dave Cobb	3:00
3.	"Pressure and Time"	Holiday, Buchanan, Everhart, Michael Miley	3:19
4.	"Only One"	Holiday, Buchanan, Everhart, Cobb	3:14
5.	"Get Mine"	Holiday, Buchanan, Cobb	2:24
6.	"Burn Down Los Angeles"	Buchanan	2:29
7.	"Save Me"	Holiday, Buchanan	2:33
8.	"Gypsy Heart"	Holiday, Buchanan, Everhart	3:29
9.	"White Noise"	Buchanan, Miley, Cobb	3:04
10.	"Face of Light"	Buchanan, Holiday	4:29
Total length:			30:49

iTunes version
No.	Title	Length
11.	"Company Man"	3:13
12.	"Life for This Road"	3:29
Total length:		37:31

UK bonus tracks [Limited Edition]
No.	Title	Length
11.	"Torture"
12.	"Soul"
13.	"Sleepwalker"

Japanese bonus track
No.	Title	Length
11.	"Sleepwalker"

Redux Edition/Deluxe Edition
No.	Title	Length
11.	"Company Man"
12.	"Life for This Road"

== Personnel ==
Adapted credits from the liner notes of Pressure & Time.

Rival Sons

- Jay Buchanan – vocals
- Scott Holiday – guitar
- Robin Everhart – bass
- Michael Miley – drums

Additional musicians

- Arlan Shierbaum – Wurlitzer, B3 ("Only One" and "Face of Light")

Production

- Dave Cobb – production
- Pete DiRado – recording, engineering
- Mark Rains – mixing
- Pete Lyman – mastering

== Charts ==
Chart (2011)	Peak position
Belgian Albums (Ultratop Flanders)	89
Norwegian Albums (VG-lista)	34
Swedish Albums (Sverigetopplistan)	52
Swiss Albums (Schweizer Hitparade)	33
UK Independent Albums (OCC)	19
UK Rock & Metal Albums (OCC)	9
US Heatseekers Albums (Billboard)	19
