= Hollow Bones =

Studio album by Rival Sons
- Released: June 10, 2016
- Recorded: RCA Studio A Low Country Sound Studio, Nashville, TN; House of David; Sixteen Ton Studio, Nashville, TN
- Genre: Blues rock, hard rock
- Length: 37:06
- Label: Earache
- Producer: Dave Cobb

Rival Sons chronology
Great Western Valkyrie (2014)	Hollow Bones (2016)	Feral Roots (2019)

Singles from Hollow Bones
- 1. "Tied Up" Released: April 2016

Hollow Bones is the fifth LP studio album by the American rock band Rival Sons, released on June 10, 2016.

== Track listing ==
No.	Title	Writer(s)	Length
1.	"Hollow Bones Pt. 1"	Scott Holiday, Jay Buchanan, Michael Miley, Dave Cobb	2:52
2.	"Tied Up"	David Beste, Buchanan, Holiday	3:27
3.	"Thundering Voices"	Holiday, Buchanan, Cobb, Miley	2:53
4.	"Baby Boy"	Buchanan, Holiday	3:37
5.	"Pretty Face"	Buchanan, Holiday	3:23
6.	"Fade Out"	Holiday, Buchanan	4:50
7.	"Black Coffee"	Ike Turner, Tina Turner	5:34
8.	"Hollow Bones Pt. 2"	Buchanan, Holiday, Miley, Beste	6:50
9.	"All That I Want"	Buchanan	3:39
Total length:			37:06

The vinyl version contains tracks 1–5 on side A and tracks 6–9 on side B.

== Personnel ==
Rival Sons

- Jay Buchanan – vocals
- Scott Holiday – guitar, string arrangement
- Dave Beste – bass guitar
- Michael Miley – drums

Additional musicians

- Todd E. Ogren-Brooks – keyboards
- Kristen Rogers, Whitney Coleman and April Rucker – backing vocals on "Tied Up" and "Black Coffee"
- Eamon McLoughlin – cello, violin

Production

- Dave Cobb – production
- Matt Ross'Spang – recording engineer (tracks 1–6, 8–9)
- Eddie Spear – mixing
- Pete Lyman – mastering
- John Netti – recording engineer for "Black Coffee"

Additional

- Emilia Pare – photography
- Martin Wittfooth – album artwork and layout
- Luke Martin (at House of David), Mark Esser (at Sixteen Tons Studios) – tracking seconds

Credits adapted from liner notes.

== Charts ==
Chart (2016)	Peak position
Austrian Albums (Ö3 Austria)	24
Belgian Albums (Ultratop Flanders)	49
Belgian Albums (Ultratop Wallonia)	28
Dutch Albums (Album Top 100)	67
Finnish Albums (Suomen virallinen lista)	6
French Albums (SNEP)	54
German Albums (Offizielle Top 100)	12
Italian Albums (FIMI)	81
Norwegian Albums (VG-lista)	6
Swedish Albums (Sverigetopplistan)	7
Swiss Albums (Schweizer Hitparade)	8
UK Albums (OCC)	13
UK Independent Albums (OCC)	3
UK Rock & Metal Albums (OCC)	3
US Billboard 200	115
US Top Album Sales (Billboard)	36
US Top Hard Rock Albums (Billboard)	2
US Heatseekers Albums (Billboard)	1
US Independent Albums (Billboard)	7
US Top Rock Albums (Billboard)	13
US Indie Store Album Sales (Billboard)	12
