= Houndmouth =

American alternative blues band

- Origin: New Albany, Indiana
- Genres: Alternative country; indie rock; folk rock; Americana
- Years active: 2011–present
- Labels: Dualtone; Reprise; Rough Trade
- Members: Matt Myers (guitar, vocals); Caleb Hickman (keyboard, vocals); Zac Anderson (bass, vocals); Noah Denney (drums)
- Past members: Zak Appleby (bass, vocals); Shane Cody (drums, vocals); Katie Toupin (keyboard, vocals); Sam Filiatreau (bass, vocals); Aaron Goodrich (drums); Dave Givan (drums)
- Website: houndmouth.com

Houndmouth is an American alternative blues and rock band from New Albany, Indiana, formed in 2011, consisting of Matt Myers (guitar, vocals), Caleb Hickman (keyboard, vocals), Zac Anderson (bass, vocals), and Noah Denney (drums).

== Background ==
Houndmouth formed in the summer of 2011. After playing locally in Louisville, Kentucky and Indiana, they performed at the SXSW music festival in March 2012 to promote their homemade self-titled 4-song EP. Geoff Travis, the head of Rough Trade was in the audience and offered a contract shortly after. In 2012, the band was named "Band of the Week" by The Guardian.

=== From the Hills Below the City (2013) ===
In 2013 Houndmouth's debut album, From the Hills Below the City, was released by Rough Trade. This led to performances on Letterman, Conan, World Cafe, and several major festivals (ACL, Americana Music Festival, Bonnaroo, Lollapalooza, and Newport Folk Festival). Spin and Esquire named Houndmouth a "must-see" band at Lollapalooza, and Garden & Gun said, "You'd be hard pressed to find a more effortless, well-crafted mix of roots and rock this year than the debut album from this Louisville quartet."

=== Little Neon Limelight (2015) ===
The band's second LP, Little Neon Limelight, was released on March 17, 2015. It includes the single "Sedona". The band performed "Sedona" on the Late Show with David Letterman on March 31, 2015, and at the El Rey Theatre in Los Angeles was featured on Last Call with Carson Daly on November 18 and 27, 2015.

=== Golden Age (2018) ===
On August 3, 2018, Houndmouth released their third album, Golden Age. This was the first album they released after Katie Toupin left the band to pursue her own endeavors.

=== Good for You (2021) ===
On November 5, 2021, Houndmouth released their fourth album, the 10-song pandemic-written Good for You. Written and recorded at The Green House in New Albany, Indiana, a 19th-century shotgun house owned by the family of drummer Shane Cody, it is accompanied by several videos shot at the house and released around the time of the album's release.

=== Lordy (2026) ===
On July 10, 2026, Houndmouth released their fifth album, "Lordy".

== Discography ==
=== Albums ===
==== Studio albums ====
List of albums, with selected chart positions
Title	Album details	Peak chart positions			
Title	Album details	US	US Folk	US Indie	US Rock
From the Hills Below the City	Released: May 31, 2013; Label: Rough Trade	— (Note: From the Hills Below the City did not enter the US Billboard 200, but peaked at number five on the Top Heatseekers Albums Chart.)	—	36	—
Little Neon Limelight	Released: March 16, 2015; Label: Rough Trade	118	6	8	15
Golden Age	Released: August 3, 2018; Label: Reprise	— (Note: Golden Age did not enter the US Billboard 200, but peaked at number two on the Top Heatseekers Albums Chart.)	—	—	—
Good for You	Released: November 5, 2021; Label: Dualtone	— (Note: Good for You did not enter the US Billboard 200, but peaked at number 13 on the Top Heatseekers Albums Chart.)	16	—	—
Lordy	Released: July 10, 2026; Label: Dualtone	—	—	—	—
"—" denotes a recording that did not chart or was not released in that territory.

==== Live albums ====
- Houndmouth Live From SXSW 2015 (2015)

=== EPs ===
- Houndmouth EP (2012)
- California Voodoo (2018)
- California Voodoo, Pt. II (2019)
- Tiger Blood (2026)

=== Singles ===
Single	Year	Peak chart positions				Certifications	Album
Single	Year	US AAA	US Alt	US Rock	CAN Rock	Certifications	Album
"Sedona"	2015	1	13	31	29	RIAA: Platinum; MC: 2× Platinum	Little Neon Limelight
"Say It"	2015	13	—	—	—		Little Neon Limelight
"This Party"	2018	—	—	—	—		Golden Age
"Cool Jam" / "Good for You"	2021	—	—	—	—		Good for You
"Las Vegas"	2021	28	—	—	—		Good for You
"Tiger Blood"	2026	32	—	—	—		Lordy
"—" denotes a recording that did not chart or was not released in that territory.
