= Rival Sons =

American rock band

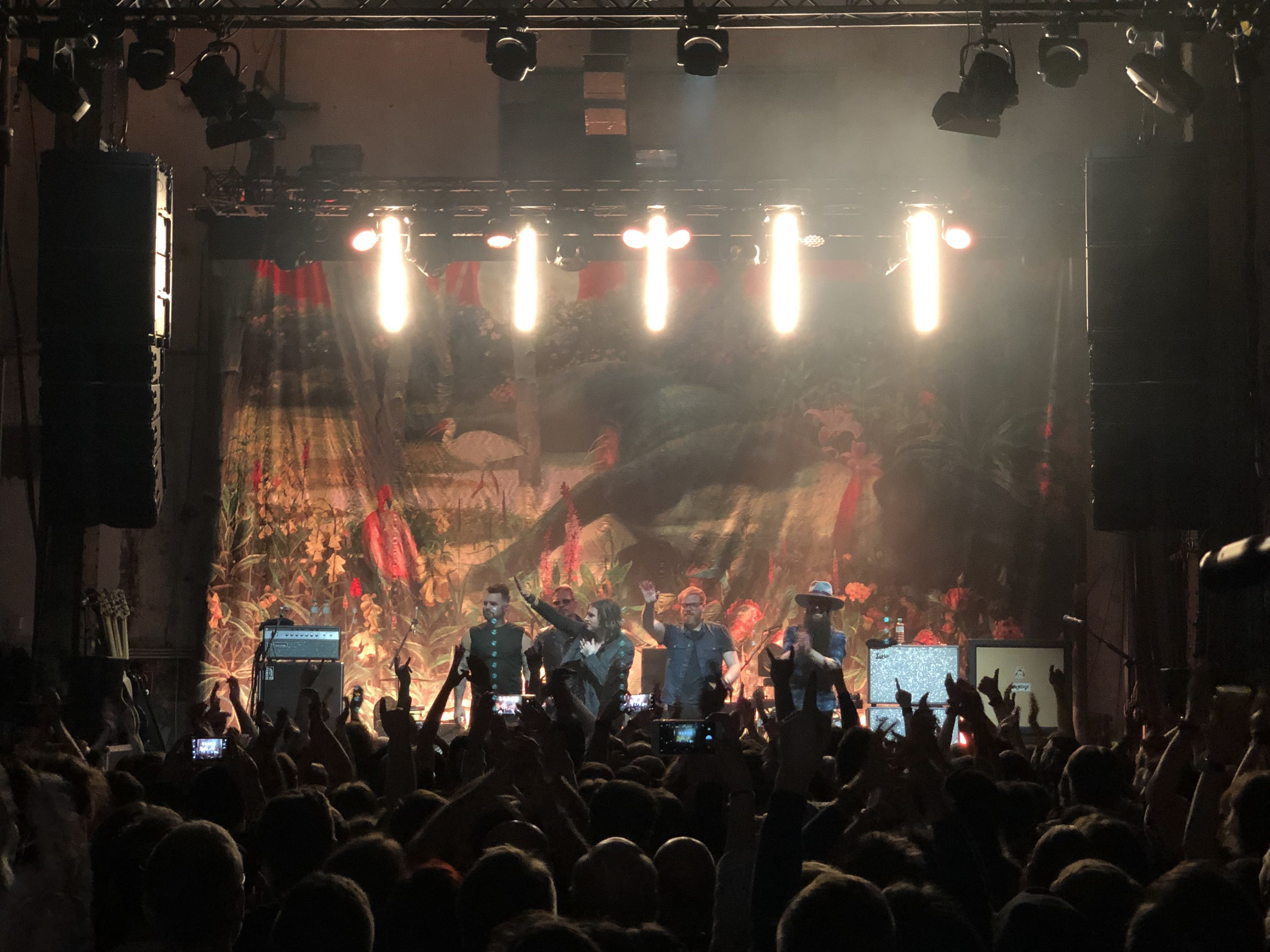
- Rival Sons in 2019

Background information
- Origin: Long Beach, California, U.S.
- Genres: Blues rock; hard rock; classic rock revival
- Years active: 2009–present
- Labels: Earache; Warner Music Group; Atlantic; Elektra; Low Country Sound
- Members: Jay Buchanan; Scott Holiday; Michael Miley; Dave Beste
- Past members: Robin Everhart; Todd Ögren
- Website: rivalsons.com

Rival Sons are an American rock band formed in Long Beach, California in 2009 and also affiliated with Nashville, Tennessee. The band consists of Jay Buchanan (lead vocals), Scott Holiday (guitar), Dave Beste (bass guitar) and Michael Miley (drums). In their most recent tour they were joined by keyboard player Jesse Nason, and Todd Ögren accompanied them on previous tours. They are signed to Atlantic Records via Dave Cobb's label Low Country Sound, an imprint of Elektra.

They have released eight albums and one EP, and have twice been nominated for Grammy awards.

== History ==
=== Formation and debut album Before the Fire (2006–2009) ===
Rival Sons formed in Long Beach, California, where Jay Buchanan and Michael Miley lived. Buchanan previously recorded as a solo artist and with his Buchanan band. He independently released All Understood in 2004 and True Love EP in 2006. Rival Sons formed from the remnants of guitarist Scott Holiday's previous band. He had been active in a number of bands, including humanLab, who were signed to Atlantic Records, but which he left and formed Black Summer Crush with Michael Miley, Robin Everhart Thomas Flowers and original drummer J. Harley Gilmore. Black Summer Crush recorded an album and the vocals on those tracks were later replaced by Jay Buchanan and released as Rival Sons' debut album.

In 2006 Holiday came across Buchanan while searching on MySpace for a singer. Drummer Michael Miley had previously worked with Buchanan (as well as having been in Veruca Salt and the Carson Daly TV show band) and he had met bassist Robin Everhart playing at a benefit concert at Isaac Hayes house for Hurricane Katrina in Long Beach. The union of Holiday, Buchanan, Everhart and Miley led to the formation of Rival Sons.

As a singer-songwriter Buchanan was skeptical about joining a rock and roll band but after seeing the reception to the band's debut album Before the Fire (2009) produced by Dave Cobb, Buchanan committed to Rival Sons full-time. Jack Rivera of HuffPost declared them "A rock band to watch" in November 2009. Following this acclaim, they were invited to perform as a supporting act for AC/DC, Alice Cooper and Kid Rock shows. During this time, Rival Sons also performed on the race track during a televised show of the Indianapolis 500.

=== EP, signing and worldwide release of second album Pressure & Time (2010–2011) ===
After the success of Before the Fire, the band recorded a self-titled EP (independently released) in 2010, which caught the attention of Earache Records founder Digby Pearson and the band was offered a record deal in November 2010. The signing led to the band immediately recording the album Pressure & Time on the Earache label in early 2011. Their self-titled EP was re-released digitally by Earache Records in February 2011, from which their debut European single, "Torture", was taken.

Rival Sons played at Gene Simmons' "Aces & Angels" Super Bowl party on February 2, 2011, before making their European debut appearance at Camden Barfly on February 12, 2011, for the HMV Next Big Thing. The band Vintage Trouble supported their act and the show sold out in advance, which started a nearly unbroken string of European sell-out shows. In March 2011 a string of shows at Canadian Music Week, SXSW and the House of Blues was announced.

Rival Sons released Pressure & Time in June 2011. It reached number one on Amazon's Hard Rock best sellers and nineteen on the Billboard Hot 100.

Storm Thorgerson, who had worked with bands such as Pink Floyd, Led Zeppelin and Genesis, created the cover art for the album voluntarily. Thorgerson liked Rival Sons, saying about the cover art:

"I don't think you can be certain what's going on here. To me it's a picture about fear or concern. Here's someone about to descend and doesn't know what they'll face, or where this might lead. So, in his mind he's imagining the action. That's what you see, into his mind, as he focuses on what's about to happen.

When he gets to the bottom of the stairs, where does he go? Turn left, right or straight ahead, anything's possible. And I hope this cover will have fans of the band intrigued for a long while. To me, the cover should be part of the album, and not just packaging."

- Storm Thorgerson (2011)

Rival Sons played a string of Canadian dates in May 2011, as well as SXSW, Hangout festival and the Viper Room, before returning to Europe to play a series of European festivals such as Azkena, Sonisphere, Rock Werchter, Main Square, Putte Parken, and Bospop in July 2011. Then the band joined Judas Priest, Queensrÿche and Lady Starlight on tour in the UK.

Rival Sons' track "Torture" was featured in the film Real Steel in October 2011 and the band, by personal request of Amy Lee, supported Evanescence in the US in October 2011, whom they would play with again in January 2012. While Rival Sons continued to tour extensively, in 2012 they featured on the Harald Schmidt Show and played an acoustic set at the annual Classic Rock awards at the Roundhouse in London. They were voted 'Best New Band' by listeners of Planet Rock Radio. In mid-2012, Pressure & Time was voted number two album of the year and the band named "Breakthrough Artist of the Year" by Classic Rock Magazine.

=== Head Down and Dave Beste joins the band on bass (2012–2013) ===
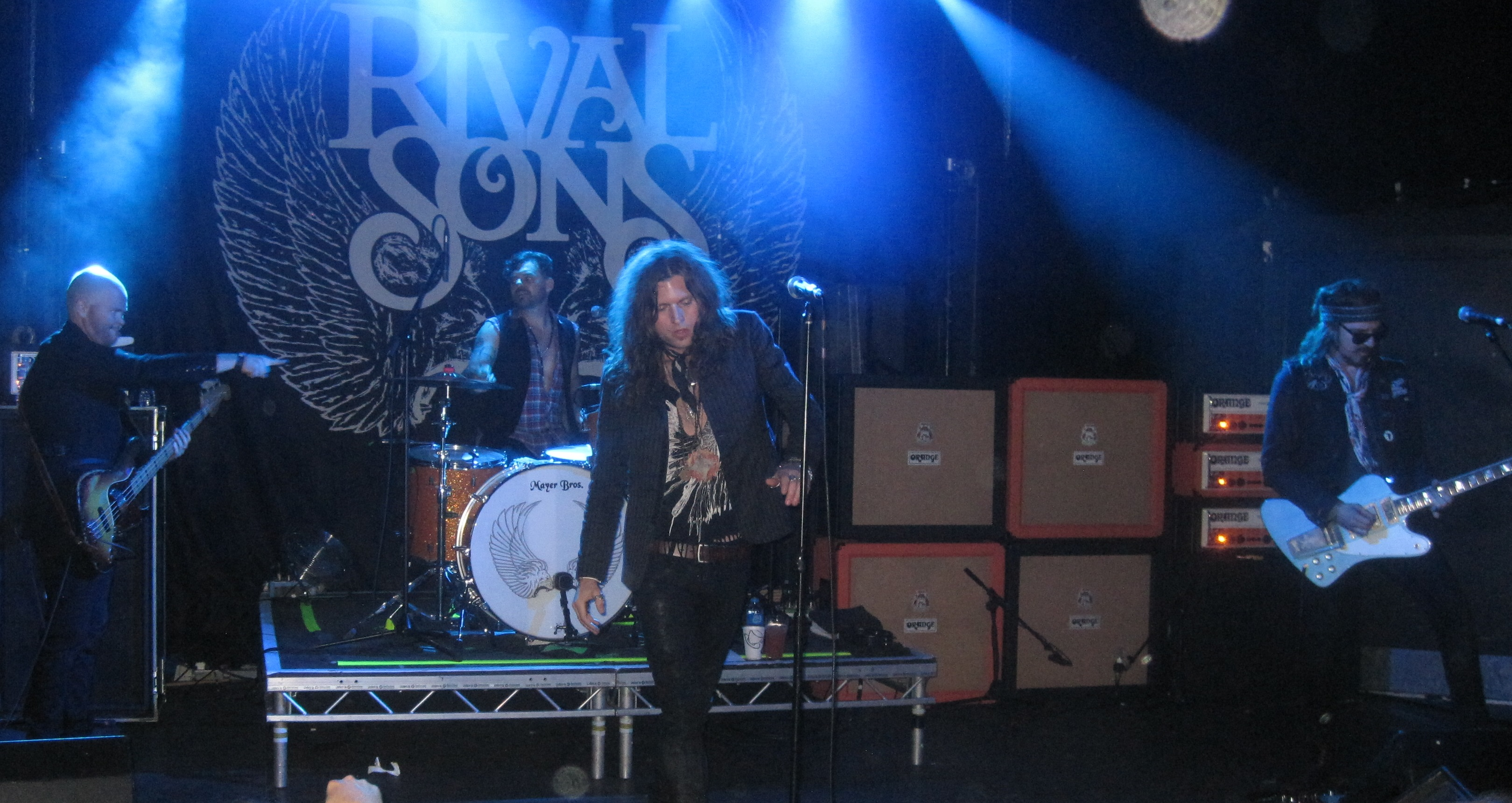
Rival Sons performing in 2013

In February 2012 the band went into Honey Pye studios in Nashville, Tennessee, for twenty days to record their third full-length LP album Head Down with Dave Cobb and this time award-winning engineer Vance Powell (Jack White, The Raconteurs).

During this time, the album Pressure & Time was reissued as a deluxe edition from which the last single "Face of Light" was taken. A video for the single was filmed in the UK's Peak District. The band then embarked on US and Canadian shows including Rock on the Range and Big Music Fest before a string of European summer festivals including Rock Am Ring, Sweden Rock, Ruisrock, Bukta, Graspop and Download. The band again also played European shows with Evanescence and Eagles of Death Metal as well as Black Stone Cherry.

Head Down was released in September 2012 to critical acclaim. The album charted at number 31 in the UK album chart, number 5 in the UK indie chart, number 6 in Sweden, number 13 in Finland, number 14 in Norway, number 30 in Switzerland and number 38 in Germany. The debut single "Keep On Swinging" started a trend on Twitter, and the video was filmed in a church with snakes. The band then went on to complete another sold-out European tour and were featured on the cover of Classic Rock Magazine. They also received the 'Breakthrough artist' award presented by Vic Reeves. In January 2013 the band released a second single from Head Down with a video for "Until The Sun Comes" directed by Simon Gesrel, known for his stop-motion work and his work with Michel Gondry (The White Stripes, Björk).

In March 2013 the band recorded for Billboard The Beat and appeared on Jimmy Kimmel Live. On March 7, 2013, Rival Sons left on a tour of Europe supported by The Balconies. In April they toured the UK supported by The Graveltones and Ulysses culminating in a sold-out show at Shepherd's Bush Empire. Rival Sons also played a station session in St. Pancras, London, for the second time to raise money for the National Society for the Prevention of Cruelty to Children.

Rival Sons did a small Mid-West USA tour in May before returning to Europe in June to play more summer festivals including Download, Kivenlahti Rock, Bergenfest, Bravalla, Main Square and Open Air St. Gallen. The band also supported Kiss in Italy and Switzerland. During this time bassist Robin Everhart quit the band for 'personal reasons' stating "After years of intensive touring with Rival Sons, I have come to the conclusion that I am not a road-warrior and that the rock 'n' roll lifestyle' is not for me."

In September 2013 Rival Sons supported Sammy Hagar across the US with new bassist Dave Beste, previously of Rocco DeLuca and the Burden. The band played Hard Rock Vegas in December and started the new year by headlining a street party in their hometown of Long Beach.

=== Great Western Valkyrie and Hollow Bones (2014–2017) ===
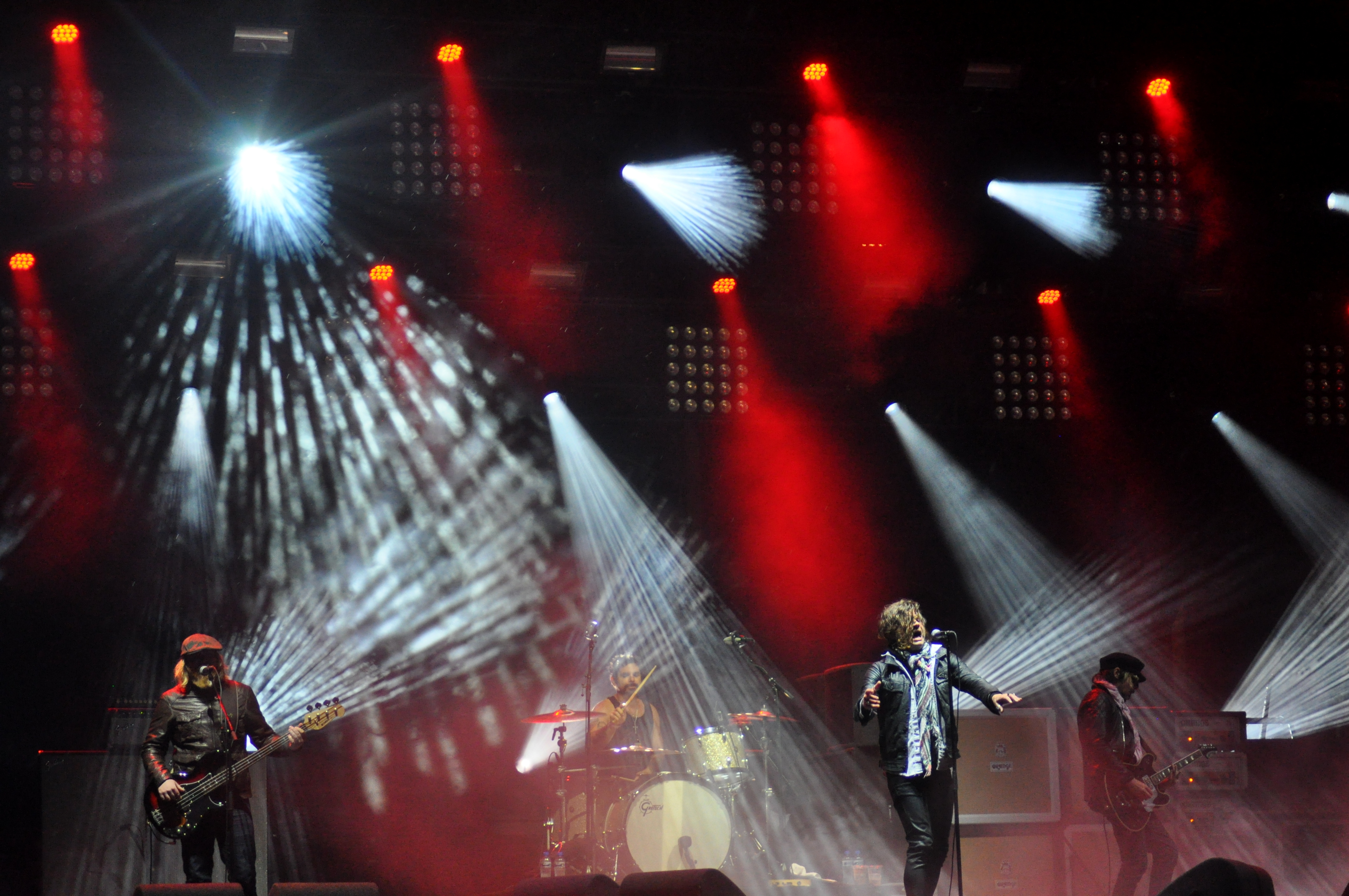
Rival Sons in 2015

In January 2014 Rival Sons returned to the studio in Nashville with Cobb to produce their fourth full-length LP album. Amidst great anticipation of their fan base, the critically acclaimed Great Western Valkyrie was released in June 2014. Even before the album's release Rival Sons began their 2014 European Tour opening for Aerosmith in Helsinki, Finland, and Stockholm, Sweden. The summer tour continued through Europe with club and festival dates in Germany at Rock Am Ring and Rock Im Park, then onto four sold-out shows in the United Kingdom and the Isle of Wight Festival 2014.

They returned across the Atlantic to begin the USA 2014 summer tour with a sold-out show at 3rd and Lindsley in Nashville. The US tour included several festivals and two sold-out dates in New York City. Rival Sons travelled back and forth between US and Canadian dates mid-summer, before heading back to Northern Europe for four large festivals, ending the summer with a trip to South Africa to play the Oppikopi Festival.

After a rest Rival Sons began the second leg of the US tour playing dates in California including The Fillmore in San Francisco and a sold-out show at the legendary The Troubadour. More Fall 2014 US Tour dates included shows in Arizona, Nebraska, Nevada, Massachusetts, Pennsylvania, New York, Maryland and New Jersey.

Rival Sons had several live television performances in 2014, the first on Le Grand Journal (Canal+), where Rival Sons first introduced their first ever touring keyboard player Todd Ögren, who has since become known as "The Fifth Son". In October Late Night with David Letterman and Later… with Jools Holland. They performed live at the 2014 Classic Rock Magazine Classic Rock Roll of Honour Awards. Great Western Valkyrie was released in late 2014. It was nominated for "Album of the Year" in 2014 by Classic Rock Magazine. In the Classic Rock magazine gala they famously met Ozzy and Sharon Osbourne. The encounter resulted in them being invited as an exclusive support act for Black Sabbath final The End tour.

In October 2015 they recorded their fifth LP album Hollow Bones, again with music producer Cobb, in just three weeks. Rival Sons toured the United Kingdom from March to April 2015 as well as played the main stage at Download Festival in 2016. Hollow Bones was officially released July 2016.

After the recording they toured with Deep Purple in their 2016 European tour. Throughout 2016 and into early 2017 they toured as main supporting act on the entirety of Black Sabbath's notable The End Tour.

=== Signing to Atlantic Records and Feral Roots (2018–2021) ===
On February 27, 2018, it was officially announced that Rival Sons had signed on with Low Country Sound an imprint of Elektra run by Dave Cobb.

Rival Sons released their sixth studio album Feral Roots on January 25, 2019, to critical acclaim. The album received nominations for two awards at the 2020 Grammy Awards, one for Best Rock Album and the other for Best Rock Performance for the song "Too Bad." It also won the 2019 Metal Storm Award for Best Hard Rock Album.

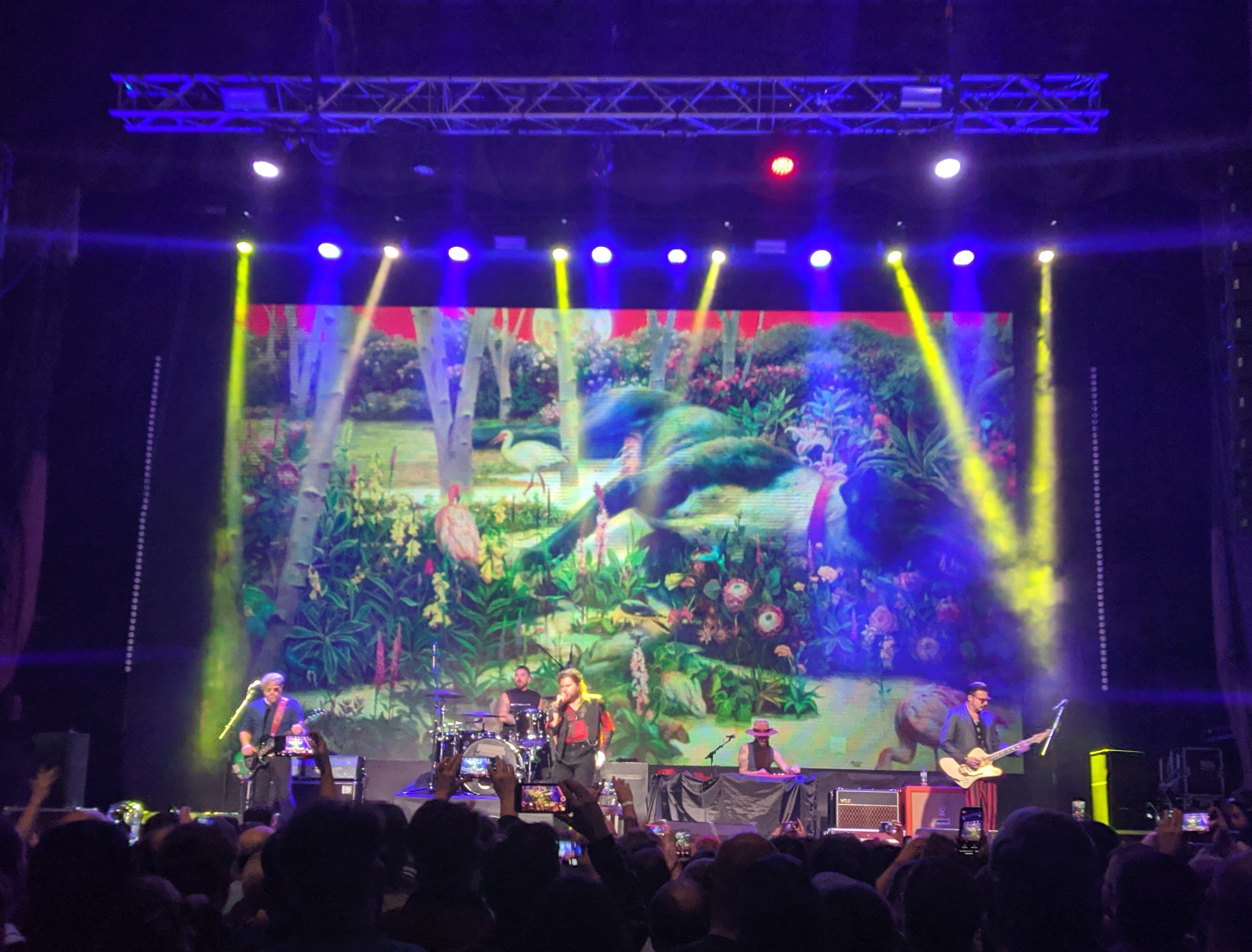
Rival Sons performing in Moscow, Russia on November 30, 2019, Izvestiya Hall

On May 9, 2019, the band appeared on the Late Late Show with James Corden, performing "Too Bad". In Fall 2019, the band capitalized on the success of Feral Roots and embarked on a Co-Headline tour with Stone Temple Pilots across North America. On October 11, 2019, Rival Sons performed a stripped-down version of "Do Your Worst" at the Grammy Museum in Los Angeles.

=== Pressure & Time 10-Year Anniversary Tour (2021–2022) ===
In honor of their 2011 album, Pressure & Time, the Rival Sons went on tour beginning in 2021 as a 10-year anniversary of the album. On some shows, the album was played in its entirety. At this time, Nobody Wants to Die, on their later 2023 album, was debuted.

=== Darkfighter and Lightbringer (2023) ===
On October 14, 2022, the band released a single titled "Nobody Wants to Die"; a music video was also released. Three more singles were released, in 2023, Rapture, Bird in the Hand, and Guillotine. On May 23, 2023, it was announced that Todd Ögren was leaving the band for personal reasons. The band's seventh album, Darkfighter, was released on June 2, 2023, on CD, streaming and on vinyl. Only two months later, a single for the second album, Lightbringer was released, Sweet Life. Mercy was also released soon after. On October 20, 2023, Lightbringer was released, as six-track album with their longest track to date, Darkfighter. According to Jay Buchanan, the band spent the most time on these two albums compared to previous releases, and many tracks such as Darkside are very personal to the band members.

The Darkfighter tour began in America, but moved to Europe in October. Due to Ögren's departure as well as difficult vocals for Jay Buchanan in songs such as Mirrors or Darkfighter, some tracks were performed live in an alternate manner, such as using transpositions or substitute instruments. In the early stages of the Darkfighter tour, Buchanan used a horizontal strummer for songs such as Guillotine or Horses Breath.

=== European Double Tours and Two-Headed Beast Tour (2023–2024) ===
In fall 2023, the Darkfighter tour moved to Europe, beginning on October 13. After Lightbringer was released, many of these songs were included in the setlists. Jay Buchanan began to express the shock and sympathy he had towards the victims of the Israel-Hamas conflict by dedicating Shooting Stars to the children victims. During this tour, a new keyboardist was introduced, Jesse Nason. Nason did not appear after this tour.

In summer 2024, a second European tour began, this time dedicated to Head Down.

In fall 2024, Rival Sons will have a Two-Headed Beast Tour in America with Clutch, in which they dedicate to Great-Western Valkyrie.

=== Pair of Aces Live Albums ===
In late 2024, the Rival Sons released two live albums entitled Pair of Aces in which they played the albums Before the Fire and Rival Sons in their entirety. The performances were from Santa Catalina Island in June 2021.

== Artistry ==
=== Songwriting and recording process ===
Rival Sons' early albums, including Pressure & Time, were written and recorded in the studio in an intense period of creativity. Speaking about the sophomore album that was written and recorded in 20 days, with producer Dave Cobb, guitarist Scott Holiday said, "This is just the simplest way to not cheat ourselves or the listener, rock and roll can't be over-thought, and if it is, it loses its immediacy and instinct...it needs to be a knife fight, not a knife dance."

Rival Sons have recorded regularly, releasing seven records in ten years. "Opting to keep the sound intact and very accurate as to deliver to the listener exactly what was happening in the room when we put it down" – Holiday, talking about the album Great Western Valkyrie.

The band has a long-standing, friendly and professional relationship with Grammy award-winning music producer Cobb, who has worked on all the band's albums and is often referred to as another member of the band. He is interested in simplicity in the recording and with the sound and vitality of real musicians in a room. Cobb encourages and captures the vocal punch of the band's mainman, Jay Buchanan. "He's unbelievable, a one-take guy — done. It's such a pleasure, because then you can get wild with things. You can experiment when it doesn't take long for the singer to do his thing."

Rival Sons recording process changed for their major label debut Feral Roots, for the first time writing and recording over a process of months. Jay Buchanan stated that "You need to shift and constantly find new soil" within the creative process, taking eight months to write and record the Grammy nominated album instead of all their previous work which took less than six weeks.

=== Style and influences ===
Rival Sons are often compared to sounds of the 1970s yet they cite Prince, D'Angelo and The Roots as influences alongside Muddy Waters and Howlin' Wolf. Jay has listed artists from Joni Mitchell to Sly and the Family Stone amongst his influences, often stating Van Morrison as one of his heroes. "I can't overstate his influence on me as a writer and vocalist" – Louder Sound.

The band are often cited for the sartorial style as well as their musical style, with Scott Holiday known for working with tailor Ray Brown and the band often wearing boots by UK bootmaker Jeffery West. Scott Holiday is known for his slim-line tailored suits, moustache and sunglasses, Jay Buchanan's style is unpredictable including wearing flowers in his hair, flowing floral shirts and tight leather suits.

== Band members ==
=== Current members ===
- Jay Buchanan – lead vocals, rhythm guitar, harmonica (2009–present)
- Scott Holiday – lead guitar, backing vocals (2009–present)
- Mike Miley – drums, percussion, backing vocals (2009–present)
- Dave Beste – bass guitar, backing vocals (2013–present)

=== Former members ===
- Robin Everhart – bass guitar (2009–2013)

=== Touring and studio members ===
- Todd Ögren – keyboards, percussion, backing vocals (2014–2023)
- Jesse Nason - keyboards (2023–present)

== Discography ==
=== Studio albums ===
Year	Album details	Chart peak										
Year	Album details	US	AUT	BEL (FL)	FIN	FRA	GER	NL	NOR	SWE	SWI	UK
2009	Before the Fire: Released: June 9, 2009; Label: self-released	–	–	–	–	–	–	–	–	–	–	–
2011	Pressure & Time: Released: June 28, 2011; Label: Earache	–	–	89	–	–	–	–	34	52	33	129
2012	Head Down: Released: September 17, 2012; Label: Earache	–	68	60	13	107	28	79	14	6	30	31
2014	Great Western Valkyrie: Released: June 6, 2014; Label: Earache	125	41	62	3	60	24	55	5	10	12	14
2016	Hollow Bones: Released: June 10, 2016; Label: Earache	115	24	49	6	54	12	67	6	7	8	13
2019	Feral Roots: Released: January 25, 2019; Label: Low Country Sound/Atlantic	139	16	37	43	46	8	79	4	4	7	12
2023	Darkfighter: Released: June 2, 2023; Label: Low Country Sound/Atlantic	–	–	69	37	59	15	–	–	–	10	30
2023	Lightbringer: Released: October 20, 2023; Label: Low Country Sound/Atlantic	–	19	153	–	65	17	–	–	–	14	48

=== Extended plays ===
Year	Title	Details
2010	Rival Sons	Released: June 20, 2010; Label: Earache

=== Singles ===
Year	Song	Chart peak						Album
Year	Song	US Air.	US Main. Rock	US Rock	CAN Alt	CAN Rock	NZ Hot	Album
2011	"Soul"	—	—	—	—	—	—	Rival Sons
2011	"Pressure and Time"	—	—	—	48	4	—	Pressure & Time
2011	"All Over the Road"	—	—	—	—	—	—	Pressure & Time
2012	"Face of Light"	—	—	—	—	20	—	Pressure & Time
2012	"Company Man/Life for This Road"	—	—	—	—	—	—	Pressure & Time
2012	"Keep On Swinging"	—	34	—	—	1	—	Head Down
2012	"Until the Sun Comes"	—	—	—	—	5	—	Head Down
2013	"Wild Animal"	—	—	—	—	—	—	Head Down
2013	"You Want To"	—	—	—	—	45	—	Head Down
2013	"Manifest Destiny Pt. 1" (live)	—	—	—	—	—	—	Non-album single
2014	"Electric Man"	—	—	—	—	40	—	Great Western Valkyrie
2014	"Open My Eyes"	—	—	—	—	1	—	Great Western Valkyrie
2014	"Good Things"	—	—	—	—	—	—	Great Western Valkyrie
2015	"Black Coffee"	—	—	—	—	—	—	Hollow Bones
2016	"All That I Want"	—	—	—	—	—	—	Hollow Bones
2016	"Thundering Voices"	—	—	—	—	—	—	Hollow Bones
2016	"Tied Up"	—	—	—	—	—	—	Hollow Bones
2018	"Do Your Worst"	15	1	35	—	1	—	Feral Roots
2019	"Too Bad"	35	13	—	—	41	—	Feral Roots
2019	"Shooting Stars"	36	16	—	—	—	—	Feral Roots
2022	"Nobody Wants to Die"	—	19	—	—	—	26	Darkfighter
2023	"Rapture"	—	—	—	—	—	—	Darkfighter
2023	"Bird in the Hand"	—	—	—	—	—	—	Darkfighter
2023	"Guillotine"	—	—	—	—	—	—	Darkfighter
"—" denotes a release that did not chart.

=== Music videos ===
Year	Song	Director	Ref.
2010	"Get What's Coming"	Unknown	
2011	"Pressure and Time"	Greg Ephraim	
2011	"All Over The Road"	Greg Ephraim	
2012	"Face of Light"	Dan Ruttley	
2012	"Keep On Swinging"	Greg Ephraim	
2012	"Until the Sun Comes"	Simon Gesrel	
2014	"Open My Eyes"	Greg Ephraim	
2015	"Electric Man"	Markus Rutledge	
2018	"Do Your Worst"	Andy Garza	
2019	"Too Bad"	Jordan Bellamy	
2019	"Sugar On The Bone"	Patrik Skoglöw	
2022	"Nobody Wants To Die"	Éli Sokhn	
2023	"Rapture"	Kurt Kubicek	
2023	"Bird In The Hand"	Kurt Kubicek	

== Awards and nominations ==
Year	Nominated work	Event	Award	Result
2011	Rival Sons	Classic Rock Roll of Honour Awards	Best New Band	Nominated
2012	Rival Sons	Classic Rock Roll of Honour Awards	Breakthrough Artist	Won
2014	Great Western Valkyrie	Classic Rock Roll of Honour Awards	Album of the Year	Nominated
2019	"Too Bad"	Grammy Award	Grammy Award for Best Rock Performance	Nominated
2019	Feral Roots	Grammy Award	Grammy Award for Best Rock Album	Nominated
