= Dave Cobb =

American record producer (born 1974)

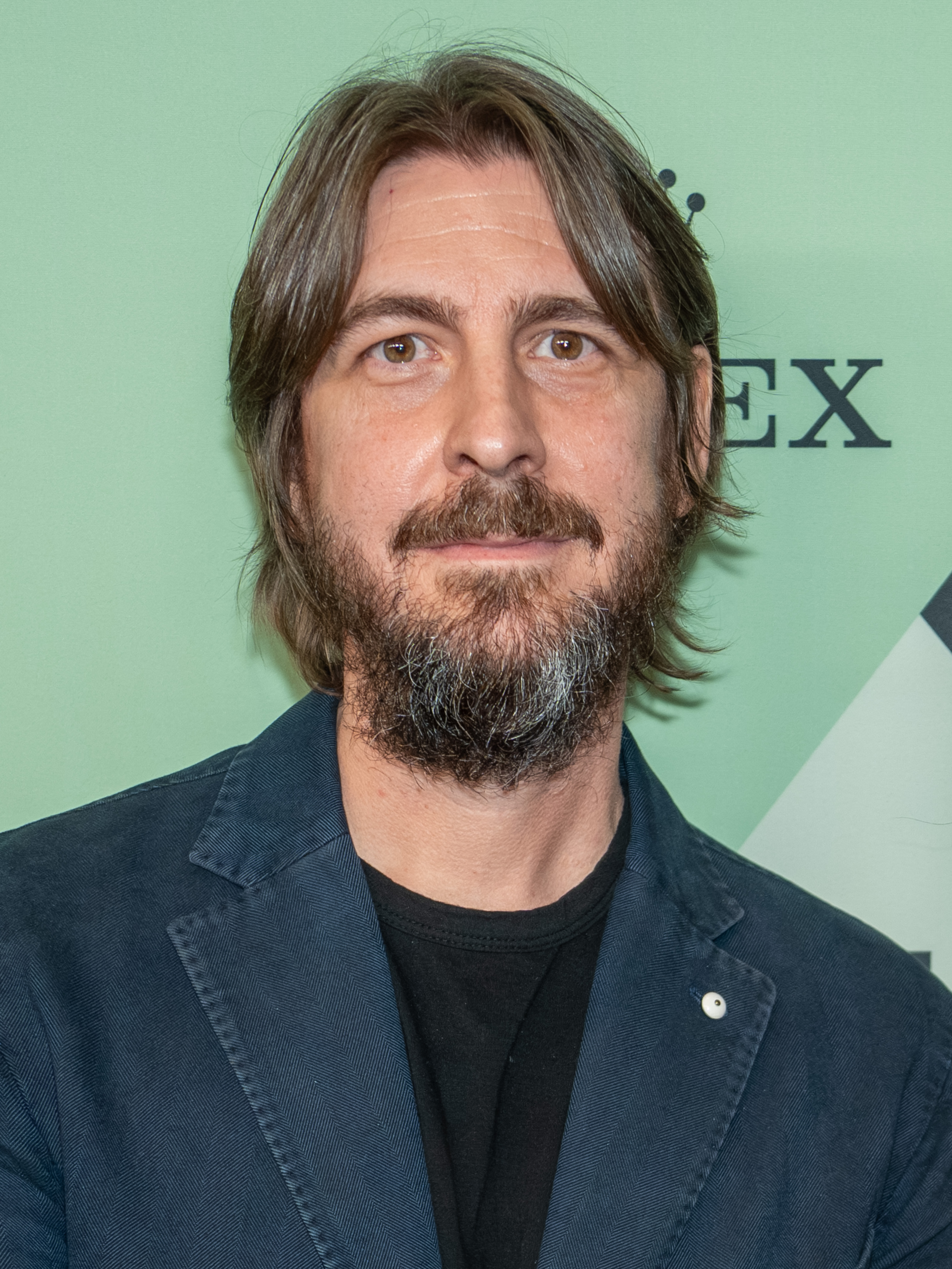
- Cobb in 2025

Background information
- Born: July 9, 1974 (age 52); Savannah, Georgia, U.S.
- Genres: Americana; country; rock and roll
- Occupations: Record producer; songwriter; recording engineer
- Years active: 2005–present
- Website: davecobbproducer.com

Dave Cobb (born July 9, 1974) is an American record producer based in Nashville, Tennessee, best known for producing the work of Chris Stapleton, Brandi Carlile, John Prine, Sturgill Simpson, Jason Isbell, The Highwomen, Take That, Rival Sons, The Oak Ridge Boys, Shooter Jennings, and Zayn Malik. Cobb contributed to the six million-selling 2018 A Star Is Born soundtrack and produced "Always Remember Us This Way" for Lady Gaga.

== Early life ==
Cobb was born in Savannah, Georgia, to Mary Cobb (née Floyd) and David Cobb, Sr.. He attended The Cottage School in Roswell.

Cobb said his family was very religious and was active in the Pentecostal faith (his maternal grandmother was a minister). Cobb began playing drums and taking guitar lessons at church when he was four years old.

== Career ==
Cobb's career in music began as a session musician in Atlanta, sometimes working with producers Dallas Austin and Jermaine Dupri. In the mid 90s, he was a founding member of the Atlanta band Shimmerzine, featuring Matt Odom (vocals), Joe Jones (Bass), and Jeremy Truitt (drums). They landed the song "Blue" on the 99X Locals Only compilation CD, along side other acts like The Marvelous Three, Sevendust, and more. In the late 1990s he joined Britpop band The Tender Idols, featuring Ian Webber (vocals), Danny Howes (guitar), Guy Strauss (drums), and Joe Jones (bass), with Cobb on guitar and bass. The band signed with New York record label Emagine and released three LPs, the second of which Dave Cobb co-produced. Cobb's involvement in the recording process got him interested in working in the recording studio and led to him recording and producing other bands he was friends with.

Cobb left the band and moved to Los Angeles, California in 2004. Cobb's manager, Andrew Brightman, introduced him to Shooter Jennings, and the two became friends, connecting over shared interest in bands like Ministry, Skinny Puppy, and Nine Inch Nails. Jennings also expanded Cobb's country music education and, in 2005, Cobb produced Jennings' debut solo album Put the "O" Back in Country. Over the next several years, Cobb produced more albums by Jennings, as well as albums by such rock bands as Rival Sons, and co-produced Jamey Johnson's That Lonesome Song (2008) and The Guitar Song (2009).

In 2009, thanks to his connection to Jennings, Cobb produced the Oak Ridge Boys' hit album The Boys Are Back, encouraging the band to record outside their standard catalog, covering The White Stripes, Neil Young, Ray LaMontagne, and John Lee Hooker.

In 2011 Cobb moved to Nashville, Tennessee where he established a recording studio in a bedroom-sized room at the back of his house and named it Low Country Sound. After meeting Sturgill Simpson at a Billy Joe Shaver concert, Cobb produced Simpson's debut studio album High Top Mountain (2013) and its follow-up, Metamodern Sounds in Country Music (2014). Recorded at Cobb's Low Country Sound studio in only four days, Cobb used many different vintage recording techniques, avoiding any electronic recording approaches for this particular album.

Cobb began working with Jason Isbell in 2013. Isbell's album Southeastern, recorded in Cobb's home and studio, was an effort to chronicle an acoustic sound similar to what is found on Simon And Garfunkel's Bridge over Troubled Water, where a non-traditional recording environment was captured to provide an organic, live and "warm" sound. The same year, Cobb helmed Early Morning Shakes, the third studio album from Whiskey Myers.

Cobb met singer-songwriter Anderson East at Nashville's Bluebird Cafe, and Cobb ended up producing East's 2015 album Delilah, which was recorded at FAME Studios in North Alabama's Muscle Shoals. Rodney Hall from FAME allowed the pair into the archives, where they found George Jackson's song, "Find 'Em, Fool 'Em, Forget 'Em," which was covered on Delilah. The video for "Find 'Em" was shot at FAME.

In 2015, Cobb founded Low Country Sound (LCS), an imprint of Elektra with distribution from Atlantic Records. The debut project for Low Country Sound was Delilah. The same year, Cobb co-produced Chris Stapleton's debut studio album Traveller at the historic RCA Studio A on Nashville's Music Row, which was slated for demolition. The album topped the Billboard Year-End Top Country Albums chart in 2016 and 2017, and won the Best Country Album.

In 2016, the collaborative album Southern Family was released on the Low Country Sound imprint. Produced and curated by Cobb, the concept album was inspired by White Mansions, with themes centered on family values and the artist's experiences growing up in the South. Among those taking part were Zac Brown, Anderson East, Jason Isbell, Shooter Jennings, Jamey Johnson, Miranda Lambert, Morgane, and Chris Stapleton.

RCA Studio A was saved from demolition, and in 2016, Cobb began a long-term residency at the studio. The title of Chris Stapleton's 2017 releases From A Room: Volume 1 and From A Room: Volume 2 refer to the albums being recorded at the studio, as does The Oak Ridge Boys' 2018 release, 17th Avenue Revival, referring to the studio's location on 17th Avenue in Nashville.

In 2022, Cobb produced Gavin DeGraw's Face the River, 4 by Slash featuring Myles Kennedy and the Conspirators, as well as Sammy Hagar and the Circle's album Crazy Times.

In 2024, Cobb produced singer-songwriter Oliver Anthony's debut album Hymnal of a Troubled Man’s Mind, who came to prominence half a year prior with the viral single "Rich Men North of Richmond". While most of the songs were already released as acoustic recordings, they were re-recorded and provided with new arrangements by Cobb.

== Artistic approach ==
Cobb has said he focuses on the performer's voice, aiming for an end product which sounds natural. Cobb often plays guitar, and occasionally drums, on the records he produces. Cobb cites Jimmy Miller (Sticky Fingers, Exile on Main Street) as an important influence in his approach to producing, as well as Glyn Johns and Brendan O'Brien. Current influences include Gabriel Roth (Daptone Records).

Cobb also is known to not have a preference over analog recordings versus digital, instead believing the spontaneous nature of creativity as well as the inspiration derived from new discovery, predominantly drives the organic quality of a song.

== Personal life ==
Cobb lives in the Green Hills neighborhood of Nashville, Tennessee. Cobb is married; he and his wife, who is from Albania, have one daughter together.

One of Cobb's paternal cousins from Georgia is the singer-songwriter Brent Cobb. Additionally, Cobb said he grew up with musician Butch Walker.

Cobb has talked about the long-term passion that turned into a serious hobby where he explores different types of wine, especially from Paso Robles and other California vineyards.

== Awards ==
- 2011: Grammy Award for Best Country Album (nominee) for Jamey Johnson's The Guitar Song
- 2014: Americana Music Association, Album of the Year for Jason Isbell's Southeastern
- 2014: Americana Music Association, Producer of the Year
- 2014: Grammy Award for Best Americana Album (nominee) for Sturgill Simpson's Metamodern Sounds in Country Music
- 2015: Grammy Award for Producer of the Year (nominee)
- 2015: Grammy Award for Best Country Album for Chris Stapleton's Traveller – as producer
- 2015: Grammy Award for Best Americana Album for Jason Isbell's Something More Than Free – as producer
- 2016: Americana Music Association, Album of the Year, Jason Isbell's Something More Than Free
- 2016: Americana Music Association, Producer of the Year
- 2016: Music Row awards, Producer of the Year
- 2017: Country Music Awards, Chris Stapleton's From A Room: Volume 1
- 2017: Country Music Awards, Producer of the Year
- 2018: Grammy Award for Best Americana Album (nominee) for Brent Cobb Shine On Rainy Day
- 2018: Grammy Award for Best Americana Album for Jason Isbell and the 400 Unit's The Nashville Sound – as producer
- 2018: Grammy Award for Best Country Album for Chris Stapleton's From A Room: Vol. 1 – as producer
- 2019: Grammy Award for Best American Roots Song for Brandi Carlile's "The Joke" – as co-writer, producer
- 2019: Grammy Award for Best Americana Album for Brandi Carlile's By the Way, I Forgive You – as producer
- 2022: Grammy Award for Best Country Album for Chris Stapleton's Starting Over - as producer
- 2022: Grammy Award for Best Country Song for Chris Stapleton's "Cold" - as songwriter and producer
- 2023: Grammy Award for Best Americana Album for Brandi Carlile's In These Silent Days - as producer

== Equipment ==
- Console / board: HELIOS by Dick Swettenham (Abbey Road Studios)
- Recorder: Endless Analog's CLASP (Closed Loop Analog Signal Processor)
- Converters: Burl Audio B80 Mothership and the B32 Vancouver

== Selected discography ==
| Artist | Album | Label | Credit | Year |
|---|---|---|---|---|
| Robert Jon and The Wreck | Heartbreaks and Last Goodbyes | Journeyman Records | Producer | 2025 |
| Brigitte Calls Me Baby | The Future Is Our Way Out | ATO | Producer | 2024 |
| The Red Clay Strays | Made By These Moments | RCA | Producer | 2024 |
| Zayn | Room Under the Stairs | Mercury | Producer | 2024 |
| The Oak Ridge Boys | Mama's Boys | Lightning Rod Records | Producer | 2024 |
| Greta Van Fleet | Starcatcher | Universal | Producer | 2023 |
| William Prince | Stand in the Joy | Six Shooter Records | Producer | 2023 |
| Sammy Hagar and the Circle | Crazy Times | Universal | Producer | 2022 |
| Gavin DeGraw | Face the River | RCA | Producer | 2022 |
| Slash | 4 (feat Myles Kennedy and The Conspirators) | Gibson Records | Producer | 2022 |
| Jade Bird | Different Kinds of Light | Glassnote Records | Producer | 2021 |
| Barry Gibb | 'Greenfields': The Gibb Brothers Songbook, Vol. 1 | Capitol Records | Producer | 2021 |
| The Oak Ridge Boys | Front Porch Singin' | Lightning Rod Records | Producer | 2021 |
| Chris Stapleton | Starting Over | Mercury Nashville | Producer | 2020 |
| Dawes | Good Luck with Whatever | Rounder Records | Producer | 2020 |
| Jason Isbell and The 400 Unit | Reunions | Thirty Tigers | Producer | 2020 |
| William Prince | Reliever | Six Shooter Records | Producer | 2020 |
| The Oak Ridge Boys | Down Home Christmas | Lightning Rod Records | Producer | 2019 |
| Ian Noe | Between the Country | "National Treasury Recordings" | Producer | 2019 |
| Jason Isbell and The 400 Unit | Live from the Ryman | Thirty Tigers | Mixer | 2019 |
| Dirty Heads | Supermoon | Five Seven | Producer | 2019 |
| Rival Sons | Feral Roots "Do Your Worst" | LCS/Atlantic | Producer | 2019 |
| Brandi Carlile and Sam Smith | "Party of One" Single | | Producer | 2019 |
| Lady Gaga | A Star Is Born Soundtrack "Always Remember Us This Way" | Interscope Records | Producer & Music Consultant | 2018 |
| Marcus King Band | Carolina Confessions | | Producer | 2018 |
| Elle King | Shake the Spirit "Ram Jam" and "Told You So" | RCA | Producer | 2018 |
| Brandi Carlile | By the Way, I Forgive You | Low Country Sound/Elektra | Producer | 2018 |
| The Oak Ridge Boys | 17th Avenue Revival | Lightning Rod Records | Producer | 2018 |
| Lori McKenna | The Tree | CN Records | Producer | 2018 |
| John Prine | The Tree of Forgiveness | Oh Boy Records, Nashville | Producer | 2018 |
| The Revivalists | Take Good Care | | Producer | 2018 |
| Amanda Shires | To The Sunset | | Producer | 2018 |
| Colter Wall | Songs of the Plains | | Producer | 2018 |
| Shooter Jennings | Shooter | | Producer | 2018 |
| Ashley Monroe | Sparrow | Warner Bros. Nashville | Producer | 2018 |
| Wheeler Walker Jr. | WW III | Thirty Tigers | Producer | 2018 |
| Jason Isbell and the 400 Unit | The Nashville Sound | Southeastern | Producer | 2017 |
| Chris Stapleton | From A Room: Volume 1 | Mercury Nashville | Producer | 2017 |
| Europe | Walk the Earth | Hell and Back Records | Producer, co-writer | 2017 |
| Zac Brown Band | Welcome Home | No Reserve/Elektra | Producer | 2017 |
| The Lone Bellow | Walk Into A Storm | Descendant Records/Masterworks | Producer | 2017 |
| Colter Wall | Colter Wall | YMRC/Thirty Tigers | Producer | 2017 |
| Judah & the Lion | Folk Hop n' Roll | CTV/Caroline | Producer | 2017 |
| Wheeler Walker Jr. | Ol' Wheeler | Thirty Tigers | Producer | 2017 |
| Various artists: Anderson East, Dolly Parton, Kris Kristofferson | Cover Stories: Brandi Carlile Celebrates 10 Years of the Story (An Album to Benefit War Child) | Looking Out Foundation | Producer | 2017 |
| Anderson East | "Forever Young" featured in Ram Trucks Television Commercial | Low Country Sound/Elektra | Producer, Performer | 2017 |
| Chris Shiflett | West Coast Town | Le Coq Napoleon/SideOneDummy | Producer | 2017 |
| All Them Witches | Sleeping Through War | New West Records | Producer | 2017 |
| Jillette Johnson | All I Ever See In You Is Me | Rounder | Producer | 2017 |
| Lori McKenna | The Bird and the Rifle | CN Records | Producer | 2016 |
| Brent Cobb | Shine On Rainy Day | Low Country Sound/Elektra | Producer | 2016 |
| Whiskey Myers | Mud | Wiggy Thump | Producer | 2016 |
| Amanda Shires | My Piece of Land | Lightning Rod | Producer | 2016 |
| Judah & the Lion | Folk Hop N' Roll | CTV/Caroline | Producer | 2016 |
| Bonnie Bishop | Ain't Who I Was | Thirty Tigers | Producer | 2016 |
| Brett Dennen | Por Favor | Elektra Records | Producer | 2016 |
| Various artists: Anderson East, Brandy Clark, Brent Cobb, Holly Williams, Jamey Johnson, Jason Isbell, John Paul White, Miranda Lambert, Morgane Stapleton feat. Chris Stapleton, Rich Robinson, Shooter Jennings, Zac Brown Band | Southern Family (compilation) | Low Country Sound/Elektra | Producer | 2016 |
| Lake Street Dive | Side Pony | Nonesuch Records | Producer | 2016 |
| Mary Chapin Carpenter | The Things That We Are Made Of | Lambent Light Records | Producer | 2016 |
| Rival Sons | Hollow Bones | Earache Records | Producer | 2016 |
| The Sore Losers | Skydogs | Excelsior Recordings | Producer | 2016 |
| Holly Williams | TBA | Georgiana Records | Producer | 2016 |
| A Thousand Horses | Southernality | Republic Records | Producer | 2015 |
| Corb Lund | Things That Can't Be Undone | New West Records | Producer | 2015 |
| Kristin Diable | Create Your Own Mythology | Thirty Tigers/Speakeasy Records | Producer | 2015 |
| Chris Stapleton | Traveller | Universal Music Group Nashville | Producer | 2015 |
| Anderson East | Delilah | Elektra Records | Producer | 2015 |
| Chris Isaak | First Comes The Night | Vanguard | Producer | 2015 |
| Christian Lopez Band | Onward | Blaster | Producer, Mixer | 2015 |
| Houndmouth | Little Neon Limelight | Rough Trade Records | Producer, Mixer | 2015 |
| honeyhoney | 3 | Concord Records | Producer | 2015 |
| Finger Eleven | Five Crooked Lines | Concord Records | Producer | 2015 |
| Lindi Ortega | Faded Gloryville | Last Gang Records | Producer | 2015 |
| Europe | War of Kings | Hell and Back Records | Producer, Mixer | 2015 |
| Wheeler Walker Jr. | Redneck Shit | Pepperhill Music | Producer, Mixer | 2015 |
| California Breed | California Breed | Frontiers Records | Producer | 2014 |
| Rival Sons | Great Western Valkyrie | Earache Records | Producer | 2014 |
| Whiskey Myers | Early Morning Shakes | Wiggy Thump Records | Producer, Mixer | 2014 |
| Eliot Bronson | Eliot Bronson | Saturn 5 Records | Producer | 2014 |
| Sturgill Simpson | High Top Mountain | High Top Mountain/Loose Music | Producer | 2013 |
| Sturgill Simpson | Metamodern Sounds in Country Music | High Top Mountain/Loose Music | Producer | 2014 |
| The Wans | He Said, She Said | Independent | Producer | 2014 |
| Jason Isbell | Southeastern | Southeastern/Thirty Tigers | Producer | 2013 |
| Jason Isbell | Something More Than Free | Southeastern/Thirty Tigers | Producer | 2015 |
| Rival Sons | Head Down | Earache Records | Producer, engineer, writer | 2013 |
| Lindi Ortega | Tin Star | Last Gang Records | Producer | 2013 |
| Rival Sons | Pressure & Time | Earache Records | Producer, engineer, writer | 2011 |
| Jamey Johnson | The Guitar Song | Mercury Nashville | Producer | 2010 |
| Jamey Johnson | The Lonesome Song | Mercury Nashville | Producer | 2008 |
| Shooter Jennings | The Wolf | Universal South | Producer | 2007 |
| Shooter Jennings | Electric Rodeo | Universal South | Producer | 2006 |
| Shooter Jennings | Put the "O" Back in Country | Universal South | Producer, engineer, co-writer | 2005 |
| Waylon Jennings | Waylon Forever | Vagrant Records | Producer | 2008 |
| Rival Sons | Before the Fire | Earache Records | Producer | 2009 |
| George Jones | Squidbillies – Theme Song | Cartoon Network | Producer | 2011 |
| A Thousand Horses | A Thousand Horses EP | Interscope Records | Producer | 2009 |
| The Secret Sisters | The Secret Sisters | Universal Republic | Producer | 2010 |
| Brooke White | High Hopes & Heartbreak | June Baby Records | Producer | 2009 |
| Michael Johns | Hold Back My Heart | Downtown Records | Producer, co-writer | 2009 |
| The Oak Ridge Boys | The Boys Are Back | Spring Hill Records | Producer | 2009 |
| Nico Vega | Nico Vega | Myspace Records | Producer | 2007 |
| Black Robot | Black Robot | Brightman Music | Producer, engineer, co-writer | 2007 |
| Chris Cornell | Carry On ("Safe and Sound") | Interscope Records | Producer | 2007 |
| The Strays | Le Future Noir | TVT | Producer, co-writer | 2006 |
| The Ringers | Headlocks and Highkicks | Independent | Producer, co-writer | 2006 |
| Rock 'n' Roll Soldiers | So Many Musicians to Kill | Atlantic | Producer | 2005 |
| The Shys | Astoria | Sire/London/Rhino | Producer, co-writer | 2005 |

=== Film Soundtrack ===
| Song | Year | Album | Co-Artist(s) |
|---|---|---|---|
| "Bad as I Used to Be" | 2025 | F1 the Album | Chris Stapleton |

== See also ==
- Albums produced by Dave Cobb
- RCA Studio A
