= Feral Roots =

Studio album by Rival Sons
- Released: January 25, 2019
- Studio: RCA Studio A (Nashville, Tennessee); Muscle Shoals (Sheffield, Alabama)
- Genre: Blues rock; hard rock
- Length: 46:57
- Label: Low Country Sound/Atlantic
- Producer: Dave Cobb

Rival Sons chronology
Hollow Bones (2016)	Feral Roots (2019)	Darkfighter (2023)

Singles from Feral Roots
- 1. "Do Your Worst" Released: September 14, 2018; 2. "Back in the Woods" Released: November 1, 2018; 3. "Feral Roots" Released: December 14, 2018; 4. "Look Away" Released: January 21, 2019; 5. "Too Bad" Released: April 16, 2019; 6. "Shooting Stars" Released: November 26, 2019

Feral Roots is the sixth studio album by American rock band Rival Sons. It was released on January 25, 2019, through Low Country Sound and Atlantic Records. It is the band's first album since Hollow Bones (2016), and their first release on Atlantic Records. It was preceded by the lead single "Do Your Worst", which peaked at number one on the Billboard Mainstream Rock Songs chart in March 2019.

== Critical reception ==
Professional ratings
Aggregate scores
Source	Rating
Metacritic	79/100
Review scores
Source	Rating
AllMusic	4/5 stars
Consequence of Sound	B+
Exclaim!	6/10

Michael Pementel of Consequence of Sound gave the album a grade of B+ and said the album shows off Rival Sons' "range in performing bluesy rock 'n' roll; with high energy riffs and slow melancholy rhythms, the music offers a variety of emotional tones for listeners to absorb", and concluding that for listeners new to Rival Sons, "Feral Roots is an excellent place to start".

James Christopher Monger of AllMusic has called the track "Do Your Worst" "a radio-ready banger that evokes both Led Zeppelin and the Black Keys." He also points similarities between the track "Look Away" and the album Led Zeppelin III. Loudwire named it one of the 50 best rock albums of 2019.

At the 2020 Grammy Awards, the album was nominated for Best Rock Album, losing to Cage the Elephant's Social Cues. "Too Bad" was nominated for Best Rock Performance, losing to Gary Clark Jr.'s "This Land".

== Track listing ==
All tracks are written by Jay Buchanan and Scott Holiday, except where noted

No.	Title	Length
1.	"Do Your Worst" (Buchanan, Dave Cobb, Holiday)	3:30
2.	"Sugar on the Bone"	3:02
3.	"Back in the Woods"	3:32
4.	"Look Away"	5:19
5.	"Feral Roots"	5:55
6.	"Too Bad"	4:44
7.	"Stood by Me"	4:05
8.	"Imperial Joy"	4:09
9.	"All Directions" (Buchanan, Cobb, Holiday)	4:29
10.	"End of Forever" (Dave Beste, Buchanan, Holiday)	3:52
11.	"Shooting Stars"	4:20
Total length:		46:57

== Personnel ==
=== Rival Sons ===
- Jay Buchanan – vocals, rhythm guitar on tracks 5 and 9
- Scott Holiday – guitars
- Michael Miley – drums
- Dave Beste – bass guitars

=== Additional musicians ===
- Todd Ögren – keyboards on tracks 1–5, 7–11
- Kristen Rogers and Whitney Coleman – backing vocals on tracks 1–3, 5, 7, 8 and 9
- The Nashville Urban Choir – additional vocals on track 11

=== Production ===
- Dave Cobb – producer, mixing, rhythm guitar on tracks 7 and 11
- Eddie Spear – recording engineer
- Gena Johnson and Chris Taylor – recording engineers
- Andrew Scheps – mixing
- Pete Lyman – mastering

=== Additional ===
- Martin Wittfooth – album cover ("Wildmother" painting)
- Mark Obriski – art direction and design
- Steven J. Bradley – photography

Credits adapted from liner notes.

== Charts ==
=== Weekly charts ===
Chart (2019)	Peak position
Austrian Albums (Ö3 Austria)	16
Belgian Albums (Ultratop Flanders)	37
Belgian Albums (Ultratop Wallonia)	18
Dutch Albums (Album Top 100)	79
Finnish Albums (Suomen virallinen lista)	43
French Albums (SNEP)	46
German Albums (Offizielle Top 100)	8
Italian Albums (FIMI)	94
Norwegian Albums (VG-lista)	4
Scottish Albums (OCC)	4
Swedish Albums (Sverigetopplistan)	4
Swiss Albums (Schweizer Hitparade)	7
UK Albums (OCC)	12
UK Rock & Metal Albums (OCC)	2
US Billboard 200	139
US Top Album Sales (Billboard)	13
US Top Hard Rock Albums (Billboard)	6
US Heatseekers Albums (Billboard)	1
US Top Rock Albums (Billboard)	22
US Indie Store Album Sales (Billboard)	5

=== Year-end charts ===
Chart (2019)	Position
Belgian Albums (Ultratop Wallonia)	192
