= Erika Wagenius =

- Born: January 2, 1967 (age 59); Skellefteå, Sweden
- Years active: 1979–

Erika Wagenius also known as Erika Norberg, Erika Malmsteen and Erika Evenlind (born 1967) is a singer, performer, and songwriter in the genres of pop rock, glam metal, and AOR.

== Career ==
Wagenius formed her first band at age 12 in her native Skellefteå, Sweden. As a teenager she relocated to Stockholm where she continued to form, write music and record demos with various rock bands. In 1989 she got an offer for a record deal with Lionheart records. She co- wrote and recorded her debut album Cold winter night with producers and songwriters Bobby Ljunggren, Håkan Almqvist and Jonas Warnerbring in 1990. The album went triple platinum and had a number one- and several top ten hits. This was followed by two sold out tours where several shows had to be cut short due to the crowds forcing through the crush barriers.

Her second album In the arms of a stranger was released in 1991 and also produced several hits and a sold-out tour. Her third album Lady Luck (1993) was her last album on Lionheart records. It contained the hit song Lost in paradise, a duet with Jan Johansen.

In 1997, Wagenius released her fourth album "Planet X" and the first single "Super sonic city" became a massive radio hit in Japan. She released the album "Ripe" in 1999, her second release on DPop records in Japan. That was followed by the compilation "Supertrax" in 2001. Wagenius' first two albums on Lionheart records were re-released and sold out in Germany in the 2000s. Wagenius has appeared on TV and radio shows in Scandinavia, Germany and Japan. She is also a successful songwriter for other performers. Among her wide variety of hits are the runner up in the 1998 Swedish Eurovision, and the English version of the 1995 Swedish Eurovision winner, a Swedish Grammy winner in the Dance category, as well as numerous songs on platinum selling metal albums worldwide].

In 2014 Wagenius began pre- production of her sixth album in Red Door studio in Stockholm with co- producer Alex Angleflod. The album was mixed in Studio 1 at X-Level studios in Stockholm by Willem Bleeker. The album, "Deaf, dumb & blonde" features Swedish musicians and songwriters from bands such as Europe, In Flames and Candlemass, released through Escape Records May 20, 2016.

2019 Wagenius started working with the Swedish guitarist and producer Staffan Österlind (Paul Di'Anno cover of Kashmir), it resulted in the album Remedy For Sobriety, released in 2020. The album was produced, recorded, mixed and mastered by Staffan Österlind who also co-wrote the album together with Wagenius.

The album United States of Erika was released 2024. Wagenius once again worked with the same producer as on the previous album, Staffan Österlind, who produced, mixed and mastered the album. Songwriters involved was Wagenius herself, Jim Wallenborg (Melodifestivalen 2012), Chris Wetterström, Ralf Gyllenhammar (Mustasch) and Erik Henriksson.

== Personal life ==
Wagenius lived with guitarist Yngwie Malmsteen from the late 1980s. The couple jetted between their apartment in Stockholm and Ten Oaks Mansion in Miami Shores, Florida, where Malmsteen still resides. They married in 1991 and divorced in 1992. Wagenius was married to singer/songwriter/producer Richard Evenlind during the second half of the nineties. Wagenius then married Daniel Wagenius but they divorced in 2018.

== Discography ==
=== Singles ===
- "Together We're Lost" (1990)
- "Hurting So Bad" (1990)
- "Heavenly" (1991)
- "Wake Me up When the House Is on Fire" (1991)
- "In the Arms of a Stranger" (1991)
- "Rock Me Into Heaven" (1991)
- "Lost in Paradise" (with Jan Johansen) (1993)
- "Merry-Go-Round" (1993)
- "När Julen Kommer Till Stan" (with Christmas Crackers) (1994)
- "Super Sonic City" (1995)
- "Jimmy Jimmy Jimmy" (1997)
- "Vampire" (1997)
- "Do You" (1998) (only released in Japan)

=== Albums ===
- Cold Winter Night (1990)
- In The Arms Of A Stranger (1991)
- Lady Luck (1993)
- Planet X (1997)
- Ripe (1998) (only released in Japan)
- Super Trax (1998) (only released in Japan)
- Cold Winter Night (2004) (Re-released)
- In The Arms Of A Stranger (2005) (Re-released)
- Deaf, Dumb & Blonde (2016)
- Remedy for Sobriety (2020)
- United States of Erika (2024)

== English translation of references ==
- 3. Cold Winter Night (Google translation)
