= Great Western Valkyrie =

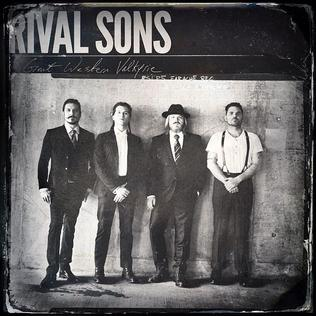

Studio album by Rival Sons
- Released: June 6, 2014
- Studio: Low Country Sound (Nashville, Tennessee)
- Genre: Blues rock, hard rock
- Length: 47:43
- Label: Earache
- Producer: Dave Cobb

Rival Sons chronology
Head Down (2012)	Great Western Valkyrie (2014)	Hollow Bones (2016)

Singles from Great Western Valkyrie
- 1. "Electric Man" Released: April 19, 2014; 2. "Open My Eyes" Released: 2014; 3. "Good Things" Released: 2014

Great Western Valkyrie is the fourth studio album by American rock band Rival Sons. The album, which is the first to feature new bass player Dave Beste (in place of founding member Robin Everhart), was released in June 2014, arriving in Europe on June 6, the United Kingdom on June 9, and the United States on June 10. It garnered positive reviews from critics who praised the band's musicianship in recapturing late 60s hard rock. Great Western Valkyrie peaked within the top 40 of countries like Finland, Norway, Sweden, Switzerland and the UK, and spawned three singles: "Electric Man", "Open My Eyes" and "Good Things". To promote the record, the band toured across Europe and North America with appearances at music festivals and talk shows.

== Promotion ==
On April 14, 2014, the band announced that they planned four tour dates in the UK to promote Great Western Valkyrie on its release date, beginning with London's Scala club and finishing at Manchester's Gorilla club. On October 17, they made their UK television debut performing "Electric Man" on Later... with Jools Holland. On December 17, they announced a 22-city spring 2015 tour in Europe, starting at Leeds Academy in the UK and ending at the Schüür concert hall in Lucerne, Switzerland, with some appearances at music festivals like Monsters of Rock. They followed that up with an 18-city North American tour, beginning with Toronto's Phoenix Concert Theatre and finishing at Vancouver's Commodore Ballroom. On September 10, 2015, they toured with Black Sabbath as one of the opening acts of their farewell The End Tour.

== Critical reception ==
Professional ratings
Review scores
Source	Rating
AllMusic	3.5/5 stars
Classic Rock	10/10 stars
No Ripcord	8/10

Max Bell of Classic Rock critically lauded the album, giving high praise to the band's penchant for "hardcore rock music with clever lyrics, brilliant guitar playing and superb vocals." Carl Purvis of No Ripcord commented on the band's musicianship throughout the record, finding bassist Dave Beste's chemistry with drummer Michael Miley "every bit as conversant as the original pairing", praising the trademark grooves created by guitarist Scott Holiday's "endless conveyor belt of pulverizing riffs" and being impressed by Jay Buchanan's vocal performance for having "the range of Chris Cornell and the soul of Bill Withers." AllMusic's Thom Jurek also praised the musicians for crafting tracks with various aesthetics that are influenced by their "worship of late-'60s psych, blues-rock, and hard rock", concluding that: "Great Western Valkyrie continues to revel in retro-rock, but it does so with fine songwriting, arrangements, and — above all — taste added to the instrumental firepower. Combined, these strengths make this a full step up from Head Down."

== Chart performance ==
Great Western Valkyrie charted within the top 40 of several countries, surpassing what Head Down achieved. The album debuted at numbers three and five in Finland and Norway respectively, ten and nine spots higher than their previous album. It also debuted at numbers 12 and 14 in Switzerland and the UK respectively (whereas their previous record charted at numbers 30 and 31 respectively). However, it fared less better in Austria, the Netherlands and France, entering at numbers 41, 55 and 60 respectively for one week.

== Track listing ==
All lyrics by Jay Buchanan, except "Destination on Course", by Scott Holiday. In parentheses are the songs' subtitles which feature on the back cover of the album sleeve.

No.	Title	Writer(s)	Length
1.	"Electric Man" (Take You to the Sugar Shack)	Holiday; Buchanan; Dave Cobb	3:20
2.	"Good Luck" (It's Going to Hurt Right Now)	Buchanan; Holiday; Michael Miley; Dave Beste	3:18
3.	"Secret" (Just Bring Me a Jar Full of Shine)	Holiday; Buchanan; Miley; Beste; Cobb	4:41
4.	"Play the Fool" (The Way That Girls Talk)	Holiday; Buchanan	3:18
5.	"Good Things" (Boy with a Bomb in His Jacket)	Buchanan	5:56
6.	"Open My Eyes" (Folding Like a Jack Knife)	Holiday; Buchanan; Miley; Beste; Cobb	3:56
7.	"Rich and the Poor" (Her Teeth Bound by Braces)	Buchanan; Cobb	5:15
8.	"Belle Starr" (The Gem Inside Sparkles Yet)	Holiday; Buchanan; Beste; Miley	4:35
9.	"Where I've Been" (The Habit Wasn't Cheap)	Buchanan; Holiday	6:18
10.	"Destination on Course" (Slipped from the Rail)	Holiday; Cobb	7:06
Total length:			47:43

Bonus tracks
No.	Title	Writer(s)	Length
11.	"Too Much Love"		3:45
12.	"My Nature"		4:32
13.	"Torture" (Live in Gothenburg)		6:30
14.	"Wild Animal" (Live in Gothenburg)	Buchanan; Holiday; Robin Everhart; Miley	3:46
15.	"Manifest Destiny, Part 2" (Live in Gothenburg)	Buchanan; Holiday; Everhart; Miley	5:20

== Personnel ==
Rival Sons

- Jay Buchanan — vocals
- Scott Holiday — guitar
- Dave Beste — bass guitar
- Michael Miley — drums

Additional musicians

- Ikey Owens — keyboards
- Mike Webb — keyboards on "Where I've Been"
- Kristen Rogers — backing vocals

Production

- Dave Cobb — production
- John Netti — engineering, mixing
- Pete Lyman — mastering

== Charts ==
Chart (2014)	Peak position
Austrian Albums (Ö3 Austria)	41
Belgian Albums (Ultratop Flanders)	84
Belgian Albums (Ultratop Wallonia)	46
Danish Albums (Hitlisten)	30
Dutch Albums (Album Top 100)	55
Finnish Albums (Suomen virallinen lista)	3
French Albums (SNEP)	60
German Albums (Offizielle Top 100)	24
Norwegian Albums (VG-lista)	5
Scottish Albums (OCC)	11
Swedish Albums (Sverigetopplistan)	10
Swiss Albums (Schweizer Hitparade)	12
UK Albums (OCC)	14
UK Independent Albums (OCC)	3
UK Rock & Metal Albums (OCC)	1
US Billboard 200	125
US Top Album Sales (Billboard)	104
US Heatseekers Albums (Billboard)	1
US Independent Albums (Billboard)	22
US Top Rock Albums (Billboard)	38
