= Maddie & Tae discography =

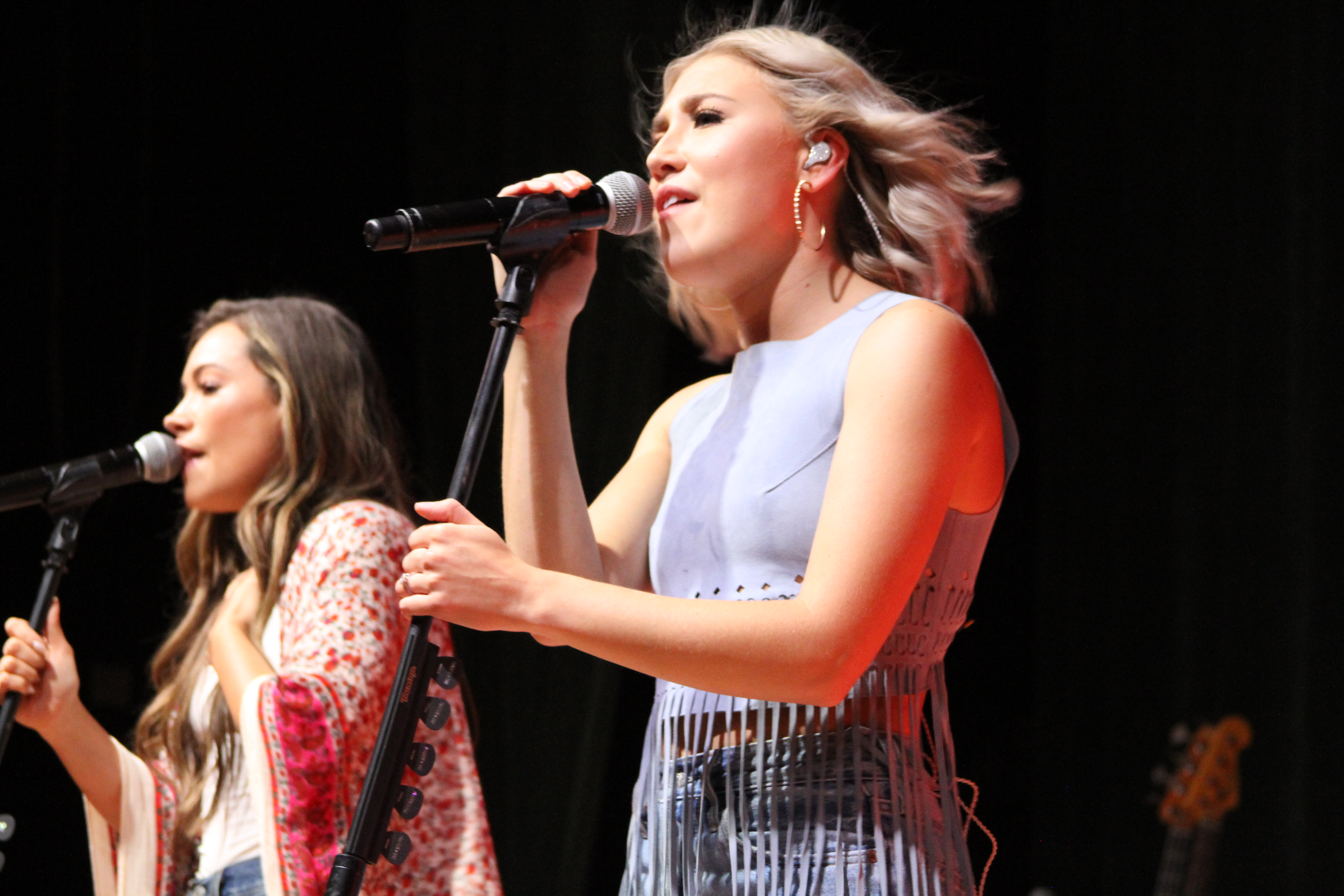
- Maddie & Tae, 2019
- Studio albums: 3
- EPs: 4
- Singles: 8
- Music videos: 5
- Promotional singles: 7
- Other album appearances: 2

American country music duo Maddie & Tae has released three studio albums, five extended plays, seven singles, seven promotional singles, twelve music videos and appeared on two albums. Signing with Dot Records, the label released their debut single in 2014 titled "Girl in a Country Song." The song reached number one on the Billboard Country Airplay chart their self-titled EP was released the same year. In 2015, their debut studio album was released titled Start Here. It spent 40 weeks on the Billboard Top Country Albums and climbed to number two. The album also entered the top ten of the Billboard 200 list. Also in 2015, their single, "Fly" reached the top ten of country charts and was also included on their debut album.

In 2017, Dot Records closed its doors, prompting Maddie & Tae to switch to Mercury Records in 2018. The same year, they released the single, "Friends Don't." The song reached the top 40 of the Billboard country chart by early 2019. Their next release was 2019 EP titled One Heart to Another. It was followed by the single, "Die from a Broken Heart." By summer 2020, the song topped the Billboard country songs list, their first major hit since 2015. The hit was included on the duo's second album, The Way It Feels, which was also released in 2020.

== Studio albums ==
List of studio albums, with selected chart positions and sales, showing other details
Title	Album details	Peak chart positions			Sales	Certifications
Title	Album details	US	US Cou.	CAN	Sales	Certifications
Start Here	Released: August 28, 2015; Format: CD, digital download; Label: Dot	7	2	12	US: 103,800	
The Way It Feels	Released: April 10, 2020; Format: CD, digital download, LP; Label: Mercury Nashville	74	7	—		RIAA: Gold
Love & Light	Released: May 2, 2025; Format: CD, digital download, LP; Label: Mercury Nashville	—	—	—		
"—" denotes a recording that did not chart or was not released in that territory.

== Extended plays ==
List of extended plays, with selected chart positions and sales, showing other details
Title	EP details	Peak chart positions			Sales
Title	EP details	US	US Cou.	US Heat.	Sales
Maddie & Tae	Released: November 4, 2014; Format: Digital download; Label: Dot	164	28	1	US: 12,600
One Heart to Another	Released: April 26, 2019; Format: Digital download; Label: Mercury Nashville	—	—	—	
Everywhere I'm Goin'	Released: October 18, 2019; Format: Digital download; Label: Mercury Nashville	—	—	—	US: 1,100
We Need Christmas (Note: We Need Christmas reached number 34 on the Top Holiday Albums sales chart.)	Released: October 23, 2020; Format: Digital download; Label: Mercury Nashville	—	—	—	
Through the Madness, Vol. 1	Released: January 28, 2022; Formats: CD, digital download; Label: Mercury Nashville	—	—	—	
Through the Madness, Vol. 2	Released: September 23, 2022; Formats: CD, digital download; Label: Mercury Nashville	—	—	—	
What a Woman Can Do	Released: September 13, 2024; Formats: Digital download; Label: Mercury Nashville	—	—	—	
"—" denotes a recording that did not chart or was not released in that territory.

== Singles ==
=== As lead artist ===
List of singles, with selected chart positions and certifications, showing other relevant details
Title	Year	Peak chart positions					Certifications	Sales	Album
Title	Year	US	US Cou.	US Cou. Air.	CAN	CAN Cou.	Certifications	Sales	Album
"Girl in a Country Song"	2014	54	3	1	61	5	RIAA: Platinum	US: 667,000	Start Here
"Fly"	2015	61	9	9	66	18	RIAA: Platinum	US: 321,000	Start Here
"Shut Up and Fish"	2015	—	30	23	—	36			Start Here
"Sierra"	2016	—	—	47	—	—			Start Here
"Friends Don't"	2018	—	39	33	—	—	RIAA: Platinum		The Way It Feels
"Die from a Broken Heart"	2019	22	2	1	69	8	RIAA: 4× Platinum		The Way It Feels
"Woman You Got"	2021	—	—	53	—	—			Through the Madness, Vol. 1
"Heart They Didn't Break"	2023	—	—	—	—	—			What a Woman Can Do
"—" denotes a recording that did not chart or was not released in that territory.

=== Promotional singles ===
List of promotional singles, showing all relevant details
Title	Year	Peak chart positions	Album	Ref.
Title	Year	US Country	Album	Ref.
"Your Side of Town"	2015	—	Start Here	
"Downside of Growing Up"	2015	—	Start Here	
"Meet in the Middle"	2019	—	—N/a	
"Tourist in This Town"	2019	—	The Way It Feels	
"Everywhere I'm Goin'"	2019	—	The Way It Feels	
"Bathroom Floor"	2019	—	The Way It Feels	
"Have Yourself a Merry Little Christmas"	2019	—	—N/a	
"Mood Ring"	2021	—	—N/a	
"Life Ain't Fair"	2021	—	—N/a	
"Madness"	2021	—	Through the Madness	
"Strangers"	2022	50	Through the Madness	
"Sad Girl Summer"	2024	—	What a Woman Can Do	
"Free Like"	2024	—	What a Woman Can Do	
"—" denotes a recording that did not chart or was not released in that territory.

== Other charted songs ==
List of other charted songs, with selected chart positions, showing other relevant details
Title	Year	Peak chart positions	Album
Title	Year	CAN Cou.	Album
"It's Beginning to Look a Lot Like Christmas"	2024	58	We Need Christmas

== Music videos ==
List of music videos, showing year released and director
Title	Year	Director(s)	Ref.
"Girl in a Country Song"	2014	TK McKamy	
"Fly"	2015	Brian Lazzaro	
"Shut Up and Fish"	2015	TK McKamy	
"Friends Don't"	2018	TK McKamy	
"Die from a Broken Heart"	2019	Carlos Ruiz	
"Bathroom Floor"	2019	Carlos Ruiz	
"Have Yourself A Merry Little Christmas"	2019	Sandra Wallbank	
"Woman You Got"	2021	TK McKamy	
"We Need Christmas"	2023	William Hamilton	
"Free Like"	2024	Lewis Cater	
"Chasing Babies & Raising Dreams"	2025	Lewis Cater	

== Other album appearances ==
List of non-single guest appearances, with other performing artists, showing year released and album name
Title	Year	Other artist(s)	Album	Ref(s).
"People Need People"	2019	—N/a	Breakthrough (soundtrack)	
"Desperately"	2020	Josh Turner	Country State of Mind	
"Last Time Last"	2023	Tenille Arts	To Be Honest	
"I Do"	2024	Andy Grammer	Monster	
