= Maddie & Tae (EP) =

EP by Maddie & Tae
- Released: November 4, 2014
- Studio: Blackbird (Nashville, Tennessee)
- Genre: Country
- Length: 13:05
- Label: Dot
- Producer: Dann Huff, Aaron Scherz

Maddie & Tae chronology
Maddie & Tae (2014)	Start Here (2015)

Singles from Maddie & Tae
- 1. "Girl in a Country Song" Released: July 15, 2014; 2. "Fly" Released: January 25, 2015

Maddie & Tae is the debut EP from American country music duo Maddie & Tae. It was released on November 4, 2014, and is the first work produced by Dot Records. The duo, composed of Madison Marlow and Taylor Dye, co-wrote all four tracks, and it was recorded at Blackbird Studio.

== Track listing ==
No.	Title	Writer(s)	Length
1.	"Girl in a Country Song"	Taylor Dye; Madison Marlow; Aaron Scherz	3:39
2.	"Sierra"	Dye; Marlow; Scherz	2:45
3.	"Fly"	Dye; Marlow; Scherz; Vartanyan	3:37
4.	"Your Side of Town"	Dye; Marlow; Blair Daly; Heather Morgan	3:04
Total length:			13:05

== Chart performance ==
The album has sold 12,600 copies in the US as of March 2015.

Chart (2014)	Peak position
US Billboard 200	164
US Top Country Albums (Billboard)	28
US Heatseekers Albums (Billboard)	1
