= Die from a Broken Heart =

2019 single by Maddie & Tae

Single by Maddie & Tae

from the album The Way It Feels
- Released: May 6, 2019
- Genre: Country
- Length: 3:08
- Label: Mercury Nashville
- Songwriters: Taylor Dye; Maddie Marlow; Deric Ruttan; Jonathan Singleton
- Producers: Jimmy Robbins; Derek Wells

Maddie & Tae singles chronology
| "Friends Don't" (2018) | "Die from a Broken Heart" (2019) | "Woman You Got" (2021) |

"Die from a Broken Heart" is a song co-written and recorded by American country music duo Maddie & Tae. It was released on May 6, 2019, as the second single from their second studio album The Way It Feels.

== Content ==
"Die from a Broken Heart" was co-written by both members of Maddie & Tae alongside Deric Ruttan and Jonathan Singleton. The song's lyrics deal with its female protagonist dealing with heartbreak by way of a phone call home to her mother seeking advice and comfort following a breakup, asking "Mama, can you die from a broken heart?" The duo said that Singleton came up with the song's title and they felt like it related to where the girls were at in their lives. Marlow said that "personally, I was like 'I feel that way right now.' That sounds like a phone conversation between me and my mom. Sometimes you're in so much pain and your heart hurts so bad that you just don't know if you're going to come out of it. We just wanted to capture what that phone call's like."

== Music video ==
The music video for "Die from a Broken Heart" was directed by Carlos Ruiz and premiered on August 12, 2019. In it, Dye takes the role of acting out the storyline in the song and Marlow is the musical narrator. Dye channeled her own experience with heartbreak following her previous breakup with country artist Jackie Lee, saying that this video was her acting debut: "I actually am very passionate about acting. I've always had a little bit of an itch for it. We wrote the song from such a personal space that I felt like I could really draw from that. And if this was to be my 'acting debut,' if you will, then this would be the perfect story to tell."

== Chart performance ==
"Die from a Broken Heart" debuted at number 80 on the Billboard Hot 100 chart dated April 25, 2020, making it Maddie & Tae's first appearance on the chart since 2015's "Fly". The song has since peaked at number 22 becoming the duo's first top 40 hit and their highest-charting song on the chart. It has also become the duo's second number one single on the Billboard Country Airplay chart, and their first since their debut single, "Girl in a Country Song", in December 2014.

The song was certified 4× Platinum by the RIAA on May 2, 2025.

== Track listing ==
Acoustic version

1. "Die from a Broken Heart" (acoustic version) – 3:23

Dave Aude remix

1. "Die from a Broken Heart" (Dave Aude remix) – 3:07

== Charts ==
=== Weekly charts ===
Weekly chart performance for "Die from a Broken Heart"
| Chart (2019–2020) | Peak position |
|---|---|
| Canada Hot 100 (Billboard) | 69 |
| Canada Country (Billboard) | 8 |
| Global 200 (Billboard) | 162 |
| US Billboard Hot 100 | 22 |
| US Country Airplay (Billboard) | 1 |
| US Hot Country Songs (Billboard) | 2 |
| US Rolling Stone Top 100 | 29 |

=== Year-end charts ===
2019 year-end chart performance for "Die from a Broken Heart"
| Chart (2019) | Position |
|---|---|
| US Hot Country Songs (Billboard) | 97 |

2020 year-end chart performance for "Die from a Broken Heart"
| Chart (2020) | Position |
|---|---|
| US Billboard Hot 100 | 65 |
| US Country Airplay (Billboard) | 5 |
| US Hot Country Songs (Billboard) | 8 |

== Certifications ==
Sales and certifications for "Die from a Broken Heart"
| Region | Certification | Certified units/sales |
|---|---|---|
| United States (RIAA) | 4× Platinum | 4,000,000^{‡} |
^{‡} Sales+streaming figures based on certification alone.

== Release history ==
| Region | Date | Format | Label |
|---|---|---|---|
| United States | October 19, 2018 | Digital download | Mercury Nashville |
| United States | May 6, 2019 | Country radio | Mercury Nashville |
