= Nikki Lane =

American country music singer-songwriter

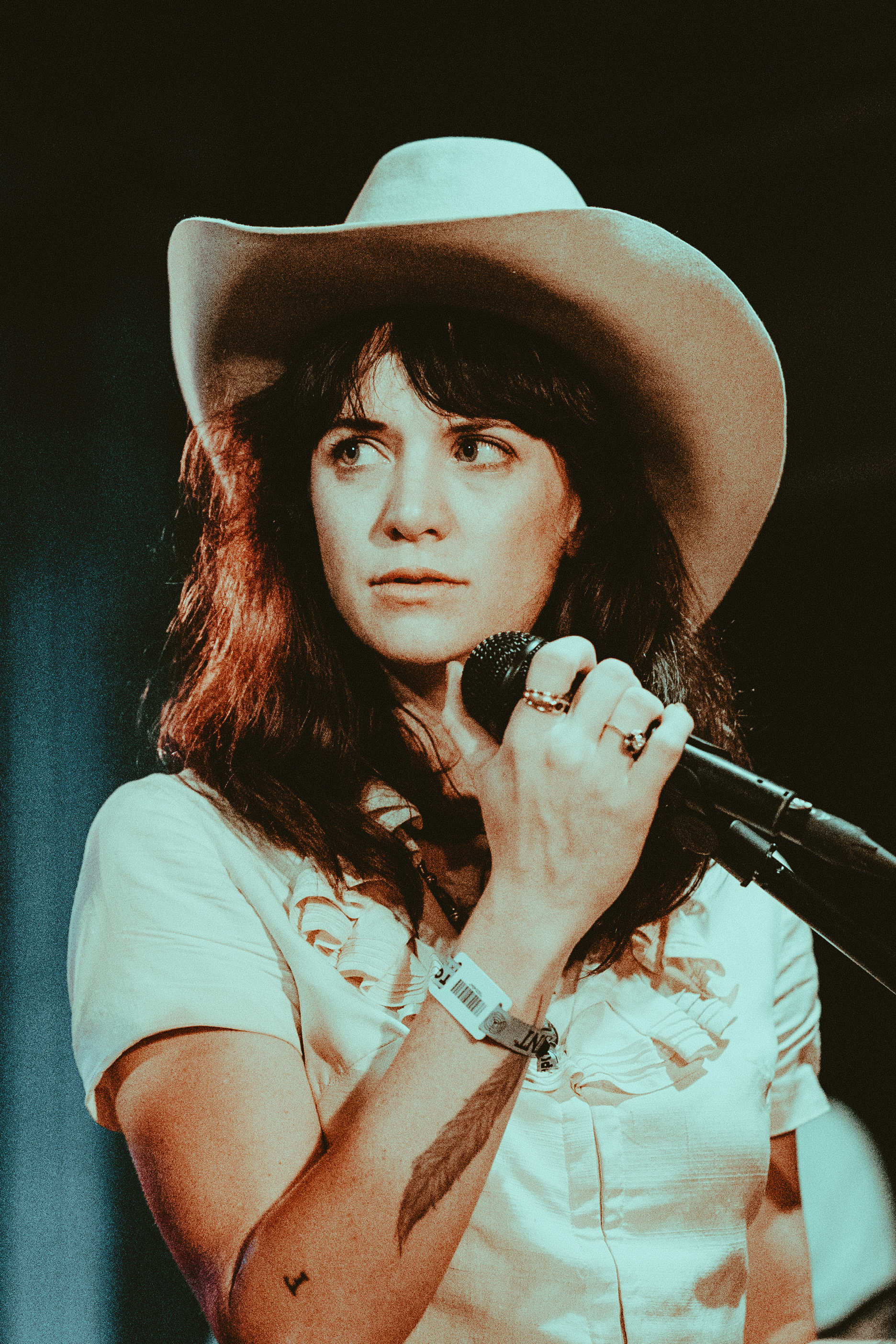
- Nikki Lane Performing with The Texas Gentlemen at Dan's Silverleaf at Oaktopia Festival in Denton, TX.

Background information
- Also known as: The Highway Queen
- Born: Nicole Lane Frady; October 17, 1983 (age 43); Greenville, South Carolina, U.S.
- Genres: Outlaw country; Americana
- Years active: 2010-present
- Labels: Iamsound; New West
- Website: www.nikkilane.com

Nikki Lane (born October 17, 1983) is an American country music singer-songwriter and artist. She has released four albums: Walk of Shame, All or Nothin', Highway Queen, and Denim & Diamonds.

== Early life and education ==
Lane was born in Greenville, South Carolina, and dropped out of high school there. She then worked as a fashion designer, before moving to Los Angeles in 2006 and later to New York City. After doing so, she broke up with a country musician, who left her to record an album in Alabama. This experience inspired her to begin writing country music songs.

== Career ==
On September 27, 2011, Lane released her debut album, Walk of Shame, on Iamsound Records. She co-wrote 'Gone, Gone, Gone' with producer Lewis Pesacov of Fool's Gold. Her second album, All or Nothin', was released on New West Records on May 6, 2014. It was produced by Dan Auerbach of the Black Keys, whom she met at a flea market. Auerbach allowed Lane to record the album at his studio, Easy Eye Sound Studio, for free. Lane has said that working with Auerbach in the making of this album was very easy and natural for her. All or Nothin' features a duet between Lane and Auerbach, "Love's on Fire".

In 2017, Lane recorded a duet with comedian and musician Ben Hoffman, better known by his raunchy country artist persona Wheeler Walker, Jr., for the song "Fuckin' Around" on his sophomore album Ol' Wheeler. She is credited as "Kacey Walker".

Lane's album Highway Queen was released on February 17, 2017. It was recorded near Dallas, TX at The Echo Lab from February to June 2016 with Lane's boyfriend Jonathan Tyler, as well as the other members of her touring band. Two music videos were released ahead of the album's release; the title track, "Highway Queen", in which Lane and friends crush cars with a monster truck, and Jackpot, in which Lane and Tyler successfully try their luck in old Sin City, ultimately resulting in a Vegas chapel wedding.

In another notable video released in August 2017 for the song "Send The Sun" Nikki and the band play live on a vintage country television studio set accompanied by big-haired blonde-and-vacant back-up singers and a youthful but very skilled (twin brother and sister?) dance routine.

Unfortunate circumstances struck Nikki's band around the time of recording Highway Queen, when lead guitarist Alex Munos was sidelined by cancer and started receiving treatment in May 2016. He would later recover and return to the band around the time of Highway Queen's release.

In July 2017 former drummer Ben Eyestone died from colon cancer. He had played drums on Nikki Lane's first two albums.

In 2021 Nikki co-wrote and performed "Breaking Up Slowly" on the Lana Del Rey album Chemtrails Over the Country Club.

In 2022, she performs "Never Git Drunk No More" with Ken Casey on the Dropkick Murphys album This Machine Still Kills Fascists. The album is based on never-used-before texts written by Woody Guthrie. In September 2022, she released her fourth album entitled Denim and Diamonds, which features Josh Homme from the band Queens of the Stone Age on guitar and drums. Homme also produced, mixed, and co-engineered the record.

Lane, who now lives in Nashville, also owns and operates a clothing store called High Class Hillbilly.

== Critical reception ==
Lane's sound has been compared to that of Wanda Jackson, as well as the sound of Neko Case's early albums. She has also been referred to as the First Lady of Outlaw Country.

=== Walk of Shame ===
A review of Walk of Shame in Exclaim! stated that Lane has "a petulant, Valley of the Dolls lyrical style" and praised her vocal delivery. Another review of this album was written by Mark Deming, who said that "Lane has confidence to spare and a voice that lives up to her own self-worth" and gave the album 3.5 out of 5 stars. Deming also said that Lane has yet to fully master the art of recording music in a studio.

=== All or Nothin' ===
According to review aggregator Metacritic, All or Nothin' has received generally favorable reviews from critics, with a score of 79 out of 100. Holly Gleason, writing in Paste, awarded it a score of 8.5 out of 10 and said that the album's songs "read like Polaroids from a wild heart gone ragged". Gleason also praised Auerbach's production, which she called "savvy". Lane told Billboard that she was flattered at the positive reception this album had received from the press.

== Discography ==
=== Studio albums ===
Title	Album details	Peak chart positions			Sales
Title	Album details	US Heat	US Country	US Folk	Sales
Walk of Shame	Release date: September 27, 2011; Label: IAMSOUND Records; Formats: CD, digital download, vinyl	—	—	—	
All or Nothin'	Release date: May 6, 2014; Label: New West Records; Formats: CD, digital download, vinyl	32	—	—	
Highway Queen	Release date: February 17, 2017; Label: New West Records; Formats: CD, cassette, digital download, vinyl	2	41	14	US: 8,300
Denim & Diamonds	Release date: September 23, 2022; Label: New West Records; Formats: CD, digital download, vinyl	13	—	—	
"—" denotes releases that did not chart

=== EPs ===
- Gone, Gone, Gone (2011)

=== Singles ===
List of singles, showing year released and album name
Title	Year	Peak chart positions	Album
Title	Year	US AAA	Album
"Gone Gone Gone"	2012	—	Walk of Shame
"Right Time"	2014	25	All or Nothin'
"Highway Queen"	2016	—	Highway Queen
"Jackpot"	2017	24	Highway Queen
"Wait Till After Christmas" (feat. Joseph Bradshaw)	2017	—	Non-album single
"First High"	2022	10	Denim & Diamonds
"Black Widow"	2022	—	Denim & Diamonds
"Born Tough"	2022	—	Denim & Diamonds
"Denim & Diamonds"	2022	23	Denim & Diamonds
"Easy Street"	2026	—	Non-album single

== Awards and nominations ==
Year	Association	Category	Nominated work	Result
2015	Americana Music Association	Emerging Artist of the Year	Nikki Lane	Nominated
2017	Ameripolitan Music Awards	Outlaw Country Female	Nikki Lane	Won
