= Silo High School =

Public high school in Silo, Oklahoma, United States

Coordinates: 34.005997°N 96.380997°W

Location
- 122 West Bourne St; Durant, Oklahoma 74701; United States

Information
- School type: Public high school
- Staff: 19.28 (FTE)
- Grades: 9-12
- Enrollment: 275 (2023-2024)
- Student to teacher ratio: 14.26
- Colors: Red and blue
- Mascot: Silo Rebel
- Website: www.siloisd.org

Silo High School is a high school in Silo, Oklahoma. It serves 9th through 12th grade. The athletic teams are known as the Rebels. The school colors are red and blue. As of 2017, there are currently 230 students enrolled. The Rebel baseball team currently has four Fall State Championships 2006, 2007, 2010, and 2014. Also having seven Spring State Championships from 2002, 2005, 2008, 2009, 2010, 2015, and 2017. The school district passed a bond in 2017 to allow a new elementary building to be built.

== Academics ==
Some of the elective classes are athletics, Spanish and Choctaw languages, Keyboarding and Computer Applications I and II, Personal Financial Literacy, Current Events, Family and Consumer Sciences, ACT Prep, Web Design, Intro To Computers, Desktop Publishing, AG Education I and II, AG Education Power and Technology, Animal Sciences, AG Communication, Music Appreciation, Music Theory, Drama, Art, and Competitive Academics. Other offered courses are, Pre AP Biology, Environmental Science, Trigonometry, and Algebra III. Silo encourages students to take concurrent classes at the local colleges. This will count as dual credit for high school and college.

== Organizations ==
Some of the organizations are FCCLA, FCA, BETA, and FFA.

== Athletics ==
There is baseball, basketball, cheerleading, cross country, golf, track & field, softball. The 2014 Lady Rebel softball team was the first Silo softball team to make it to the state tournament. The 2017 softball team was the first team to make it to the finals of the state tournament. Baseball has a total of 11 state championship titles. The golf team has taken part in the 2014 state tournament and players have individually taken places in it as well. The Silo High School cheer squad competed in the first ever State Game Day competition in 2017 and placed in the top 6 teams. A new weight training and conditioning class was added for both girls and boys.

== Demographics ==
The student to teacher ratio is 11.5:1. The campus is a facility with school buses..

== Famous alumni ==
Recently, a few Silo High School student have risen to National and or International fame, while a few have managed to become regional celebrities. This includes Dave Hilton (1995), a.k.a. "Big Dave" who became a Radio DJ and has worked at KLBC-FM in Durant, OK, KSSU-FM in Durant, OK, KLAK in Mckinney, KTRX-FM in Ardmore, OK, KYNZ-FM in Ardmore, OK, KKAJ-FM in Ardmore, KVSO-AM in Ardmore, OK, KMKT-FM in Sherman and KMAD-FM (known as Mad Rock 102.5) in Sherman, TX. Another Silo High School student, Mason Dye, is an actor known for a role on the Teen Wolf TV series and starring in the movie, Flowers In The Attic. Mason's sister, Taylor Dye, has become a country singer. She sings in a duo with Maddie Marlow, they are known as Maddie and Tae. In 2015, the duo won the Music Association Awards video of the year award. Keach Ballard played baseball for the Rebels and later moved on to play in the minors. Billy Jack Bowen played in MLB and now coaches at Silo. He was inducted to the Southeastern Oklahoma State Athletics Hall of Fame in 2010.
