= Bro-country =

Subgenre of country music

- Stylistic origins: Country pop; R&B; hard rock; electronica; hip hop
- Cultural origins: Early 2010s, Southern United States
- Typical instruments: Vocals; guitar; drums; drum machines; bass guitar; keyboard; electric guitar; banjo

Other topics
- Country rap; country rock

Bro-country is a form of country pop originating in the 2010s, and is influenced by 21st-century hip hop, hard rock, and electronica. Bro-country songs are often musically upbeat with lyrics about attractive young women, the consumption of alcohol, partying, blue jeans, boots, and pickup trucks.

The first use of the term was by Jody Rosen of New York magazine in an article published on August 11, 2013, in which Rosen described songs by Florida Georgia Line, particularly their debut single "Cruise". Rosen also named Luke Bryan, Jason Aldean, and Jake Owen among singers of the genre. Entertainment Weekly cited "Boys 'Round Here" by Blake Shelton and "Ready Set Roll" by Chase Rice as other examples of bro-country. The popularity of the genre opened up a divide between the older generation of country singers and contemporary artists with a more traditional-leaning sound, and the bro-country singers which was described as "civil war" by musicians, critics and journalists.

== Popularity ==
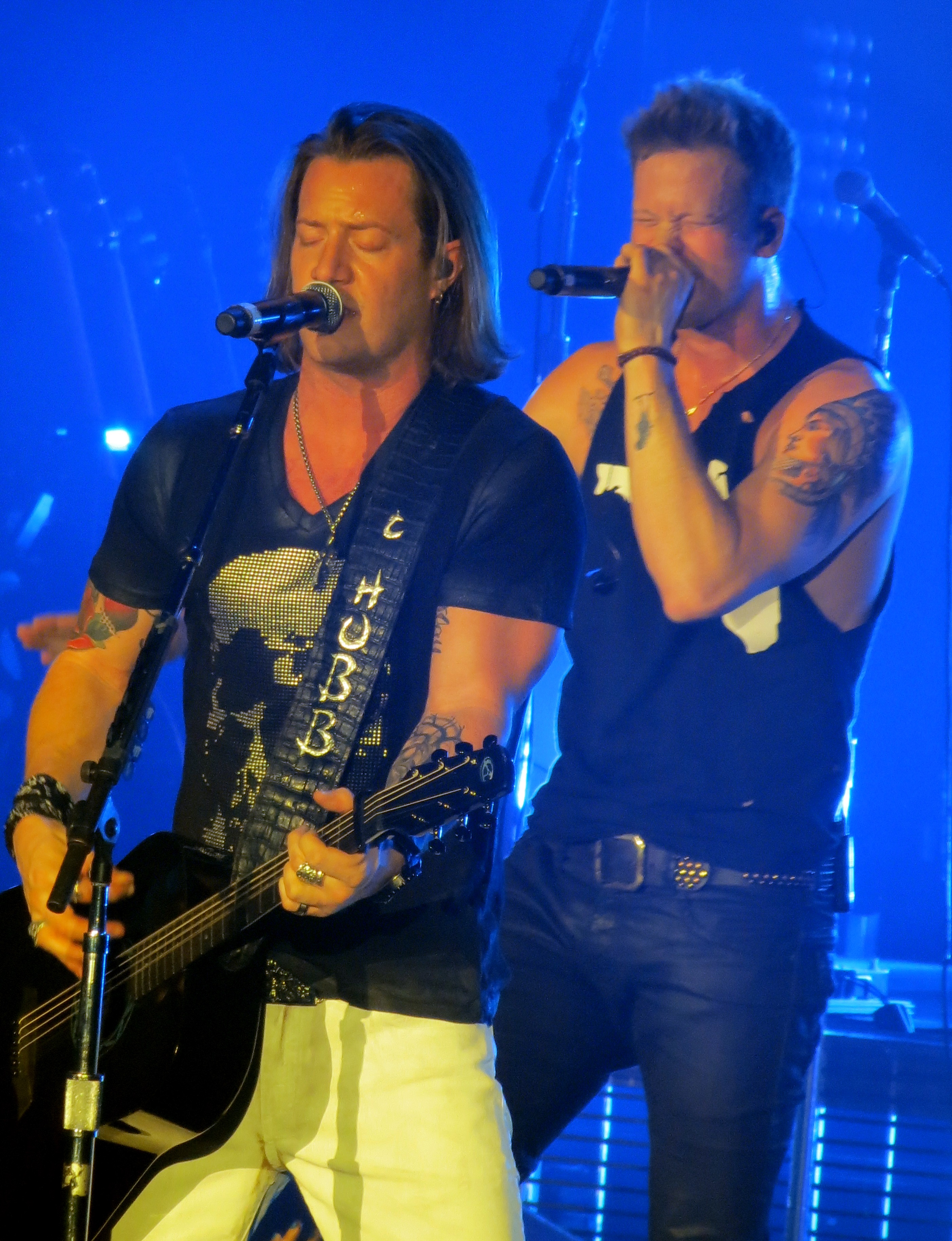
Florida Georgia Line whose hit song "Cruise" drew attention to the subgenre

Although elements of bro-country had been noted prior, such as in the Trace Adkins hit "Honky Tonk Badonkadonk", the genre began to gather steam in the early 2010s. The song that brought the movement to the attention of music journalists was the 2012 Florida Georgia Line song "Cruise". In 2014, "Cruise" became the best-selling digital country song of all time, with over 7 million copies sold in the US while also holding a then-record 24 weeks as the No. 1 Hot Country Song. According to Jody Rosen: "We may look back on 'Cruise' as a turning point, the moment when the balance of power tipped from an older generation of male country stars to the bros."

A number of highly popular albums and songs by singers such as Jason Aldean, Luke Bryan and Blake Shelton considered to be bro-country appeared in the first half of the 2010s. In 2013, Luke Bryan's Crash My Party was the third best-selling of all albums in the US, with Florida Georgia Line's Here's to the Good Times at sixth and Blake Shelton's Based on a True Story at ninth. It has also been estimated in research in mid-2010s that about 45 percent of country's best-selling songs could be considered bro-country, with the top two artists being Luke Bryan and Florida Georgia Line.

While bro-country was popular with country music fans, programmers and those within the industry grew weary of the genre. According to radio programmer R.J. Curtis: "The real fatigue on it has been with [radio] programmers and the people who have to listen to it a lot and evaluate it—the air personalities and the program directors. The people who aren't really sick of it are the listeners." Some thought that the genre had waned by 2015; others, however, felt that the genre remained popular and argued that it had expanded in a positive way. According to radio program director Phathead: "The hip-hop, rock and R&B influence you hear in Sam Hunt, Thomas Rhett, Brett Eldredge, Cole Swindell and all the others is about to take us to new places, and it's awesome."

== Reception ==
The bro-country movement has been criticized by listeners and music reviewers for its repetitive subject matter, namely lyrical themes of partying associated with Friday nights, alcoholic beverages, euphemistic references to sex, and trucks, as well as its lack of female country artists. Traditional country fans and artists have expressed the sentiment that bro-country music is a poor representation of country music. One critic who spoke favorably about bro-country was David Horsey of the Los Angeles Times, who wrote: "But this music has an appeal not unlike the teen surfing songs of the Beach Boys or the screaming guitar, take-everything-too-far anthems of Bon Jovi and Sammy Hagar... For a young man, the allure of reckless freedom is forever strong. And it's not just young men. I know I've got a 25-year-old bottled up inside my decidedly not young self who still longs for the fantasy."

The genre was also criticized for being formulaic. Throughout 2014, radio station KTCK had a regular segment called "Fun With Country Music" hosted by Corby Davidson, criticizing the new form of country music, and produced a checklist of specific items that would be found in these songs: boots, alcohol, jeans, trucks, guns, farm equipment, the word "girl", and rural settings. A video by Greg Todd, an aspiring songwriter, which highlighted the similarities between bro-country songs went viral after being featured by Time in January 2015. The video combined six songs released between 2012 and 2014: Shelton's "Sure Be Cool If You Did", Bryan's "Drunk on You", Florida Georgia Line's "This Is How We Roll", Cole Swindell's "Chillin' It", Parmalee's "Close Your Eyes" and Chase Rice's "Ready Set Roll". Todd noted the formula as "a tight, mid-tempo backbeat; a quick, two-verse set-up, often laced with clever wordplay and bouncy, lyrical melody; and—bam—the power chorus to bring it all home and keep them coming back."

In addition, some also criticized the music's portrayal of women. In November 2014, country artist Kenny Chesney, interviewed by Billboard, opined about bro-country: "over the last several years, it seems like anytime anybody sings about a woman, she's in cutoff jeans, drinking and on a tailgate ... they objectify the hell out of them."

In December 2014, Brad Paisley spoke out against bro-country and the lack of women on country radio: "one of my frustrations with radio now is lyrics: [...] there's a lot of stuff on the radio about, you know, put your tan legs on the dashboard and we'll roll around in the truck and go party. It's like, 'Guys, come on!' – and specifically, yes, guys, 'cause there are no girls! We can say something, too. There are phrases that are totally cliché that we as songwriters owe it to ourselves to not use again."

In 2017, Steve Earle noted that the genre was, in some ways, a watered-down form of hip hop, stating that "The guys just wanna sing about getting fucked up. They're just doing hip-hop for people who are afraid of black people. I like the new Kendrick Lamar record, so I'll just listen to that."

=== Response ===
In response to the criticisms, Blake Shelton said in January 2013 that he did not care about the "old farts" who complained about their songs: "Well that's because you don't buy records anymore, jackass. The kids do, and they don't want to buy the music you were buying." In turn, that sparked a response from Ray Price via his Facebook page: "It's a shame that I have spend [sic] 63 years in this business trying to introduce music to a larger audience and to make it easier for the younger artists who are coming behind me... You should be so lucky as us old-timers. Check back in 63 years (the year 2075) and let us know how your music will be remembered." Shelton later apologized to Price.

Zac Brown described Luke Bryan's "That's My Kind of Night" as the worst song he had ever heard, to which Jason Aldean replied, "nobody gives a shit what u think." Aldean also called the term bro-country ridiculous and was bothered to be labeled as such because he did not "feel like it's a compliment," that "it's sort of a backhanded thing that comes from a very narrow-minded listener". On his song about drinking and trucks, he said: "Yeah, we've had some songs that talk about that stuff. But that's also what we really grew up doing. A lot of us grew up in these little towns where there wasn't a whole lot to do, and we were entertaining ourselves. I can't sing you a song about being a stockbroker on Wall Street, because I don't even know where the hell Wall Street's at."

Rosen himself was unhappy the way the term bro-country had been used by some as an insult and felt that some criticisms of the genre came from class and regional prejudices and snobbery. He thought that artists such as Jake Owen and Thomas Rhett made music that pushed the genre into "exciting new territory" and said: "All the ways country is flirting with R&B and hip hop, production-wise and otherwise, I think it's really cool." To Rosen, bro-country has changed country in a positive way, producing an increasing diversity of sound and subject matter on country radio.

== Reactions in music ==
A number of country singers expressed their criticism of the genre in their songs. In July 2014, female duo Maddie & Tae released their debut single, "Girl in a Country Song", which criticized and referenced many bro-country songs, particularly the roles of women within such songs. However, in the same month, country singer-songwriter Maggie Rose released her single "Girl in Your Truck Song". In the song she praises bro-country songs, saying she actually wants to be the girl in their songs.

In August 2014, country artist Brad Paisley recorded a song called "4WP" for his album Moonshine in the Trunk. In the song, Paisley pokes fun at bro-country by joining the trend and heavily relying on some of its recurrent elements. A sample of Paisley's hit single "Mud on the Tires" is also featured in the song. About the song, Paisley said: "In the middle of this bro-country movement, with all this criticism about [the genre's reliance on] the jean shorts and the mud and the outdoors, we do a song that's just like that... but we include a sample of myself from 2003! Which is kind of like saying, 'I have a little license. I kinda did this already'. But it's written so tongue-in-cheek, and it doesn't take itself too seriously."

On October 15, 2014, Canadian country music artist Paul Brandt released the song "Get a Bed" as a comedic response to the bro-country phenomenon.

In April 2015, songwriter Brent Cobb, who has written cuts by Miranda Lambert, Little Big Town, Frankie Ballard and Luke Bryan, released a song called "Yo Bro" which mocks and pokes fun at all of bro-country's clichés stating that it was "inspired by frustration".

In 2016, comedian and musician Ben Hoffman released his first country album, Redneck Shit, under the stage name Wheeler Walker, Jr., finding success satirizing stereotypical modern country music tropes with raunchy themes and lyrics. Hoffman has used the character's success to vocalize his displeasure with the modern Nashville music scene, specifically the bro-country subgenre.

In 2016, Bo Burnham's song "Country Song (Pandering)" parodied bro-country themes.

In 2023, musical project There I Ruined It released the song "Gotta Beer in My Beer: A Tribute to Bro Country" on YouTube and Spotify as a comedic take on the subjects commonly used in bro-country.

== See also ==
- Truck-driving country, an earlier subgenre centered on heavy commercial trucks (as opposed to pickup trucks)
