= Denim & Diamonds =

Studio album by Nikki Lane
- Released: September 23, 2022
- Studio: Pink Duck Studios, Burbank, California
- Genre: Country
- Length: 33:10
- Label: New West
- Producer: Joshua Homme

Nikki Lane chronology
Highway Queen (2017)	Denim & Diamonds (2022)

Singles from Denim & Diamonds
- 1. "First High" Released: June 2, 2022

Professional ratings
Aggregate scores
Source	Rating
Metacritic	81/100
Review scores
Source	Rating
AllMusic	4.5/5 stars
American Songwriter	3.5/5 stars
Classic Rock	4/5 stars
The Line of Best Fit	8/10
Pitchfork	7.2/10

Denim & Diamonds is the fourth studio album by American country musician Nikki Lane. It was released on September 23, 2022, by New West Records.

== Background ==
On June 2, 2022, Nikkie Lane announced she was releasing her fourth studio album, with Queens of the Stone Age founder Josh Homme as the producer and mixer. Along with the announcement, Lane released the first single "First High".

== Critical reception ==
Denim & Diamonds was met with "universal acclaim" reviews from critics. At Metacritic, which assigns a weighted average rating out of 100 to reviews from mainstream publications, this release received an average score of 81, based on 7 reviews.

Writing for American Songwriter, Hal Horwitz explained the release "shows Nikki Lane at her best, stepping towards a darker direction while keeping one foot planted in the country and roots music of her past." Allison Hussey of Pitchfork wrote, "the songwriter's fourth album attempts to subvert the should-bes of a woman making a country record."

== Track listing ==
Denim & Diamonds track listing
No.	Title	Writer(s)	Length
1.	"First High"	Nikki Lane; Gabe Simon	3:07
2.	"Denim & Diamonds"	Lane; Simon	3:12
3.	"Faded"	Lane; Simon; Alain Moschulski	2:48
4.	"Born Tough"	Lane	3:51
5.	"Try Harder"	Lane; Joshua Homme	3:06
6.	"Good Enough"	Lane	5:21
7.	"Live/Love"	Lane	2:31
8.	"Black Widow"	Lane; Simon	2:50
9.	"Pass It Down"	Lane; Simon	3:03
10.	"Chimayo"	Lane; Simon	3:10

== Personnel ==
Musicians

- Nikki Lane – primary artist
- Alain Moschulski – guitar
- Carla Azar – drums
- Matt Helders - drums
- Daphne Chen – violin
- Dean Fertita – organ
- Erika Orbison – vocals
- Gabe Simon – vocals
- Joshua Homme – drums, guitar, keyboard
- Leah Katz –violin
- Matt Pynn – guitar
- Pearl Charles – guitar

Production

- Joshua Homme – engineer, mixer, producer
- Robert Adam Stevenson – engineer, mastering, mixing

== Charts ==
Chart performance for Denim & Diamonds
Chart (2022)	Peak position
UK Americana Albums (Official Charts)	12
US Heatseekers Albums (Billboard)	13
