= All or Nothin' (Nikki Lane album) =

Studio album by Nikki Lane
- Released: May 6, 2014
- Studio: Easy Eye Sound (Nashville)
- Genre: Country
- Length: 42:35
- Label: New West
- Producer: Dan Auerbach

Nikki Lane chronology
Walk of Shame (2011)	All or Nothin' (2014)	Highway Queen (2017)

All or Nothin' is the second studio album by American outlaw country singer Nikki Lane. It was released on May 6, 2014 on New West Records.

== Background and recording ==
Lane recorded the album with producer Dan Auerbach, the frontman of the Black Keys, at his Easy Eye Sound recording studio in Nashville. Auerbach and Lane perform together on the album, in the duet "Love's on Fire". Lane co-wrote all 12 of the album's tracks and producer Auerbach co-wrote 5.

== Critical reception ==
According to Metacritic, All or Nothin' has a score of 79 out of 100, indicating generally favorable reviews from critics. Thom Jurek reviewed the album for AllMusic and gave it 3.5 stars out of 5, writing that "Lane's songs and delivery are strong throughout All or Nothin'" and that on the album, "her vocals and arrangements co-exist to wed past to present both simultaneously and effortlessly."

Chris Richards, writing for the Washington Post, compared the album's sound to Wanda Jackson, Mazzy Star, and Link Wray. Jurek compared the album's song "Good Man" to the music of Lucinda Williams, who Lane has acknowledged is one of her major influences. Holly Gleason compared All or Nothin' to the music of Dusty Springfield, Loretta Lynn and Jackie DeShannon.

Professional ratings
Aggregate scores
Source	Rating
Metacritic	(79%)
Review scores
Source	Rating
AllMusic	3.5/5 stars
The A.V. Club	(B)
Paste	(8.5/10)
American Songwriter	3.5/5 stars

== Track listing ==
Source: AllMusic

No.	Title	Writer(s)	Length
1.	"Right Time"	Nikki Lane; Marty Dodson; Rydan Tyndell	3:21
2.	"Good Man"	Lane; Dan Auerbach	3:45
3.	"I Don't Care"	Lane; Auerbach	2:58
4.	"You Can't Talk to Me Like That"	Lane; Auerbach; Tyndell	3:42
5.	"Seein' Double"	Lane; Clint Daniels; Jeff Hyde	3:14
6.	"Love's on Fire" (featuring Dan Auerbach)	Lane; Auerbach	3:29
7.	"All or Nothin'"	Lane; Auerbach	3:56
8.	"Sleep with a Stranger"	Lane; Barry Dean; Luke Laird	3:35
9.	"Man Up"	Lane; Tyndell	4:07
10.	"Out of My Mind"	Lane	3:59
11.	"Wild One"	Lane	3:30
12.	"Want My Heart Back"	Lane; Jay Joyce; Jeremy Spillman	2:59

== Personnel ==
- Ricardo Alessio - illustrations
- Dan Auerbach - producer, vocals (track 6)
- Tchad Blake - mixing
- Gary Briggs - A&R
- Ralph Carney - horn
- Glynis Carpenter - cover photo
- Spencer Cullun Jr. - pedal steel
- Collin Dupuis - engineer
- Bobby Emmett - keyboards
- Caroline "Chuck" H. Grant - back cover photo
- Joshua Hedley - fiddle
- Patrick Keeler - drums
- Carey Kotsionis - background vocals
- Nikki Lane - vocals, background vocals, guitar
- Brian Lucey - mastering
- The McCrary Sisters - background vocals
- Paul Moore - design
- Aaron Oliva - bass
- Russ Pahl - pedal steel
- Dave Roe - bass
- Danny Tomczak - studio assistant
- Kenny Vaughan - guitar
