= Hoops (TV series) =

American animated television series

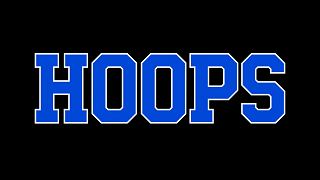
- Genre: Animated sitcom; Adult animation; Sports
- Created by: Ben Hoffman
- Voices of: Jake Johnson; Ron Funches; Cleo King; Natasha Leggero; A. D. Miles; Rob Riggle
- Music by: Scott Hoffman
- Country of origin: United States
- Original language: English
- No. of seasons: 1
- No. of episodes: 10

Production
- Executive producers: Ben Hoffman; Jake Johnson; M. Dickson; Phil Lord; Christopher Miller; Seth Cohen; Itay Reiss
- Producers: Aubrey Davis Lee; James Merrill
- Editor: Amy Blaisdell
- Running time: 23–26 minutes
- Production companies: Pepper Hill Productions; Walcott Company; Lord Miller Productions; Georgia Entertainment Industries; 20th Century Fox Television

Original release
- Network: Netflix
- Release: August 21, 2020

Hoops is an American adult animated sitcom created by Ben Hoffman for Netflix. It premiered on August 21, 2020, to extremely negative reviews. In December 2020, Netflix cancelled the series after one season.

== Premise ==
Hoops follows Ben Hopkins, "a hot-headed, foul-mouthed high school basketball coach who thinks turning around his God-awful team will take him to the 'big leagues' and turn his miserable life around."

== Cast and characters ==
=== Main ===
- Jake Johnson as Coach Ben Hopkins, a rude and bad-tempered basketball coach at Lenwood High School. He is Shannon's ex-husband, Ron's best friend and Barry's estranged son. Ben's main goal is to turn his team's poor reputation around, but his attempts to do this often end in disaster and failure (with the exception of the episode "The Sponsor", in which he encourages each member of the team to treat the competition like their respective father, which leads to a rare victory for Ben's team). Aside from basketball, Ben wants to rekindle his relationship with Shannon, and is also obsessed with the 1991 film Little Man Tate.
- Ron Funches as Ron, Lenwood High's assistant basketball coach and Ben's best friend who is dating Ben's estranged wife.
- Cleo King as Opal Lowry, the principal at Lenwood High and Ben's boss.
- Natasha Leggero as Shannon, Ben's estranged wife.
- A. D. Miles as Matty Atkins, a seven-foot-tall 16-year-old who is on Lenwood High's basketball team.
- Rob Riggle as Barry Hopkins, a legendary former basketball player who is now the owner of Hopkins Steakhouse and Ben's father.

=== Recurring ===
- Nick Swardson as Scott, a gay teenager who plays on Lenwood High's basketball team
- Sam Richardson as Marcus, the only African-American player on the basketball team. He is often the team's voice of reason.
- Ben Hoffman as Time Bomb, a redneck player on the basketball team who is implied to be from an inbred family.
- Eric Edelstein as Kirk, one of Ben's friends.
- Mary Holland as Connie, a prostitute whom Ben knows.
- Gil Ozeri as Isaac, a Jewish player on the basketball team.
- Steve Berg as DJ, an overweight player on the basketball team. He wears goggles with orange lenses while playing and speaks with a lisp.
- Max Greenfield as Lonnie Seymour, an ethics teacher at Lenwood, who dislikes Ben.

=== Guests ===
- Guy Fieri as himself
- Damon Wayans Jr. as Damian Chapman
- Hannah Simone as Dr. Brooks
- Will Forte as Dawa, an anger management therapist who is a Zen master. In "Zen", he helps Ben to control his temper and reduce his arrogance, only for the former to reappear later in the episode when Ben sees three gay students harassing Scott for apparently being straight, and the latter in the following episode.
- Justin Roiland as Gunnar, a kid who is believed to be Ben's illegitimate son.

== Episodes ==
No.	Title	Directed by	Written by	Original release date	Prod. code
1	"The Pilot"	Pablo Solis	Ben Hoffman	August 21, 2020	1AZB01
Ben Hopkins coaches a basketball team made up of a below-average-height group of teenagers at Lenwood High School. After suffering a mental breakdown at his latest game, Ben is told by principal Opal that he must win his next game or risk being fired. Because of this, Ben attempts to recruit Matty, a seven-foot-tall 16-year-old, into joining his team. After attempting to pay a hooker to sleep with Matty, Ben is arrested. On the day of the game, Ben is released from prison and learns that Matty has joined the team. The team loses the game, but Ben congratulates Matty as they only lost by 16 points.
2	"My Two Dads"	Ron Rubio	Annabel Seymour	August 21, 2020	1AZB02
Believing he has seen his ex-wife Shannon cheating on his best friend Ron, Ben decides to investigate. He finds out that Shannon has been hanging out with his dad, Barry, as her "second dad". The trio attends a wedding, where Ben reveals that he himself got a second dad, a random old man he found in Shannon's old home. After the old man dies, Ben and Barry attend his funeral. Meanwhile, the basketball team attempt to bond with Matty and successfully do so after getting drunk in his basement.
3	"Ethics"	James Kim	Ari Berkowitz	August 21, 2020	1AZB03
After learning that he will not be able to play basketball if he does not pass his ethics class, Matty informs Ben about his situation. After multiple failed attempts to pass Matty, Ben decides to frame Matty's ethics teacher, Mr. Lonnie, with false claims about child abduction. As Matty declares that this would be unethical, Lonnie catches Ben in the act, and surprised that Matty said no to Ben, passes Matty in his class, allowing him to play in his team's next game.
4	"The Sponsor"	Mollie Helms	Evan Mann & Gareth Reynolds	August 21, 2020	1AZB04
Opal informs Ben that his basketball team has received a sponsor, only to learn that it is his dad's restaurant. At his next game, Ben is informed that Barry has promised to give everyone in the stadium free steaks if Ben's team wins the game. Using their individual hate for their own dads, the team manage to win the game, to Barry's surprise.
5	"Matty Gets a Girlfriend"	Pablo Solis	Mike Gibbons	August 21, 2020	1AZB05
After Ben causes Matty to break up with his girlfriend Wendy, Ben and Matty visit Shannon's house to watch a tape of Ben's "proposal" to Shannon. To get even with Matty, Ben decides to use his persona, Pill Ben (which he can only access by getting to sleep using sleeping pills), to get Matty back with Wendy. This results in Pill Ben entering Wendy's house and vandalizing it. Meanwhile, the rest of the basketball team attempt to get girlfriends themselves by driving a Bang Bus-themed van around town. In the end, Ben, Matty, and the rest of the group all end up in jail. After all of their charges are dropped, Wendy and Matty get back together; Matty having made a "proposal" video similar to Ben's.
6	"Zen"	Ron Rubio	Ben Hoffman	August 21, 2020	1AZB06
After Ben causes an opponent's team mascot to fall down a flight of stairs, he is advised to visit an anger management therapist. He manages to pass the therapy class after getting high on frog poison. After the experience, Ben changes his behavior and begins to act calmly with the people he talks to, surprising almost everyone. Meanwhile, one of Ben's players, Scott, is bullied for being gay (though he is teased by the Gay Mafia as they think he is straight). This causes Ben to snap, come back to normal, and yell at the Gay Mafia.
7	"The Strike"	Mollie Helms	Steven J. Murphy	August 21, 2020	1AZB07
Ben prepares his team to face Coach Chapman, a rival he has played against for several years. Finding out that his chances of winning the game are slim to none, Ben is advised to join a team of teachers going on strike so that he will not have to attend the game. In the end, Ben manages to lose any possibility of the teachers getting their demands and his team loses the game, causing him to get the lyrics of Smash Mouth's "All Star" tattooed on his back after making a bet with Chapman prior to the game.
8	"Death"	James Kim	Evan Mann & Gareth Reynolds	August 21, 2020	1AZB08
After the deaths of a teacher and a food delivery guy, Opal hires a grief counselor, Dr. Brooks, to help students and teachers mourn the tragedy. Multiple flashbacks show Ben meeting Shannon for the first time, Ron proudly killing people in the Iraq War, Shannon deciding to divorce Ben, Barry raising Ben as a single father, Opal working as a flight attendant before becoming a school principal, and Dr. Brooks meeting her husband. In the present, Dr. Brooks dies in a car crash while talking with Ben and Shannon.
9	"The Road Game"	Pablo Solis	M. Dickson	August 21, 2020	1AZB09
After his team is invited to a prestigious basketball tournament in Cincinnati, Ben declares that anyone who is not present at the school on the day of the trip will be left behind. After oversleeping on said day, Ben decides to drive to the tournament with Shannon. During the drive, Ben and Shannon decide to stay together. Meanwhile, in Cincinnati, the rest of the basketball group accidentally cause the tournament to get canceled after filling up a pool with foam made up of poisonous chemicals.
10	"The Scout"	Ron Rubio	Charla Lauriston	August 21, 2020	1AZB10
After a few days of breaking up with Ron, Shannon breaks up with Ben. At school, Ben learns that Matty is being given an offer to play basketball at a prestigious prep school, and after a failed attempt to convince Matty not to leave Lenwood High, Ben is also given a similar offer to coach at the school. While driving Matty to the college, Ben's car gets a flat tire, leaving the pair stranded on the road.

== Production ==
On October 3, 2018, it was announced that Netflix had given the production a series order for a first season consisting of ten episodes. The series was created by Ben Hoffman who was also expected to executive produce alongside Phil Lord, Christopher Miller, Seth Cohen, M. Dickson and Jake Johnson. Production companies involved with the series were slated to be Bento Box Entertainment and 20th Century Fox Television. Alongside the series order announcement, it was confirmed that Jake Johnson was set to star in the series. In July 2020, it was announced that Natasha Leggero, Rob Riggle, Ron Funches, Cleo King and A. D. Miles were cast in starring roles. The official series trailer was released on August 6, 2020. The series premiered on August 21, 2020. It is the last show to be released under the 20th Century Fox Television label, as the company has changed its name into 20th Television in August 2020. On December 8, 2020, Netflix canceled the series after one season.

The show was pitched to MTV, Fox, FX, Comedy Central, HBO and Adult Swim who all turned down the series.

== Reception ==
Hoops received negative reviews from critics. The review aggregator website Rotten Tomatoes gives it an approval rating of 14% based on 14 reviews, with an average rating of 3.50/10. The website's critics consensus reads, "Crude, rude, and aimless, Hoops's first season throws nothing but bricks." Metacritic, another aggregation site, gives it a weighted average score of 35 out of 100 based on 9 reviews, indicating "generally unfavorable reviews".

Caroline Framke of Variety described the series "isn't half the joke machine it would need to be in order to justify its total lack of nuance". Stuart Jeffries of The Guardian described it as a "puerile comedy ... perfect for Trump's America" that is more "toxically retrograde" than Love Thy Neighbour, noting its sexualized portrayal of women, an overabundance of penis jokes, and a cast of mostly stereotypical token characters.
