= Highway Queen =

Studio album by Nikki Lane
- Released: February 17, 2017
- Studio: the Echo Lab
- Genre: Americana; outlaw country
- Length: 37:01
- Label: New West
- Producer: Jonathan Tyler

Nikki Lane chronology
All or Nothin' (2014)	Highway Queen (2017)	Denim & Diamonds (2022)

Professional ratings
Aggregate scores
Source	Rating
Metacritic	78/100
Review scores
Source	Rating
AllMusic	4/5 stars
The Guardian	3.5/5 stars

Highway Queen is the third studio album by American outlaw country singer Nikki Lane. It was released on February 17, 2017 on New West Records.

== Background and recording ==
Lane's previous album All or Nothin' suggests a more hipster side of her musical style. With the release of her third studio album, her traditional Americana styles are showcased. Lane co-produced the album with Jonathan Tyler, from Jonathan Tyler and the Northern Light.

== Commercial performance ==
The album has sold 8,300 copies in the United States as of May 2017.

Highway Queen was the third most played Americana album in 2017 according to the Americana Music Association's official Airplay Chart, coming in behind The Nashville Sound by Jason Isbell and From A Room: Volume 1 by Chris Stapleton.

== Track listing ==
Taken from AllMusic

No.	Title	Writer(s)	Length
1.	"700,000 Rednecks"	Nikki Lane	3:30
2.	"Highway Queen"	Lane; Ryan Tyndell	3:51
3.	"Lay You Down"	Lane	3:57
4.	"Jackpot"	Lane	3:33
5.	"Companion"	Lane	3:08
6.	"Big Mouth"	Lane; Erica McGillis	3:39
7.	"Foolish Heart"	Lane	4:04
8.	"Send the Sun"	Lane	2:57
9.	"Muddy Waters"	Lane; Wade Ryff	3:11
10.	"Forever Lasts Forever"	Jeff Hyde; Lane; Ryan Tyndell	5:06

== Personnel ==
Adapted from AllMusic.

- Ryan Ake – guitar, electric guitar, rhythm guitar
- Ricardo Alessio – package design
- Kim Buie – A&R
- Greg Calbi – mastering
- Justin Collins – assistant engineer
- Shelly Colvin – vocal harmony, background vocals
- Steven Cooper – acoustic guitar, electric guitar
- Daniel Creamer – keyboards, percussion, background vocals
- Collin Dupuis – engineer, mixing, percussion, producer
- Ben Eyestone – drums
- Ian Fitchuk – piano
- Josh Hedley – fiddle
- Ricky Ray Jackson – electric guitar, pedal steel
- Nikki Lane – rhythm guitar, primary artist, producer, vocals, background vocals
- Lee Foster – executive producer
- Scott Lee – bass guitar
- John McTigue – drums
- Alex Muñoz – guitar, baritone guitar
- Russ Pahl – pedal steel
- Matt Pence – drums, engineer, percussion, producer
- Taylor Powell – tambourine
- Dave Roe – bass guitar
- Jeff Saenz – acoustic guitar
- Eden Tyler – photography
- Jonathan Tyler – acoustic guitar, producer, background vocals
- Kenny Vaughan – guitar, acoustic guitar, rhythm guitar
- Eric Whitman – bass guitar, piano
- Erika Wolf – background vocals
