= Natural Selection (2016 film) =

2016 film by Chad L. Scheifele

- Film poster
- Directed by: Chad L. Scheifele
- Written by: Chad L. Scheifele
- Produced by: Pam Landis; Mary Jo Barthmaier; Stuart Connelly
- Starring: Mason Dye; Katherine McNamara; Anthony Michael Hall; Amy Carlson; Ryan Munzert
- Cinematography: Brandon Ripley
- Edited by: Ray Chung
- Music by: Evan A. L. Stultz
- Production companies: Modoc Spring; 2 Die 4 Films
- Distributed by: ITN Distribution
- Release date: August 26, 2016
- Running time: 101 minutes
- Country: United States
- Language: English

Natural Selection is a 2016 American crime thriller drama film written and directed by Chad L. Scheifele (in his feature directorial debut), based on his 2009 short film of the same name. It stars Mason Dye, Katherine McNamara, Anthony Michael Hall, Amy Carlson, and Ryan Munzert. It follows a shy teenager who, after moving to a new town with his alcoholic mother, is targeted by bullies at his new high school and drawn into a violent plan.

The film was released in select theaters and on VOD and iTunes on August 26, 2016, by ITN Distribution. It received negative reviews from critics.

== Plot ==
Tyler and his mother Laura are recent arrivals in town. As the new kid in the local high school, Tyler is soon torn, being drawn in one direction by the local rebel Indrid, and in another by Paige, a sweet girl who tutors some of the local students.

== Cast ==
- Mason Dye as Tyler
- Ryan Munzert as Indrid
- Katherine McNamara as Paige
- Anthony Michael Hall as Mr. Stevenson
- Amy Carlson as Laura
- Tyler Elliot Burke as Matt
- Esther Zyskind as Angela
- Ryan Boudreau as Steve
- Michael Nikolich as Wesley
- Anthony Del Negro as Brian
- Tyler Garamella as Josh
- Anna Friedman as Samantha
- Catherine Missal as Tiffany
- Makenzie Hughes as Catherine
- Camilla Mendes as Celest Hugh

== Reception ==
Michael Rechtshaffen of the Los Angeles Times described the film as "a stiffly heavy-handed, drawn-out, faith-based drama about a Christ-like teen struggling to find his true path." John DeFore of The Hollywood Reporter wrote, "This debut feature plays like a glum after-school special whose jealousies and painful secrets project little heat" and "Munzert tries hard in this thin role, but the cast in general looks too bored to justify Indrid's rage." Meanwhile, Ayurella Horn-Muller of Film Threat stated, "One of the key issues with this movie is the direction. All 120 minutes feels downright unnatural. […] Natural Selection's only saving grace is its young cast. Munzert's dark tortured take on Indrid is easily one of the main reasons to watch through to the end."
