= Shut Up and Fish =

Single by Maddie & Tae

from the album Start Here
- Released: November 2, 2015
- Recorded: 2015
- Genre: Country
- Length: 3:18
- Label: Republic; Dot
- Songwriters: Taylor Dye; Maddie Marlow; Aaron Scherz; Pete Sallis
- Producer: Dann Huff

Maddie & Tae singles chronology
"Fly" (2015)	"Shut Up and Fish" (2015)	"Sierra" (2016)

"Shut Up and Fish" is a song co-written and recorded by American country music duo Maddie & Tae. It was released to radio on November 2, 2015, as the third single from their debut studio album, Start Here. The song was written by the duo (Taylor Dye/Madison Marlow), Aaron Scherz and Pete Sallis. It garnered a positive reception from critics who praised the role-reversal of typical gender characters in country music songs.

"Shut Up and Fish" had minor chart success compared to both "Girl in a Country Song" and "Fly", peaking at numbers 23 and 30 on both the Billboard Country Airplay and Hot Country Songs charts respectively. It also charted in Canada, reaching number 36 on the Country chart. The accompanying music video for the song, directed by TK McKamy, starred actor Mason Dye, Taylor's brother.

== Content ==
Jewly Hight of Billboard wrote that the song "flips another gendered country music script. In the past, male singers usually have been the ones cracking wise about the incompetence of city slickers; this time, it's Maddie & Tae delivering withering lines like, 'He pulled up in his red Corvette, salmon shorts and a white V-neck. I said, Wow, you know how to dress down for a city guy.'"

The pair commented in a Rolling Stone article that the song was based on an actual event: "A real event that actually happened. We were 16. This was the first summer that we actually got to hang out a lot. One day we were just really bored: "We love to fish, so let's go fishing." We'd been texting these guys, "Do you want to go fishing with us?" We literally thought it was just fishing, because they had the fishing poles, which they didn't even know how to use, come to find out. So we get there, and they come dressed up in like white v-necks and coral shorts. Just the typical city boy with their Sperry [boat shoes] and stuff. So we're like, "You know we're going fishing, right?""

== Critical reception ==
Billy Dukes of Taste of Country reviewed the song with favor, saying that it "is more universal than even they thought. Sure, women of just about any age can relate to a guy picking the wrong time to make his move, but men everywhere can identify with this song. Who hasn’t been the guy in the boat?" Both Hight and Jon Dolan of Rolling Stone compared its theme favorably to "Girl in a Country Song" in terms of reversing the roles usually held by young males and females in country music songs.

== Music video ==
The music video was directed by TK McKamy and premiered in December 2015. Taylor's brother, Mason Dye, stars in the video.

== Chart performance ==
=== Weekly charts ===
Chart (2015–2016)	Peak position
Canada Country (Billboard)	36
US Country Airplay (Billboard)	23
US Hot Country Songs (Billboard)	30

=== Year-end charts ===
Chart (2016)	Position
US Hot Country Songs (Billboard)	91
