= Friends Don't =

Single by Maddie & Tae

from the album The Way It Feels
- Released: May 14, 2018
- Genre: Country
- Length: 3:10
- Label: Mercury Nashville
- Songwriter(s): Taylor Dye; Maddie Marlow; Justin Ebach; Jon Nite
- Producer(s): Jimmy Robbins; Derek Wells

Maddie & Tae singles chronology
"Sierra" (2016)	"Friends Don't" (2018)	"Die from a Broken Heart" (2019)

"Friends Don't" is a song co-written and recorded by American country music duo Maddie & Tae. It was released on May 14, 2018 as the lead-off single to their second studio album The Way It Feels.

== Content ==
"Friends Don't" was co-written by both members of Maddie & Tae alongside Justin Ebach and Jon Nite.

== Music video ==
The music video for "Friends Don't" was directed by TK McKamy and premiered on August 3, 2018.

== Chart performance ==
Chart (2018–2019)	Peak position
US Country Airplay (Billboard)	33
US Hot Country Songs (Billboard)	39

== Certifications ==
Sales and certifications for "Friends Don't"
Region	Certification	Certified units/sales
United States (RIAA)	Platinum	1,000,000^{‡}
^{‡} Sales+streaming figures based on certification alone.
