= Ben Hoffman =

American comedian and musician (born 1974)

- Born: Benjamin Isaac Hoffman; Lexington, Kentucky, U.S.
- Other names: Wheeler Walker, Jr.
- Occupations: Comedian; actor; writer; singer; record producer
- Years active: 2005–present
- Musical career
- Origin: Nashville, Tennessee, U.S.
- Genres: Country; outlaw country; country rock; comedy; comedy rock; satire
- Instruments: Vocals; guitar
- Labels: Thirty Tigers; Pepper Hill Records
- Website: wheelerwalkerjr.com

YouTube information
- Channel: Wheeler Walker, Jr.
- Years active: 2015–present
- Subscribers: 822K
- Last updated: May 30, 2026

Benjamin Isaac Hoffman is an American comedian, actor, writer, and musician. Hoffman is better known by his country musician alter ego Wheeler Walker Jr., as whom he has released six studio albums.

His first album as Wheeler Walker Jr., Redneck Shit (2016), debuted at number nine on the Billboard Hot Country Albums chart and peaked the Billboard Top Comedy Albums chart, making it the first album in over a decade to debut in the top ten on both those charts simultaneously. Despite no FM radio play, Hoffman found success with streaming and social media.

Reception to Hoffman's music has been mixed, largely due to the raunchiness of his lyrics and themes. Some have called the Wheeler Walker Jr. character an "experiment in free speech" and "a platform to speak out against censorship and bias in the music industry". Hoffman has been vocal about his use of the character as a means to express his displeasure with the modern state of the country music industry, particularly the rise of the bro-country subgenre.

== Early life ==
Hoffman was born in Lexington, Kentucky. He is the older brother of Scissor Sisters bassist Babydaddy (Scott Hoffman). Hoffman is Jewish and attended Tulane University. He graduated from the University of Kentucky.

== Career ==
Hoffman created and hosted The Ben Show, which premiered on Comedy Central on February 28, 2013. The show was broadcast for one season.

He was a writer and correspondent for the Sports Show with Norm Macdonald, and has written for the MTV Video Music Awards, Archer, and The Late Late Show with James Corden. He has appeared in acting roles on Arrested Development, New Girl and Drunk History and has produced content for and appeared on InfoMania.

In 2020, Hoffman created the Netflix adult animated comedy series Hoops. In addition to writing, he provided voice talent and was also an executive producer alongside Phil Lord, Christopher Miller, Seth Cohen, and Jake Johnson. The show was cancelled after the completion of one season.

== Wheeler Walker Jr. ==
Hoffman debuted an early version of the satirical country music artist Wheeler Walker Jr. character on a skit for The Ben Show in 2013 where he performed his song "Eatin' Pussy, Kickin' Ass".

He recorded and released his first album, Redneck Shit, on February 12, 2016, via Thirty Tigers and Pepper Hill Records. The album was produced by Dave Cobb out of Nashville and originally premiered via stream on the pornographic website PornHub. It debuted at number nine on the Billboard Top Country Albums chart, number one on the Billboard Top Comedy Albums chart, and number 127 on the US Billboard 200. It was the first album to debut in both the top ten of the comedy and country charts. It sold 5,900 copies in its first week.

Rolling Stone called it "Unfathomably obscene and undeniably offensive, the debut album from Nashville never-was Wheeler Walker Jr. is also goddamn funny. But Redneck Shit is far from just an X-rated novelty record."

I took my fucking life savings, which I don't want to mention here, 'cause it ain't much to brag about, and I gave it all to Dave and said, let's make the album without any fucking record company telling me what to do".

— Hoffman on creating his first album.

The Wheeler Walker Jr. persona has been compared to other artists such as Chinga Chavin, Andy Kaufman, and David Allan Coe. The character's fictional biography outlines his history as an unsigned Nashville talent too crude for mainstream radio due to his desire to revamp the classic outlaw country style by playing songs that would have "gotten him yanked off the Grand Ol' Opry broadcast in a matter of seconds", although he finally found success with the rise of uncensored satellite radio and the internet.

On April 16, 2016, Hoffman appeared as the character on the Joe Rogan Experience podcast episode #786. He has been a guest on a number of other podcasts including Your Mom's House with Tom Segura and Christina Pazsitzky, The Church of What's Happening Now with Joey Diaz, The official Podcast and Bertcast with Bert Kreischer. He also appeared and performed live on The Howard Stern Wrap Up Show on May 25, 2017.

His second album, Ol' Wheeler, was released on June 2, 2017, and debuted at number 10 on the Billboard Top Country Albums chart, with 7,800 copies sold in its first week. It also debuted at number one on the Billboard Top Comedy Albums chart where it remained for three consecutive weeks, and peaked at number five on the Billboard Country chart. Prior to the album's release, crowd funding music site PledgeMusic removed the album's pre-sales and refunded fans due to obscenity complaints. Upset, Hoffman claimed censorship and angry fans responded by trolling a page promoting the band 311. The album was originally going to include a duet with Grammy Award-winning artist Maren Morris on the song "Fuckin' Around", but it was pulled by Sony Music Nashville. Hoffman had previously performed alongside Morris and Jake Owen at a party following the 50th Annual Country Music Association Awards in 2016. The duet was instead recorded with Nikki Lane, credited as "Kacey Walker".

Hoffman toured throughout the United States from 2016 through 2018. During the summer of 2018, he toured with Kid Rock and Brantley Gilbert in the Red Blooded Rock n Roll Redneck Extravaganza Tour. He also performed his song "Sit On My Face" alongside Tyler Childers and Sturgill Simpson at Hinterland Music Festival in 2018. Hoffman, outfitted as Wheeler, presented an award to Childers at the Americana Music Honors & Awards that same year. Hoffman concluded his tour on December 8, 2018, with a final concert at The Rave in Milwaukee, Wisconsin.

His third album, WW III, was released on November 30, 2018. The album topped the Comedy chart and also sat at number one on the iTunes Country chart. He released first greatest hits compilation entitled Fuck You Bitch: All Time Greatest Hits on May 1, 2020. It features material from his three studio albums along with two new tracks, "Drunk as Fuck" and "Go Big or Go Home".

Worldwide, Hoffman was the third most streamed country artist in 2021. On March 8, 2022, Hoffman, outfitted in the Wheeler Walker Jr. persona, was removed by security from the Country Music Hall of Fame property in Nashville after protesting the Florida Georgia Line exhibit. He held a picket sign reading "FGL does not belong here", citing a belief that the duo's music is pop and not country.

On April 14, 2022, Hoffman commenced his "2022 Comeback Tour" when he headlined the historic Ryman Auditorium in Nashville, his first live performance since 2018. He promoted the concert by joking about his desire to get "cancelled". The concert sold out, and broke records for alcohol and merchandise sales at the venue.

On April 15, 2022, he released his fourth album, Sex, Drugs & Country Music. It debuted at number one on the iTunes chart and number two on the Comedy albums chart. On May 1, 2023, Hoffman announced the "Spread Eagle Tour", with thirty-three concerts across the United States.

On July 19, 2023, Hoffman released the single "Money 'N' Bitches". That same day, he also announced his fifth studio album Ram, which was released on September 15, 2023. The album features a more rock-oriented sound than his previous albums.

On June 8, 2026, Hoffman announced his sixth studio album, Pullin' Out, alongside the release of its lead single, "Fuck This Bar". Hoffman also confirmed that the album will be his final release under the Wheeler Walker Jr. persona, announcing his plans to retire the character the following year and supporting the project with an accompanying farewell tour. The album was released on September 25, 2026.

== Discography ==
All albums credited to Wheeler Walker Jr.

=== Studio albums ===
Title	Details	Peak chart positions				Sales
Title	Details	US	US Country	US Indie	US Comedy	Sales
Redneck Shit	Release date: February 12, 2016; Label: Pepper Hill	127	9	6	1	US: 45,900
Ol' Wheeler	Release date: June 2, 2017; Label: Pepper Hill	88	10	5	1	US: 9,700
WW III	Release date: November 30, 2018; Label: Pepper Hill/Thirty Tigers	187	20	3	1	US: 8,300
Sex Drugs & Country Music	Release date: April 15, 2022; Label: Pepper Hill/Thirty Tigers	—	—	—	2	
Ram	Released: September 15, 2023; Label: Pepper Hill/Thirty Tigers	—	—	—	2	
Pullin' Out	Released: September 25, 2026; Label: Thirty Tigers	—	—	—	8	

=== Compilation albums ===
Title	Album details
Fuck You Bitch: All-Time Greatest Hits	Released: April 3, 2020; Label: Pepper Hill

== Filmography ==
=== Television ===
Year	Title	Director	Writer	Executive Producer	Notes
2007	2007 MTV Video Music Awards	No	Yes	No	
2008–2011	InfoMania	No	Yes	Yes	47 episodes
2011	Sports Show with Norm Macdonald	No	Yes	No	7 episodes
2012	The Jesse Miller Show	No	Yes	No	
2013	Comedy Central Roast of James Franco	No	Yes	No	
2013	The Ben Show	Yes	Yes	Yes	8 episodes
2014	Archer	No	Yes	No	Episodes: "Southbound and Down", "Vision Quest"
2015–2016	The Late Late Show with James Corden	No	Yes	No	Wrote 38 episodes
2020	Hoops	Yes	Yes	Yes	Series creator

=== Acting roles ===
Year	Title	Role	Notes
2005	Arrested Development	FBI Guy #1	1 episode
2005	MovieMania	Spider-Man	1 episode
2008, 2013	Drunk History	Doctor (2008), Newscaster (2013)	Episode: "Drunk History Vol. 4: Featuring Paul Schneider", "San Francisco"
2012	New Girl	Sherman	Episode: "Injured"
2020	Hoops	Time Bomb (voice)	9 episodes

=== Music videos ===
Year	Title	Role	Artist	Album
2015	"Fuck you Bitch"	Wheeler Walker Jr.	Wheeler Walker Jr.	Redneck Shit
2015	"Drop 'Em Out"	Wheeler Walker Jr.	Wheeler Walker Jr.	Redneck Shit
2016	"Redneck Shit"	Wheeler Walker Jr.	Wheeler Walker Jr.	Redneck Shit
2017	"Pussy King"	Wheeler Walker Jr.	Wheeler Walker Jr.	Ol' Wheeler
2017	"Finger up My Butt"	Wheeler Walker Jr.	Wheeler Walker Jr.	Ol' Wheeler
2017	"Summers in Kentucky"	Wheeler Walker Jr.	Wheeler Walker Jr.	Ol' Wheeler
2017	"Puss in Boots"	Wheeler Walker Jr.	Wheeler Walker Jr.	Ol' Wheeler
2017	"Pictures on My Phone"	Wheeler Walker Jr.	Wheeler Walker Jr.	Ol' Wheeler
2018	"I Like Smoking Pot (A Lot)"	Wheeler Walker Jr.	Wheeler Walker Jr.	WW III
2018	"Rich Sumbitch"	Wheeler Walker Jr.	Wheeler Walker Jr.	WW III
2018	"All The Pussy You Will Slay"	Wheeler Walker Jr.	Wheeler Walker Jr.	WW III
2020	"Go Big or Go Home"	Wheeler Walker Jr.	Wheeler Walker Jr.	Fuck You Bitch: All Time Greatest Hits
2022	"Fucked by a Country Boy"	Wheeler Walker Jr.	Wheeler Walker Jr.	Sex, Drugs & Country Music
2022	"She's a Country Music Fan"	Wheeler Walker Jr.	Wheeler Walker Jr.	Sex, Drugs & Country Music
2022	"God Told Me to Fuck You"	Wheeler Walker Jr.	Wheeler Walker Jr.	Sex, Drugs & Country Music
2023	"Money 'N' Bitches"	Wheeler Walker Jr.	Wheeler Walker Jr.	Ram
2023	"Dumptruck"	Wheeler Walker Jr.	Wheeler Walker Jr.	Ram
2023	"Fingerblast"	Wheeler Walker Jr.	Wheeler Walker Jr.	Ram
2023	"Fuck This Job"	Wheeler Walker Jr.	Wheeler Walker Jr.	Ram
