= The Way It Feels (Maddie & Tae album) =

Studio album by Maddie & Tae
- Released: April 10, 2020
- Recorded: 2017–2019
- Studio: Ocean Way, Nashville
- Genre: Country
- Length: 48:52
- Label: Mercury Nashville
- Producer: Jimmy Robbins; Derek Wells

Maddie & Tae chronology
Everywhere I'm Goin' (2019)	The Way It Feels (2020)	Through the Madness, Vol. 1 (2022)

Singles from The Way It Feels
- 1. "Friends Don't" Released: May 14, 2018; 2. "Die from a Broken Heart" Released: May 6, 2019

The Way It Feels is the second studio album by American country music duo Maddie & Tae. It was released on April 10, 2020. It is a concept album and serves as the follow-up to their 2015 debut album Start Here.

== Background ==
After releasing their debut album in 2015 with Dot Records, the label announced that they would be shutting down in early 2017. At the time, the duo had already begun working on their second album.

In June 2017, the duo announced that they had signed with Universal Music Group under their Mercury Nashville imprint. Marlow revealed that they "started fresh" and got to work writing new songs for their sophomore record. By the summer of 2018, the duo revealed that the album had been completed and was awaiting a release date, though "Bathroom Floor" was a track that ended up being added to the album in 2019.

Prior to the release of their second album, the duo released two five-track EPs: One Heart to Another in April 2019 and Everywhere I'm Goin' in October 2019. All ten tracks appear on The Way It Feels.

== Singles ==
"Friends Don't" was released on May 14, 2018, as the duo's first single off of their sophomore album. The song served as their first single in two years and the first to be released under Mercury Nashville.

The album's second single, "Die from a Broken Heart," was released on May 6, 2019. Both singles had first appeared on the duo's EP One Heart to Another that was released in April 2019.

== Critical reception ==
Professional ratings
Review scores
Source	Rating
AllMusic	3.5/5 stars

Stephen Thomas Erlewine of AllMusic wrote that the duo "and their cast of supporting writers know how to sculpt tuneful, sincere country tunes and their harmonies aren't merely convincing, but prove a balm, sounding sweet and soulful even underneath the layers of gloss by producers Jimmy Robbins and Derek Wells."

== Track listing ==
The Way It Feels track listing
No.	Title	Writer(s)	Length
1.	"Everywhere I'm Goin"	Taylor Dye; Maddie Marlow; Jimmy Robbins; Josh Thompson	3:28
2.	"Bathroom Floor"	Dye; Marlow; Josh Kerr	2:33
3.	"My Man"	Dye; Marlow; Dave Barnes; Jordan Reynolds	3:01
4.	"Tourist in This Town"	Dye; Marlow; Robbins; Barry Dean	3:25
5.	"Drunk or Lonely"	Dye; Marlow; Deric Ruttan; Forest Whitehead	3:43
6.	"One Heart to Another"	Dye; Marlow; Ruttan; Jonathan Singleton	3:38
7.	"Trying on Rings"	Dye; Marlow; Robbins; Laura Veltz	3:05
8.	"Write a Book"	Dye; Marlow; Kerr; Veltz	3:26
9.	"Water in His Wine Glass"	Dye; Marlow; Robbins; Jon Nite	3:21
10.	"Die from a Broken Heart"	Dye; Marlow; Ruttan; Singleton	3:29
11.	"Ain’t There Yet"	Dye; Marlow; Barnes; Ben West	2:58
12.	"Lay Here with Me" (featuring Dierks Bentley)	Dye; Marlow; Barnes; Kerr	3:08
13.	"Friends Don't"	Dye; Marlow; Nite; Justin Ebach	3:08
14.	"I Don't Need to Know"	Dye; Marlow; Robbins; Adam Hambrick	3:20
15.	"New Dog Old Tricks"	Veltz; Jesse Frasure; Emily Weisband	3:09
Total length:			48:52

== Personnel ==
Adapted from the album's liner notes.

Musicians

- Maddie Marlow – lead vocals
- Taylor Dye – background vocals
- Dierks Bentley – guest vocals
- Derek Wells – acoustic guitar, electric guitar, banjo, B-3, mandolin
- Ilya Toshinsky – acoustic guitar, mandolin, banjo
- Bryan Sutton – acoustic guitar
- Kris Donegan – electric guitar
- Russ Pahl – steel guitar
- Jimmie Lee Sloas – bass guitar
- Tony Lucido – bass guitar
- Jerry Roe – drums
- Fred Eltringham – drums
- Evan Hutchings – drums
- David Dorn – piano, B-3, synth, Wurlitzer, keyboards

Production

- Jimmy Robbins – producer, programming
- Derek Wells – producer
- Ben West – programming
- Ben Fowler – engineer
- Josh Ditty – assistant engineer
- Lowell Reynolds – assistant engineer
- Justin Neibank – mixing
- Dave Clauss – mixing ("My Man", "Drunk or Lonely")
- Ben Phillips – digital editing
- Buckley Miller – digital editing
- Mike "Frog" Griffith – production coordination
- Adam Ayan – mastering

Imagery

- Karen Naff – art direction and design
- Carlos Rios – photography
- Amber Cannon – hair
- Neil Robison – makeup
- Tiffany Gifford – wardrobe stylist
- Kera Jackson – art production

== Charts ==
Sales chart performance of The Way It Feels
Chart (2020)	Peak position
Scottish Albums (OCC)	86
UK Country Albums (OCC)	8
UK Album Downloads (OCC)	37
US Billboard 200	74
US Top Country Albums (Billboard)	7

== Certifications ==
Region	Certification	Certified units/sales
United States (RIAA)	Gold	500,000^{‡}
^{‡} Sales+streaming figures based on certification alone.

== See also ==
- List of 2020 albums
