= The Ben Show =

- Also known as: The Ben Show With Ben Hoffman
- Genre: Sketch comedy
- Created by: Ben Hoffman
- Directed by: Blake Webster
- Starring: Ben Hoffman
- Country of origin: United States
- Original language: English
- No. of seasons: 1
- No. of episodes: 8

Production
- Executive producers: Ben Hoffman; Derek Van Pelt; Itay Reiss; Judi Brown Marmel; Mike Gibbons; Monika Zielinska
- Camera setup: Single camera
- Running time: 21 minutes
- Production company: Levity Productions

Original release
- Network: Comedy Central
- Release: February 28 – April 18, 2013

The Ben Show (also known as The Ben Show With Ben Hoffman) is an American sketch comedy television series created and hosted by comedian Ben Hoffman. The series premiered on February 28, 2013, on the American cable television network Comedy Central. Hoffman, Mike Gibbons, Itay Reiss, Derek Van Pelt, and Judi Brown Marmel serve as the show's executive producers.

The show was not renewed for a second season.

== Premise ==
In each episode, Ben Hoffman undergoes a different "life journey," including forming a band, finding religion, auditioning for a reality show, and volunteering. Hoffman seeks advice from people like his father, ex-girlfriends, and his therapist, who also help Hoffman in introducing the show's sketches.

== Episodes ==
No.	Title	Original release date	US viewers (millions)
1	"Ben Buys A Gun"	February 28, 2013	0.41
2	"Ben Forms A Band"	March 7, 2013	0.58
3	"Ben Redecorates"	March 14, 2013	0.43
4	"Ben Has a Blind Date"	March 21, 2013	0.44
5	"Ben Goes Home"	March 28, 2013	0.43
6	"Ben Takes Ambien"	April 4, 2013	0.47
7	"Ben Chills The F*%# Out"	April 11, 2013	0.61
8	"Ben Throws a Party"	April 18, 2013	0.50
