= Through the Madness, Vol. 1 =

EP by Maddie & Tae
- Released: January 28, 2022
- Genre: Country pop
- Length: 27:04
- Label: UMG
- Producer: Josh Kerr; Jimmy Robbins; Derek Wells

Maddie & Tae chronology
The Way It Feels (2020)	Through the Madness, Vol. 1 (2022)	Through the Madness, Vol. 2 (2022)

Singles from Through the Madness, Vol. 1
- 1. "Woman You Got" Released: March 31, 2021; 2. "Madness" Released: October 29, 2021; 3. "Strangers" Released: January 7, 2022

Through the Madness, Vol. 1 is an EP by Nashville country duo Maddie & Tae, released January 28, 2022, by UMG Recordings. The country pop release is the first half of an upcoming full album, with the latter half set to be released on September 23.

== Singles and music video ==
The EP was preceded by the singles "Woman You Got", released March 31, 2021, "Madness", released October 29, 2021, (from which the EP's name was derived) and "Strangers", released on January 7, 2022. "Woman You Got" also got a music video released on June 30, 2021, which starred the duo and featured scenes referencing the films Clueless and Risky Business, and guest appearances by their husbands, Jonah Font and Josh Kerr.

== Commercial performance ==
The EP peaked at 46 on Billboard's Top Current Album Sales chart, and 79 on the Top Album Sales chart.

== Reception ==
Through the Madness, Vol. 1 ratings
Review scores
Source	Rating
Holler	7/10

Holler's Will Groff wrote that the duo are "arguably playing it safe", but even then, "make for a captivating pair" with "nuances to certain songs that reward paying full attention", but that "one only wishes there were more of them."

== Track listing ==
All tracks are written by Maddie Font and Taylor Kerr, with additional writers noted. All songs produced by Derek Wells and Jimmy Robbins, except track 7, produced by Wells and Josh Kerr.

Through the Madness, Vol. 1 track listing
No.	Title	Writer(s)	Length
1.	"What It's Like Loving You"	Jordan Minton, J. Kerr	3:16
2.	"Woman You Got"	Laura Veltz, Mark Holman	2:58
3.	"Don't Make Her Look Dumb" (featuring Morgane Stapleton)	Barry Dean, Luke Laird	4:03
4.	"Grown Man Cry"	Eric Arjes, Minton	3:20
5.	"Madness"	Jessie Jo Dillon, Zach Kale	3:25
6.	"The Other Side" (featuring Lori McKenna)	J. Kerr, McKenna	3:30
7.	"Wish You the Best"	Josh Thompson, Matt Dragstrem	2:59
8.	"Strangers"	Adam Hambrick, Robbins	3:33
Total length:			27:04

== Personnel ==
=== Musicians ===
Maddie & Tae

- Maddie Font – vocals
- Taylor Kerr – vocals

Additional musicians

- Kris Donegan – electric guitar
- David Dorn – keyboards
- Evan Hutchings – drums
- Josh Kerr – electric guitar, acoustic guitar (7), programming (7)
- Tony Lucido – bass guitar
- Lori McKenna – vocals (6)
- Justin Schipper – steel guitar (2, 6)
- Morgane Stapleton – vocals (3)
- Bryan Sutton – acoustic guitar (1, 2, 4–6, 8)
- Ilya Toshinsky – acoustic guitar (3, 7)
- Derek Wells – electric guitar

=== Production ===
- Adam Ayan – mastering engineer (3, 4, 6–8)
- Sean Badum – assistant recording engineer (5)
- Dave Clauss – recording engineer, mixing engineer
- Joel McKenney – assistant recording engineer (2)
- Jimmy Robbins – recording engineer
- Derek Wells – recording engineer
- Mike "Frog" Griffith – production coordinator
