= Silo, Oklahoma =

Town in Oklahoma, US

- Town
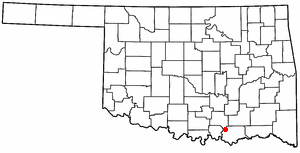
- Location of Silo, Oklahoma
- Coordinates: 34°02′09″N 96°28′28″W
- Country: United States
- State: Oklahoma
- County: Bryan

Area
  - Total: 0.52 sq mi (1.35 km^{2})
  - Land: 0.52 sq mi (1.35 km^{2})
  - Water: 0 sq mi (0.00 km^{2})
- Elevation: 801 ft (244 m)

Population (2020)
  - Total: 384
  - Density: 740/sq mi (285/km^{2})
- Time zone: UTC-6 (Central (CST))
  - Summer (DST): UTC-5 (CDT)
- FIPS code: 40-67550
- GNIS feature ID: 2413283

Silo is a town in Bryan County, Oklahoma, United States. As of the 2020 census, Silo had a population of 384.

== Geography ==
According to the United States Census Bureau, the town has a total area of 0.5 square miles (1.3 km^{2}), all land.

== History ==
The population was 246 in the territorial census in 1900, 180 in the special 1907 census at statehood, and 152 in the 1910 United States Census.

== Demographics ==
Historical population
| Census | Pop. | Note | %± |
|---|---|---|---|
| 1900 | 246 | | — |
| 1910 | 152 | | −38.2% |
| 1980 | 43 | | — |
| 1990 | 249 | | 479.1% |
| 2000 | 282 | | 13.3% |
| 2010 | 331 | | 17.4% |
| 2020 | 384 | | 16.0% |
U.S. Decennial Census

=== 2020 census ===
As of the 2020 census, Silo had a population of 384. The median age was 37.4 years. 28.1% of residents were under the age of 18 and 18.0% of residents were 65 years of age or older. For every 100 females there were 99.0 males, and for every 100 females age 18 and over there were 89.0 males age 18 and over.

0.0% of residents lived in urban areas, while 100.0% lived in rural areas.

There were 137 households in Silo, of which 42.3% had children under the age of 18 living in them. Of all households, 62.0% were married-couple households, 7.3% were households with a male householder and no spouse or partner present, and 24.8% were households with a female householder and no spouse or partner present. About 12.4% of all households were made up of individuals and 3.0% had someone living alone who was 65 years of age or older.

There were 140 housing units, of which 2.1% were vacant. The homeowner vacancy rate was 0.0% and the rental vacancy rate was 0.0%.

Racial composition as of the 2020 census
| Race | Number | Percent |
|---|---|---|
| White | 269 | 70.1% |
| Black or African American | 0 | 0.0% |
| American Indian and Alaska Native | 66 | 17.2% |
| Asian | 0 | 0.0% |
| Native Hawaiian and Other Pacific Islander | 0 | 0.0% |
| Some other race | 1 | 0.3% |
| Two or more races | 48 | 12.5% |
| Hispanic or Latino (of any race) | 18 | 4.7% |

=== 2000 census ===
As of the census of 2000, there were 282 people, 103 households, and 81 families residing in the town. The population density was 542.1 inhabitants per square mile (209.3/km^{2}). There were 114 housing units at an average density of 219.1 per square mile (84.6/km^{2}). The racial makeup of the town was 80.14% White, 14.18% Native American, 1.77% from other races, and 3.90% from two or more races. Hispanic or Latino of any race were 1.77% of the population.

There were 103 households, out of which 36.9% had children under the age of 18 living with them, 69.9% were married couples living together, 6.8% had a female householder with no husband present, and 20.4% were non-families. 18.4% of all households were made up of individuals, and 6.8% had someone living alone who was 65 years of age or older. The average household size was 2.74 and the average family size was 3.07.

In the town, the population was spread out, with 26.6% under the age of 18, 9.6% from 18 to 24, 26.2% from 25 to 44, 27.3% from 45 to 64, and 10.3% who were 65 years of age or older. The median age was 38 years. For every 100 females, there were 81.9 males. For every 100 females age 18 and over, there were 86.5 males.

The median income for a household in the town was $39,375, and the median income for a family was $42,159. Males had a median income of $31,500 versus $26,818 for females. The per capita income for the town was $15,681. About 1.4% of families and 2.3% of the population were below the poverty line, including 1.4% of those under the age of eighteen and 16.1% of those 65 or over.

== Education ==
Silo is served by Silo High School.
