= Redneck Shit =

Studio album by Wheeler Walker, Jr.
- Released: February 12, 2016
- Studios: Low Country Sound (Nashville, Tennessee)
- Genres: Country; comedy
- Length: 32:21
- Label: Pepper Hill
- Producer: Dave Cobb

Wheeler Walker, Jr. chronology
Redneck Shit (2016)	Ol' Wheeler (2017)

Redneck Shit is the debut album by American country music artist Wheeler Walker, Jr., released in 2016. The satirical comedy album debuted at No. 9 on the Billboard Top Country Albums chart and No. 1 on the Comedy Albums chart. Originally, the single "Drop 'em Out" debuted on PornHub.

== Track listing ==
No.	Title	Length
1.	"Redneck Shit"	2:24
2.	"Beer, Weed, Cooches"	2:35
3.	"Family Tree"	3:19
4.	"Can't Fuck You Off My Mind"	3:10
5.	"Fuck You Bitch"	3:22
6.	"Drop 'Em Out"	1:34
7.	"Eatin' Pussy/Kickin' Ass"	3:11
8.	"Fightin', Fuckin', Fartin'"	2:04
9.	"Better Off Beatin' Off"	2:49
10.	"Sit on My Face"	4:17
11.	"Which One o' You Queers Gonna Suck My Dick?"	3:36
Total length:		32:21

== Charts ==
Chart (2016)	Peak position
US Billboard 200	127
US Top Country Albums (Billboard)	2
US Top Comedy Albums (Billboard)	1
