= Ol' Wheeler =

Studio album by Wheeler Walker, Jr.
- Released: June 2, 2017
- Studios: Low Country Sound (Nashville, Tennessee)
- Genres: Country; comedy
- Length: 33:07
- Label: Pepper Hill
- Producer: Dave Cobb

Wheeler Walker, Jr. chronology
Redneck Shit (2016)	Ol' Wheeler (2017)	WW III (2018)

Ol' Wheeler is the second album by American country artist Wheeler Walker, Jr. Released on June 2, 2017, the album debuted at number 10 on the Billboard Top Country Albums chart, with 7,800 copies sold in its first week. Prior to the album's release, crowd funding music site PledgeMusic removed the album's pre-sales and refunded fans due to obscenity complaints. Upset, Wheeler Walker, Jr. claimed censorship and angry fans responded by trolling a page promoting the band 311.

== Track listing ==
No.	Title	Length
1.	"Pussy King"	3:37
2.	"Fuckin' Around"	3:39
3.	"Puss in Boots"	2:41
4.	"Finger Up My Butt"	1:26
5.	"Summers in Kentucky"	2:58
6.	"Drunk Sluts"	4:28
7.	"Ain't Got Enough Dick to Go Around"	3:05
8.	"If My Dick Is Up, Why Am I Down?"	3:14
9.	"Small Town Saturday Night"	2:25
10.	"Pictures on My Phone"	2:58
11.	"Poon"	2:36
Total length:		33:07

== Charts ==
Chart (2016)	Peak position
US Top Country Albums (Billboard)	10
