= Love & Light (Maddie & Tae album) =

Studio album by Maddie & Tae
- Released: May 2, 2025
- Genre: Country
- Length: 48:43
- Label: Mercury Nashville
- Producers: Corey Crowder; Josh Kerr; Chris LaCorte

Maddie & Tae chronology
What a Woman Can Do (2024)	Love & Light (2025)

Love & Light is the third and final studio album by American country music duo Maddie & Tae. It was released on May 2, 2025, via Mercury Nashville.

== Background ==
Maddie & Tae announced the album on their social media accounts on February 21, 2025. It was preceded by the release of an EP, What a Woman Can Do (2024), and several promotional singles. It also includes "Heart They Didn't Break", which was released as a single to country radio in September 2023.

They promoted the album with a short five-show Love & Light Tour in the spring of 2025.

== Content ==
Both members of Maddie & Tae, Maddie Font and Taylor Kerr, contributed heavily to the tracklisting, with Font co-writing 15 of the album's 16 tracks (the lone exception being "Heart They Didn't Break"). Kerr's husband, Josh Kerr, produced the majority of the tracks, with Corey Crowder and Chris LaCorte also working on select tracks for the record.

The album is described as telling "stories of resilience, confidence, vulnerability and the bond of friendship and sisterhood" and takes inspiration from both members of the duo starting families and navigating the "ups and downs of their careers". Font and Kerr have three children between them, all born since their previous full-length record was released, so they served as a big draw of inspiration for several tracks on the album, notably "Chasing Babies & Raising Dreams". Font described the creative process for Love & Light as a more mature approach for the veteran artists: "We're confidently past a chapter of our careers where we were blessed with the help of so many people trying to help lead us. We're no longer over-thinkers, people pleasers and servants of country's industry (focus on) country radio success."

== Track listing ==
Love & Light track listing
No.	Title	Writer(s)	Length
1.	"Fall in Love & Find Out"	Maddie Font; Taylor Kerr; Brad Tursi	3:21
2.	"Any Kinda Lovin'"	Font; T. Kerr; Daniel Ross; Laura Veltz	2:24
3.	"One Hit Wonders"	Font; Ryan Beaver; Jamie Moore	2:57
4.	"Heart They Didn't Break"	Beaver; Benjy Davis; Anna Vaus	3:11
5.	"Only Jesus"	Font; T. Kerr; Matt Dragstrem; Josh Miller	2:50
6.	"Free Like"	Font; Casey Brown; Deric Ruttan; Parker Welling	2:50
7.	"Down That Road"	Font; T. Kerr; Corey Crowder; Chris LaCorte	2:23
8.	"Kissing Cowboys"	Font; T. Kerr; Luke Dick; Veltz	3:02
9.	"Somebody Will"	Font; T. Kerr; Brent Anderson; Jason Massey	3:32
10.	"Girl in Alabama"	Font; T. Kerr; Josh Kerr; Summer Overstreet	3:11
11.	"Ain't Enough"	Font; T. Kerr; Crowder; Josh Thompson	3:13
12.	"What a Woman Can Do"	Font; T. Kerr; Barry Dean; Luke Laird	3:07
13.	"Drunk Girls in Bathrooms"	Font; T. Kerr; Beaver; Moore	3:26
14.	"Chasing Babies & Raising Dreams"	Font; T. Kerr; J. Kerr; Vaus	3:47
15.	"Sad Girl Summer"	Font; T. Kerr; J. Kerr; Matt McGinn	2:59
16.	"Love & Light"	Font; T. Kerr; J. Kerr; Devin Dawson	2:23
Total length:			48:43

== Personnel ==
Credits adapted from Tidal.

=== Maddie & Tae ===
- Maddie Font – vocals, background vocals
- Taylor Kerr – vocals, background vocals

=== Additional musicians ===
- Alex Wright – synthesizer (all tracks), Hammond B3 (tracks 1–3, 5–11, 13–16), piano (2–4)
- Evan Hutchings – drums, percussion (1–6, 8–15)
- Todd Lombardo – acoustic guitar (1–4, 9, 10, 13–15), mandolin (1, 2), banjo (2, 15)
- Tony Lucido – bass (1–4, 9, 13, 14)
- Josh Kerr – programming (1, 5–14, 16), background vocals (6, 12, 14), electric guitar (7, 10, 16); acoustic guitar, keyboards, synthesizer (10)
- Kris Donegan – electric guitar (1, 5, 6, 9, 10, 12, 14)
- Jeff Braun – programming (1, 5, 7–11, 13, 14, 16)
- Sol Philcox-Littlefield – electric guitar (2–4, 15)
- Corey Crowder – programming (2–4, 15)
- Justin Schipper – steel guitar (2, 3, 15)
- Jamie Moore – synthesizer (3)
- Bryan Sutton – acoustic guitar (5, 6, 12), Dobro guitar (6), mandolin (12)
- Jimmie Lee Sloas – bass (5, 6, 10, 12)
- Nathan Keeterle – electric guitar (5, 6, 10, 12)
- Chris LaCorte – acoustic guitar, electric guitar, keyboard, programming (7)
- Aaron Sterling – drums, percussion (7)
- Danny Rader – acoustic guitar (8, 11), bouzouki (8), guitar (11)
- Mark Hill – bass (8, 11)
- Forrest Font – background vocals (8)
- Leighton Kerr – background vocals (8)

=== Technical ===
- Josh Kerr – production (tracks 1, 5–14, 16), engineering (7, 16), digital editing (1, 5–11, 13, 14, 16), additional engineering (1, 5, 6, 8–10, 12–14, 16); recording, engineering assistance (11)
- Corey Crowder – production (2–4, 15), digital editing (2, 4), additional engineering (4)
- Chris LaCorte – production, additional engineering (7)
- Adam Ayan – mastering
- Jeff Braun – mixing (1, 5–14, 16), immersive mix engineering (12)
- Jeff Juliano – mixing (2–4, 15), immersive mix engineering (2, 3)
- Drew Bollman – engineering (1, 5, 6, 8–10, 12–14)
- Buckley Miller – engineering (2–4, 11, 15), digital editing (2, 4, 15)
- Austin Brown – recording, engineering assistance (1, 5, 6, 9, 10, 12–14)
- Zach Kuhlman – recording, engineering assistance (1, 2, 5, 6, 9, 10, 12–14)
- Louis Remenapp – recording, engineering assistance (3, 15)
- Maddie Harmon – recording, engineering assistance (8, 11)
- Joseph Chudyk – immersive mix engineering (12)
- Nick Zinnanti – digital editing (1, 5–13, 16)
- Aaron Sterling – additional engineering (7, 16)
- Alex Wright – additional engineering (7)
- David Cook – mixing assistance (4)
- Josh Flores – mixing assistance (4)
- Eric Arjes – mixing assistance (6, 12)
- Alyson McAnally – production coordination
