= Mason Dye =

American actor (born 1994)

- Born: Mason Andrew Dye; July 15, 1994 (age 31); Shawnee, Oklahoma, U.S.
- Occupation: Actor
- Years active: 2013–present
- Spouse: Carmen Joiner (m. 2026)
- Relatives: Tae Kerr (sister)

Mason Andrew Dye (born July 15, 1994) is an American actor. He is best known for his breakout role of Jason Carver in Stranger Things, and Bombsight in The Boys universe.

== Early life ==
Mason Dye was born in Shawnee, Oklahoma. He grew up in Ada, Oklahoma with older brother Preston and younger sister Taylor, the latter of whom is known for being one half of the country duo Maddie & Tae.

== Career ==
Dye started his career with supporting roles in movie Adventures of Bailey: A Night in Cowtown and recurring role on web series Secret Diary of an American Cheerleader 2: The Fierce One. In 2014, he starred as Christopher Dollanganger in the Lifetime movie Flowers in the Attic based on the novel by V. C. Andrews. He also guest starred in the TV shows Review and Teen Wolf. In 2015, he played the role of Victor in the Lifetime movie My Stepdaughter. Dye guest starred in Major Crimes and recurred in shows Roommates and Finding Carter.

In 2016, Dye starred as Tyler Evans in the drama film Natural Selection co-starring Katherine McNamara. Later that year, he starred as Josh Jackson in the action-adventure drama film Vanished – Left Behind: Next Generation alongside Amber Frank and Dylan Sprayberry. In 2017, Dye played the role of Bruce Kane in the Lifetime thriller film Stalker's Prey. He also starred as Tyler Pemhardt in the horror film Truth or Dare, which premiered on syfy channel. In 2018, he starred as Matt in the Lifetime movie The Wrong Son.

In 2022, Dye portrayed one of the main antagonists in the fourth season of the Netflix original series Stranger Things. He joined the show at the peak of its popularity and his role of a charismatic and confrontational jock, Jason Carver, brought him attention. In 2026, Dye appeared as the supe Bombsight in the fifth and final season of the Prime series The Boys. He is set to return as Bombsight in its prequel Vought Rising, set to premiere in 2027.

== Personal life ==
In February 2025, Dye became engaged to corporate executive Carmen Joiner after almost four years of dating. They married in 2026.

== Filmography ==
=== Film ===
Year	Title	Role	Notes
2013	Adventures of Bailey: A Night in Cowtown	Marc	
2016	Natural Selection	Tyler Evans	
2016	Vanished – Left Behind: Next Generation	Josh Jackson	

=== Television ===
Year	Title	Role	Notes
2014	Flowers in the Attic	Christopher Dollanganger	Television film
2014	Review	Tyler	Episode: "Revenge; Getting Rich; Aching"
2014	Teen Wolf	Garrett	4 episodes
2015	Finding Carter	Damon	9 episodes
2015	My Stepdaughter	Victor	Television film
2016	Major Crimes	Eric Hayes	Episode: "Family Law"
2017	Stalker's Prey	Bruce Kane	Television film
2017	Truth or Dare	Tyler Pemhardt	Television film
2018	The Wrong Son	Matt	Television film
2019	Bosch	Tom	Recurring role (season 5)
2019	The Goldbergs	Rick Kentwood	Episode: "Animal House"
2022	Stranger Things	Jason Carver	Recurring role (season 4)
2026	The Boys	Bombsight	Guest role
2027	Vought Rising †	Bombsight	Series regular

=== Web ===
Year	Title	Role	Notes
2013	Secret Diary of an American Cheerleader 2: The Fierce One	Brandon	5 episodes
2016	Roommates	Mason	8 episodes

=== Music videos ===
Year	Title	Artist
2015	"Shut Up and Fish"	Maddie & Tae
