= Sierra (song) =

Single by Maddie & Tae

from the album Start Here
- Released: May 16, 2016
- Recorded: 2014
- Studio: Blackbird (Nashville, Tennessee)
- Genre: Country; neotraditional country
- Length: 2:46
- Label: Republic; Dot
- Songwriter(s): Taylor Dye; Maddie Marlow; Aaron Scherz
- Producer(s): Dann Huff

Maddie & Tae singles chronology
"Shut Up and Fish" (2015)	"Sierra" (2016)	"Friends Don't" (2018)

"Sierra" is a song recorded by American country music duo Maddie & Tae. It was released to radio on May 16, 2016, as the fourth and final single off of their debut studio album, Start Here. The duo wrote the song with Aaron Scherz, and Dann Huff produced it.

== Content ==
The song describes and pokes fun at a bully girl named Sierra. The song takes inspiration a real life experience happened to Marlow: "I went home crying at least once a week because she was just so mean".

== Critical reception ==
Taste of Country reviewed the song favorably, saying that the girls "stay true to the instantly contagious hooks and riffs that make Start Here such an enjoyable listen out of the box".

== Charts ==
Chart (2016)	Peak position
US Country Airplay (Billboard)	47
