= Start Here =

Studio album by Maddie & Tae
- Released: August 28, 2015
- Recorded: 2014–15
- Studios: Blackbird (Nashville, Tennessee); Love Shack (Nashville, Tennessee); Room With A View (Nashville, Tennessee); Sound Stage (Nashville, Tennessee); Starstruck (Nashville, Tennessee)
- Genre: Country
- Length: 37:04
- Labels: Dot; Republic Nashville
- Producers: Dann Huff (all tracks); Aaron Scherz (track 2)

Maddie & Tae chronology
Maddie & Tae (2014)	Start Here (2015)	One Heart to Another (2019)

Singles from Start Here
- 1. "Girl in a Country Song" Released: July 15, 2014; 2. "Fly" Released: January 26, 2015; 3. "Shut Up and Fish" Released: November 2, 2015; 4. "Sierra" Released: May 16, 2016

Start Here is the debut studio album by American country music duo Maddie & Tae. It was released on August 28, 2015 via Dot Records and Republic Nashville. The album, produced by Dann Huff and Aaron Scherz, features eleven tracks. Its release was delayed so the duo could have more time to work on it.

== Background ==
The album was originally scheduled to be released on June 2, 2015, but Maddie & Tae pushed back the album’s release date to August 28. Marlow said "what we had was good, but we knew it could be so much better", while Dye added "we wanted to get the feel — the sound of it — and the music right. You only make your first album once".

== Content ==
Maddie & Tae stated: "we told our stories in this first album and that’s exactly what we plan to do for the albums to come, we want our fans to come along on this journey with us."

== Album artwork ==
The official album cover was shot by photographer Allister Ann: "The thing about us that really defines Maddie and I is we’re not those girls who want to spend a lot of time getting our hair done," Dye said. "We’d rather be out on a four-wheeler, playing guitar or just hanging out, having fun. That’s what the songs are made of. We thought the pictures should look like that, too".

== Singles ==
Four singles have been released from the album, the chart-topper "Girl in a Country Song", "Fly", "Shut Up and Fish" and "Sierra".

== Critical reception ==
Professional ratings
Aggregate scores
Source	Rating
Metacritic	80/100
Review scores
Source	Rating
AllMusic	4.5/5 stars
Billboard	4/5 stars
Digital Journal	4.5/5 stars
Exclaim!	8/10
Newsday	B+
PopMatters	7/10 stars
Rolling Stone	3.5/5 stars
Spin	7/10

Start Here received general acclaim from music critics, scoring an 80 out of 100 on the review aggregate website Metacritic, based on 6 critics, indicating "generally favorable reviews". Stephen Thomas Erlewine at AllMusic bestowed a four and a half stars out of five rating upon the album writing: " In another's hands, such scheming could seem crass or nasty but placed in the context of Start Here, where it's surrounded by both sweetness and swagger, it simply adds another dimension to an album that embodies all the complex contradictions and unfettered optimism of modern country-pop in 2015." Rolling Stone's Jon Dolan conferring a three and a half star rating out of five on the album saying: "Even when the sentiments are more traditional, though, Maddie & Tae sound tough-minded and stout-hearted."

Bequeathing a four star rating out of five upon the album at Billboard, Jewly Hight describing: "Just as the Chicks burnished a blend of modern bluegrass, singer-songwriter-style narration and adult contemporary pop sophistication a generation ago, Maddie & Tae are hyper-focused on shaping their own chipper, closer-harmonizing, string band-based aesthetic, though vocally, they're not yet the evocative storytellers they could be. And much as the Chicks have been known to embody a bold brand of femininity, the younger act strikes a posture of winsome self-assurance across these 11 tracks." Spin's Jonathan Bernstein granted the album a seven out of ten stating: "Start Here does a great job of cataloging the highs and lows of early milestones: first kisses, first breakups, leaving home for the first time."

Presenting a seven out of ten stars rating for PopMatters, Dave Heaton commenting: "There's a foundation here for greatness: on Start Here they seem to be aiming less for a towering achievement than for that sort of solid foundation upon which to build a career. The album is essentially packed-full of pleasantly put-together hooks, enjoyable melodic settings and observant if easy-to-slip-past-you lyrics." Judging the album an eight out of ten release, Stuart Henderson of Exclaim! suggesting: "Unlike those of many of their contemporaries, this album isn't offering much faux hard-won wisdom, and there's no late-night barstool proselytizing to speak of. Instead, Start Here channels the naïve wonder, genuine openness, and hopeful abandon of post-adolescence."

Glenn Gamboa assessing the album a B+ at Newsday calling: "The duo's debut "Start Here" (Big Machine) does not have anything to match their smart and savvy single that lampoons the objectification of women in country hits while using the same trappings of a bro-country hit." Digital Journal's Markos Papadatos rewarding the album with a four and a half out of five stars commenting: "Overall, Maddie & Tae deliver on their newest studio album Start Here. Many of the songs on this release are compelling and relatable. It is great to hear female artists again on the country radio airwaves."

== Commercial performance ==
Start Here debuted at No. 7 on the Billboard 200, and No. 2 on the Top Country Albums chart, with 24,000 copies sold in its debut week. The album has sold 103,800 copies in the US as of July 2016.

== Track listing ==
All tracks are written by Taylor Dye and Madison Marlow, with additional co-writers as noted.

No.	Title	Writer(s)	Length
1.	"Waitin' on a Plane"	Danny Myrick	3:25
2.	"Girl in a Country Song"	Aaron Scherz	3:38
3.	"Smoke"	Scherz; Brad Tursi	3:03
4.	"Shut Up and Fish"	Scherz; Pete Sallis	3:19
5.	"Fly"	Tiffany Vartanyan	3:38
6.	"Sierra"	Scherz	2:46
7.	"Your Side of Town"	Blair Daly; Heather Morgan	3:03
8.	"Right Here, Right Now"	Matt McGinn	3:39
9.	"No Place Like You"	Jon Nite; Jimmy Robbins	3:19
10.	"After the Storm Blows Through"	Scherz; Trent Willmon	3:43
11.	"Downside of Growing Up"	Brent Anderson; Frank Rogers	3:30
Total length:			37:04

Target Exclusive Deluxe Edition (bonus tracks)
No.	Title	Writer(s)	Length
12.	"After the Storm Blows Through" (acoustic version)	Scherz; Willmon	3:50
13.	"Downside of Growing Up" (acoustic version)	Anderson; Rogers	3:22
Total length:			44:16

== Personnel ==
Maddie and Tae

- Maddie Marlow – lead vocals
- Taylor Dye – background vocals

Additional Musicians

- Jason Bonilla – programming
- Joeie Canaday – bass guitar
- Dorian Crozier – drums
- Eric Darken – percussion
- Dan Dugmore – steel guitar, lap steel guitar
- Stuart Duncan – fiddle
- Shannon Forrest – drums
- Paul Franklin – steel guitar, steel guitar solo on "Waitin' on a Plane"
- Dann Huff – banjo, dobro, acoustic guitar, electric guitar
- David Huff – percussion, programming
- Charlie Judge – keyboards
- Jerry McPherson – electric guitar
- Mike Rojas – keyboards
- Aaron Scherz – acoustic guitar, electric guitar
- Jimmie Lee Sloas – bass guitar
- Ilya Toshinsky – banjo, acoustic guitar, mandolin
- Derek Wells – electric guitar
- Jonathan Yudkin – fiddle

== Charts ==
=== Weekly charts ===
Chart (2015)	Peak position
Australian Albums (ARIA)	49
Canadian Albums (Billboard)	12
UK Country Albums (Official Charts)	3
US Billboard 200	7
US Top Country Albums (Billboard)	2

=== Year-end charts ===
Chart (2015)	Position
US Top Country Albums (Billboard)	51
Chart (2016)	Position
US Top Country Albums (Billboard)	53
