= Fly (Maddie & Tae song) =

2015 single by Maddie & Tae

Single by Maddie & Tae

from the album Start Here
- Released: January 26, 2015
- Studio: Blackbird (Nashville, Tennessee)
- Genre: Country
- Length: 3:40
- Label: Republic; Dot
- Songwriters: Taylor Dye; Maddie Marlow; Tiffany Vartanyan
- Producer: Dann Huff

Maddie & Tae singles chronology
"Girl in a Country Song" (2014)	"Fly" (2015)	"Shut Up and Fish" (2015)

Music video
- "Fly" on YouTube

Alternate Single Art

"Fly" is a song recorded by American country music duo Maddie & Tae. It was released in January 2015 as the second single from their debut studio album, Start Here. The song, written by the duo and Tiffany Vartanyan, is an inspirational anthem about a girl wanting to find success. It garnered a positive reception from critics praising the production and the girls' vocal performances for elevating the overall theme of the song.

"Fly" peaked at number nine on both the Billboard Country Airplay and Hot Country Songs charts respectively. It also charted at number 61 on the Hot 100 chart. The song was certified Platinum by the Recording Industry Association of America (RIAA), and has sold over 1,000,000 copies in that country as of May 2025. It received similar chart success in Canada, peaking at number 18 on the Country chart and number 66 on the Canadian Hot 100 chart.

An accompanying music video for the song, directed by Brian Lazzaro, features the duo writing and performing the song while intercut with images of butterflies, babies playing and children climbing on ropes and ladders. A second video has the duo performing at the Monroe Carell Jr. Children's Hospital at Vanderbilt while also showing patients performing on stage and interacting with their doctors.

== Content ==
The song is an inspirational song primarily backed by acoustic instruments and by a prominent fiddle and it's in the key of F major. The song is in strong contrast with the duo's previous single "Girl in a Country Song": while the latter used irony and satire to criticize Nashville's emphasis on dated and exploitive female stereotypes, "Fly" delivers a sincere narrative account of a girl striving for success.

"'Fly' is not about when the going's easy and the path's smooth," Taylor Dye shared about the song. "It's when everything's going wrong... when you're sure it's not going to happen... and somehow still take that step. For Maddie and I, that always seems to be the moment when – literally – we fly".

== Reception ==
=== Critical ===
The song has received positive reviews from music critics: Taste of Country gave "Fly" a positive review, saying it is "a meaningful ballad that showcases their full, unique harmonies". Tammy Ragus of Country Weekly rated it A−, saying that "while [the subject matter] is hardly a new concept for country music, the arrangement is unique in that it is both urgent and tender. And the impeccable and seamless harmonies...give 'Fly' an innocent yet anthemic feel." Got Country Online rated the song four stars out of five, saying that "the lyrics are notably motivational and inspiring and may be exactly the message our younger generation of listeners need right now". Ben Foster of Country Universe gave the song a B+ grade, praising the girls' vocal delivery and the song's production. He also thought that "the hook "You can learn to fly on the way down" [...] is a beautiful encapsulation of the song's central point that one should not be deterred by fear of failure".

=== Commercial ===
"Fly" debuted at number 53 on the Country Airplay, and number 49 on the Hot Country Songs charts dated for the week ending February 7, 2015. It climbed the chart slowly and peaked at number 9 on the Country Airplay chart on September 12, 2015, and also number 9 on the Hot Country Songs two weeks later for chart dated September 26, 2015. It entered the Hot 100 at number 92 for chart dated August 1, 2015, and peaked at number 61 on October 3, 2015. The song has sold 321,000 copies in the US as of November 2015 and has since gone Platinum by the RIAA on October 28, 2022.

== Music video ==
The Brian Lazzaro-directed video premiered on February 21, 2015, on CMT. The video features the duo writing and performing the song while intercut with scenes of butterflies, babies playing and children climbing on ropes and ladders. On January 22, 2016, the duo released a second video of them performing the song at Nashville's Monroe Carell Jr. Children's Hospital at Vanderbilt. The video also features scenes of the patients performing on stage and interacting with their doctors.

== Live performance ==
On September 1, 2015, Maddie & Tae performed the song live, along with "Girl in a Country Song", on NBC's Today. They performed the song in the 90th Macy's Thanksgiving Day Parade on November 24, 2016.

== Chart performance ==
Chart (2015)	Peak position
Canada Hot 100 (Billboard)	66
Canada Country (Billboard)	18
US Billboard Hot 100	61
US Country Airplay (Billboard)	9
US Hot Country Songs (Billboard)	9

=== Year-end charts ===
Chart (2015)	Position
US Country Airplay (Billboard)	27
US Hot Country Songs (Billboard)	42

== Certifications ==
Region	Certification	Certified units/sales
United States (RIAA)	Platinum	1,000,000^{‡}
^{‡} Sales+streaming figures based on certification alone.

== Jules LeBlanc version ==
"Fly"

Single by Annie LeBlanc
- Published: August 11, 2017
- Genre: Country
- Length: 3:36
- Songwriters: Taylor Dye; Maddie Marlow; Tiffany Vartanyan
- Producer: David Kidd

Annie LeBlanc singles chronology
"Little Do You Know" (2017)	"Fly" (2017)	"Birds of a Feather" (2017)

In 2017, YouTube star and actress Jules LeBlanc covered "Fly" where it was posted to her YouTube channel. The official video was made private as of December 12, 2019.

=== Chart performance ===
Chart history
Chart (2017)	Peak position
US Hot Country Songs (Billboard)	34
