= Girl in a Country Song =

Single by Maddie & Tae

from the album Start Here
- Released: July 15, 2014
- Studio: Blackbird (Nashville, Tennessee)
- Genre: Country
- Length: 3:39
- Label: Republic; Dot
- Songwriters: Taylor Dye; Maddie Marlow; Aaron Scherz
- Producers: Dann Huff; Aaron Scherz

Maddie & Tae singles chronology
| "Girl in a Country Song" (2014) | "Fly" (2015) |

"Girl in a Country Song" is a song recorded by American country music duo Maddie & Tae, co-written with Aaron Scherz. It was released in July 2014 as the lead single from their debut studio album Start Here. The song criticizes the "bro-country" subgenre in contemporary country music, specifically in how women are portrayed by men, with lyrics containing references to a variety of popular recent country songs.

"Girl in a Country Song" peaked at number one on the Billboard Country Airplay chart, making Maddie & Tae the first female duo to top that chart with their debut single since The Wreckers' "Leave the Pieces" in 2006, and only the second in history. It also charted at numbers three and 54 on the Hot Country Songs and Hot 100 charts, respectively. The song was certified Platinum by the Recording Industry Association of America (RIAA), and has sold 667,000 units in the United States as of September 2015. It achieved similar chart success in Canada, peaking at number five on the Canada Country chart and number 61 on the Canadian Hot 100 chart.

The accompanying music video for the song was directed by TK McKamy.

== Content ==
The song is a response to the contemporary "bro-country" trend in country music, specifically pertaining to the way that top male stars portray women in their songs, and its lyrics contain references to a variety of popular recent country songs. Some specific songs include "Get Me Some of That" by Thomas Rhett, "Aw Naw" by Chris Young, "Redneck Crazy" by Tyler Farr, "My Kinda Party", "Dirt Road Anthem" and "Take a Little Ride" by Jason Aldean, "Boys 'Round Here" by Blake Shelton, and the stereotypical sugar shaker line, which was also included in the contemporary song "Get Your Shine On" by Florida Georgia Line.

The genesis of the song goes back to early 2014 when the three writers noted how marginalized women were in country music at the time. The song was written in 90 minutes.

== Critical reception ==
Kevin John Coyne of Country Universe rated the single an "A", saying that "Maddie & Tae have written and recorded the antidote to something that ails country music right now, and thankfully, they’re not offering it up with any sugar to help that medicine go down."

== Commercial performance ==
"Girl in a Country Song" debuted at number 58 on the Country Airplay chart dated for the week ending July 19, 2014. After 23 weeks on the charts, it reached number one for the chart dated December 20, 2014, giving Maddie & Tae their first number one hit. It became the first debut single by a female duo to reach number one since The Wreckers did it in 2006 with "Leave the Pieces," and only the second in history. It would remain Maddie & Tae's only number one single until almost six years later, when they topped the chart again with "Die from a Broken Heart" in August 2020. The song was certified Gold by the RIAA on November 17, 2014, and has sold 667,000 copies in the US as of September 2015.

== Music video ==
TK McKamy directed the song's music video. It won Video of the Year at the 2015 Country Music Association awards.

== Charts and certifications ==
=== Weekly chart ===
| Chart (2014–2015) | Peak position |
|---|---|
| Canada Hot 100 (Billboard) | 61 |
| Canada Country (Billboard) | 5 |
| US Billboard Hot 100 | 54 |
| US Country Airplay (Billboard) | 1 |
| US Hot Country Songs (Billboard) | 3 |

=== Year-end charts ===
| Chart (2014) | Position |
|---|---|
| US Country Airplay (Billboard) | 55 |
| US Hot Country Songs (Billboard) | 44 |

| Chart (2015) | Position |
|---|---|
| US Country Airplay (Billboard) | 80 |
| US Hot Country Songs (Billboard) | 77 |

=== Certifications ===
| Region | Certification | Certified units/sales |
|---|---|---|
| United States (RIAA) | Platinum | 667,000 |
