= Maddie & Tae =

American female country music duo

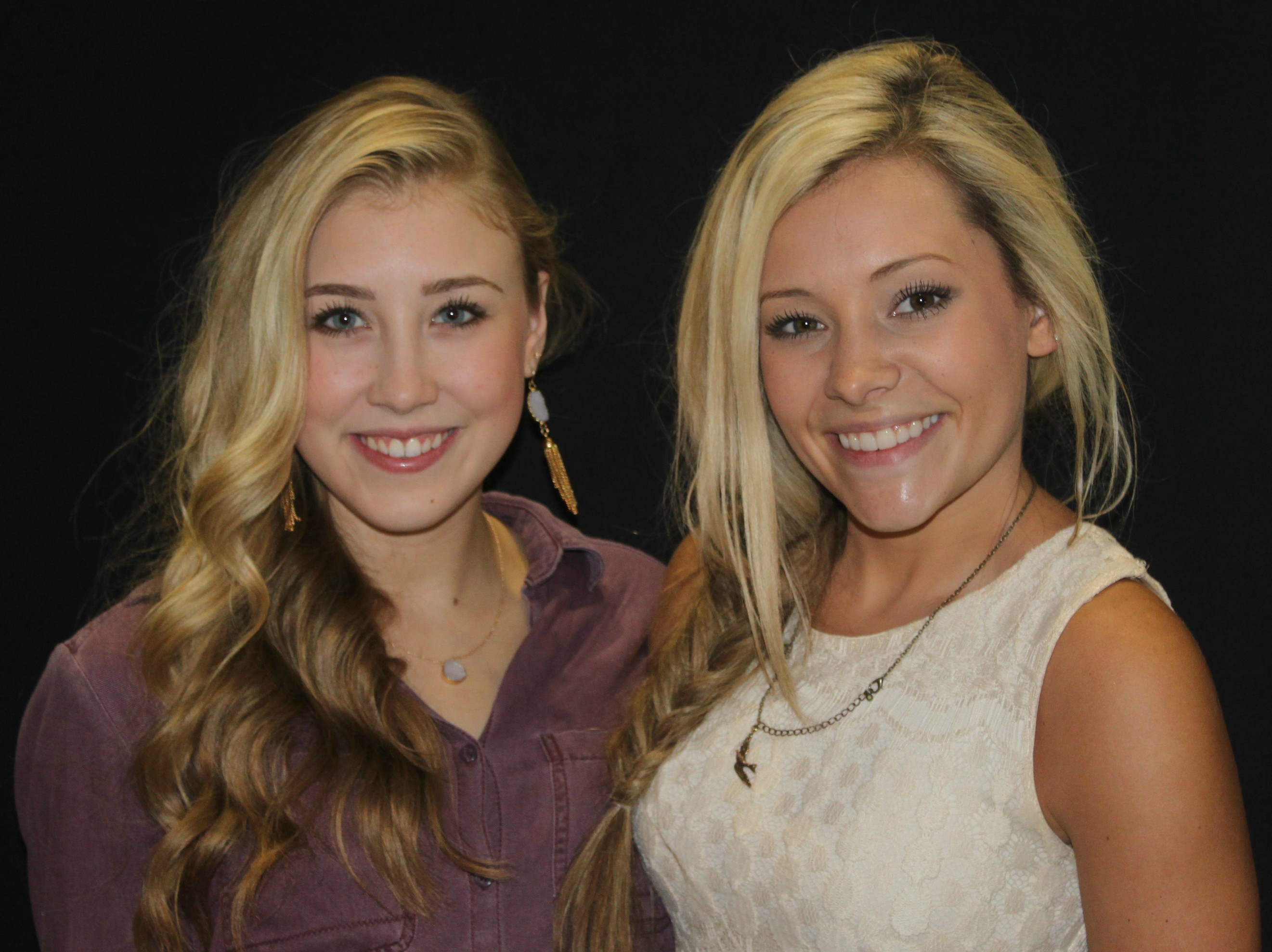
- Maddie Font (left) and Tae Kerr (right) in 2014

Background information
- Origin: Nashville, Tennessee, U.S.
- Genre: Country
- Years active: 2014–2026
- Label: Mercury Nashville
- Past members: Maddie Font; Tae Kerr

Maddie & Tae were an American female country music duo composed of Maddie Font (née Marlow) and Taylor "Tae" Kerr (née Dye), both of whom are singers, songwriters, and guitarists. The duo was signed to the revived Dot Records in 2014. Their debut album, Start Here, was released on August 28, 2015, and includes the singles "Girl in a Country Song", "Fly", "Shut Up and Fish", and "Sierra". Following the closure of Dot Records, they signed to Mercury Nashville in 2018. They released their second studio album The Way It Feels in April 2020, and the first part of their third studio album, Through The Madness in 2022. The duo split up following their final performance in April 2026.

== Career ==
=== 2010–2016: Early beginnings and Start Here ===
In 2010, Maddie Marlow and Tae Dye were both going to the same vocal coach and met at a showcase in Dallas. Within the year, the duo was going back and forth to Nashville every weekend while still going to school. They first performed under the name Sweet Aliana. After finishing high school, the duo moved to Nashville to begin their musical career as Maddie & Tae. In 2014, Big Machine Records revived the Dot Records name for a new imprint. Maddie & Tae were confirmed as the first signees of the label in June 2014.

They wrote their debut single, "Girl in a Country Song", with Aaron Scherz, who co-produced it with Dann Huff. The song is a criticism of the then-contemporary bro-country trend. "Girl in a Country Song" debuted at number 58 on the Country Airplay chart dated for the week ending July 19, 2014. After 23 weeks, it reached number 1 for the chart dated December 20, 2014, becoming the first debut single by a female duo to reach number one since The Wreckers did it in 2006 with "Leave the Pieces", and only the second in history. The duo made their debut at the Grand Ole Opry on September 23, 2014.

Maddie & Tae released their self-titled EP on November 4, 2014. It featured "Girl in a Country Song" as well as three new tracks: "Sierra", "Fly", and "Your Side of Town".

"Fly" was released on January 26, 2015. It made its television debut when they performed the song on The Tonight Show Starring Jimmy Fallon. Their debut album, Start Here, was released on August 28, 2015. By October 2015, the song had become a Top 10 hit on both Hot Country Songs and Country Airplay. The duo co-wrote the track "Boomerang" on Jana Kramer's late 2015 album Thirty One. The album's third single, "Shut Up and Fish" released to country radio on November 2, 2015. The album's fourth single, "Sierra", was released to country radio in 2016.

Maddie and Tae guest-starred on the Disney Channel show Girl Meets World in an episode entitled "Girl Meets Texas, Part 2", which premiered on October 17, 2015. They performed at The O2 Arena, on the main stage of the C2C: Country to Country festival in March 2016 – their first visit to the UK. They released a fashion line in collaboration with Bloomingdales in late 2016.

=== 2017–2022: The Way It Feels and Through the Madness ===
In early 2017, Maddie and Tae appeared on Forbes' 30 Under 30 - Music list at #20. They received two nominations for the 52nd annual Academy of Country Music Awards, including Vocal Duo of the Year. In June 2017, it was announced that Maddie and Tae had signed with UMG Nashville following the closing of Dot Records.

In early 2018, Maddie & Tae signed with Mercury Nashville and released the single "Friends Don't." It has since peaked at number 33 on the Billboard Country Airplay charts. The duo was an opening act on Carrie Underwood's Cry Pretty Tour 360 which began on May 1, 2019. In March 2019, the duo released another promotional single entitled "Tourist in This Town." Their EP One Heart to Another was released on April 26, 2019. In May 2019, the duo released the song, "Die from a Broken Heart", which sold 7,000 units in its first week. The song reached a peak of number 2 on the US Country Chart and number 1 on Country Airplay chart. This was the duo's first number one single ince their debut single.

Their second studio album, The Way It Feels, was released on April 10, 2020. A Christmas music EP, We Need Christmas, followed on October 23, 2020. In November 2021, Tae revealed that she and her husband were expecting their first child in the spring of 2022.

The first volume of the pair's third studio album, the EP Through the Madness, Vol. 1, was released on January 28, 2022. That same year, they embarked on their "All Song No Static Tour", with Abbey Cone and Sacha as supporting acts. On September 23, 2022, the duo released the second volume of Through the Madness.

=== 2024–2026: What a Woman Can Do, Love & Light and split announcement ===
On September 13, 2024, the pair released their EP What a Woman Can Do.

On May 2, 2025, the duo released their third album, Love & Light. On December 8, 2025, the duo announced that they will be splitting following their upcoming tour. Their final performance together took place on April 26, 2026.

== Members ==
=== Maddie Font ===
Madison Diana "Maddie" Font (née Marlow) (born July 7, 1995) was raised in Sugar Land, Texas. She graduated from George Ranch High School in 2013.

She is the duo's lead vocalist and also plays guitar, tambourine and mandolin.

On November 22, 2019, Maddie married Jonah Font after eight years of dating. On September 9, 2023, the couple welcomed their first child, a son.

Following the duo's disbandment in 2026, Font released her debut solo single "Drive Me Around" on September 4, 2026.

=== Tae Kerr ===
Taylor Elizabeth "Tae" Kerr (née Dye) (born September 18, 1995) was raised in Ada, Oklahoma. She has two older brothers, one of whom is actor Mason Dye. She graduated from Silo High School in 2013.

She is the duo's harmony vocalist and also plays left-handed guitar and piano. She also occasionally sings lead vocals.

On February 21, 2020, Tae married songwriter Josh Kerr after over a year of dating. On January 17, 2022, they welcomed their first child, a daughter, who was born three months early. In June 2024, the couple announced that they were expecting their second child, a boy. On October 29, 2024, their son was born.

== Discography ==
Studio albums

- Start Here (2015)
- The Way It Feels (2020)
- Love & Light (2025)

== Tours ==
Headlining

- Start Here Tour (2015)
- Tourist in This Town Tour (2020)
- All Song No Static Tour (2022)
- Here's to Friends Tour (2024)
- Love & Light Tour (2025)

Supporting

- Sounds of Summer Tour (2015) with Dierks Bentley, Kip Moore, & Canaan Smith
- Life Amplified World Tour (2016) with Brad Paisley and Tyler Farr
- Storyteller Tour: Stories in the Round (2016) with Carrie Underwood and Little Big Town and Sam Hunt
- Cry Pretty Tour 360 (2019) with Carrie Underwood and Runaway June

== Accolades ==
Awards received by Maddie & Tae
Award	Year	Recipient	Category	Result
Country Music Association Awards	2015	"Girl in a Country Song" Maddie & Tae	Music Video of the Year	Won
CMT Music Awards	2022	Maddie & Tae "Woman You Got"	Duo/Group Video of the Year	Won
